= State visit by Deng Xiaoping to the United States =

1979 visit by paramount leader of China

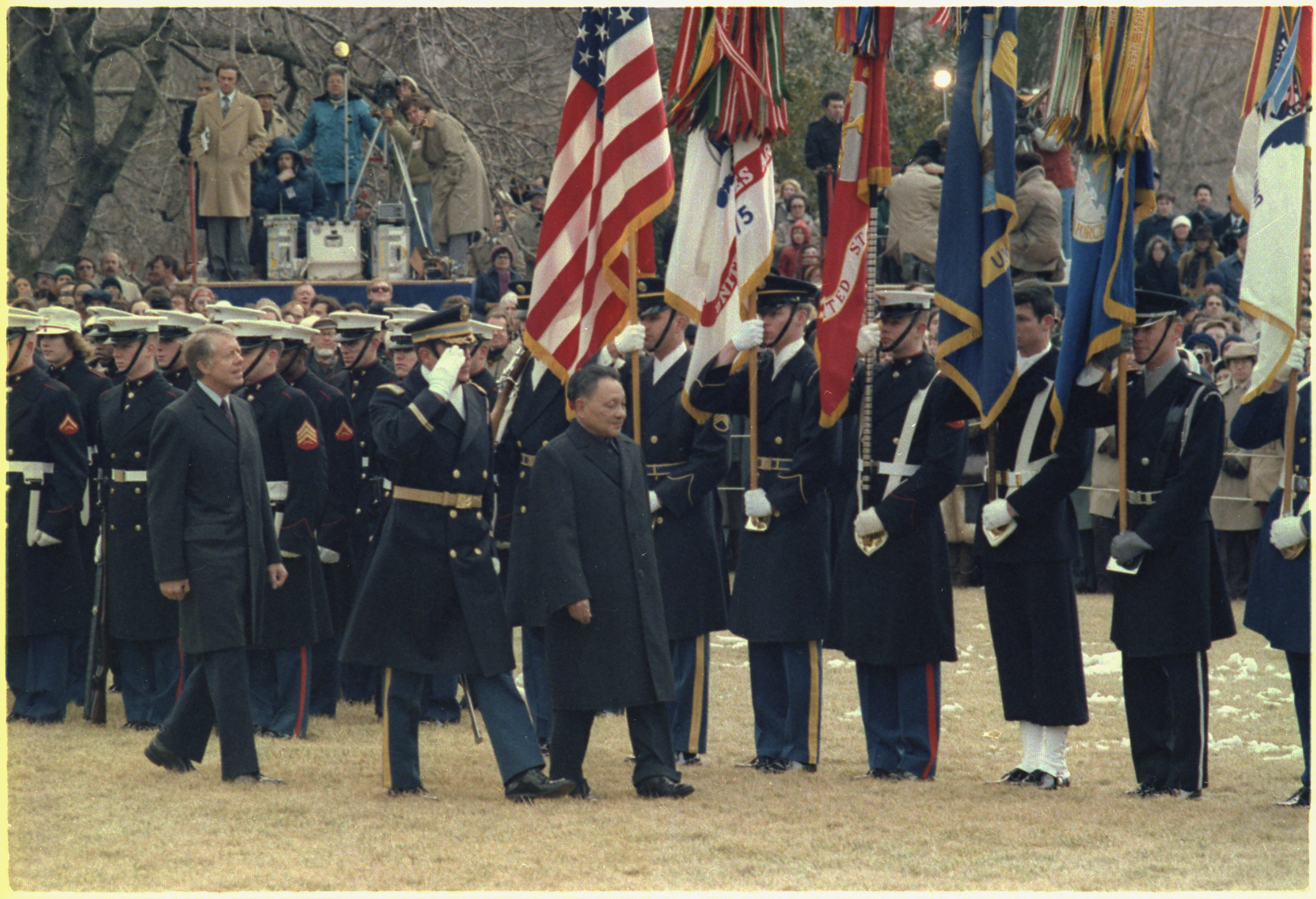
Deng and President Jimmy Carter inspected the joint-service honor guard during an arrival ceremony for Deng at the White House.

Deng Xiaoping paid the first official visit by a paramount leader of China to the United States from January to February 1979. Deng undertook the visit in his official capacities as Vice Chairman of the Chinese Communist Party, First Vice Premier of the State Council and Chairman of the Chinese People's Political Consultative Conference. The visit initiated a series of high-level exchanges that would continue until the spring of 1989. It was the most important Chinese diplomatic visit to the country since Soong Mei-ling, wife of the Republic of China's leader Chiang Kai-shek, in 1943.

== Meetings and ceremonies ==
=== Visit to Washington D.C. (29–31 January) ===
==== Welcoming ceremony and bilateral meetings ====
Deng arrived in the capital Washington, D.C., on 29 January with his wife Zhuo Lin. He was welcomed to the White House with full military honors from the 3rd U.S. Infantry Regiment (The Old Guard), Ceremonial Company A at Marine Barracks Washington, the United States Navy Ceremonial Guard, the United States Air Force Honor Guard, the United States Coast Guard Ceremonial Honor Guard as well as the United States Army Band. A 19-gun salute (since Deng was not the official head of state of China) was also fired in honor of Deng.

During a bilateral meeting with Carter, he criticized Soviet relations with Vietnam, saying the following to him and Secretary Cyrus Vance:

Vietnam is playing the role of Cuba. Of course, the Soviet Union will make use of Vietnam to harass China. Vietnam is also an important factor in the Soviet "Asian collective security system."

Deng sought an endorsement from the United States in order to deter the Soviet Union from intervening when China launched a contemplated punitive attack against Vietnam. He informed Carter that China could not accept Vietnam's "wild ambitions" and was prepared to teach it a lesson. Deng stated that the action would be limited in scope, and Chinese troops would quickly withdraw. According to United States National Security Advisor Zbigniew Brzezinski, Carter reserved judgment, an action which Chinese diplomats interpreted as tacit approval for China's invasion of Vietnam during the Sino-Vietnamese war, which China launched shortly after Deng's return from the United States visit. According to academic Suisheng Zhao, "The proximity in the timing of the military thrust to take advantage of the normalization to bluff the Soviets with a nonexistent US endorsement."

Deng also told Brzezinski that China was not afraid of a war with the Soviet Union because China had nuclear weapons.

When Carter attempted to raise the issue of human rights in China during their discussions, particularly in the context of China's One-child policy, Deng quipped that he could provide as many as two hundred million Chinese, if necessary, to the United States for the protection of human rights.

On 31 January, Carter and Deng signed agreements on cultural relations, science collaboration, and technology collaboration between their two countries. Other American officials and Chinese officials signed agreements addressing high-energy physics cooperation, consular services, and education cooperation.

==== State dinner ====
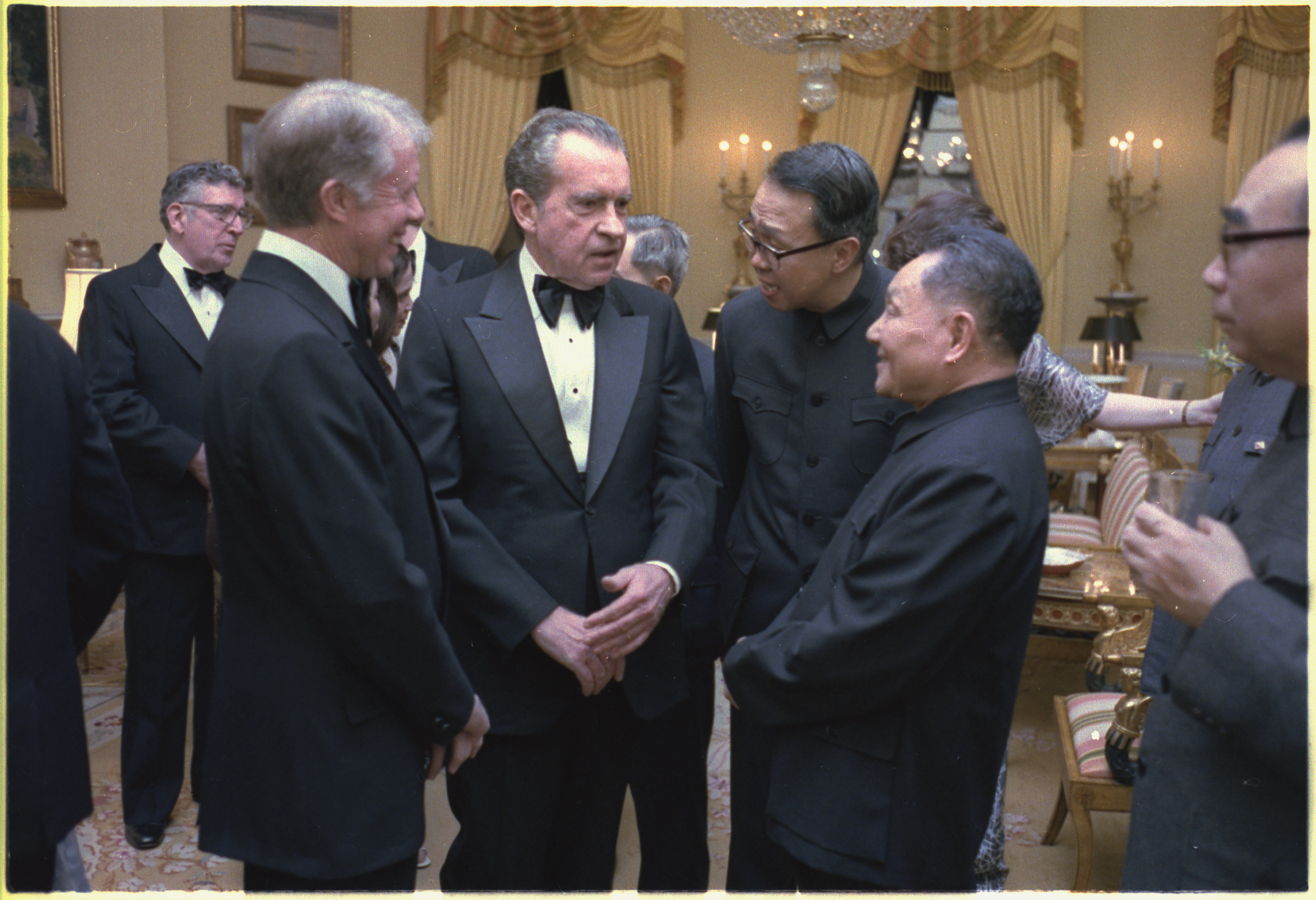
Former President Nixon speaking with Deng Xiaoping and Jimmy Carter at the White House.

The evening of 29 January, a state dinner was held in honor of Deng and his delegation at the White House. Among the guests was former President Richard Nixon, his first return to the White House since his resignation speech in August 1974. President Carter at first refused to invite Nixon, but Deng said that if the former president was not invited, he would visit him at his California residence. During the dinner, Nixon had a private meeting with Deng and Carter. A string section from the United States Air Force Band began to perform as dessert was being served. Following the dinner, Deng and Carter went to the John F. Kennedy Center for the Performing Arts to witness performances by groups such as the Joffrey Ballet as well as singers such as John Denver and Shirley MacLaine. On January 31, 1979, during his visit to the United States, Deng Xiaoping received an honorary Doctor of Laws degree from Temple University at Blair House in Washington, D.C.

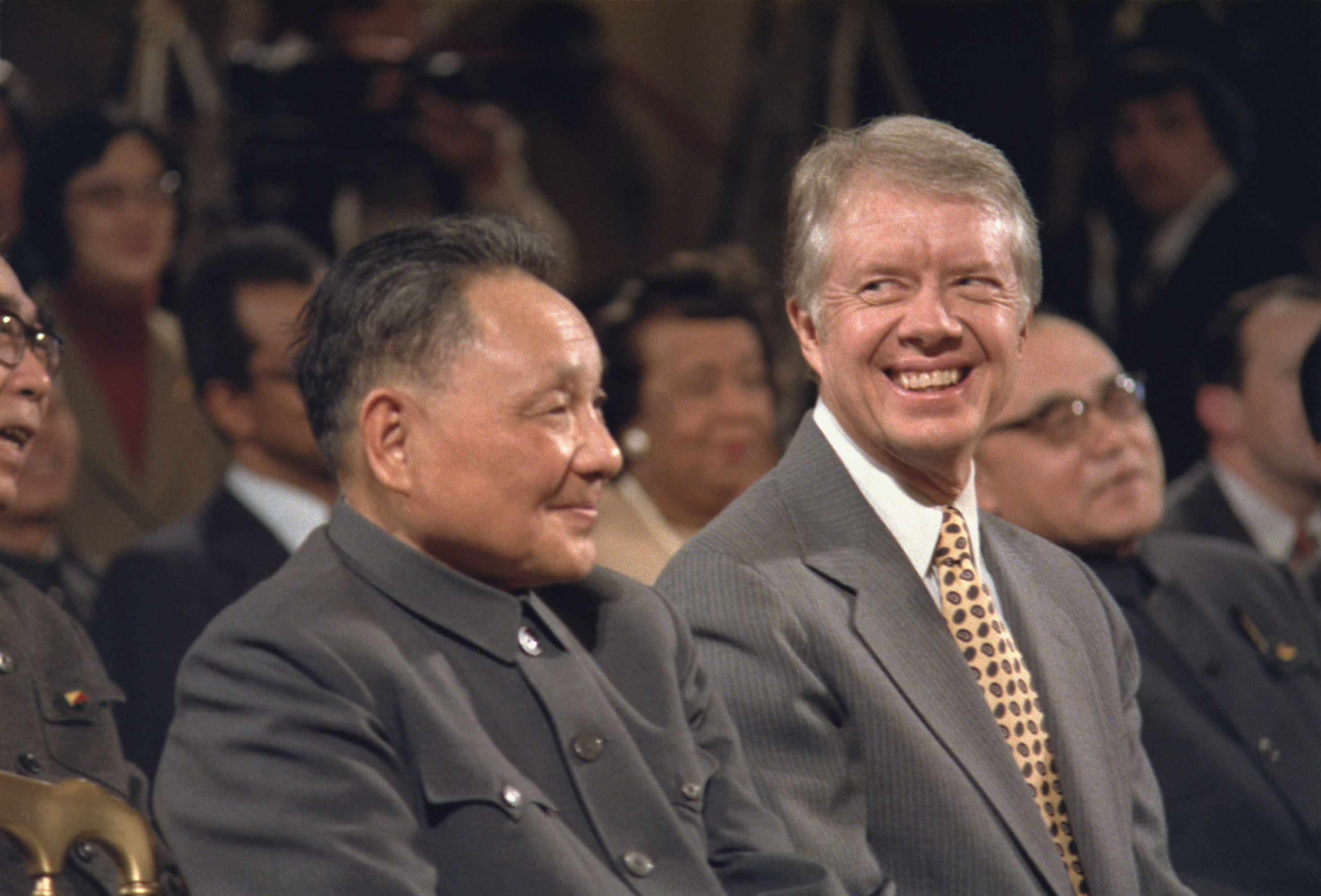
Jimmy Carter and Deng at the Signing Ceremony.

=== Visit to Georgia (1–2 February) ===
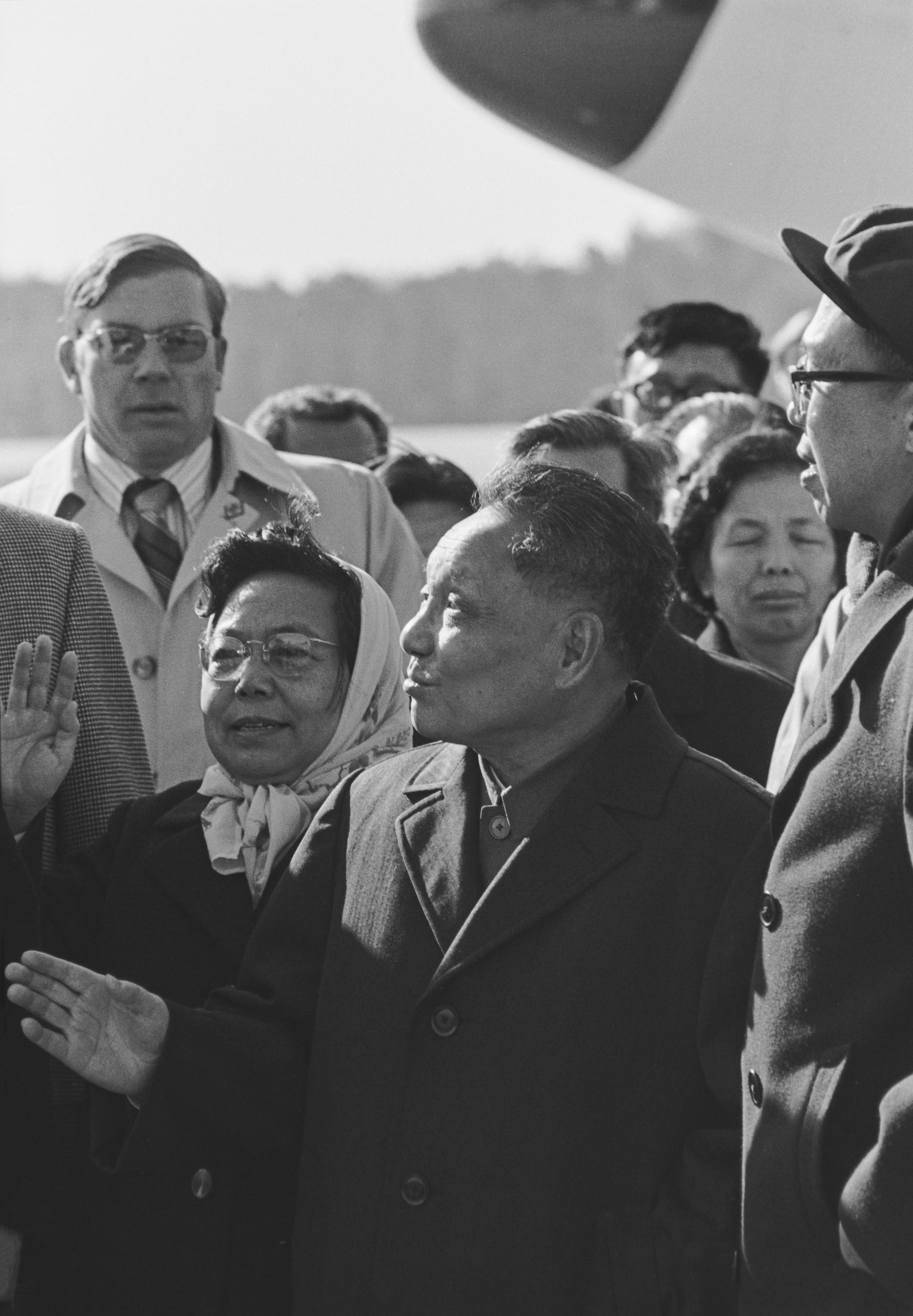
Deng and Zhuo Lin arriving at Dobbins Air Force Base, Georgia

On 1 February, he arrived in Atlanta, the capital of the state of Georgia, Carter's home state. In Atlanta he visited the headquarters of Coca-Cola and later toured the Atlanta Assembly owned by the Ford Motor Company in Hapeville. A banquet was held in honor of Deng the evening of 2 February. The Atlanta Chapter of the National Association of Chinese-Americans was inaugurated the following year as a result of his visit.

During the Atlanta portion of the trip, Deng and Coca-Cola signed a deal to allow the company entry into the Chinese market.

Deng laid a wreath at the grave of Martin Luther King Jr.

=== Visit to Texas (2–3 February) ===
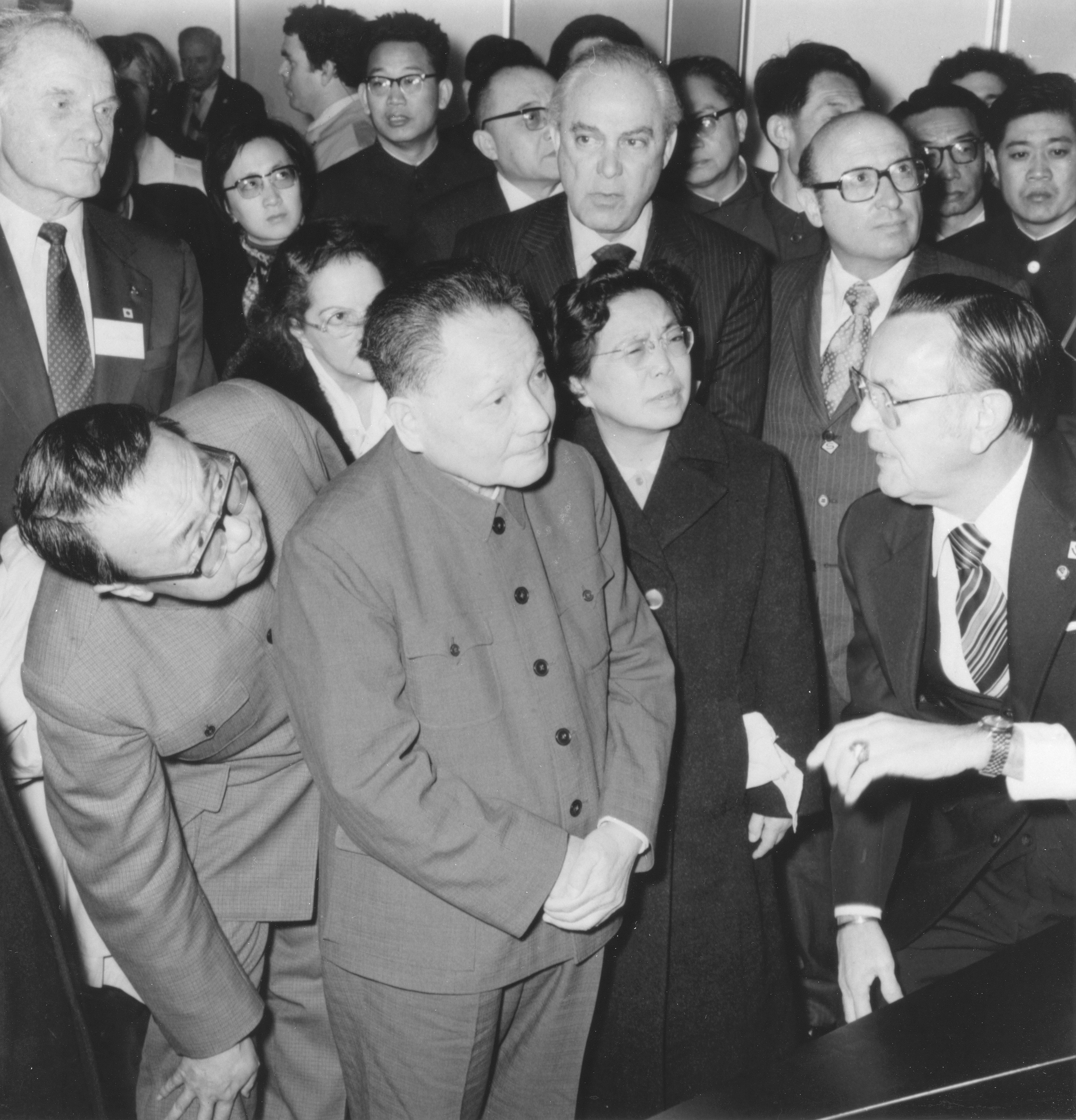
Deng Xiaoping (left) and his wife Zhuo Lin (right) are briefed by Johnson Space Center director Christopher C. Kraft (extreme right)

Deng arrived in at Houston Intercontinental Airport on the Morning of February 2. He arrived on Air Force One with local congressman Mickey Leland and was greeted by Mayor of Houston Jim McConn. At the arrival ceremony, McConn presented Deng with a box of silver spurs. The U.S. Senators from Texas, John Tower and Lloyd Bentsen, refused to be seen with Deng. Texas Governor Bill Clements was at the airport, declined to personally greet Deng, and immediately returned to the state capital. Clements stated, "[W]e will turn out in a normal show of Texas hospitality. Whether we agree with him politically, philosophically, or whether we like chop suey or not, is beside the point."

Deng visited the Hughes Tool Company, a leading manufacturer of oil drilling equipment. That afternoon, he toured Johnson Space Center and was photographed sitting in a replica of the Apollo 11 lunar rover.

That evening, he was presented a Stetson cowboy hat during a rodeo he attended in Simonton hosted by what is now the Greater Houston Partnership. The hat was given to him by a teenage barrel rider. When the barrel rider's sister fell from her horse later during the rodeo, Deng sent his personal physician to check on her and confirm that she was not injured. The Stetson hat is displayed in the National Museum of China in the center of the exhibit hall which focuses on Deng.

The Texas portion of Deng's trip was sponsored by the Houston Chamber of Commerce.

=== Visit to Washington state (3–5 February) ===
He arrived in the evening on 3 February at Boeing Field in Seattle before being transported to the Washington Plaza Hotel. He was accompanied by United States Secretary of Energy James R. Schlesinger, Governor Dixy Lee Ray and Senators Warren Magnuson and Henry M. Jackson. He also visited former Secretary of State Henry Kissinger and toured the Boeing Everett Factory.

China had lost access to Soviet-manufactured aircraft almost twenty years earlier as a result of the Sino-Soviet split. China sought to upgrade its aircraft. While in Seattle, Deng signed a deal to purchase several Boeing 747s.

== Reactions and aftermath ==
Carter stated that he found Deng, "small, tough, intelligent, frank, courageous, personable, self-assured, [and] friendly." Carter later described the visit as one of the most delightful experiences of his presidency.

The photograph of Deng donning the cowboy hat given to him at the rodeo in Simonton became a positive image for many Americans. Most of the American public's reaction toward the visit was hostile, with anti-Communists and nationalists staging protests. Four days prior to his visit, a group of anti-Deng protesters broke the entrance glass to what is now the Embassy of China in Washington, D.C. During the welcoming ceremony at the White House, two protesters were taken away from the press area after chanting anti-Chinese slogans. In Houston, there was an assassination attempt by a Ku Klux Klan member against Deng. The KKK member, who rushed to the podium where Deng was speaking with a knife, was intercepted by an agent of the United States Secret Service. American Maoist Bob Avakian, along with his group Revolutionary Communist Party, USA, protested Deng at the White House and denounced him as a "capitalist roader", and 17 party members, including Avakian, were later charged with multiple felonies including assaulting a police officer. Avakian and many RCP members fled abroad, and the charges were eventually dropped in 1982.

Shortly after Deng's visit, Texas Lieutenant Governor William P. Hobby Jr. traveled to China and signed a deal through which China began selling crude oil to Houston-area refineries.

On 1 March 1979, formal embassies were established in the capitals of the two countries. The consulate in Houston was the first PRC consulate opened in the United States. Vice President Walter Mondale reciprocated Deng's visit with a trip to mainland China in August 1979. Two weeks later, the SS Letitia Lykes entered Shanghai harbor in the first US-flagged ship to visit the PRC in 30 years. This visit led to agreements in September 1980 on maritime affairs, civil aviation links, and textile matters, as well as a bilateral consular convention.

== See also ==
- 1972 visit by Richard Nixon to China
- 2017 state visit by Donald Trump to China
- 2026 state visit by Donald Trump to China
- 2015 state visit by Xi Jinping to the United States
- 2026 state visit by Xi Jinping to the United States
- China–United States relations
- State visits to the United States
