= 1972 visit by Richard Nixon to China =

American diplomatic overture to the PRC

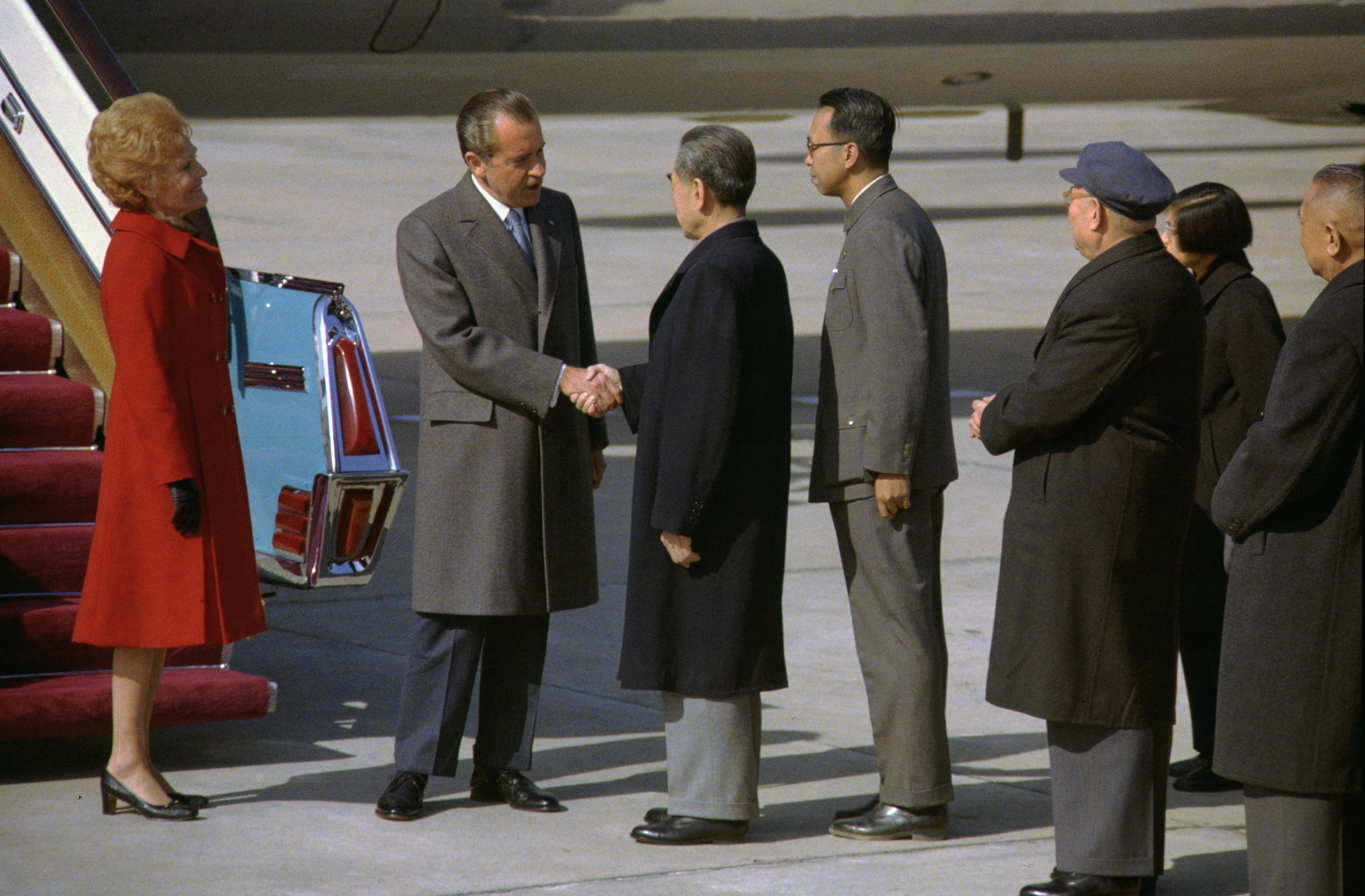
- U.S. president Richard Nixon shakes hands with Chinese premier Zhou Enlai at Beijing Capital International Airport. Richard Nixon and Mao Zedong commemorative issue
- Date: 21 to 28 February 1972
- Location: Shanghai; Beijing; Hangzhou
- Type: State visit
- Participants: President Richard Nixon; First Lady Pat Nixon

From February 21 to 28, 1972, the president of the United States Richard Nixon visited Beijing, capital of the People's Republic of China (PRC) in the culmination of his administration's efforts to establish relations with the PRC after years of U.S. diplomatic policy that favored the Republic of China in Taiwan. His visit was the first time a U.S. president had visited the PRC, with his arrival ending 23 years of no official diplomatic ties between the two countries. Nixon visited the PRC to gain more leverage over relations with the Soviet Union, following the Sino-Soviet split. The normalization of ties culminated in 1979, when the Carter administration transferred diplomatic recognition from Taipei to Beijing and established full relations with the PRC.

When the Chinese Communist Party (CCP) gained power over mainland China in 1949 and the Kuomintang retreated to the island of Taiwan (a former Qing prefecture turned Japanese colony that was acquired following the surrender of Japan in 1945) after the de facto end of the Chinese Civil War, the United States continued to recognize the Republic of China (ROC) as the sole government of China, now based out of Taipei. There were no diplomatic relations between Communist China and the United States and relations were hostile.

Before his election as president in 1968, former vice president Richard Nixon hinted at establishing a new relationship with the PRC. Early in his first term, Nixon, through his national security advisor Henry Kissinger, sent subtle overtures hinting at warmer relations to the government of the PRC. After a series of these overtures by both countries, Kissinger flew on secret diplomatic missions to Beijing in 1971, where he met with Chinese premier Zhou Enlai. On July 15, 1971, the President announced on live television that he would visit the PRC the following year.

The visit allowed the American public to view images of mainland China for the first time in over two decades. Throughout the week the President and his senior advisers engaged in substantive discussions with the PRC leadership, including a meeting with CCP chairman Mao Zedong, while First Lady Pat Nixon toured schools, factories and hospitals in the cities of Beijing, Hangzhou and Shanghai with the large American press corps in tow. Nixon dubbed his visit "the week that changed the world", a descriptor that continues to echo in the political lexicon. Repercussions of the Nixon visit continue to this day; near-immediate results included a significant shift in the Cold War balance, driving an ideological wedge between the Soviet Union and the People's Republic of China, resulting in significant Soviet concessions and its eventual fall.

The consequences of Nixon's trip to China continue to impact politics today. Writing on the 40th anniversary of the trip, Jeffrey Bader said that the basic bargain to put common interests ahead of ideology and values which both Nixon and Mao sought had been substantially held by both the Democratic and Republican parties. Also, a "Nixon to China" moment has since become a metaphor to refer to the ability of a politician with an unassailable reputation among their supporters for representing and defending their values to take actions that would draw their criticism and even opposition if taken by someone without those credentials.

== Visit ==
=== Historical background ===
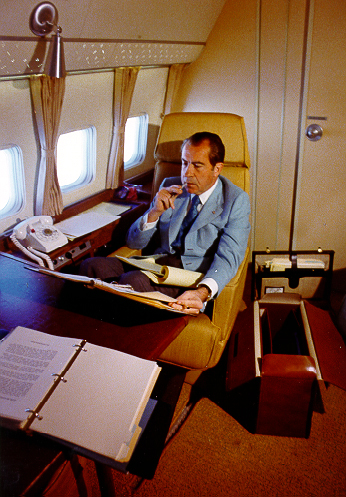
Nixon flies to China on Air Force 1.

Improved relations with the Soviet Union and the PRC are often cited as the most successful diplomatic achievements of Nixon's presidency. After World War II, the Americans saw relations between the United States and the Soviet Union deteriorating into a Cold War, with the Soviets consolidating communist allies over much of Eastern Europe and East Asia, and the potential victory of CCP forces in the Chinese Civil War. Many Americans were concerned that communism might dominate schools or labor unions.

From the beginning of the Sino-Soviet split in 1956, Chinese leadership looked for external allies to counterbalance the Soviet Union, while the U.S. wanted to gain leverage over the Soviet Union. Resolving the Vietnam War was a particularly important factor. National Security Council staffer (and later U.S. Ambassador to China) Winston Lord noted that, by flexibly dealing with both the Soviet Union and China, the United States sought to pressure both countries to reduce their support for North Vietnam their new prioritization of relations with the United States.

Richard Nixon earned a reputation as a strong anti-communist in the late 1940s and as vice-president to Dwight Eisenhower, yet in 1972 he became the first U.S. president to visit mainland China while in office. Ulysses S. Grant visited China on a world tour after leaving office, and President Herbert Hoover lived in China as a mining manager from 1899 to 1901, and understood basic expressions in Mandarin. Eisenhower made a state visit to Taiwan in 1960, during the period when the United States recognized the Republic of China government in Taipei as the sole government of China.

=== Readiness ===
In July 1971, President Nixon's National Security Advisor Henry Kissinger secretly visited Beijing during a trip to Pakistan, and laid the groundwork for Nixon's visit to China. This meeting was arranged and facilitated by Pakistan through its strong diplomatic channels with China. Transcripts of White House meetings and once confidential documents show Nixon began working to open a channel of communication with Beijing from his first day in the White House. For this ambitious goal to be reached President Nixon had carried out a series of carefully calibrated moves through Communist China's allies Romania and Pakistan. This included offering support to Pakistan during the 1971 Bangladesh Liberation War.

Nixon announced on national television on 15 July, to the public's surprise, that he would visit China.

== Travel to China ==
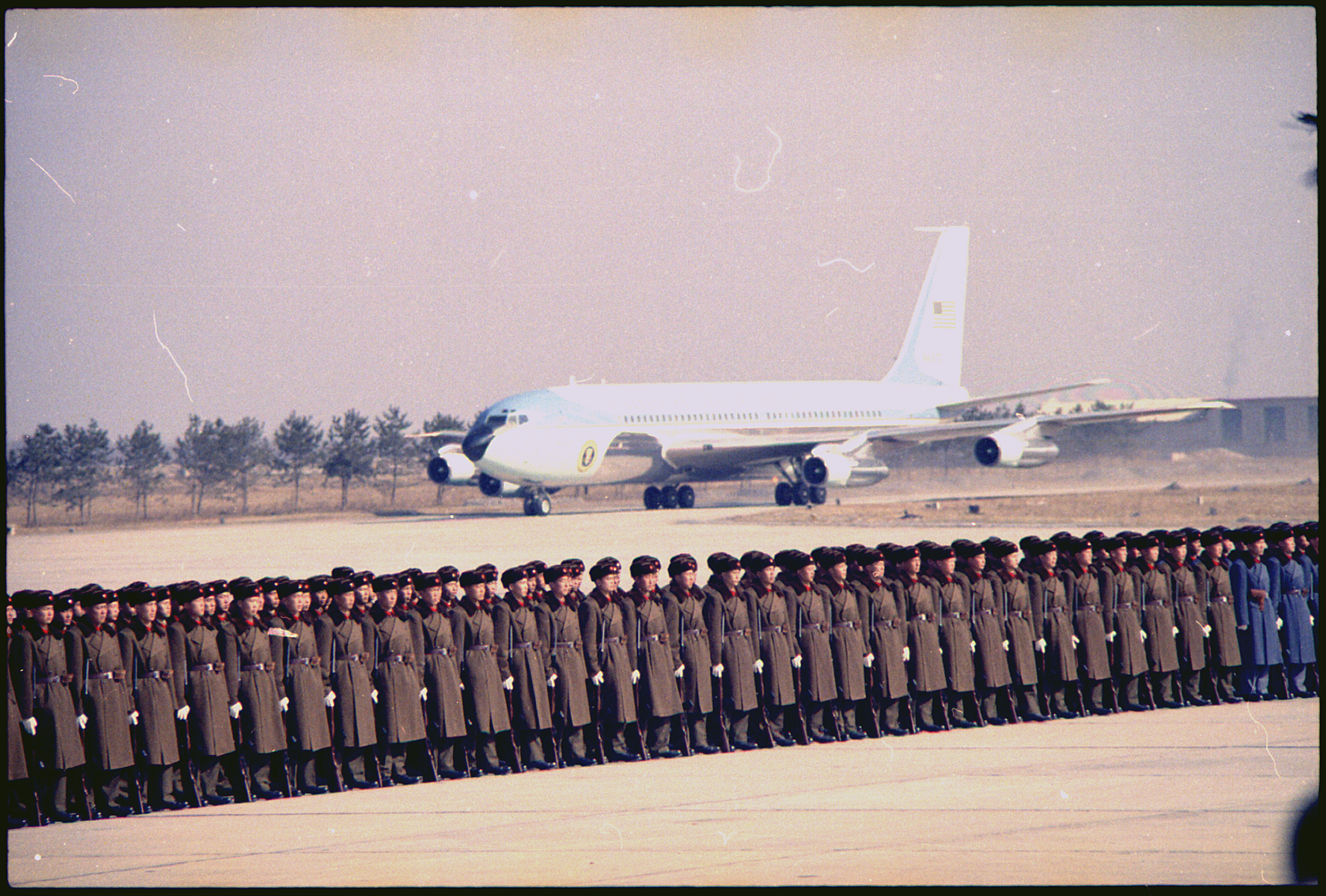
Air Force One landing in Beijing on February 21, 1972. American staff were surprised by the small crowd at the welcoming reception.

President Nixon, his wife, and their entourage left the White House on February 17, 1972, spending a night at Kaneohe Marine Corps Air Station in Oahu, Hawaii. They arrived the next day in Guam at 5 pm, where they spent the night at Nimitz Hill Annex, the residence of the Commander Naval Forces Marianas. At 7 am on February 21, the Nixons departed on a four-hour flight from Guam to Shanghai; after arrival, they then traveled to Beijing.

=== Meeting with Mao ===
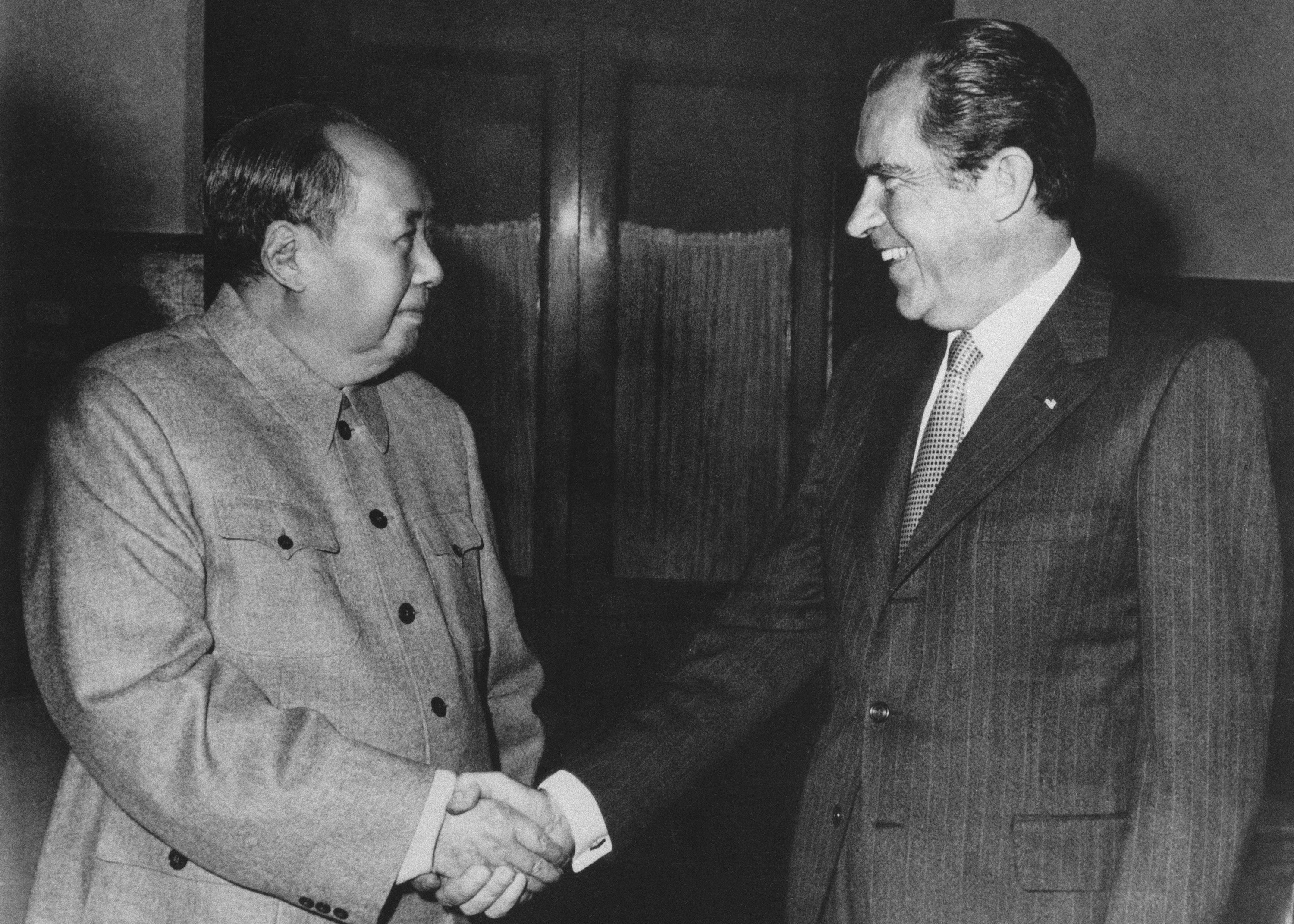
Nixon and Mao shaking hands on February 21, 1972

From February 21 to 28, 1972, U.S. President Richard Nixon traveled to Beijing, Hangzhou, and Shanghai. Almost as soon as the American president arrived in the Chinese capital, CCP Chairman Mao Zedong beckoned him for a quick meeting. Kissinger and his assistant Winston Lord were also present. To avoid embarrassing Secretary of State William P. Rogers, Nixon requested to the Chinese for Lord to be cropped out of all the official photographs of the meeting.

Unknown to Nixon and the rest of the American diplomats at the time, Mao was in poor health and he had been hospitalized for several weeks up to only nine days before Nixon's arrival. Nevertheless, Mao felt well enough to insist to his officials that he would meet with Nixon upon his arrival. Upon being introduced to Nixon for the first time, Mao, speaking through his translator, said to Nixon: "I believe our old friend Chiang Kai-shek would not approve of this". Mao also joked that "I voted for you during your last election." Nixon, charmed, said "you voted for the lesser of two evils," and Mao replied, "I like rightists... I am comparatively happy when these people on the right come into power."

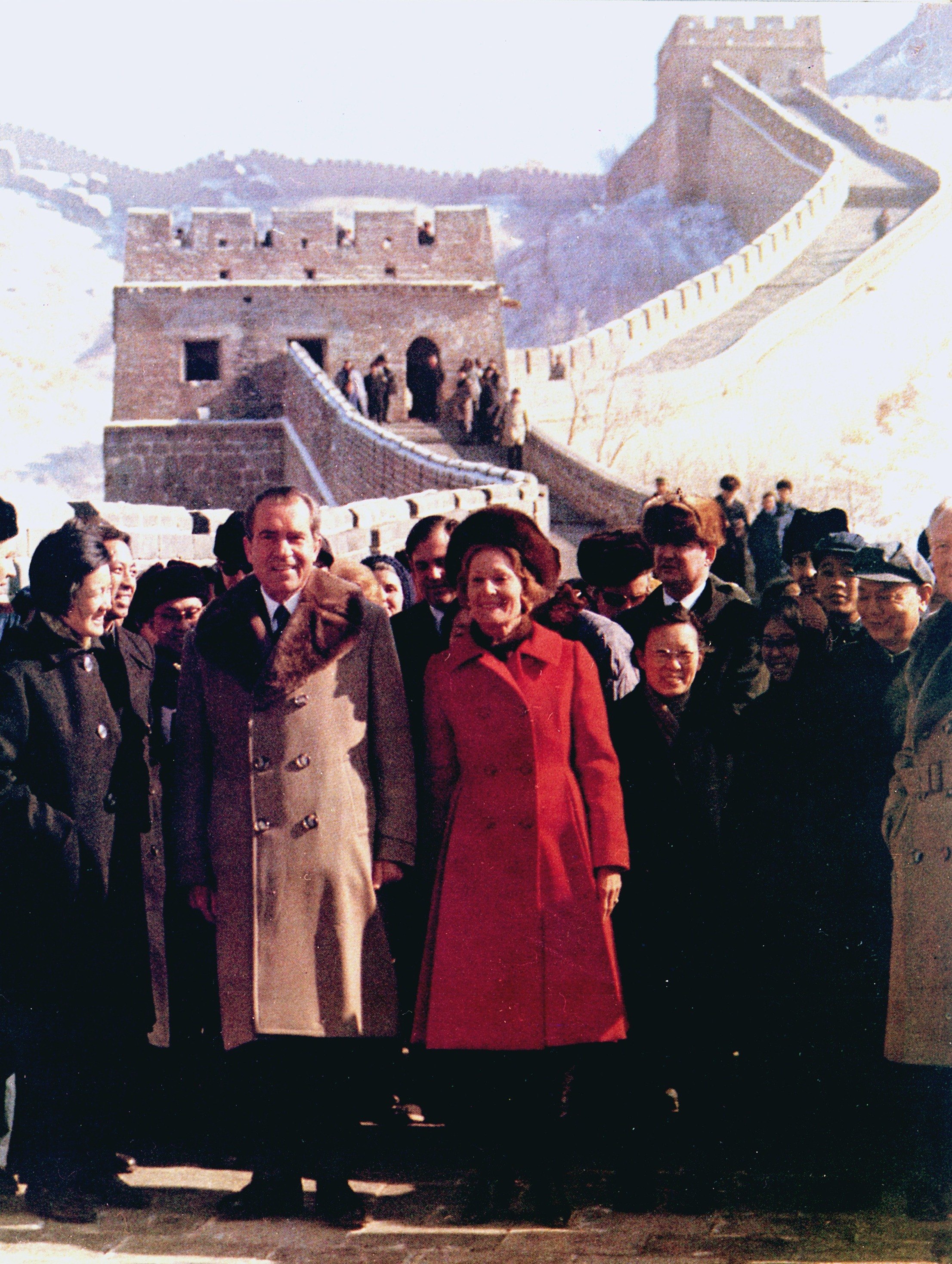
Richard and Pat Nixon with Chinese delegates at the Great Wall

As an observer of the Mao–Nixon meeting, Lord noted Mao's peasant-like sensibilities and self-deprecating humor. Mao spoke simply and inelegantly, but clearly communicated approval of the visit and its diplomatic utility. Lord described Mao's purposeful and episodic language as a "very skillful performance."

=== Other activities ===
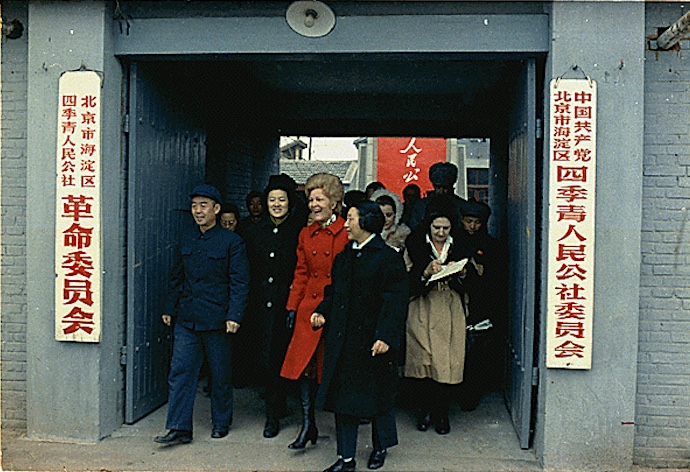
Pat Nixon in Beijing

Nixon held many meetings with Chinese Premier Zhou Enlai during the trip, and made visits to the Great Wall, Hangzhou, and Shanghai. Nixon's porcelain swans statue, a gift to Mao, was presented along the way in the gift-giving ceremony. At the Great Wall, Nixon stated, "This is a Great Wall and it had to be built by a great people."

Meanwhile, First Lady Pat Nixon toured local institutions independently, including the Peking Children's Hospital, an acupuncture clinic, a people's commune, and the kitchens of the Peking Hotel. Pat also visited the Peking Zoo (Beijing Zoo) and after expressing her delight over the giant pandas, Premier Zhou gifted two pandas (Ling-Ling and Hsing-Hsing) to the United States not long after.

The couple also attended official banquets in the Great Hall of the People and watched a theatrical ballet performance of The Red Detachment of Women with Mao's wife Jiang Qing, Kissinger, Zhou and other members of the Chinese and American delegation.

Nixon concluded his visit on the morning of February 28, when he left China on a flight to Anchorage, Alaska.

=== Results ===
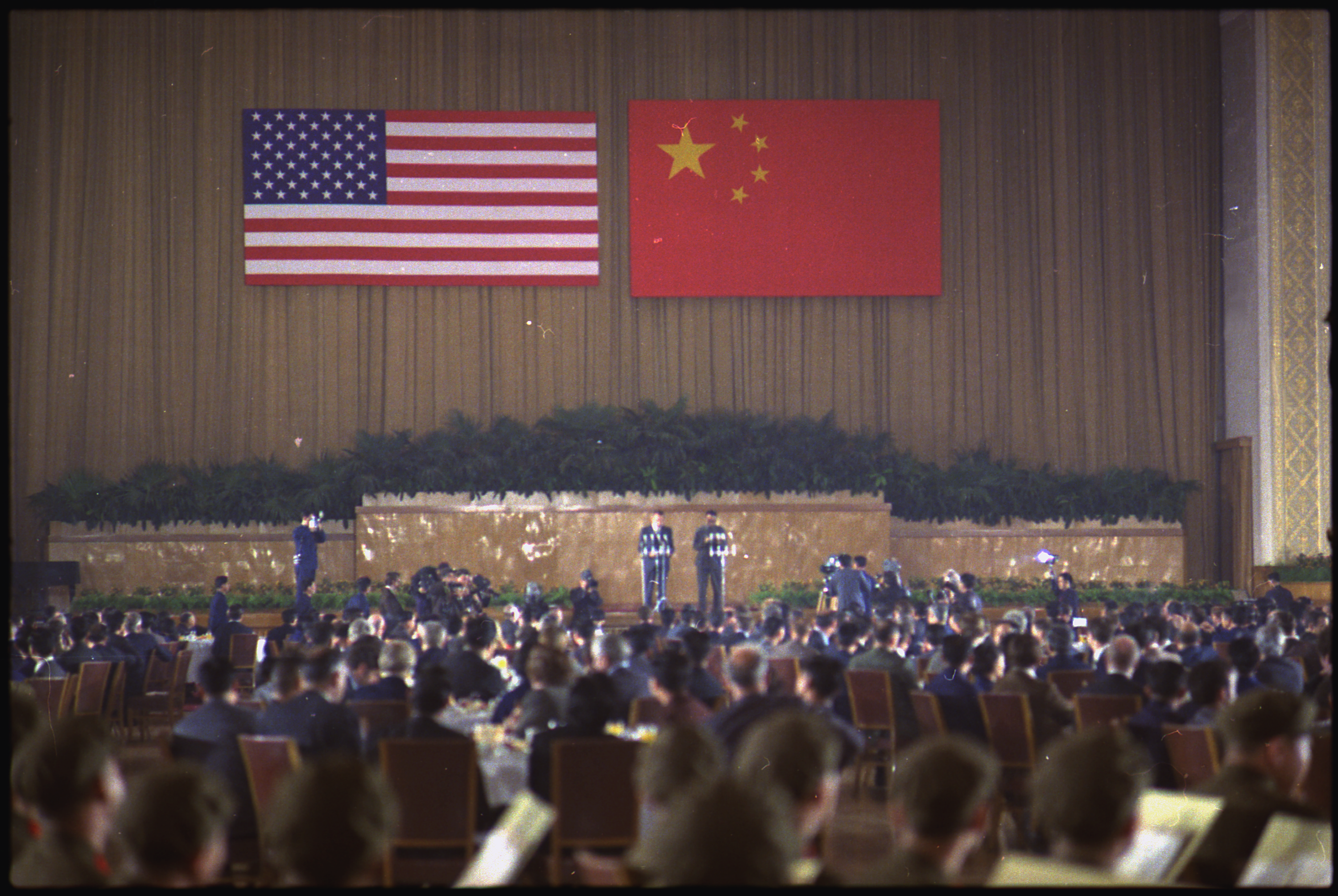
Richard Nixon and Zhou Enlai speaking at a banquet at the Great Hall of the People

February 27 marked the joint issuing of the Shanghai Communiqué, in which both nations pledged to work toward the full normalization of diplomatic policy and acknowledged longstanding differences over Taiwan. The statement allowed the U.S. and PRC to temporarily set aside the "crucial question obstructing the normalization of relations" concerning its political status in order to open trade and other contacts. However, the U.S. continued to maintain official relations with the government of the Republic of China in Taiwan and did not break off until 1979, when the U.S. established full diplomatic relations with the PRC.

While in Shanghai, Nixon spoke about what this meant for the two countries in the future:

This was the week that changed the world, as what we have said in that Communique is not nearly as important as what we will do in the years ahead to build a bridge across 16,000 miles and 22 years of hostilities which have divided us in the past. And what we have said today is that we shall build that bridge.

Within a year of Nixon's visit, a number of U.S. allies including Japan, Australia, and West Germany broke relations with Taiwan in order to establish diplomatic ties with China.

==== Aftermath ====
Nixon and his aides carefully planned the trip to have the biggest possible impact on television audiences in the United States. The media coverage of the trip was overwhelmingly positive and presented Nixon communicating with Chinese government officials, attending dinners, and being accorded tours with other people of influence. Later interviews with correspondents who traveled with the President show how eager they were to be on the trip, which some labeled the most important summit meeting ever. Max Frankel of The New York Times received the Pulitzer Prize for International Reporting for his coverage of the event.

Meanwhile, Taiwan (the Republic of China) viewed U.S. President Richard Nixon's 1972 visit to mainland China as a bitter betrayal and a devastating diplomatic shock. President Chiang Kai-shek expressed deep anger over Nixon's visit to China. The ROC's Ministry of Foreign Affairs issued a formal protest, stating that the mainland regime was a "rebel group" with no right to represent the Chinese people.

Japan and South Korea also reacted to Nixon's visit with intense shock and a sense of betrayal, as it was made without prior consultation. Both nations feared the U.S. détente would weaken Washington's alliance commitment and embolden other hostile states such as North Korea.

The aftermath of the Watergate scandal later in 1972 led Nixon to deprioritize further diplomatic efforts with the PRC. This resulted in putting off deliberations over the establishment of a hotline between DC and Beijing, which was first proposed during the visit to China and discussed between Kissinger and Zhou in November 1973 meetings. The Beijing-Washington hotline was later created in 2007.

Nixon in China. A film by Richard Nixon Presidential Library and Museum.

In fall 1971, Vietnam Prime Minister Phạm Văn Đồng had unsuccessfully asked Mao to cancel the planned Nixon visit. The process of China and the United States improving their relationship was interpreted by Vietnamese leadership as a betrayal of the China-Vietnam relationship and created tensions.

The visit inspired John Adams' 1987 opera Nixon in China. It was also the subject of a PBS documentary film, American Experience: Nixon's China Game.

Nixon's visit played a role in leading to the September 1972 Japan–China Joint Communiqué. In his discussion with Japanese PM Kakuei Tanaka, Mao Zedong recounted, "I told Nixon, 'I voted for you when you ran for President. You still don't know.'" Mao said that he had no interest in Japan's Communist Party, and "also voted" for Kakuei Tanaka.

Nixon's visit played a role in opening China to U.S. trade eventually putting downward pressure on U.S. inflation.

As prospects of China-U.S. rapprochement improved following the visit, China's focus on its Third Front campaign to develop basic and heavy industry in its rugged interior gradually declined. Rapprochement between the United States and China decreased the fear of invasion which, along with fears of Soviet invasion, had motivated the Third Front construction.

In 1979, there was a state visit by Deng Xiaoping to the United States from January to February, the first official visit to the U.S. by a senior leader of the P.R.C. Deng met with then-sitting President Jimmy Carter and ex-President Nixon at a state dinner in the White House.

== See also ==
- Nixon goes to China
- Ping-pong diplomacy
- Dixie mission
- State visit by Deng Xiaoping to the United States
- 2015 state visit by Xi Jinping to the United States
- 2026 state visit by Xi Jinping to the United States
- 2017 state visit by Donald Trump to China
- 2026 state visit by Donald Trump to China

General:

- China and the United Nations
