= List of international presidential trips made by Donald Trump to China =

Donald Trump has made 2 state visits to China as president of the United States:

- 2017 state visit, during his first presidency
- 2026 state visit, during his second presidency
