= State visit by Xi Jinping to the United States =

State visit by Xi Jinping to the United States may refer to:

- 2015 state visit by Xi Jinping to the United States
- 2026 state visit by Xi Jinping to the United States
