= Nixon's China Game =

- Genre: Documentary
- Country of origin: United States
- Original language: English

Production
- Running time: 59 minutes

Original release
- Release: January 31, 2000

Nixon's China Game is a documentary on Richard Nixon's 1972 visit to China. It won a 1999 Peabody Award.
