= 2026 state visit by Xi Jinping to the United States =

Meeting between China and US leaders

- Part of China–United States relations
- President Donald Trump and first lady Melania Trump with Xi Jinping and Peng Liyuan in the Oval Office
- Date: September 23–25, 2026
- Location: Washington, D.C.
- Participants: Xi Jinping; Donald Trump

From September 23 to 25, 2026, Xi Jinping, the general secretary of the Chinese Communist Party and president of China, and his wife Peng Liyuan made a state visit to the United States, hosted by President Donald Trump and First Lady Melania Trump. It reciprocated Trump's state visit to China in May 2026. It was Xi's second state visit to the US; his first occurred in September 2015. It was also his sixth US visit since he assumed power in 2012.

Trump personally welcomed Xi at Joint Base Andrews, marking the first time since 1962 that a U.S. president had personally greeted a foreign leader at the base, other than the pope. A welcoming ceremony was held there. During the visit, Xi was received by Trump at the White House, where the two leaders held talks at the Oval Office and went to the White House Rose Garden for a military troop review. Trump later hosted Xi for a state dinner. The following day, the two leaders participated in a tea ceremony at the White House before visiting the National Archives of the United States, where they viewed the founding documents of the United States. Xi and Peng subsequently concluded their visit and returned to China.

The visit was followed by Trump's trip to Shenzhen for APEC China 2026 in November and is set to be followed by Xi's upcoming visit to the United States for the 2026 G20 Miami summit.

== Background ==
During the Busan Summit on October 30, 2025, US president Donald Trump invited Chinese leader Xi Jinping to visit the United States at an appropriate time. During his May 2026 state visit to China, Trump invited Xi to the White House in September. On July 23, Trump said that Xi would be visiting on 24 September. On September 4, Reuters reported that Xi would be travelling with a large business delegation. However, The Wall Street Journal reported on September 22 that Xi was unlikely to bring a business delegation. This was Xi's first visit to the White House after 11 years. The state dinner was also the second one held during the second Trump administration, following the one held for King Charles III during his state visit in April 2026.

On September 20, 2026, Chinese vice premier He Lifeng met with US secretary of treasury Scott Bessent and Trade Representative Jamieson Greer in New York City, where they agreed to set up an AI dialogue. On September 21, the Chinese foreign ministry announced that Xi would pay a state visit ‌to the US from September 23 to 25. The ministry spokesperson Guo Jiakun said that two heads of state's reciprocal visits within a six-month period are "of historic, milestone significance". On September 23, Chinese ambassador to the US Xie Feng wrote an article in the People's Daily, saying China and the US should manage their differences in good faith, and that the US should stop fabricating pretexts such as national security, economic imbalances and forced labor in trying to constrain China. He added that "China's sovereignty, security, and development interests cannot be violated, and four red lines — the Taiwan question, democracy and human rights, development paths and systems, and development rights — cannot be challenged". Shortly after Xi arrived to the US on September 23, Treasury Secretary Bessent announced that the trade truce between the two countries, reached at the Busan Summit and was set to expire on November 10, would be extended until January 10, 2027. On September 24, Chinese defense ministry spokesperson Jiang Bin said that "it should be emphasized that the Taiwan question is the most important in China–US relations and maintaining peace and stability in the Taiwan Strait is the greatest common issue of the two countries and that "it is hoped that the US side will handle the Taiwan issue with extreme caution".

Due to Trump's recent ban of several news outlets from the White House, most of Xi's state visit was not covered by the White House press pool. ABC World News Tonight placed the news of Xi's as the third item, with only photos and no video. CNN reported that the Chinese side had informally expressed its concerns to the United States that the boycott would affect the coverage of the visit. On September 24, the Trump administration returned the press credentials to the three media outlets, but still excluded CNN. The opening remarks of the summit meeting that day were not made public to the media as is customary, meaning the only publicly available video recording of the meeting was the segment broadcast by China Central Television. On Truth Social, Trump expressed his anger that the press pool had "refused to cover one of the Biggest and Most Beautiful Events to take place in many years". The press pool resumed its coverage of Trump on September 25 after the administration reinstated the news outlets.

=== Arrangements ===
According to the visit schedule announced by the White House, Xi Jinping and his wife Peng Liyuan would arrive at Andrews Air Force Base on September 23. President Trump and First Lady Melania Trump would greet the couple at the airport and held a welcoming ceremony. On September 24, the Trump couple would greet Xi and Peng at the White House, followed by a guard of honor review in the Rose Garden before the summit meeting. About a month before the trip, the Chinese advance team declined a working lunch between Xi and President Trump on September 24. That evening, a state dinner would be held in the East Room of the White House, which would be attended by several heads of American technology giants. Xi was scheduled for breaks between events in the West Wing's "hold room" with only Peng permitted to accompany him. On September 25, the Trump couple would host a tea party for Xi and Peng at the White House, and the two sides would then visit the National Archives of the United States to see founding documents of the United States. After the trip, Xi and Peng would return to Andrews Air Force Base and leave the United States by special plane.

The guest list for the state dinner included:

List
  - Donald Trump, president of the United States
  - Melania Trump, first lady of the United States
  - Xi Jinping, general secretary of the Chinese Communist Party and president of China
  - Peng Liyuan, first lady of China
  - JD Vance, vice president of the United States
  - Usha Vance, second lady of the United States
  - Marco Rubio, secretary of state
  - Jeanette Dousdebes Rubio, spouse of the secretary of state
  - Susie Wiles, White House chief of staff
  - David Perdue, US ambassador to China
  - Scott Bessent, secretary of the treasury
  - Pete Hegseth, secretary of defense
  - Jamieson Greer, US trade representative
  - Cai Qi, director of the General Office of the Chinese Communist Party
  - Wang Yi, director of the Office of the Central Foreign Affairs Commission and minister of foreign affairs
  - He Lifeng, vice premier of State Council
  - Zheng Shanjie, chairman of the National Development and Reform Commission
  - Wang Wentao, minister of commerce
  - Ma Zhaoxu, executive vice foreign minister
  - Xie Feng, Chinese ambassador to the United States
  - Ivanka Trump, daughter of Donald Trump
  - Eric Trump, son of Donald Trump
  - Lara Trump, daughter-in-law of Donald Trump
  - Tiffany Trump, daughter of Donald Trump
  - Michael Boulos, son-in-law of Donald Trump
  - Viktor Knavs, father of Melania Trump
  - Arabella Kushner, granddaughter of Donald Trump
  - Jensen Huang, CEO of Nvidia
  - Lori Huang, spouse of Jensen Huang
  - Mark Zuckerberg, CEO of Meta Platforms
  - Lisa Su, CEO of AMD
  - Tim Cook, executive chairman of Apple Inc.
  - John F.W. Rogers, Goldman Sachs EVP and secretary to the board
  - Lynn Martin, president of the New York Stock Exchange
  - Linda G. Mills, president of New York University
  - Eric Yuan, CEO of Zoom Communications
  - Tang Fangyu director of the Central Policy Research Office
  - Lan Fo'an, minister of finance
  - Zhou Hongxu, deputy director of the General Office of the CCP Central Committee and director of the Central Guard Bureau
  - Lyu Luhua, secretary to the president
  - Hong Lei, assistant foreign minister and director general of the Protocol Department
  - Cai Wei, assistant foreign minister and director general of the Department of North American and Oceanian Affairs
  - Mao Ning, director general of the Department of Press, Communication and Public Diplomacy of the Ministry of Foreign Affairs
  - Zhang Quan, secretary to Peng Liyuan
  - Zhang Yongchao, deputy director general of the Department of North American and Oceanian Affairs of the Ministry of Foreign Affairs
  - Kelly Ortberg, CEO of Boeing
  - Larry Fink, CEO of BlackRock
  - Stephen A. Schwarzman, CEO of Blackstone Inc.
  - Sam Altman, CEO of OpenAI
  - Greg Brockman, president and co-founder of OpenAI
  - Anna Brockman, wife of Greg Brockman
  - Miriam Adelson, controlling shareholder of the Las Vegas Sands
  - Sergey Brin, co-founder of Alphabet Inc.
  - Satya Nadella, chairman & CEO of Microsoft
  - James Taiclet, chairman, president, and CEO of Lockheed Martin
  - Sundar Pichai, CEO of Google
  - Larry Culp, CEO of GE Aerospace
  - Sanjay Mehrotra, CEO of Micron Technology
  - Cristiano Amon, CEO of Qualcomm
  - Jeff Bezos, executive chairman of Amazon
  - Lauren Sánchez Bezos, spouse of Jeff Bezos
  - Jeff Yass, TikTok investor
  - Jamie Dimon, CEO of JPMorgan Chase
  - Michael Dell, CEO of Dell
  - Mary Barra, CEO of General Motors
  - David M. Solomon, CEO of Goldman Sachs
  - Jane Fraser, CEO of Citigroup
  - Elon Musk, CEO of SpaceX and Tesla, Inc.
  - Darren Woods, CEO of ExxonMobil
  - John Roberts, chief justice of the United States
  - Jane Sullivan Roberts, spouse of John Roberts
  - Amy Coney Barrett, associate justice of the Supreme Court
  - Brett Kavanaugh, associate justice of the Supreme Court
  - Mike Johnson, speaker of the US House of Representatives
  - Bret Baier, Fox News host
  - Laura Ingraham, Fox News presenter
  - Rich McCormick, US representative
  - Jesse Watters, Fox News host
  - David Ellison, CEO of Paramount Skydance
  - Kevin Warsh, chairman of the Federal Reserve
  - Howard Lutnick, secretary of commerce
  - John Ratcliffe, director of the Central Intelligence Agency
  - Steve Witkoff, US special envoy to Middle East
  - Stephen Miller, deputy chief of staff for policy and homeland security advisor
  - Katie Miller, spouse of Stephen Miller
  - Dan Scavino, deputy chief of staff and assistant to the president
  - Todd Blanche, US attorney general
  - Meredith O'Rourke, political fundraiser
  - Chris Wright, secretary of energy
  - Robert F. Kennedy Jr., secretary of health & human services
  - Linda McMahon, secretary of education
  - Doug Burgum, secretary of the interior
  - Sean Duffy, secretary of transportation
  - Russell Vought, director of the Office of Management & Budget
  - Lee Zeldin, administrator of the Environmental Protection Agency
  - Keith Sonderling, acting secretary of labor
  - Brad Gerstner, CEO of Altimeter Capital
  - Albert Bourla, CEO of Pfizer
  - David Sacks, co-chair of the President's Council of Advisors on Science and Technology
  - Kelly Loeffler, administrator of the Small Business Administration
  - Katie Simpson, fiancé of Brad Gerstner
  - Jason Smith, US representative
  - Steven Daines, US senator
  - Dan Caine, chairman of the Joint Chiefs of Staff
  - Jay Clayton, director of national intelligence
  - Bernard Arnault, CEO of LVMH
  - Ryan McInerey, CEO of Visa Inc.
  - Michael Miebach, CEO of Mastercard
  - Cheryl Hines, spouse of Secretary Kennedy

== Visit ==
=== September 23 ===
President Donald Trump and the First Lady Melania Trump greeting President Xi Jinping and his wife Peng Liyuan at Joint Base Andrews

In the afternoon of 23 September, Beijing time, Xi Jinping boarded an Air China plane and left Beijing for Washington, D.C. He was accompanied by his wife Peng Liyuan, as well as Chinese Communist Party General Office director Cai Qi and Central Foreign Affairs Commission Office director and foreign minister Wang Yi. President Trump and First Lady Melania Trump left the White House at 16:39 EDT (UTC−4:00), and later arrived at Joint Base Andrews in Maryland. Xi's Air China plane landed at the base at 17:40, and a red carpet was placed for the Chinese delegation, who were also greeted by battery salute, three color teams carrying American and Chinese flags, and platoons from each military service. Trump personally greeted Xi, the first time the US president has greeted a foreign leader except the Pope at the base since John F. Kennedy met British prime minister Harold Macmillan in 1962. The United States Air Force Band played the national anthems of China and the United States and a 21-gun salute was fired on site. Two Rockwell B-1 Lancer bombers flew overhead to celebrate Xi's arrival. Xi said that China and the United States should be partners rather than rivals, and stated that "they should meet each other halfway and promote the formation of a stable relationship with cooperation as the main focus, competition with moderation, differences that can be controlled, and peace that can be expected, and find a way for the two major powers, China and the United States, to get along correctly in the new era." Trump walked Xi to his car, and afterwards departed to the Marine One by the presidential state car for a flight back to the White House. On the way to the hotel where Xi's delegation was staying, local overseas Chinese and students waved the national flags of China and the United States to welcome his visit.

=== September 24 ===
President Donald Trump and First Lady Melania Trump greet Xi Jinping and his wife Peng Liyuan to the White House.

At 10:07 on 24 September, Xi and Peng arrived at the White House, where they were greeted by President Trump and First Lady Melania Trump. Following the welcome ceremony, they entered the White House, and the national anthems of both countries were played. Trump gave a speech commenting on their history, saying "I'm delighted to welcome you to the beautiful White House. Such a great honor. In May, we had the great privilege of visiting you in Beijing, where you received our delegation with spectacular and very beautiful hospitality. Now, Melania and I are honored to host you in Washington," and "From the time of my first election in 2016, President Xi and I have forged a friendship, a truly great friendship, actually, built on mutual respect and the vital interests of our people", and that China and the United States have made "tremendous strides on the issues facing our two countries". He said the two nations were working together for a "more balanced trading relationship" including "new market access for American farmers and ranches". He added the two sides would discuss "security, technology and super intelligence" to "promote peace and prosperity for decades and decades to come". He said "our two countries do, really, the same thing - and we're very proud of it, and the relationship". Trump referenced the Sino-American alliance in World War II, saying "Look at the greatness that we had together, fighting in World War II", and that "brave American pilots" had fought for "the very survival of the legendary country". He mentioned the US Marine Corps adopting the term "gung ho", meaning working together from Chinese, and that he would continue to work together with Xi.

Xi Jinping delivering remarks at the White House.

Afterwards, Xi gave a speech, stating he was glad to visit the "beautiful" United States, thanked Trump for the hospitality and said "On behalf of the 1.4 billion and more Chinese people, I wish to begin by extending sincere greetings to the American people and the warm congratulations on the 250th anniversary of the US independence". He said both countries are great countries with great people, and that he was visiting to continue the friendship and expand co-operation. He added that as two major countries, China and the US show "their historic responsibility of advancing human development and progress". He also said that he is ready to "work with Trump to steer the giant ship of the China-US relationship towards a steady future". Xi said that "China and the US are different... but through candid, in-depth, and continued dialogue, our two countries can understand each other better... and build up mutual trust". He stated he and Trump had "respect" for each other and stayed in touch, and that "We should co-operate with sincerity". He said even though cooperation between the two nations "may not solve every problem in the world", it would be hard to solve major problems without it.

Donald Trump and Melania Trump participating in a Silent Drill Platoon Review with Xi Jinping and Peng Liyuan

Xi said "China keeps its door wide open, welcomes American companies wanting to invest and do business there" and hoped that "Chinese companies are treated fairly here in the US". Xi said "Both China and the United States are leading nations in artificial intelligence. We have both the capability and responsibility to develop and manage AI for good, and ensure that the development of AI is always under human control and serves the well-being of the people". He called for cooperation on trade. He said "We do not need to avoid mentioning competition, but our competition should be a healthy one and should be kept within bounds" and that "It should be a race of catching up with one another, not a wrestle in which one either wins or loses. China and the United States must hold the line of no conflict and no confrontation between us". Xi said the militaries "should maintain regular dialog and improve mechanisms for crisis communication and prevention. The 'Thucydides trap' can be overcome". Xi said Chinese and US soldiers have fought "shoulder to shoulder against fascist aggression" and that "Chinese people have never forgotten that part of history, nor have the American people". He announced an invitation for 100,000 young Americans to study in exchange programmes in China over the next five years. He also announced two pandas, Ping Ping and Fu Shuang, would be sent to Zoo Atlanta. He concluded his speech by saying that "great rejuvenation of the Chinese nation and making America great again can go hand in hand" and that "Let us meet the people's expectations and show our historical initiative, let us keep advancing the cause of friendship between our two peoples and work together to build a better world".

Donald Trump and Melania Trump participating in a Military Review with Xi Jinping and Peng Liyuan

Afterwards, the two leaders and their wives, respective delegations and special guests, for example, Cai Qi, Wang Yi, JD and Usha Vance, Ivanka Trump, proceeded to the White House Rose Garden for a Military Review. The United States Air Force Honor Guard presenting American and Chinese flags were positioned on the West Wing Colonnade roof; BBC News observed it is "highly unusual to see uniformed soldiers standing at attention above the Oval Office" and remarked the welcome for Xi "has far exceeded the welcome given other visiting heads of state in Trump's second term". The 15‑minute ceremony included the Old Guard Fife and Drum Corps dressed in Continental Army dress uniforms, the US Marine Corps Silent Drill Platoon and the United States Marine Drum and Bugle Corps performances with a flyover finale featuring a B-2 Spirit and four F-22 Raptors.

Then the two leaders and their respective contingents entered the Oval Office for a bilateral meeting lasting about ninety minutes. Xi was accompanied by CCP General Office Director Cai Qi, Vice Premier He Lifeng, Central Foreign Affairs Commission Office Director and Foreign Minister Wang Yi, National Development and Reform Commission Director Zheng Shanjie, and Minister of Commerce Wang Wentao. Trump was joined by Vice President JD Vance, Secretary of State Marco Rubio, Secretary of Treasury Scott Bessent, White House Chief of Staff Susie Wiles and Secretary of Defense Pete Hegseth.

Donald Trump giving Xi Jinping a tour of the Marine One and the South Lawn Helipad

Meanwhile, Peng Liyuan and Melania Trump visited the Smithsonian Institution’s National Museum of Asian Art, where they spent 45 minutes. Museum director Chase F. Robinson later said Melania had selected the venue. They visited various exhibitions including viewing a jade disk from the Shang dynasty, visiting The Peacock Room, viewing an 18th-century Qianlong-period Chinese porcelain, as well as looking at a scroll painting from the Yuan dynasty. Peng praised the US for its return of Chinese cultural relics to China. Melania and Peng watched American teenagers from the youth choir from Hope Chinese School sing Chinese songs including "Jasmine Flower" and "Songs & Smiles"; Peng encouraged them to continue learning Chinese language and culture.

After exiting the Oval Office, Trump said they had a "great meeting" and the two leaders toured the renovated White House grounds including the new Marine One helicopter on the newly constructed helipad. Trump said of Xi, "He likes granite. He’s an expert on stone, aside from many other things, and he loves good granite". Trump also showed Xi the Presidential Walk of Fame, where he showed him the framed "autopen" in place of former president Joe Biden. They also stopped in front of a framed photograph from their meeting in Beijing in May, with Trump joking "Who is that? I don’t recognize him." According to the Xinhua News Agency, Xi said he "hopes the US side will adhere to the correct position of opposing 'Taiwan independence'", which he said would "lay a solid foundation for U.S.-China strategic cooperation and the development of bilateral relations". Xi also said he supports the US and Iran returning to the Islamabad Memorandum. The leaders also talked about trade, Taiwan, the Middle East, Ukraine and the Korean Peninsula. After the visit, Xi left the White House for a break, while Trump continued working in the White House.

Donald Trump and Melania Trump greeting Xi Jinping and Peng Liyuan for a state dinner

At 19:10, Xi, wearing a Chinese tunic suit, and Peng, who wore a long-sleeved V-neck gown in red, were received by Trump and Melania for the White House state dinner. As the occasion was scheduled close to the Mid-Autumn Festival, the White House played the song "The Moon Represents My Heart" as the entrance music. The dinner was planned by First Lady Melania Trump and consisted of American dishes with subtle Chinese influence. She chose Schramsberg “Blanc De Noir” for the toast, honoring the "Toast of Peace" shared between President Richard Nixon and Premier Zhou Enlai in 1972. Tables were covered with bright red linen tablecloths and were adorned with red candles and red flower arrangements of dahlias and ranunculus; red is a symbol of luck and good fortune in Chinese culture. A three‑course meal of yellow squash velouté, sesame crusted sea bass, and vanilla crémeux & White House honey ice cream was served at the dinner. The dinner was accompanied by musical performances by Christopher Macchio, the United States Marine Band, the United States Marine Drum and Bugle Corps, the United States Army Chorus, and the United States Army Strings. Other members of the Chinese delegation, including Cai Qi and Wang Yi, wore Chinese tunic suits like Xi; while it is common for the Chinese leader to wear such a suit in state dinners, other members of the Chinese delegation usually wore Western suits in other occasions.

Trump gave a speech, saying "we've never gotten along better" and as a "special treat", Xi and Peng could be the first ones to enter the White House State Ballroom, stating "Anybody who wants to walk into a construction site that's nice and clean and sparkling, it's our honor to have you do so". He said "Tonight, we revive the spirit of that first encounter here on American soil as we are joined by some of the top leaders in business, culture and government from our own time" and added "On one side, China draws on thousands of years of history and tradition from Sun Tzu to Sun Yat-sen. For Americans, we inherit a legacy of faith from Jerusalem to Rome, democracy of ancient Athens, the triumphs of Sparta and the freedom proclaimed in Philadelphia 250 years ago". He celebrated the two nations' "foundation of commerce and mutual respect", adding "President Xi and I both understand that we represent different systems, but the ties between our people endure" and that "Americans and Chinese have always exchanged goods, knowledge, customs, and ideas. This has been the foundation of commerce and mutual respect between our countries, and together we can continue to build a relationship that promotes prosperity and security for future generations". A three‑foot tall sculpture of a bald eagle was unveiled and gifted to Xi, which Trump described as a symbolic "embodiment of the free and soaring spirit of America."

Donald Trump and Xi Jinping delivering remarks at the state dinner.

Xi also gave a speech, saying "As I speak, my compatriots in China are celebrating Mid-Autumn Festival – a cherished occasion for family reunions according to Chinese tradition. I wish you all a very happy Mid-Autumn Festival, and my best wishes to you and your families". He praised Trump and his wife's "meticulous care and consideration" and made them "feel truly at home". He said he and Trump are "making history in our bilateral engagements". He added that "We agreed to build a constructive China-US relationship of strategic stability". He noted that George Washington had an interest in collecting Chinese porcelain. He said "more than 80 years ago, the peoples of China and the U.S. fought side by side against Japanese militarist aggression and pioneered the famous Hump Route". He said "During the war of resistance against Japanese aggression, Chinese soldiers and civilians rescued hundreds of American pilots at the cost of hundreds of thousands of Chinese lives. Such a friendship forged in blood and fire will surely live on through the generations". He said that the friendship was further strengthened by ping-pong diplomacy under President Nixon. He said "Like a river that never stops flowing, history never stands still". He called on the nations to "nurture the beautiful flowers of Sino-US friendship" and that "Together, let us write a new chapter in our friendly relations". He said the goals of China and the US are "mutually reinforcing", stating "President Trump has pledged to make American great again" and that Chinese are "committed to achieving great national rejuvenating and Chinese modernization has kept breaking new ground", urging both sides to explore "new approach for major countries to get along". He concluded his speech by giving a toast to the health of President and Mrs. Trump, as well as the further progress between China and the US.

=== September 25 ===
Donald and Melania Trump participate in a tea ceremony with Xi Jinping and Peng Liyuan.

On September 25, Xi and Peng returned to the White House with Donald and Melania Trump. They then attended a tea ceremony in the Red Room. Trump said US farmers "are going to be very happy" with the talks, adding "A lot of very positive things happened, but America is very happy about this visit and I’m sure China is very happy also". He said "We’ve had a tremendous visit from two spectacular people" and "We’ve really enjoyed it and I think we’ve been tremendous strides. We’ve made great strides, very positive for both countries." During this tea ceremony, Xi said that he and Trump "are like two people who are charting the course for the great ship of China-U.S. relations." Xi also confirmed that two leaders will to see each other later this year in twice, including APEC summit in Shenzhen and G20 Summit in Miami.

Donald Trump and Melania Trump visiting the US National Archives with Xi Jinping and Peng Liyuan.

Later, Xi and Trump visited the National Archives, and viewed the Declaration of Independence, the Constitution and the Bill of Rights. They spent 10 minutes at the National Archives, less than U.S. officials had planned. According to the NPR, a table that included a temporary display showcasing a brick from the Great Wall of China and a 19th-century scroll sent by a Qing emperor was removed because the display also planned to show the Treaty of San Francisco, which China considers as illegitimate because it was not a signatory. Other documents, including Six Assurances and the Three Communiqués, were also discussed for display, but ultimately not included. During the visit to the archives, Xi said that "over the past 250 years, the American people have pursued the American Dream and built a prosperous country and a beautiful home on the North American continent" while "Chinese people, inheriting 5,000 years of Chinese civilization, have continued to make new achievements on the new journey toward realizing the Chinese Dream of the great rejuvenation of the Chinese nation". He said while "China and the United States have different histories and cultures, social systems and development paths", the "people of the two countries share the same aspiration for a better life despite the differences". Trump told reporters that "We’re just comparing. Ours goes 250 years. Which is great, and we’re proud of. Theirs goes 6,000 years. So there’s a little difference between 6,000 and 250. But we’re very proud of our 250." Before the visit finished, Trump gifted Xi a photo album of the trip.

Afterwards, Donald and Melania Trump said goodbye to Xi and Peng at the National Archives. Xi and Peng then left for Joint Base Andrews for their red carpet departure, with representatives of overseas Chinese and international students waving the Chinese and American flags on the road to on way to the airport. Senior US government officials saw them off at the airport, and a 21-gun salute was fired. They then onboarded a plane bound for Beijing, concluding the state visit. They returned to China on the afternoon of September 26.

== Aftermath ==
Donald Trump and Xi Jinping shaking hands in the Oval Office

After the conclusion of the visit, Trump posted on Truth Social, where he confirmed the two leaders would meet again at the APEC China 2026 in Shenzhen in November and the 2026 G20 Miami summit in December. He said "Much has been, and will be, accomplished. I look forward to our next meeting!"

On September 26, the government of China announced that the leaders of China and the United States reached an eight-point consensus, including:

1. Both sides agreed to build a "constructive strategic and stable relationship between China and the United States based on respect, fairness, and equality."
2. Both sides agreed to support each other in successfully hosting the APEC Leaders' Informal Meeting and the G20 Leaders' Summit. The two heads of state expressed their intention to attend the meetings hosted by the other.
3. The two heads of state agreed that Iran should uphold its commitment not to develop nuclear weapons and that no country or organization should impose tolls on international waterways.
4. The two heads of state recalled that China and the United States were allies in World War II and fought side by side to win the war.
5. The two heads of state acknowledged the positive role of the China–US trade consultation mechanism and the results of the consultations between the two trade teams, including the establishment and advancement of mechanisms such as the Council of Trade, the reaching of a $30 billion reciprocal tariff reduction arrangement, and the extension of the Kuala Lumpur trade consultation results, and instructed that these be implemented.
6. Cooperation between Chinese and American drug enforcement agencies has yielded visible results. Recently, the two sides have worked closely together to crack multiple cases involving new psychoactive substances and precursor chemicals, arresting dozens of suspects in both countries.
7. Both sides agreed to establish a China-US artificial intelligence dialogue to exchange views on the risks and benefits of AI. The next dialogue will be held in November this year. Both sides also agreed to establish communication channels for AI-related issues.
8. The US welcomes the arrival of the pair of giant pandas loaned by China to the Atlanta Zoo.

The two countries also agreed to sign a memorandum of understanding as soon as possible to strengthen crisis communication and prevention, and to continue to cooperate in the search for the remains of missing US military personnel in China. The US announced that the reduced tariffs on $30 ‌billion of non-sensitive goods from each side would including agricultural goods, wood and cosmetics, as well as US imports such as small appliances, toys, decorations. The US also said China agreed to import 10 million tons of coals from the US in 2027 and 2028.

Chinese foreign minister Wang Yi said that Xi's visit to the United States "further expanded the connotation of the new positioning of China–US relations", clearly defined respect, fairness and equality, and at the same time "provided clearer strategic guidance for China and the United States to explore the way of major powers getting along". He said that "It means the two countries have equal sovereignty and no one is more superior than the other. None is domineering or abusive and they should resolve their own concerns on an equal footing". Wang also said that Peng Liyuan and Melania Trump's interactions "brought the hearts of the two peoples closer" and that "Warm and personable first-lady diplomacy has injected a softer force into the visit". People's Daily, the official newspaper of the Central Committee of the Chinese Communist Party, said the trip was "Opening up the right path for great powers to coexist" and that "The evolving relationship between China and the United States showcases the fresh air and transformative influence that China, a major eastern power, while steadily marching towards its great rejuvenation, brings to the world".

US ambassador to China David Perdue told Fox News that Trump inquired to Xi about selling weapons to China, saying "President Trump continues to say: hey, we sell arms to other people around the world. He actually asked President Xi would he like to buy some at one point?", though American officials subsequently denied plans of weapons sales to China. Regarding Taiwan, Perdue said "We don’t support independence, and we don’t support coercion". When asked by reporters about discussions on Taiwan in the talks, Trump said "We didn’t talk about it too much. Right now, it’s fine. It’s just moving along. We didn’t spend a lot of time talking about Taiwan. He understands very much how I feel". When introducing the results of the visit, the US side used "super intelligence" instead of "artificial intelligence". In Truth Social, Trump also claimed that Xi agreed on rebranding artificial intelligence to "super intelligence", saying "Like almost everyone else, he seemed to like calling the poorly and inaccurately named Artificial Intelligence to a far more accurate and important name, SUPER INTELLIGENCE" and that "That would be ‘SUPER!’ Everyone last night agreed, also." In response, the spokesperson of the Ministry of Foreign Affairs of China said that China respects the US's use of the term "super intelligence".

Russian President Vladimir Putin commented on the visit, saying that Russia welcomes dialogue between the United States and China, and that whatever results the United States and China achieve will affect the entire world economy. After Xi left the US, President Trump called Japanese Prime Minister Sanae Takaichi. Trump explained to Takaichi the content of his talks with Xi Jinping during the meeting. The two exchanged views on China-related issues. Takaichi said that she and Trump maintained communication before and after Xi's visit, showing the close relationship between the US and Japan. The Yomiuri Shimbun later quoted government officials as saying that during his state visit, Xi criticized Prime Minister Sanae Takaichi and her cabinet for supporting "neo-militarism". Trump in turn called her a “strong leader” and recommended that China engage in negotiations with her. The New York Times later reported in November 2026 that Xi told Trump that Japan's military buildup was threatening to destabilize East Asia and told to be cautious regarding working with Takaichi, who he called "militarist".

== See also ==
- 2017 state visit by Donald Trump to China
- 2026 state visit by Donald Trump to China
- 2026 state visit by Vladimir Putin to China
- 2026 G20 Miami summit
- List of international trips made by Xi Jinping
