= 2026 state visit by Donald Trump to China =

2026 meeting between China and the United States' leaders

- Part of China–United States relations
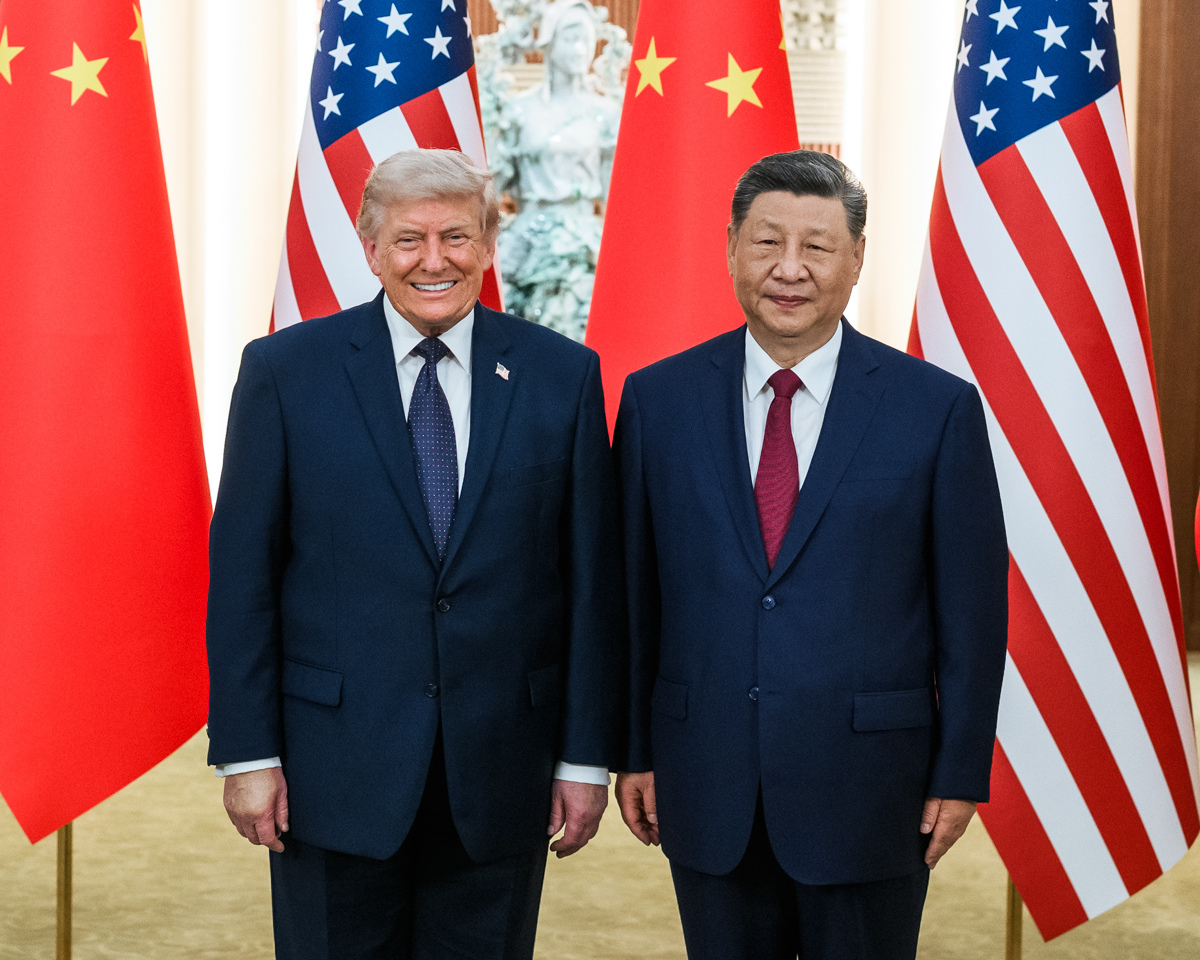
- U.S. president Donald Trump and Chinese leader Xi Jinping in Beijing on 14 May 2026
- Date: 13 to 15 May 2026
- Location: Beijing
- Type: State visit
- Participants: Donald Trump; Xi Jinping

From 13 to 15 May 2026, the president of the United States Donald Trump made a state visit to China. This visit was Trump's second state visit to China, and the first to occur during his second presidency. Trump's first state visit to China occurred in November 2017. This trip was also the first by a U.S. president since Trump's visit in 2017.

During the visit, Trump was received by CCP general secretary Xi Jinping at the Great Hall of the People, where the two leaders held talks. Xi announced the two sides had agreed to establish a Constructive Strategic and Stable Relationship. Following the talks, Xi and Trump visited the Temple of Heaven, the second US president to visit the Temple while in office after President Gerald Ford in 1975. Later, Xi hosted Trump for a dinner banquet at the Golden Room of the Great Hall of the People. Trump invited Xi for a state visit to the United States on 24 September 2026. At the second day of the visit on 15 May, Trump visited the Chinese leadership compound Zhongnanhai.

The visit was the first of the four summits between Xi and Trump in 2026. It was reciprocated by a state visit by Xi Jinping to the United States in September 2026. Additionally, Trump traveled to China for the APEC 2026 in November while Xi is scheduled to visit the United States for the 2026 G20 Miami summit in December.

== Background ==
Chinese Communist Party general secretary Xi Jinping and United States president Donald Trump held their first meeting during Trump's second presidency at the Busan Summit on 30 October 2025. At the meeting, Trump announced plans to visit China in April of the following year and invited Xi to visit the United States at an appropriate time. The state visit was planned for the first week of April, but the meeting was postponed to May due to the 2026 Iran war. On 25 March, The White House announced Trump's visit would last from 12 to 15 May.

In the lead-up to the summit, regional security concerns regarding the conflict with Iran became a key diplomatic focus. On 16 April, Defense Secretary Pete Hegseth announced that Beijing had provided high-level assurances to the White House that it would not send weapons to Iran, explicitly ruling out the potential transfer of surface-to-air missiles to the Iranian military. Hegseth attributed the assurances to the "strong and direct relationship" between President Trump and Xi Jinping, noting that the assurances were vital for the upcoming meeting in Beijing.

U.S. secretary of state Marco Rubio met on 13 February with Wang Yi, director of the Office of the Central Foreign Affairs Commission and foreign minister. The two sides discussed President Donald Trump's planned visit to China. On 30 April, Wang held a phone call with Rubio to conduct preliminary communication regarding subsequent head-of-state diplomacy. Steve Daines led the first bipartisan U.S. Senate delegation to visit China during the second Trump presidency, with the group traveling to Beijing and Shanghai to meet Chinese officials and visit technology companies. On 7 May, Chinese premier Li Qiang and National People's Congress Standing Committee chairman Zhao Leji separately met with the delegation in Beijing.

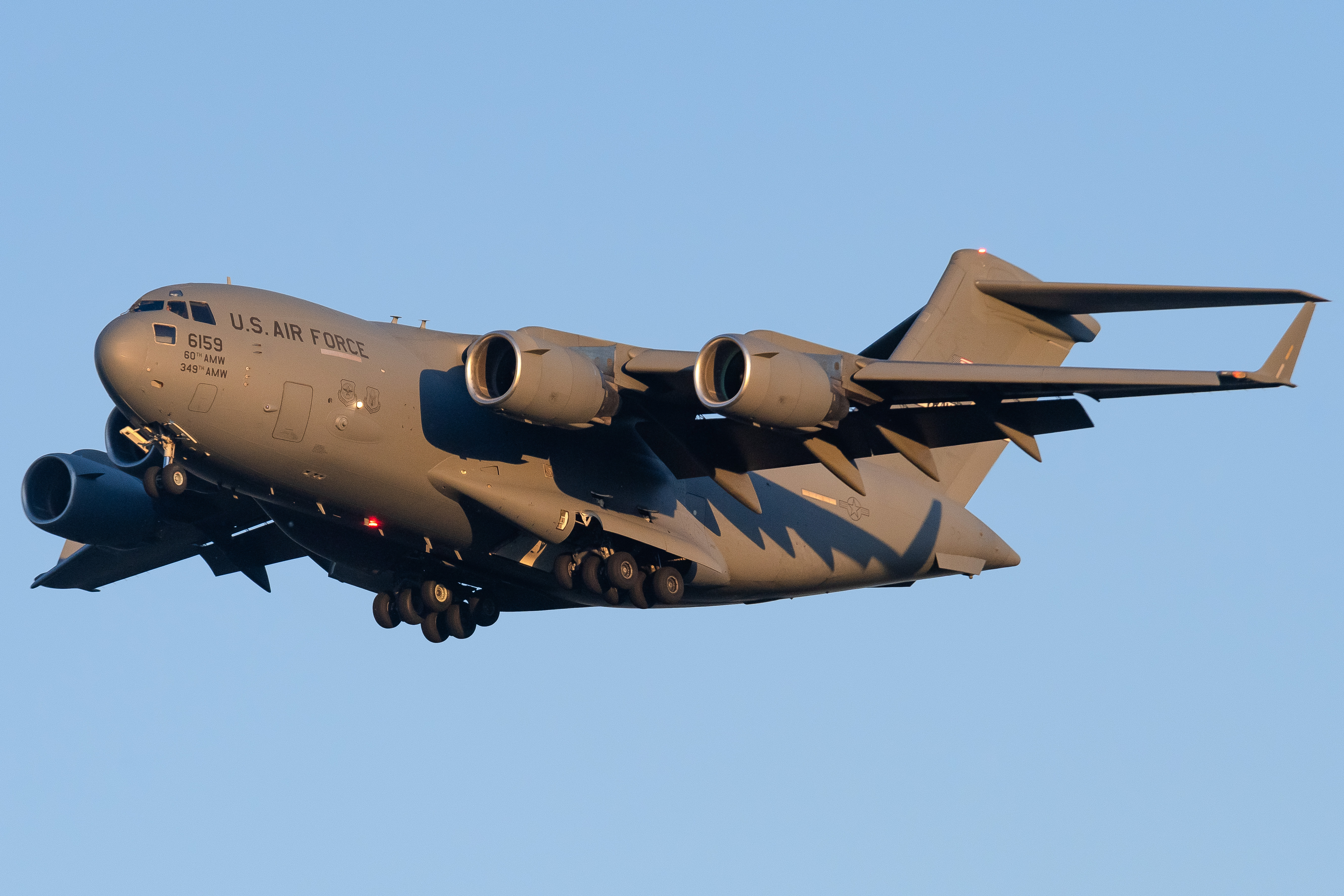
US Air Force C-17 aircraft on approach to Beijing Capital International Airport on 3 May 2026

On 3 May, the South China Morning Post reported that two US Air Force C-17 planes were spotted landing at Beijing Capital International Airport. These planes are routinely used to transport the president or vice-president's motorcade and support gear—including the "heavily armed presidential motorcade" known as "The Beast"—before overseas trips. The newspaper connected the landings to preparation for Trump's planned visit to China.

On 11 May, Chinese foreign ministry confirmed that Trump will pay a state visit to China from 12 to 15 May. The US principal deputy press secretary Anna Kelly stated that Trump will visit the Temple of Heaven and a state banquet during this visit. On 11 May, Trump announced he would have a discussion with Xi Jinping on the matter of arms sales to Taiwan, breaking with the Six Assurances. Trump posted on Truth Social and stated that he was looking forward to trip to China, which he called "an amazing country". On 13 May, the Chinese Embassy to the US posted on X stating "four red lines in China–US relations must not be challenged", namely "the Taiwan Question", "Democracy and Human Rights", "Paths and Political Systems" and "China's Development Right".

== Delegation ==
Rubio's inclusion in the US delegation drew media attention because China had sanctioned him and barred him from entering the country. According to some initial reports, this arrangement might have been made possible after China changed his name's transliteration from 卢比奥 (Lúbǐào) to 鲁比奥 (Lǔbǐào). However, The New York Times reported that this was false, noting that Xinhua News Agency had used both transliterations for about a decade. During China's Ministry of Foreign Affairs' 14 May press conference, regarding Rubio's visit to China with Trump mentioned by AFP, spokesperson Guo Jiakun responded that "the sanctions are aimed at Mr. Rubio's actions and rhetoric on China when he served as a U.S. senator". The transliteration used for the visit was also noted for containing the character 鲁 which carries the meaning "reckless", "clumsy", or "crass".

Secretary of Defense Pete Hegseth was also part of the delegation, making him the first secretary of defense to accompany the US president on a state visit to China. Other US government officials attending included Trade Representative Jamieson Greer, White House Deputy Chief of Staff for Policy Stephen Miller, Deputy Chief of Staff for Operations Beau Harrison, Deputy National Security Advisor Robert Gabriel, Director of Communications Steven Cheung, the president's Science and Tech Advisor Michael Kratsios, Speechwriting Advisor Ross Worthington, Oval Office Operations Director Walt Nauta and Chief of Protocol Monica Crowley. Secretary of Treasury Scott Bessent joined the trip after having met with Chinese vice premier He Lifeng in South Korea.

Within the Trump family, Trump's son Eric and his wife Lara also joined the visit. On 12 April, a spokesperson for The Trump Organisation told Reuters, Eric and Lara Trump "will accompany Trump in a personal capacity on the May 12 to 15 visit." Reuters reported that this may represent a conflict of interest, given that "Trump's personal wealth and business dealings are managed by Eric and other members of his family." Unlike in 2017, Trump's wife Melania did not join the trip.

On 8 May, news circulated that a delegation of American CEOs representing the business community would join Trump on his visit. The White House distributed a list of business executives who would visit with Trump on 11 May, including Elon Musk of Tesla and Tim Cook of Apple Inc. Nvidia CEO Jensen Huang, who had not initially been invited, boarded Air Force One in Alaska to accompany Trump to China.

The final list of business executives included:

- Tim Cook (Apple)
- Larry Fink (BlackRock)
- Stephen A. Schwarzman (Blackstone)
- Kelly Ortberg (Boeing)
- Brian Sikes (Cargill)
- Chuck Robbins (Cisco)
- Jane Fraser (Citigroup)
- Jim Anderson (Coherent)
- Larry Culp (General Electric)
- David Solomon (Goldman Sachs)
- Jacob Thaysen (Illumina)
- Michael Miebach (Mastercard)
- Dina Powell (Meta)
- Sanjay Mehrotra (Micron)
- Jensen Huang (Nvidia)
- Cristiano Amon (Qualcomm)
- Elon Musk (Tesla/SpaceX)
- Ryan McInerney (Visa)

Unlike the other executives, Musk and Huang directly travelled with Trump on Air Force One.

== Visit ==
=== 12–13 May ===
Trump departs the White House and heads to China on 12 May.

In the morning, Trump departed the White House and boarded Air Force One. In the evening, Air Force One made a refueling stop at Anchorage. Nvidia CEO Jensen Huang, who had not been invited initially, boarded to join the delegation.

Trump arrives in Beijing on 13 May.

In the evening in Beijing, Trump arrived at Beijing Capital International Airport, where he was greeted by Chinese vice president Han Zheng, Chinese Ambassador to the US Xie Feng, Executive Vice Foreign Minister Ma Zhaoxu, and US Ambassador to China David Perdue, as well as a military honor guard, a military band and around 300 Chinese students waving Chinese and American flags. Trump and his entourage then boarded a motorcade, which later arrived at the Four Seasons Beijing Hotel, while other members of the delegation would stay at the Kempinski Hotel Beijing Yansha Center.

=== 14 May ===
Trump participates in a greeting with Chinese leader Xi Jinping.

At 10 am, Trump arrived at the Great Hall of the People, where he was greeted by Chinese leader Xi Jinping and received an opening ceremony featuring the national anthems of the United States and China, after which they inspected troops of the People's Liberation Army and then greeted children waving Chinese and American flags. Afterwards, Trump and Xi shook hands and entered the Great Hall of the People, where they held talks. The US side of the talks included Rubio, Hegseth, Greer and Bessent, while the Chinese side included Chinese Communist Party General Office Director Cai Qi, Central Foreign Affairs Commission Office Director and Minister of Foreign Affairs Wang Yi, and Vice Premier He Lifeng.

Trump participates in a bilateral meeting with Chinese leader Xi Jinping.

During the opening remarks of the talks, Xi said that "the whole world is watching our meeting. Currently, a transformation not seen in a century is accelerating across the globe, and the international situation is fluid and turbulent". He asked whether China and the US could escape the Thucydides trap and create a "new paradigm of relations". He congratulated the US on its 250th anniversary and added that China and the US "should be partners not rivals". He said that China and the US had agreed to establish a constructive China–US relationship of strategic stability, which he said included "benign stability with competition kept within bounds, a normalized stability in which differences are kept manageable, and an enduring stability in which peace can be expected". Xi said "the Taiwan question is the most important issue in China–US relations", adding "If it is handled properly, the bilateral relationship will enjoy overall stability. Otherwise, the two countries will have clashes and even conflicts, putting the entire relationship in great jeopardy". Xi said "'Taiwan independence' and cross-Strait peace are as irreconcilable as fire and water" while adding that peace in the Taiwan Strait is the "greatest common ground between China and the United States". Trump told Xi, "You're a great leader, sometimes people don't like me saying it, but I say it anyway". He said some people called this "the biggest summit ever" and that he looks forward "very much" to the discussions. He added, "It's an honor to be with you, it's an honor to be your friend", while saying he hoped the relationship would be "better than ever before".

The two leaders then had talks behind closed doors following the opening remarks. The talks lasted two hours in total, double the duration originally scheduled. The two leaders exchanged views on the Iran war, the Russo-Ukrainian war, and the Korean Peninsula. The White House stated that the two sides had "discussed ways to enhance economic cooperation", including by US companies' access to the Chinese economy and Chinese investment in US industries. The statement also said they discussed the importance of ending the flow of fentanyl precursors into the US. Regarding the Iran war, the White House said "both countries agreed that Iran can never have a nuclear weapon" and that "the two sides agreed that the Strait of Hormuz must remain open to support the free flow of energy", while adding Xi had expressed opposition to the militarization of the Strait of Hormuz and efforts to charge a toll for its use and expressed interest in China buying oil from the US. The Financial Times later reported that Xi had condemned Japanese prime minister Sanae Takaichi for Japan's "remilitarisation", with Xi reportedly becoming "vocal and agitated when discussing Japan". Adding that this was the most intense part of Trump's visit, the Financial Times reported Trump had responded by saying Japan had to take a more assertive defense stance due to rising threats from North Korea.

Trump visits the Temple of Heaven with Chinese leader Xi Jinping.

Trump participates in a state banquet with Chinese leader Xi Jinping.

After the talks, Xi met with US business executives who joined the trip, telling them China's door would only open wider to US businesses, and that US companies were deeply involved in the Chinese economy, benefiting both sides. Afterwards, Xi and Trump visited the Temple of Heaven, which Trump called a "Great place, incredible", adding "China's beautiful". This made Trump the second US president to visit the Temple while in office, after President Gerald Ford did so in 1975. Later, Xi hosted Trump for a dinner banquet at the Golden Room of the Great Hall of the People. Xi gave a speech, where he said the "great rejuvenation of the Chinese nation" and "make America great again" can go hand in hand. He called the China–US relationship the most important in the world, adding that it concerns the well-being of the two countries of 1.7 billion population, and the interests of over 8 billion people in the world. After concluding his speech, he raised a toast to the development and future of the two countries. Afterwards, Trump gave a speech, praising the "magnificent welcome like no other" and said, "It was a great honour to be with Xi". He talked about the history of the relationship between two nations, saying "Benjamin Franklin published the sayings of Confucius in his colonial newspaper" and said a sculpture of Confucius was "carved into the face of the United States Supreme Court". He added "At the request of China's ambassador, it was president Theodore Roosevelt who provided the funds to establish Xi Jinping's alma mater, Tsinghua University". He also invited Xi and his wife, Peng Liyuan, to visit the White House on 24 September 2026.

The table arrangement and menu of the state banquet that night were circulated online afterward. Compared to Trump's last visit to China, the main table sits fewer people. The foods featured both Chinese culinary traditions and American elements. It included cold hors d'oeuvre dishes, main dishes such as golden lobster soup, crispy beef, Peking duck, salmon with mustard sauce, bean soup with fresh vegetables, and after mains including pan-fried buns with ice flowers, conch pastry, tiramisu, fruit, ice cream, coffee, tea, as well as Great Wall Chief Winemaker's Selected Cabernet Sauvignon 2009 from Hebei, China, and Changyu Reserve Chardonnay 2016 from Beijing, China. It was also rumored that the People's Liberation Army Military Band played 6 Chinese songs and 6 American songs during the state banquet. The Chinese songs included "Butterfly Lovers" and "Ru Yuan" sung by Faye Wong, while the last song played was Trump's campaign song "Y.M.C.A."

=== 15 May ===
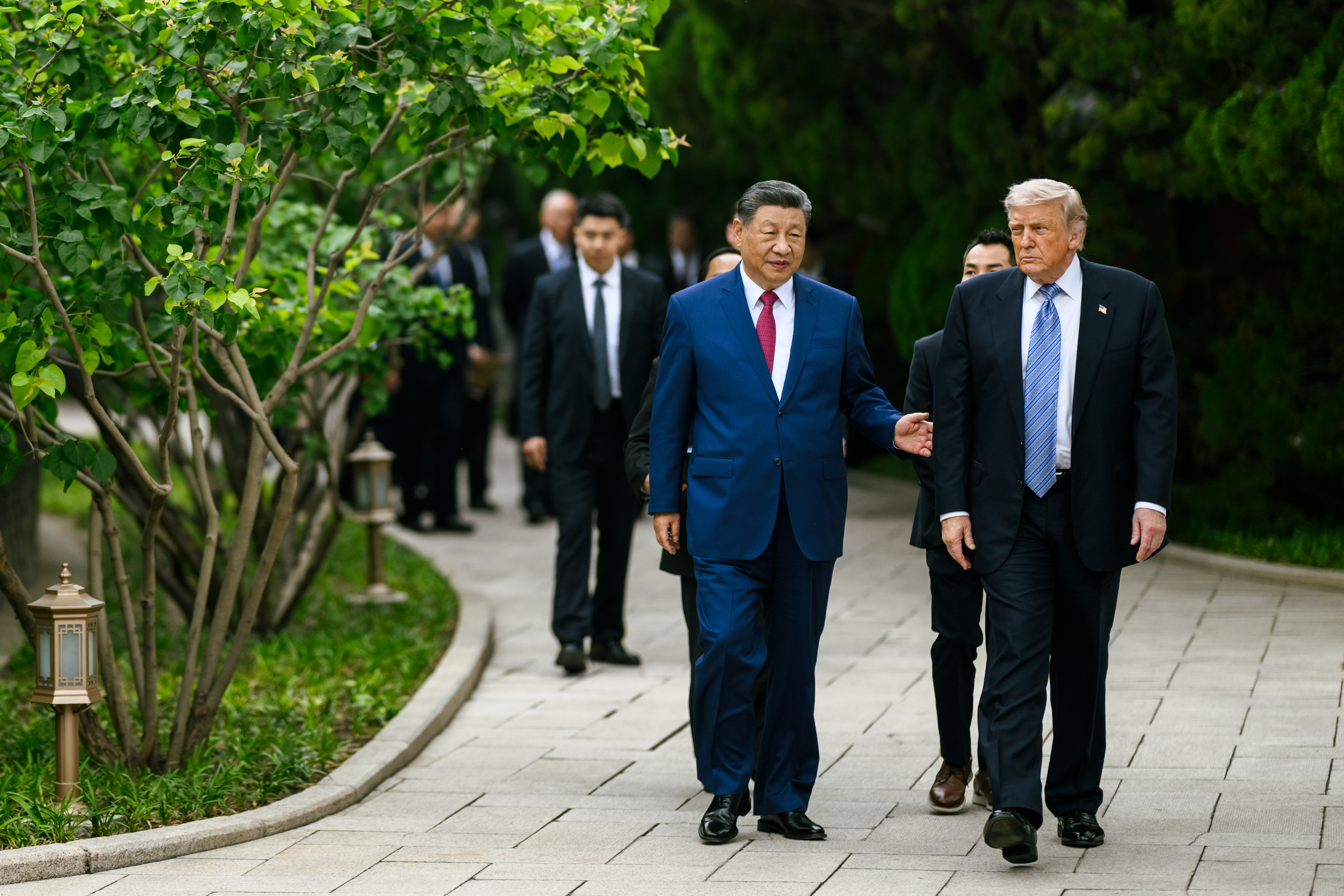
Trump and Chinese leader Xi Jinping at Zhongnanhai

Trump departs Beijing on 15 May.

On the final day of the visit, Trump and Xi walked through Jinggu garden at Zhongnanhai. When asked by Trump if he brought other dignitaries into the Zhongnanhai, Xi replied "Very few, we usually don't hold diplomatic events here. Even after we started having some, it's still extremely rare", while adding Russian president Vladimir Putin had visited several times. Xi and Trump later held talks in Chun'ouzhai pavilion. In a press briefing, Trump said they "settled a lot of different problems that other people wouldn't have been able to solve". Xi said the Zhongnanhai "is the place where leaders of the party and the central government of China work and live, including myself" and added "After the founding of the People's Republic of China in 1949, we have been here, including Chinese leaders: Mao Zedong, Zhou Enlai, Deng Xiaoping, Jiang Zemin, Hu Jintao and so on". He said "This place used to be part of the imperial garden, there is a lot of history in this compound" and noted one of the trees Xi and Trump saw in the garden was 490 years old, adding "In other places within this compound, there are trees that have lived to be over 1,000 years old". Xi also said he would send seeds of the Chinese roses he and Trump saw in the garden to Trump as a gift. After his visit to the Zhongnanhai, Trump left for Beijing Capital International Airport, where he embarked on Air Force One and left China.

White House staffers and reporters were required to surrender various items obtained in China prior to boarding Air Force One. This included burner phones used on the Chinese networks and credential badges and lapel pins issued by China. A New York Post journalist stated that "nothing from China was allowed on the plane."

== Results ==
The United States Department of Commerce gave 10 Chinese companies, including Alibaba Group, Tencent, ByteDance, and JD.com, and distributors including Lenovo and Foxconn, the permission to purchase NVIDIA's H200 chips.

Trump announced that China had agreed to order 200 airplanes from Boeing. It was China’s first order for U.S.-built aircraft since a 300-plane order during Trump's 2017 state visit to China; the industry has discussed an order of 500. After the visit, Trump had an interview with Fox News where he warned Taiwan against independence, saying "I'm not looking to have somebody go independent" and "we're not looking to have somebody say, 'Let's go independent because the United States is backing us.'"

== Analysis and reactions ==
Some experts state that the ongoing 2026 Iran war could give China greater leverage when dealing with Donald Trump, given that the U.S. had diverted resources away from South Korea and Japan to the Middle East, making them unavailable for a potential conflict over Taiwan.

In an analysis published before the summit, the Council on Foreign Relations described the meeting as an effort to stabilize China–US relations rather than resolve long-standing disputes between the two countries. The report cited continuing disagreements over China's economic policies, Taiwan, freedom of navigation in the South China Sea, and Beijing's relations with countries viewed by the United States as strategic adversaries, including Russia, Iran, and North Korea. It also highlighted China's trade with Russia during the Russo-Ukrainian war, including exports of dual-use goods and imports of Russian energy products, as a continuing source of tension between Washington and Beijing.

Chinese state media praised the trip. The Global Times wrote that "Head-of-state diplomacy plays an irreplaceable role in providing strategic guidance for China–US relations" and that "The future of China–US relations is bright". People's Daily published an editorial under the penname Guo Jiping titled "China–US Relations Cannot Go Back to the Past, But Can Have a Better Future", which said that the relationship between China and the US had become more equal. It stated that "China does not challenge or seek to replace the United States and welcomes its prosperity and development", but also that any attempts to contain China would end in failure. It also added that rather than seeing the relationship as a zero-sum game, the US should cooperate with China to solve global problems.

In Taiwan, international experts analyzed the Trump–Xi meeting and concluded that Trump maintained an ambiguous stance on Taiwan policy. However, the content of Trump's remarks revealed that while the US government uses Taiwan policy as part of its negotiating strategy, its existing "One China policy" remains unchanged.

== See also ==
- 2015 state visit by Xi Jinping to the United States
- APEC China 2026
- China–United States relations
- List of international presidential trips made by Donald Trump
- 2026 visit by Vladimir Putin to China
