= Ryan McInerney =

American business executive; CEO of Visa Inc.

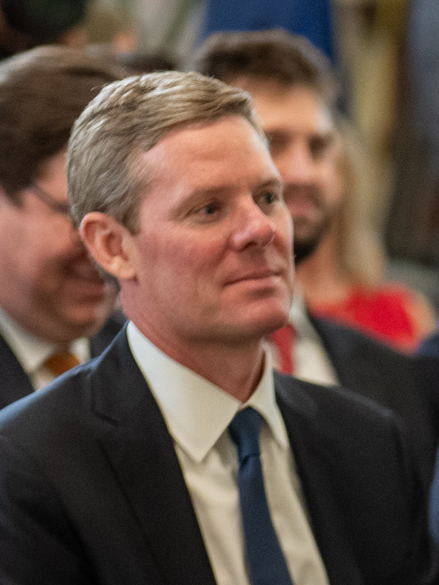
- Born: 1975 (age 50–51); Michigan, United States
- Education: University of Notre Dame (BS)
- Occupation: Business executive
- Known for: Chief Executive Officer, Director of Visa Inc.
- Spouse: Angela McInerney
- Children: 3

Ryan McInerney (born 1975) is an American business executive. Since 2023, he has been the Chief Executive Officer of Visa, Inc. He was elected to serve on the University of Notre Dame's Board of Trustees on May 31, 2024; his tenure began on July 1, 2024.

== Early life and education ==
McInerney was born and raised in Michigan in the United States. He obtained a Bachelor of Science in finance from the University of Notre Dame in 1997.

== Career ==
Ryan worked as a principal consultant at McKinsey & Company. He then joined JPMorganChase, where he helped launch the company's first mobile banking product. Eventually, he led JPMorganChase's entire consumer banking division, which put McInerney in charge of over 75,000 employees.

In 2013, McInerney was hired by Visa, where he served as Visa's global business president. McInerney, implied at his support for crypto to be a part of future payment systems in a Forbes article in November 2022. McInerney stated, "In an increasingly digital world, we want Visa to be the best way to pay and be paid for everyone everywhere." On 1 February 2023, McInerney became CEO succeeding Alfred Kelly, who had been CEO of Visa since 2016.

In February 2025, McInerney spoke at his first Visa's investor day. While speaking on Visa's financial services deal with X Corp., McInerney said in an interview. "We're not in the business of picking winners or losers," and that consumer will decide. He also said. "We set a very high bar for our partners." After Visa's investors day, McInerney appeared on CNBC's Squawk on the Street, and talked about Visa's growth and health of the consumer from the expected announcement of the Trump tariffs.

== Political activity ==
In October 2024, in a report by the Financial Times, Ryan McInerney was hosted at the Vice President Kamala Harris residence in Washington, D.C., as part of a gathering of corporate CEOs. The meeting was notable given the same week, the Biden-Harris Justice Department sued Visa for breaking antitrust laws.

As of 2026, McInerney is the chair of the US-China Business Council. In September 2026, he led a delegation of the council to visit China, where he met with Chinese Premier Li Qiang.

== Personal life ==
Ryan McInerney is married to Angela McInerney and they have three children together.

== See also ==
- List of chief executive officers
- List of University of Notre Dame alumni
