= Michael Miebach =

Chief Executive Officer - Mastercard

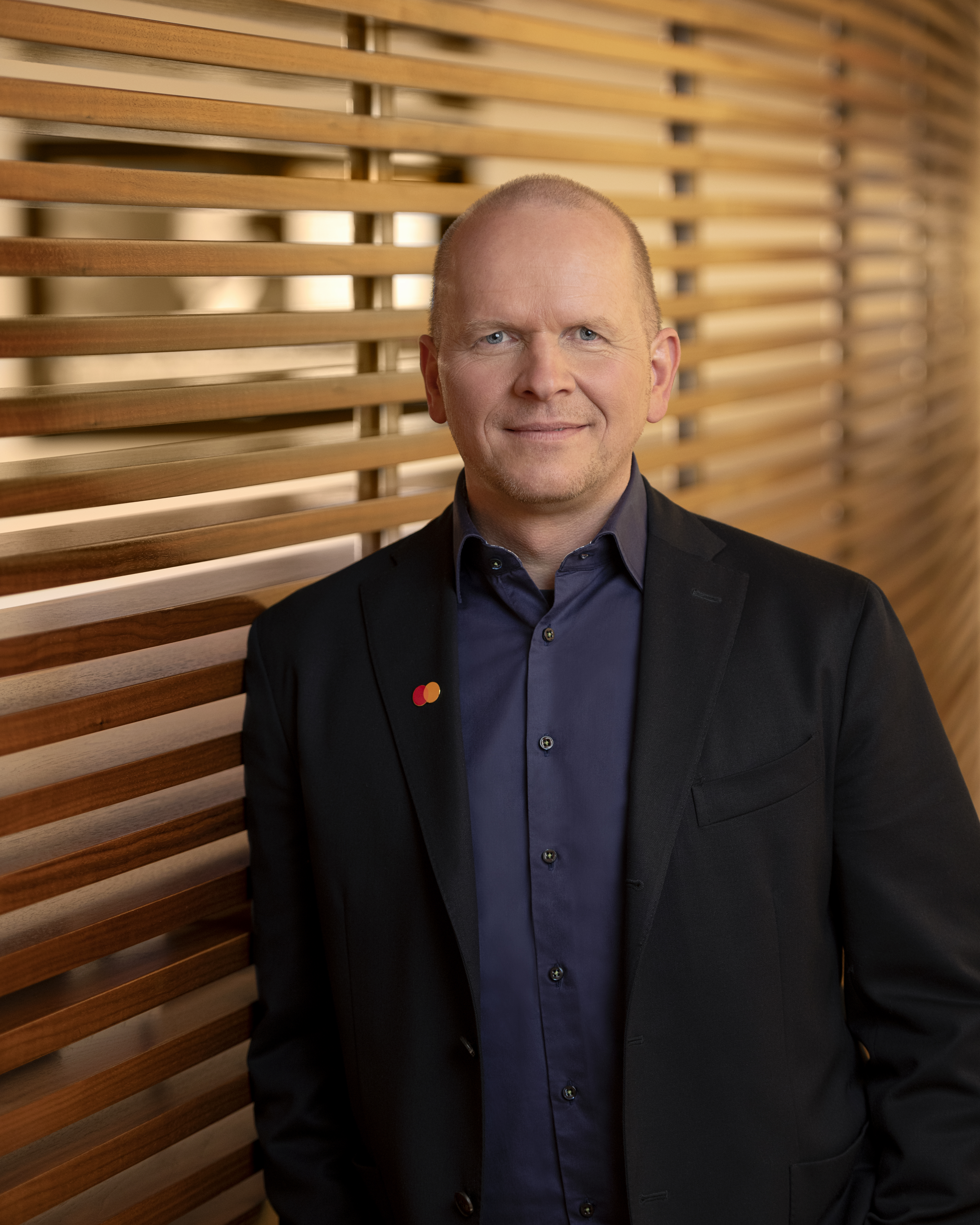
- Miebach (2018)
- Born: 1968 (age 57–58); Obergünzburg, Germany
- Education: University of Passau, Harvard Business School
- Occupation: Business executive
- Known for: CEO of Mastercard

Michael Miebach (born 1968) is a German business executive who has been Chief Executive Officer (CEO) of the US financial services provider Mastercard since January 2021. He previously held positions including Chief Product Officer and President at Mastercard and worked for Citibank and Barclays.

== Early life and education ==
Miebach was born in Obergünzburg, Allgäu, Bavaria, Germany in 1968. He studied business administration and managerial economics at the University of Passau in Germany, where he completed his Master of Business Administration.

== Career ==
After graduating, Miebach began his career at Citibank in Frankfurt, where he worked in various roles across consumer finance, corporate and investment banking, and financial control. He later joined Barclays Bank PLC as managing director for the Middle East and North Africa, with responsibility for corporate, commercial, and consumer business. Miebach sat on Barclays’ boards in Egypt, Tanzania, and Botswana. Miebach joined Mastercard as president for the Middle East and Africa region in 2010. Based in Dubai, he was responsible for expanding Mastercard's payment infrastructure and financial inclusion initiatives, particularly in regions where mobile payments were already widespread. He was promoted to chief product officer at Mastercard in 2016. In this role, he led the company’s strategy and new product development, overseeing their expansion into real-time payments, digital identity, and open banking.

He played a central role in Mastercard’s acquisition of Vocalink in 2016 and NETS' corporate services business in 2019. He also oversaw other acquisitions including Finicity and Ekata, and oversaw Mastercard Labs.

Miebach was appointed president of Mastercard in March 2020. Then, in January 2021, he succeeded Ajay Banga as chief executive officer and joined the board of directors. As of 2026, Miebach is the only German leading a major US corporation.

== Recognition and other positions ==
Miebach was appointed to the board of directors at IBM in 2023. He has served on the boards of Accion International, the World Resources Institute, Ronald McDonald House New York, and the Metropolitan Opera. He has been a member of the US-India CEO Forum, The Business Council, Business Roundtable, the International Advisory Panel of the Monetary Authority of Singapore, Fannie Mae’s digital advisory council, and the International Business Council of the World Economic Forum. In 2025, Miebach joined the Board of Governors of the American Red Cross.

Miebach was on the former United States Treasury Advisory Committee on Racial Equity.
