= 2017 state visit by Donald Trump to China =

2017 meeting between China and the United States' leaders

- Part of China–United States relations
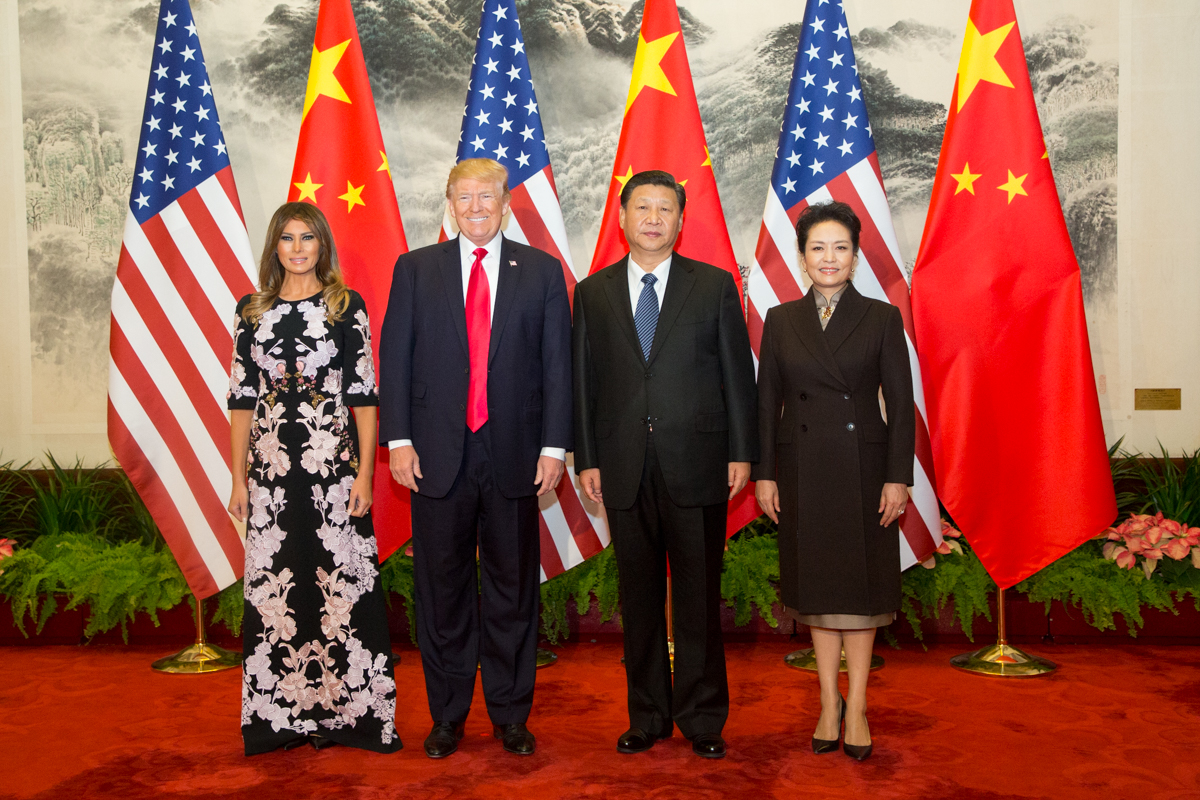
- U.S. President Donald Trump and Chinese leader Xi Jinping with their spouses in Beijing on 8 November 2017
- Date: November 8–10, 2017
- Location: Beijing
- Type: State visit
- Participants: U.S. President Donald Trump; Chinese leader Xi Jinping

From November 8 to 10, 2017, the president of the United States, Donald Trump, made a state visit to China with his wife, the first lady of the United States, Melania Trump. The visit was part of Trump's 12-day tour of Asia, which also included Japan, South Korea, Vietnam, and the Philippines. It was Trump's first state visit to China, and the only one during his first presidency.

During the visit, Trump and Chinese leader Xi Jinping discussed bilateral relations, trade, North Korea's nuclear weapons program, and efforts to combat the trafficking of opioids. The two governments also announced a series of commercial agreements involving American and Chinese companies, with a combined announced value of more than $250 billion, although some of the agreements were non-binding or represented transactions that had already been under negotiation.

== Background ==
From April 6 to 9, 2017, Chinese leader and CCP general secretary Xi Jinping visited the United States, where he was hosted by Trump at the Mar-a-Lago resort in Palm Beach, Florida for their first meeting. During the meeting, the two governments discussed trade and the threat posed by North Korea's nuclear and missile programs. The two presidents agreed to increase cooperation and established a new framework for bilateral dialogue.

Trump accepted Xi's invitation to make a state visit to China later in 2017. In September, Reuters reported that the visit was expected to take place during Trump's November Asia tour. On September 12, after meeting with U.S. Secretary of State Rex Tillerson, Chinese State Councilor Yang Jiechi announced that Trump would visit China at Xi's invitation.

The visit took place amid heightened tensions over North Korea's nuclear and ballistic missile programs and disagreements over the United States–China trade relationship. Trump had repeatedly criticized the large U.S. trade deficit with China and called for greater access for American companies to the Chinese market. At the same time, his administration was seeking Chinese cooperation in increasing economic and diplomatic pressure on North Korea.

== The visit ==
=== 8 November ===
President Donald Trump and First Lady Melania Trump arrived in Beijing on the afternoon of November 8, 2017, beginning their state visit to China. They were met at Beijing Capital International Airport by Chinese State Councilor Yang Jiechi.

The Trumps then traveled to the Forbidden City, where they met Xi Jinping and his wife, Peng Liyuan. Trump and Xi toured the complex and attended a Peking opera performance. The couples subsequently had dinner together at the Forbidden City.

The dinner at the Forbidden City was notable for its symbolism. Trump later described it as a historic occasion and said he and Melania had been honored by the reception given by Xi and Peng.

=== 9 November ===
On November 9, Xi held an official welcoming ceremony for Trump at the Great Hall of the People. The ceremony was followed by a restricted meeting and an expanded bilateral meeting between the two presidents.

North Korea was a major subject of the discussions. Trump called on China to increase pressure on North Korea and urged Beijing to reduce its economic links with Pyongyang. Trump and Xi reaffirmed their commitment to the denuclearization of the Korean Peninsula and to implementing relevant United Nations Security Council resolutions. Trump said he believed there was a solution to the North Korean nuclear issue, while emphasizing that he believed China could play an important role in resolving it.

Trade was another major issue. Trump criticized the imbalance in trade between the United States and China and called for a more reciprocal economic relationship. Xi said that China would continue opening its economy and welcomed greater participation by American companies.

Trump and Xi jointly attended the closing ceremony of the China–United States Business Leaders Dialogue. American and Chinese companies announced commercial agreements valued at more than $250 billion. The agreements covered sectors including aviation, energy, technology and agriculture. Among the announced agreements were purchases of aircraft from Boeing, energy projects in the United States, and agreements involving American agricultural products.

The value of the agreements was subsequently emphasized by the Trump administration as an economic achievement of the visit. However, contemporary reporting noted that a significant number of the agreements were non-binding or had been under negotiation before Trump's visit, making the headline value difficult to interpret as a measure of newly generated trade.

Trump also discussed the trafficking of opioids with Chinese officials. According to Secretary of State Rex Tillerson, the two sides agreed to cooperate on measures including controls on the export of fentanyl precursors, intelligence sharing and information concerning drug-trafficking networks.

Trump also held talks with Chinese Premier Li Keqiang.

While Trump participated in the official meetings, Melania Trump undertook a separate cultural and educational program. She and Peng Liyuan visited Banchang Primary School, where they attended classes and cultural activities, including Peking opera, calligraphy, cooking and architecture. Melania Trump later visited the Beijing Zoo and the Great Wall of China.

On the evening of November 9, Xi and Peng hosted a state dinner for Trump and Melania at the Great Hall of the People. The dinner included a cultural performance. In his remarks, Xi emphasized the historical development of China–United States relations and described the visit as an important event in the relationship between the two countries.

=== 10 November ===
On November 10, Melania Trump visited the panda exhibit at the Beijing Zoo and toured the Great Wall of China.

Trump's visit concluded later that day. He departed Beijing for Da Nang, Vietnam, where he attended the APEC summit.

== Issues discussed ==
=== North Korea ===
North Korea's nuclear and missile programs were among the principal security issues discussed during the visit. Trump sought greater Chinese pressure on the North Korean government, while Xi reaffirmed China's support for the denuclearization of the Korean Peninsula and implementation of United Nations sanctions against North Korea.

The discussions occurred during a period of rapidly escalating tensions surrounding North Korea's nuclear and ballistic missile tests. Trump had used increasingly severe rhetoric toward North Korea earlier in 2017 and argued that China, as North Korea's principal trading partner, had significant leverage over Pyongyang.

=== Trade and economic relations ===
Trade was a central economic issue during the visit. Trump argued that previous U.S. administrations had permitted the bilateral trade relationship to become excessively unfavorable to the United States and called for greater reciprocity and access for American businesses.

The two governments highlighted commercial agreements worth more than $250 billion. Major announced transactions included Boeing aircraft purchases, energy investments and agreements involving American agricultural products. Qualcomm also announced non-binding agreements worth approximately $12 billion with Chinese smartphone manufacturers Xiaomi, Oppo and Vivo.

Contemporary reporting questioned the extent to which the headline figure represented new business. Some agreements were non-binding, while others involved transactions that had already been under discussion before the visit.

=== Opioids ===
The two governments also discussed the trafficking of opioids, particularly substances related to fentanyl. U.S. Secretary of State Rex Tillerson said that China had agreed to cooperate on controlling the export of certain fentanyl precursors, sharing intelligence on drug trafficking and exchanging information concerning trafficking networks.

== See also ==
- 2015 state visit by Xi Jinping to the United States
- 2026 state visit by Donald Trump to China
- 2026 state visit by Xi Jinping to the United States
- China–United States relations
- List of international presidential trips made by Donald Trump
