= 2015 state visit by Xi Jinping to the United States =

2015 meeting between China and the United States' leaders

- Part of China–United States relations
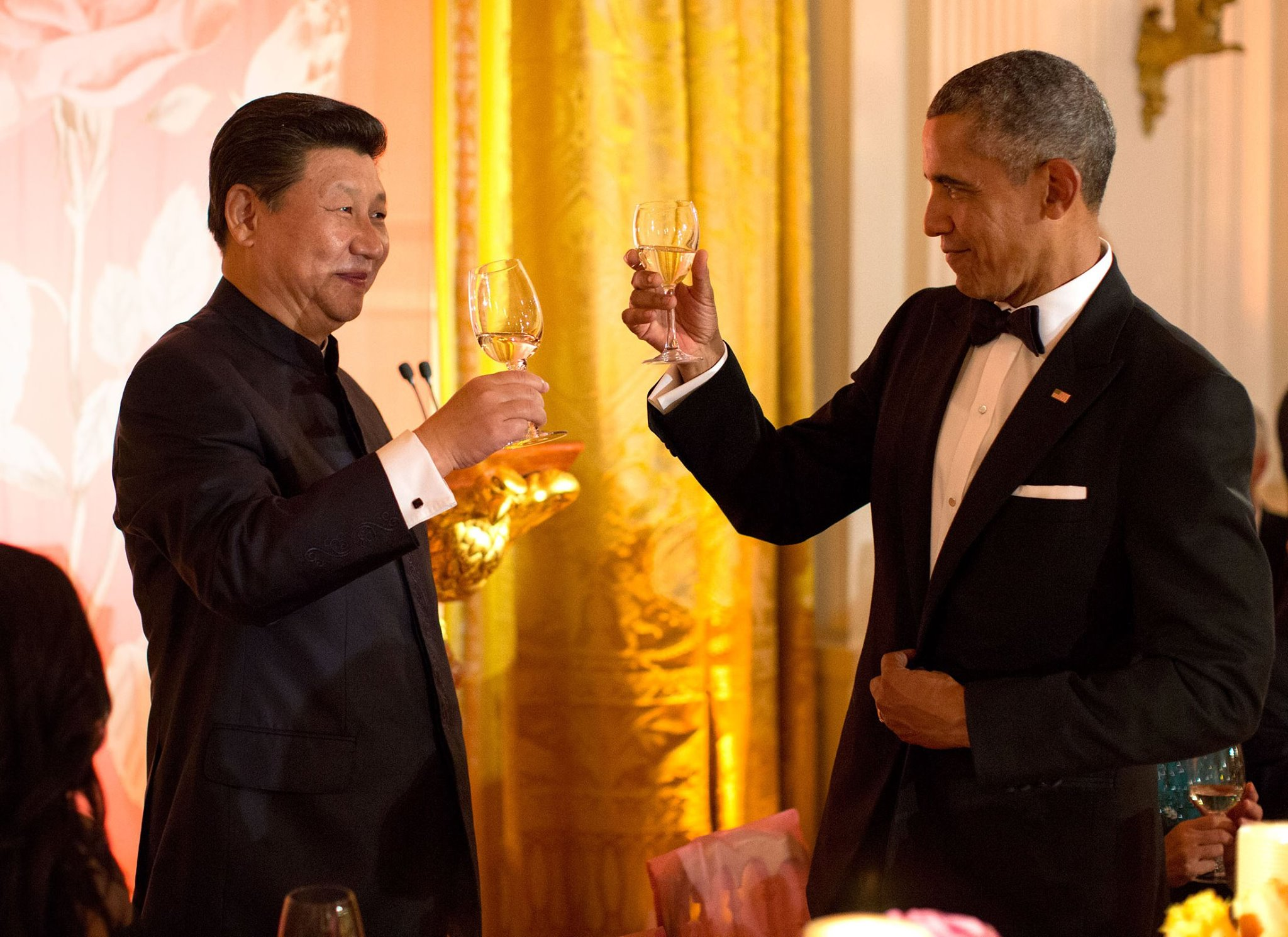
- Xi Jinping and US President Barack Obama raise a toast at a State Dinner
- Date: 22–28 September 2015
- Venue: Seattle, Washington D.C., New York City
- Participants: Xi Jinping; Barack Obama

Xi Jinping, the general secretary of the Chinese Communist Party (CCP) and president of China, paid a state visit to the United States from September 22 to 28, 2015. It was his seventh visit to the United States and his first visit after succeeding as CCP general secretary in 2012. During his visit, Xi attended the US–China Internet Industry Forum, met U.S. president Barack Obama and attended the 70th anniversary of the United Nations.

== Background ==
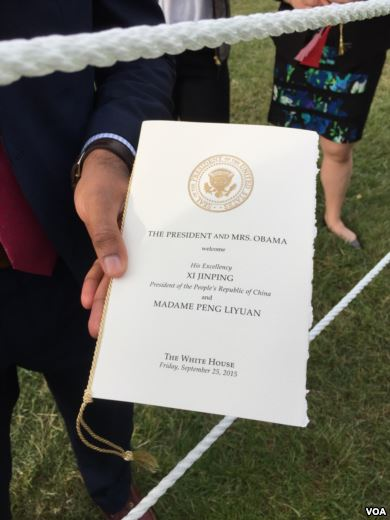
An invitation for Xi Jinping and his wife, Peng Liyuan, to visit the White House

Xi's visit occurred at a time of high tensions in the bilateral relationship. The Wall Street Journal quoted experts who said Xi's US visit was to promote domestic technology companies and to ask the US government to not retaliate in response to accusations that his country had engaged in hacking activities.

Before Xi's visit, the Congressional-Executive Commission on China held a hearing on human rights. Experts and members of Congress in attendance called on President Obama to ask Xi Jinping to stop the persecution of Tibetans, Uyghurs, religious groups, non-governmental organizations, intellectuals, democracy advocates, and supporters of "universal suffrage" in Hong Kong.

Prior to the 2015 visit, Xi had visited the United States six times. His first visit was as part of a corn industry delegation to the state of Iowa in 1985.

== Visit ==
=== September 22: Arrival at Seattle and speeches ===
On September 22, 2015, Xi Jinping and his wife, Peng Liyuan, arrived at Paine Field and stepped off an Air China aircraft at about 9:30 am (Pacific Daylight Time). Before his arrival at the Westin Seattle, protesters gathered downtown to highlight the Chinese government's human rights abuses and to voice other concerns, including Falun Gong practitioners. Supporters of Xi were also present with Chinese flags. Both protesters and supporters dispersed by the end of the night.

In the evening, Xi attended a banquet speech at the Westin Seattle Hotel where he met with Washington Governor Jay Inslee, Mayor of Seattle Ed Murray, Senator Patty Murray, Congressman Rick Larsen, and former Ambassador to China Gary Locke. In his speech, he touched on several sensitive topics, including cybersecurity, currency devaluation and his country's economy. Xi's speech cited elements of American culture, including Sleepless in Seattle and the poet Walt Whitman. He also talked about his teenage years working on a farm in Yanchuan County, Shaanxi, China, during the Cultural Revolution and linked this to the Chinese Dream. Xi reiterated that China was against currency wars and would not lower the renminbi rate to boost exports. On the topic of his anti-corruption reforms, Xi said, "It has nothing to do with a power struggle. In this case, there's no House of Cards" – a reference to the Netflix political drama, which tops the list of most illegally downloaded shows in China.

=== September 23: Visiting and meeting business executives in Seattle ===
Xi announced China will buy 300 Boeing aircraft.

On the second day of his trip, Xi visited Boeing Everett Factory and viewed the final assembly lines for the Boeing 787 Dreamliner, Boeing 777 and Boeing 747-8. Xi announced that China would buy 300 Boeing aircraft, included 250 single-aisle Boeing 737s and 50 widebody jets for US$38 billion. He also announced that Boeing would build its first non-US factory in Zhoushan, Zhejiang, China. The Chinese company Inspur and Cisco Systems said they would jointly sell networking technologies and products in China.

After his Boeing visit, Xi attended an Internet industry forum held at the headquarters of Microsoft, located in Redmond. He said China would prioritize Internet security and defended self-governance at the country level with respect to Internet regulations. Thirty US and Chinese technology executives attended this forum and posed for a photo with Xi and Chief of the State Internet Information Office Lu Wei, including Apple's CEO Tim Cook, Amazon.com's CEO Jeff Bezos, Alibaba's CEO Jack Ma, and Microsoft's CEO Satya Nadella. Before the photograph, Facebook Chief Executive Mark Zuckerberg spoke to Xi in Mandarin. On September 21, The Washington Post reported that technology executives were recommended to attend this forum, or risk their companies facing greater regulatory scrutiny in China.

After visiting Microsoft, he met with Bill and Melinda Gates as well as senior executives and board members of the company. He previewed new technologies in development by Microsoft. Nadella gifted him a 3D printed model of the Liulinhai, the first Chinese ship to dock in the United States, in Seattle, in 1979 after the establishment of diplomatic relations between the US and the People's Republic of China.

In the afternoon, Xi visited Lincoln High School in Tacoma, Washington. Lincoln's football players presented Xi with a Lincoln Abes jersey emblazoned with the number "1". Xi reciprocated with gifts of books and ping-pong equipment. He also invited 100 Lincoln High students to visit China in 2016. During this visit, the adherents of Falun Gong and Vietnamese protesters held up signs such as "Stop Red China's Violations" and shouted slogans such as "Down with Red China".

Xi attended a forum hosted by the Paulson Foundation, an economic think tank founded by Henry Paulson. He also attended a dinner organized by local Chinese groups.

=== September 24: Arrival at Washington D.C. ===
Xi and Peng left Seattle and flew to Washington, D.C., on September 24. They arrived at Joint Base Andrews and were greeted by United States Vice President Joe Biden. After the greeting, a band played the national anthems of both countries. Xi then made his way to Blair House where he and President Obama shared a private working dinner.

=== September 25: Meeting US President Barack Obama and State Dinner ===
US President Barack Obama receives Xi Jinping.

US President Barack Obama holds a joint press conference with Xi Jinping.

US Vice President Joe Biden hosts a luncheon for Xi Jinping.

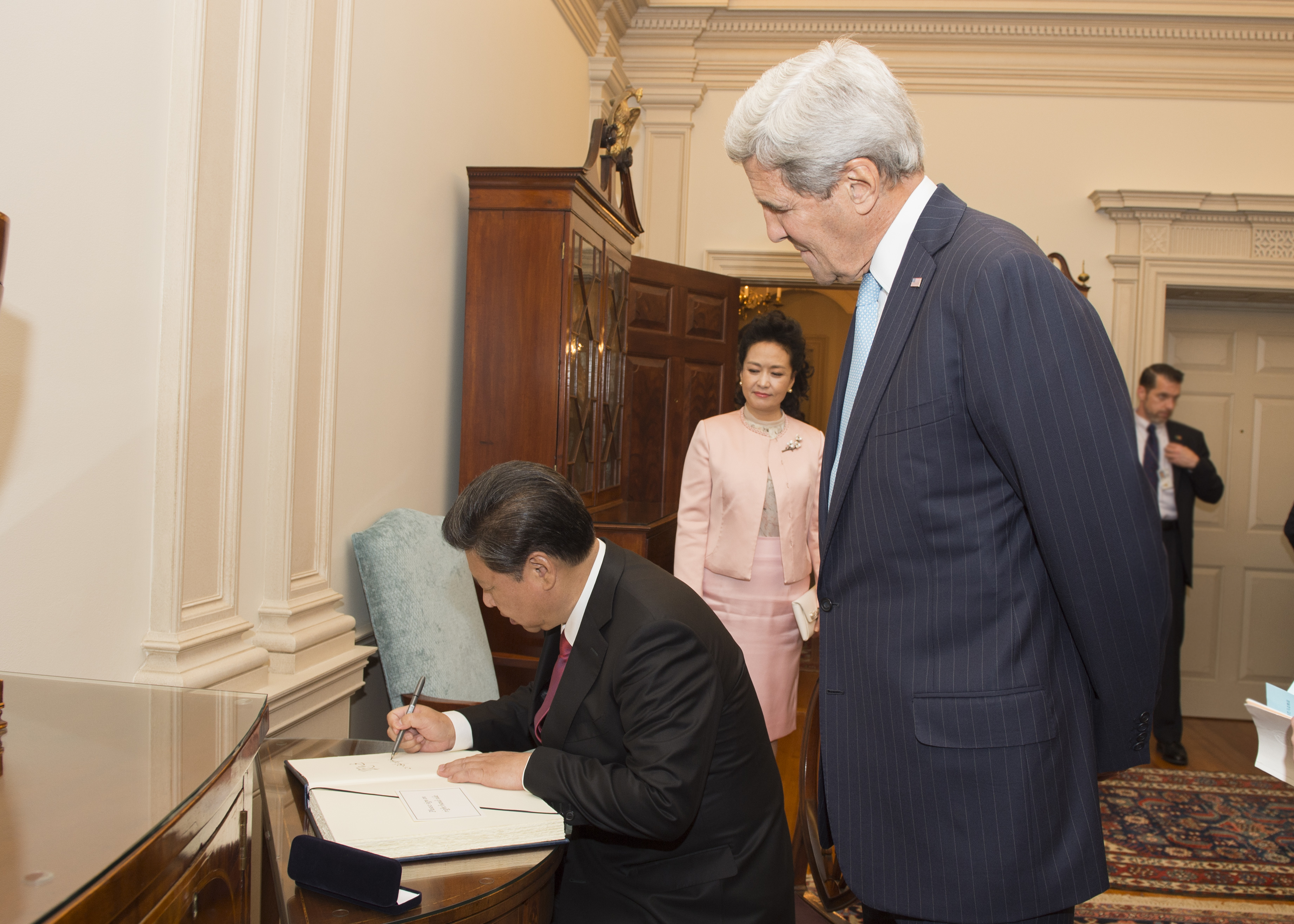
Xi Jinping signs Secretary of State John Kerry's guestbook.

US President Barack Obama and Xi Jinping at the state dinner.

On September 25, Xi arrived at the White House. President Barack Obama welcomed Xi's visit. After the welcoming ceremony, both men discussed a range of issues related to peacekeeping, nuclear security, health, environment, cybersecurity, law enforcement and counterterrorism. Xi said that China would develop a "national carbon emissions trading market" in 2017, as a part of climate change statement. Later they held a news conference at Rose Garden. Obama and Xi reached a "common understanding" that neither the United States nor China should engage in state-sponsored cyberintrusions, and they would together seek the rules for appropriate conduct in cyberspace.

In the evening, Obama held a state dinner for Xi. It was Obama's second state dinner for a Chinese president. The White House invited Anita Lo, an Asian-American chef, to serve as a guest chef and to design the menu with Chinese elements. This state dinner's guests included Mark Zuckerberg, Tim Cook and Larry Ellison, as well as former Secretary of State Madeleine Albright. Obama said “Just as you say in China that a sea accepts a hundred rivers, our countries together are stronger when we accept the diversity of the views and the contributions and uphold the rights of all our people.” Xi responded by calling for a new chapter in relations between the two nations.

=== September 26: UN Sustainable Development Summit in New York ===
On September 26, Xi flew to New York City and attended the UN Sustainable Development Summit at the headquarters of the United Nations. In his speech, he said "the world would seek an equitable, open, comprehensive and innovation-driven development path in an effort to achieve common development of all countries after 2015". He announced the establishment of a South–South cooperation assistance fund where China would contribute US$2 billion to encourage developing countries to undertake the post-2015 development agenda. In addition, Xi floated major initiatives such as the BRICS Development Bank, the Asian Infrastructure Investment Bank, and the Silk Road Fund.

=== September 27: Global Women's Summit and Environmental issues ===
On September 27, Xi and United Nations Secretary General Ban Ki-moon co-hosted the "2015 Global Women's Summit". In his speech, Xi said, "As the Chinese people pursue a happy life, all Chinese women have the opportunity to excel in life and make their dreams come true". He also announced China would contribute US$10 million to the UN Women initiative. However, former Secretary of State Hillary Clinton criticized his attendance, pointing to the state of women's rights in China.

Peng Liyuan attended UNESCO's Special Envoy for the Advancement of Girls' and Women's Education where she said her dream was for "all children especially girls can have access to good education."

Xi also attended the Leaders Working Lunch on Climate Change at the UN. He said China would control greenhouse gas emissions and put "China's South–South Cooperation Fund on Climate Change" into operation.

=== September 28: Speech at UN General Assembly ===
Xi gave a speech at the General Debate of the 70th Session of the United Nations General Assembly. He mentioned the commemoration of the 70th anniversary of Victory over Japan Day of the Second World War in China. Xi also said all economies should be built on an eco-environment, and green, low-carbon circular sustainable development platform. He also pledged US$100 million, over a period of five years, to the African Union.

== See also ==
- 2017 state visit by Donald Trump to China
- 2026 state visit by Xi Jinping to the United States
- China–United States relations
- List of international trips made by Xi Jinping
