= Georgia and the Russo-Ukrainian war =

Spillover of the Russo-Ukrainian War

The outbreak of the new escalation of the Russo-Ukrainian War and the Russian invasion of Ukraine was a significant development for Georgia. Being in the same region as both Russia and Ukraine, the war can be described as happening in Georgia's immediate neighborhood, with Georgia sharing border with both belligerents: Georgia has a 900-kilometers long direct land border with Russia and a maritime border with Ukraine. With the war waging so closely to Georgia, it has presented new challenges to the country in terms of preserving peace, security, economy and foreign policy.

Location of Georgia in relation to Ukraine.

Location of Georgia in relation to Russia.

== Response to the war ==
=== Georgian diplomatic assistance to Ukraine ===
On 1 February 2022, the Georgian parliament adopted a supportive resolution for Ukraine amid the Russian military build-up at its border, expressing concerns over the possible military escalation. During the Russian invasion of Ukraine, Georgia supported Ukraine diplomatically and politically. Irakli Garibashvili, who was the prime minister at the start of the invasion, stated that Georgia "condemns Russia's full-scale military aggression against Ukraine as a clear and blatant violation of fundamental principles and norms of the international law as well as the UN Charter".

Within the first four months following the outbreak of war, Georgia has joined more than 260 resolutions and statements condemning Russia's actions. These included the UN General Assembly resolutions condemning the Russian invasion of Ukraine, Ukraine-sponsored resolution calling Russia to withdraw its troops from Ukraine etc. Georgia was among 38 nations to initiate International Criminal Court referral in May 2022 to probe into alleged war crimes during the war, which resulted into the arrest warrant for Russian President Vladimir Putin.

In April 2022, the Georgian parliament speaker Shalva Papuashvili visited the Ukrainian towns of Bucha and Irpin following the Bucha massacre to express support and meet the Ukrainian parliament speaker Ruslan Stefanchuk.

=== Georgian humanitarian assistance to Ukraine ===
On 26 February 2022, the Georgian Prime Minister Irakli Garibashvili signed a decree to allocate 1 million GEL from the Georgian government's reserve fund for the purpose of purchasing and sending medical supplies to Ukraine. On 28 February, the Georgian Economy Ministry and its Enterprise Georgia agency launched a campaign to deliver various products to Ukrainians in need of assistance. In April 2022, the Ukraine's National Post reported that Georgia ranked on the first place with its supplies of humanitarian aid to Ukraine by mail as of 1 April.

In addition, Georgian Prime Minister Irakli Garibashvili took part in the International Donors' Conference for Ukraine in May 2022 to vow "continued support", while the next Georgian Prime Minister Irakli Kobakhidze attended the Ukraine Recovery Conference in June 2024.

== Troops from South Ossetia and Abkhazia in Ukraine ==
Leaders of Abkhazia and South Ossetia, Russian-backed separatist republics of Georgia, announced their support for Russian Federation in the Russian invasion of Ukraine. On 26 March 2022, President of South Ossetia Anatoly Bibilov announced that South Ossetian troops would take part in the Russian invasion of Ukraine. Based on the 2017 military treaty between Russia and South Ossetia, parts of South Ossetian Armed Forces were integrated into the Russia's 4th Guards Military Base stationed in the territory. According to the General Staff of the Armed Forces of Ukraine, three battalion tactical groups of around 1200 Russian and South Ossetian servicemen were transferred to Ukraine. Moreover, South Ossetian volunteers took part in the invasion within the Russian irregular units in Ukraine, such as Alania Battalion, which has been described by the Institute for the Study of War as the “first volunteer unit to have seen combat during the Russian invasion of Ukraine”.

In addition, parts of Russian military units stationed in Abkhazia were also transferred to Ukraine. According to the General Staff of the Armed Forces of Ukraine, two battalion tactical groups, with about 800 soldiers, were transferred from Russia's 7th Military Base in Abkhazia to Ukraine as of March 2022. Abkhazian Armed Forces officially did not take part in the invasion. However, Abkhaz volunteers fought on Russian side within units such as Pyatnashka Brigade. As the most Abkhaz and South Ossetian citizens at the same time also hold Russian citizenship, the prospect of the Russian mobilization in Abkhazia and South Ossetia has been raised, although, the mobilization so far has only encompassed "Russian citizens registered in the officially recognized territory of the Russian Federation".

== Georgian volunteers in Ukraine ==
The Georgian Legion, a unit of Georgian and international volunteers in the War in Donbas, took part in the Russian invasion of Ukraine on Ukraine's side. The group is commanded by Mamuka Mamulashvili, a veteran Georgian officer. As of February 2024, 44 Georgian Legion volunteers have so far been reported killed in the Russian invasion of Ukraine.

== Ukrainian refugees in Georgia ==
In overall, 245,000 refugees from Ukraine have crossed into Georgia since February 2022, primarily from the heavily war-affected areas in the Eastern Ukraine. Out of this, 26,600 stayed in Georgia as of February 2024. In March 2022, the Georgian government responded by providing temporary accommodation and access to healthcare and education. The Tbilisi City Hall allocated accommodation in hotels and food for Ukrainian citizens for four months, after which the financial assistance programme was launched by the Georgian authorities in August 2022. The Ukrainian refugees in Georgia also enjoy free public transport, sports and entertainment centers, kindergartens, and other services. The United Nations Refugee Agency also launched its own financial aid programme to Ukrainian refugees.

== New Russian naval base in Abkhazia ==
In January 2024, Russia signed an agreement with Abkhazia to host the Ochamchire Russian naval base. If the base is built, it would be a vital refueling port facility for the Russian Navy. According to the Abkhaz President Aslan Bzhania, the agreement intends to increase military cooperation between Abkhazia and Russia. On the other hand, the UK Ministry of Defence noted that Russia was moving its Black Sea Fleet activities eastward in face of Ukrainian attacks on the Russian naval assets in Crimea, with Russia already relocating at least 17 vessels from Sevastopol to Novorossiysk. With this in mind, the new naval base might potentially raise the prospect of Russia-Ukraine warfare expanding to Georgia's breakaway territory.

While there already is a port in Ochamchire under Russian control since Russia has signed border protection agreement with Abkhazia in 2009, its current infrastructure is not sufficient to receive large ships. Despite Ochamchire's limited capabilities, establishing it as a new navy sanctuary for Russia would significantly bolster Russia's posture in the region. The port might also provide Russia a leverage on the Georgia's planned deepwater port in neighboring Anaklia town and planned commercial activities tied to it.

== Georgia–Ukraine crisis ==
Georgia–Ukraine relations were already strained before the Russian invasion of Ukraine, with the primary cause stemming from the Georgian ex-President Mikheil Saakashvili being granted Ukrainian citizenship in 2015 and being placed in various Ukrainian governmental positions, while the Georgian government sought his extradition and prosecution for abuse of power, embezzlement, and his implication in the attempted murder of an opposition MP, with Ukraine rejecting the extradition request. In October 2021, Mikheil Saakashvili clandestinely returned to Georgia from Ukraine and called his followers to march on the Georgian capital, with his location being initially unknown to the public, however, later his whereabouts were revealed by the police and he was arrested in the Georgian city of Tbilisi. With the Ukrainian President Volodymyr Zelenskyy saying that he would use "various means" get Saakashvili back to Ukraine, the relations between the countries became even more strained and the dysfunctional relationship continued after the start of the 2022 Russian invasion of Ukraine.

During the invasion, Georgia announced that it would support Ukraine diplomatically and politically. However, It also announced that it would not send military equipment to Ukraine and would not join Western economic sanctions on Russia. Nikoloz Samkharadze, Chair of the Foreign Relations Committee of Georgian Parliament, argued that Georgia is restricted to do more by the presence of Russian occupational troops on its territory, not far from the Georgian capital of Tbilisi, and that Georgia is "punching above its weight" by supporting Ukraine in political, humanitarian and diplomatic dimensions. This left Ukrainian officials dissatisfied with Georgia's position and Kyiv has responded by recalling and later dismissing its ambassador to Georgia.

=== Second Front controversy ===
Shortly after the start of the Russian invasion of Ukraine in 2022, the Secretary of the Ukrainian National Security Council Oleksiy Danilov called Georgia to open a "second front" against Russia, adding that it would have “definitely helped us”. He said that Georgia was not "doing a right thing" by not opening a second front. Additionally, Oleksiy Arestovych, advisor to Ukrainian President Volodymyr Zelenskyy, stated that it was a "historic opportunity to retake Abkhazia and South Ossetia".

Georgian official Irakli Kobakhidze criticized these remarks, saying that opening a second front would indeed "make the situation worse for Russia", but it would also come at the cost of "destroying Georgia" as Russia's military is significantly stronger than the Georgian military, with Georgia being much smaller country. He also stated that the Ukrainian officials wanted to pursue their own interests at Georgia's expense. Georgian MP Gia Volski called on the EU and US to "distance themselves" from statements from some Ukrainian officials to "see Georgia engage in war". As a result of controversy, the relations between Georgia and Ukraine became strained.

== See also ==
- Belarus and the Russian invasion of Ukraine
- Moldova and the Russian invasion of Ukraine
- Lithuania and the Russian invasion of Ukraine
- Iran and the Russian invasion of Ukraine
- China and the Russian invasion of Ukraine
- Taiwan and the Russian invasion of Ukraine
- Hungary and the Russian invasion of Ukraine
