= Hong Kong and the Russian invasion of Ukraine =

Reaction and response of Hong Kong to the Russian invasion of Ukraine

Since the Russian invasion of Ukraine in February 2022, it has created much debate within the population of Hong Kong. There were many associations between the war and the 2019 Hong Kong protests three years before, mainly from the pro-democracy camp.

== Comparisons of Ukraine with Hong Kong ==
On February 26, 2022, the US ambassador to Japan Rahm Emanuel compared Russia's actions towards Ukraine to China's actions towards Hong Kong. He described how both nations openly disregard agreements so that democratic voices may be silenced, mentioning the Sino-British Joint Declaration for Hong Kong and the Minsk agreements for Ukraine.

Pro-Beijing commentator Lau Siu-kai rejected this comparison, claiming that it is an inappropriate comparison to draw.

== Reaction of netizens ==
=== Pro-Ukrainian voices ===
Many of the netizens in the city voiced support for the people of Ukraine, with some even advocating for joining the Ukrainian International Legion in their fight against Russia.

In addition, Simon Shen, a Hong Kong political scientist, also encouraged Hong Kongers to be more attentive to the news about the war in Ukraine. He also made comparisons between the destruction of territorial integrity in Ukraine to the tearing apart of the agreements in the Sino-British Joint Declaration. Many netizens also encouraged their followers to closely watch events regarding Ukraine, and also to donate when possible to help the Ukrainian people defend against Russian aggression.

=== Pro-Russian views of Chinese netizens ===
Former CPPCC member Lew Mon-hung posted on Facebook criticising Chinese netizens for cheering on the Russian invasion of Ukraine, claiming they were like supporting the thievish actions of a tiger.

There were posts from Chinese netizens praising Russians as "brothers" of China, and a columnist reprimanded them by bringing up Russia's role in the Eight-Nation Alliance in suppressing the power of Qing China. Chinese netizens also posted support for Putin, seeing any anti-Western sentiment as "patriotic", which Political scientist Simon Shen accused of being a false dilemma.

== Reaction of politicians ==
=== Pro-democracy camp ===
In 2020, many local politicians in the pro-democracy camp were forced to flee into exile, among which are Ted Hui, Baggio Leung, and Nathan Law. With the outbreak of the Russian invasion in February 2022, both Hui and Leung posted on Facebook voicing support for Ukraine. Leung wished peace and victory for the Ukrainian fighters, while Hui posted images of himself attending a pro-Ukrainian rally in Adelaide. Law made a post satirising China's role in the war, claiming that the country aims to "antagonise the international community" and be "cut off from the world economy", and are trying to get rid of the rapidly devaluing Russian ruble from their currency reserves.

On March 6, 2022, two representatives from the League of Social Democrats organised a protest outside the Russian consulate in the city, demanding a withdrawal of troops from Ukrainian territory. They also demanded that the Chinese government pressure Russia to end the war. The protest was monitored by a dozen police officers, leading to questions about the need for such law enforcement measures.

=== Pro-Beijing camp ===
In early February 2022, before the Russian invasion, a lawmaker from the pro-Beijing New People's Party posted an edited image of Mr. Bean on social media. He claimed that anyone who believed in Western propaganda and were awaiting the Russian invasion could only wait idly, implying talks about a Russian invasion were nothing but Western propaganda. Once the Russian invasion actually happened, he then deleted his post, but did not give an explanation or an apology. City newspaper Ming Pao also tried to contact him, but did not get a response.

== Positions of mass media ==
In a report in early March 2022, TVB News claimed that "there were commentaries" that the war in Ukraine began due to Ukrainian president Volodymyr Zelenskyy advocating for NATO membership, which provoked Russia into invading.

In an article from Wen Wei Po, the newspaper repeated Russian propaganda by claiming the goals of the war to be the "demilitarisation and denazification" of Ukraine. They also noted the participation of Ukrainian Azov Brigade members in the 2019 Hong Kong protests.

On May 27, 2022, Oriental Daily News published false news, claiming that Poland wanted to use the Russian invasion to "annex Ukrainian territory". This was met with fierce criticism form Polish authorities in the city, with the Polish consulate in Hong Kong calling on the city's residents to not fall into Russia's disinformation. The consulate also mentioned Poland's own history of being annexed, referring to the Partition of Poland, and will therefore never recognise territorial changes based on invasion and other illegal means.

== Other reactions ==
Sports commentator Vincent Ng posted on social media, claiming that upon hearing about a friend from Ukraine needing to leave to protect his homeland, he became filled with tears, and wished his friend peace and blessings.

Raymond Yeung, the founder of bookshop Hillway Culture, began selling photograph books of Ukraine after the invasion began. He also promised that all profits would be donated to humanitarian organisations to help ease the humanitarian crisis in Ukraine.

=== Posts about Russo-Ukrainian divorced couple ===
Following the Russian invasion in February 2022, local radio personality Candy Chea and blogger Bonnie Chu both forwarded a post that compared the Russo-Ukrainian relationship to a divorced couple. In it, the post claimed that the invasion was like "protecting the couple's two children" (referring to Donbas and Crimea. Due to the post's pro-Russian viewpoint, the two influencers received much criticism online.

Chea later on deleted and apologised for her post, and wished for world peace. However, her original post continued to circulate online, and some criticised that Chea deleted some comments to the original post that were critical of herself. Chu on the other hand refused to delete or apologise, claiming the post was of a "satirical nature" for explanation purposes only. She also criticised some netizens who assumed a pro-Russian stance onto her because of the post.

On April 8, 2022, Taipei legislator Liang Wenjie reposted an image post from the "Free Hong Kong Centre", where a Ukrainian soldier thanked the people of Hong Kong and Taiwan for their support. However, Liang then questioned the reason for thanking the Hong Kong people in the repost, claiming that "thanking Hong Kong is very weird". This repost received criticism from Hong Kong netizens, with many reiterating that Hong Kong people are subject to speech censorship, and that many continued to donate to Ukraine despite this limitation. Liang then updated his post, acknowledging the difference in position between the government and the people of Hong Kong, and apologised to "pro-democracy friends in Hong Kong" for his earlier comments.

== See also ==
- China and the Russo-Ukrainian war
- Taiwan and the Russian invasion of Ukraine
