= Moldova and the Russo-Ukrainian war =

Spillover of the Russo-Ukrainian War

Following the Russian invasion of Ukraine, Moldova accepted Ukrainian refugees, opened a bank account for donations, and unofficially imposed sanctions on Russia.

Moldova also declared a 60-day state of emergency and fully closed its airspace for a week.

Although the war has spilled over into Moldova on multiple occasions, it is not a belligerent and is officially neutral.

Some believe Russia wants to create a land corridor to Transnistria, or bring Transnistria into the war completely.

== Background ==
=== Transnistria conflict ===
On 31 August 1989, the Supreme Soviet of the Moldavian SSR enacted two laws. One of them made Moldovan the official language, in lieu of Russian, the de facto official language of the Soviet Union. It also mentioned a linguistic Moldo–Romanian identity. The second law stipulated the return to the Latin Romanian alphabet. Moldovan language is the term used in the former Soviet Union for a virtually identical dialect of the Romanian language during 1940–1989. On 27 April 1990, the Supreme Soviet of the Moldavian SSR adopted the traditional tricolour (blue, yellow and red) flag with the Moldavian coat of arms and later changed in 1991 the national anthem to Deșteaptă-te, române!, the national anthem of Romania since 1990. Later in 1990, the words Soviet and Socialist were dropped and the name of the country was changed to "Republic of Moldova".

These events, including the end of the Ceaușescu regime in neighboring Romania in December 1989 and the partial opening of the border between Romania and Moldova on 6 May 1990, led many in Transnistria and Moldova to believe that a union between Moldova and Romania was inevitable. This possibility caused fears among the Russian-speaking population that it would be excluded from most aspects of public life. From September 1989, there were strong scenes of protests in the region against the central government's ethnic policies. The protests developed into the formation of secessionist movements in Gagauzia and Transnistria, which initially sought autonomy within the Moldavian SSR, in order to retain Russian and Gagauz as official languages. As the nationalist-dominated Moldavian Supreme Soviet outlawed these initiatives, the Gagauz Republic and Transnistria declared independence from Moldova and announced their application to be reattached to the Soviet Union as independent federal republics.

== 2014 outbreak of the war ==
Following the 2014 Russian annexation of Crimea and the outbreak of the Russo-Ukrainian War, Moldova was forced to think about the threats to its country. The 2014 Crimean status referendum inspired a similar referendum in Gagauzia, where the majority of residents favored independence and joining the EAEU.

On 6 March 2014, during an emergency EU meeting, Lithuanian President Dalia Grybauskaite said that, "Russia is trying to redraw the borders of states. First Ukraine, then Moldova, and in the end, the Baltic states and Poland."

On 23 March 2014, Supreme Allied Commander Europe Philip M. Breedlove said that Russian forces in Crimea were so numerous and prepared that if they were ordered to advance to Transnistria, it would pose a threat to Moldova.

The annexation of Crimea by Russia on 18 March 2014 was enthusiastically received in Transnistria. According to a report by freelancer journalist Mitra Nazar from March 2014, people in Transnistria saw this event as a "sign of hope" and as an opportunity for Russia to annex Transnistria as well. Such feelings were also present among Transnistrian officials. On the same day of the annexation, the then Speaker of the Supreme Council of Transnistria Mikhail Burla sent a letter to the then Chairman of the State Duma of Russia Sergey Naryshkin asking for legislative reforms to facilitate a Russian annexation of Transnistria in the future. Posteriorly, the then Minister of Foreign Affairs of Transnistria Nina Shtanski requested the President of Russia Vladimir Putin to annex Transnistria. She also approved the Russian annexation of Crimea.

Speculation regarding whether Transnistria would also be annexed by Russia or not also arose outside Transnistria, with the then President of Moldova Nicolae Timofti asking Russia not to attempt to annex Transnistria. In Ukraine, the role of Transnistria in all of this situation was also discussed. In March 2014, the Ukrainian diplomat Yevhen Perebyinis claimed that Transnistria was gathering a group of activists and representatives of Cossack associations to be sent to Odesa under the premise of being local civilians to destabilize the situation there. In the same month, the Ukrainian military expert and blogger Dmytro Tymchuk considered it possible that, after the occupation of Crimea, Russia could try to invade Kherson and Odesa and establish a land connection to Transnistria.

In early April 2014, the war in Donbas started and the pro-Russian separatist republics of Donetsk and Luhansk were declared. On 10 July 2014, Vladimir Antyufeyev, who was the Minister of State Security of Transnistria from 1992 to 2012, was made Deputy Minister of State Security of the Donetsk People's Republic.

In July 2014, faced with concerns that Transnistria could be used by Russia to attack Ukraine, the latter country started digging a trench 450 kilometres (280 miles) long, 3.5 metres (11 feet) wide and 2–3 m (6 ft 7 in – 9 ft 10 in) deep on the border between Transnistria and Ukraine to prevent a possible movement of heavy artillery from the unrecognized republic to Ukraine. Such statement was made by the Speaker of the Southern Regional Department of the State Border Guard Service of Ukraine Oleksandr Yakovenko. At this time there was still fear of a possible Russian attack on Ukraine from Transnistria, as shown by a 28 July 2014 declaration by Oleksandr Danylyuk, then assessor to the Ministry of Defence of Ukraine, who pointed out this possibility. Such measures continued up to March 2015, when the State Border Guard Service mobilized some 3,000 new soldiers to defend the Odesa Oblast, most of whom were to stay on the border with Transnistria. In this year the idea that Russia would be connected to Transnistria through an invasion of Ukraine was still present, as Romanian-born German writer and Nobel Prize in Literature recipient Herta Müller warned.

== Response to the 2022 invasion ==
President of Moldova Maia Sandu has declared that she condemns the aggression of Russia against Ukraine in the strongest terms. Moldova signed a UN Resolution condemning Russia's aggression against Ukraine.

On 3 March 2022, Moldova followed Ukraine and applied for EU membership. On March 8, Moldovan Prime Minister Natalia Gavrilița said that Moldova wants to join the EU, but not NATO.

On 15 March 2022, the Parliamentary Assembly of the Council of Europe adopted a resolution to exclude Russia from the organization, in which Transnistria was called a "zone of Russian occupation."

Following the Bucha massacre, Moldovan authorities declared 4 April a day of mourning.

On 14 April 2022, the Moldovan parliament banned the Ribbon of St. George and the symbols V and Z "in the context of Russia's military aggression against Ukraine."

On 16 December 2022, Moldova banned six pro-Russian TV channels. Moldovan authorities stated that the decision was made "in order to protect the information space and prevent the risk of disinformation."

== Spillover ==
=== Airspace ===
Nicu Popescu, the Minister of Foreign Affairs and European Integration of Moldova, announced that three Russian missiles launched on 10 October 2022 from the Black Sea aimed at Ukraine crossed through Moldova's airspace. He condemned this event in the "strongest possible terms" and called it a breach of international law. Popescu also added that the Russian ambassador to Moldova, Oleg Vasnetsov, had been summoned to provide explanations.

Moldova also says that its airspace was crossed once more during the 14 January 2023 attacks.

On 10 February 2023, Moldova reported that its airspace had again been violated by a Russian missile.

On 14 February 2023, a day after the coup plot allegations were made public, Moldova briefly closed its airspace after a small object resembling a weather balloon was detected in its airspace over the north of the country, near the Moldovan-Ukrainian border. Its airspace was re-opened after authorities ascertained the object posed no safety risk to civilians. The incident transpired against the backdrop of other aerial events that month.

=== Missile and drone incidents ===
On 31 October 2022, a Russian missile, shot down by Ukrainian air defence systems, crashed into Naslavcea, a village in Moldova. No casualties were reported but windows of several residential houses were shattered. Moldovan authorities strongly condemned the renewed wave of attacks.

On 5 December 2022, a missile once again fell into Moldovan territory. The Ministry of Internal Affairs of Moldova announced that it was found by the Moldovan Border Police in an orchard close to the city of Briceni. Due to this, patrolling intensified and the alert level was raised in the areas of Briceni and Ocnița. Russian military expert Alexei Leonkov said that this event was similar to the one that had occurred in Poland previously and that in both cases it was a missile originating from a S-300 missile system.

On 14 January 2023, Moldovan border police found missile debris in Larga, Briceni District. Specialists carried out "controlled detonations" of the debris.

On 16 February 2023, Moldovan police found missile debris in Larga once again. This was the fourth time a missile or its debris hit Moldova.

On 25 September 2023, a missile crashed into Chițcani, for the first time in Moldovan territory controlled by Transnistria.

On 11 February 2024, fragments of a Russian drone were found in the village of Etulia. It was suspected to have crashed in Moldova after being shut down by Ukrainian air defense forces. A Russian attack with drones against Ukraine's Izmail Raion had taken place earlier on the night of 9 to 10 February. On 17 February, fragments of a Russian drone were again found in Etulia Nouă. This happened again on 4 April, when the wreckage of a Russian drone was found again near Etulia following a Russian attack against Ukraine with drones the previous night.

=== Energy ===
In 2022, Moldova suffered its worst energy crisis since its independence. In early October, Ukraine ceased its electricity exports to Moldova following the destruction of part of Ukraine's electricity system as a result of a mass bombing campaign of Ukrainian civilian and energy infrastructure by Russia. On 24 October, this provoked an electricity deficit in the country. Parts of Moldova were in blackouts, for short periods, due to Russian shelling of Ukrainian energy infrastructure. Moldova began importing electricity from Romania.

=== Transnistria attacks ===
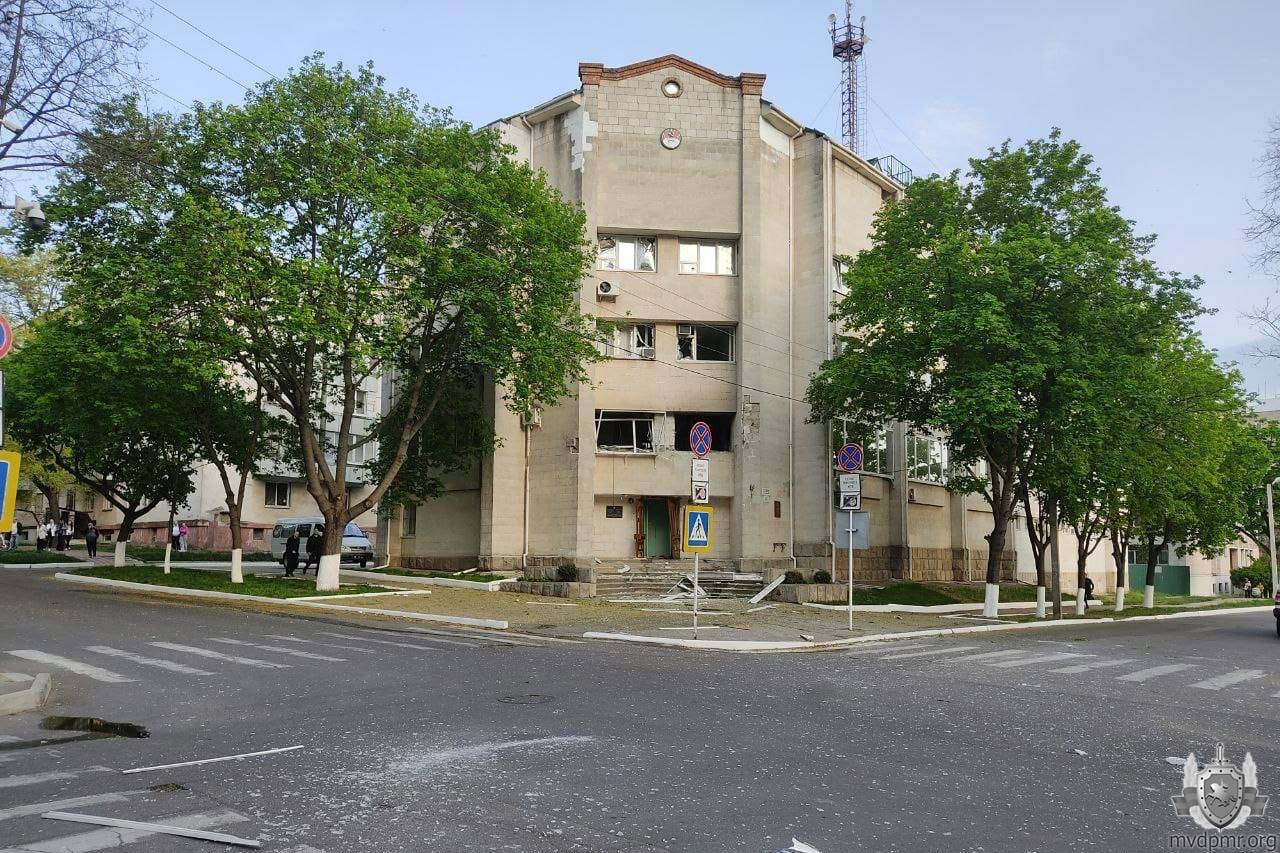
Front of the damaged building of the Ministry of State Security

On 25 April, 2022, explosions hit the headquarters of Transnistria's Ministry of State Security in Tiraspol, the republic's capital, at 15:00 GMT. At 23:30, the Tiraspol Airport was attacked from the air, possibly having been from a drone strike; two explosives had been dropped on the air base of the airport. The windows and hood of a ZIL-131 truck were damaged.

On 26 April, 2022, two explosions in the Grigoriopol transmitter were reported in Maiac, the first one at 06:40 and the second at 07:05, knocking out two radio antennas that broadcast Russian radio stations.

On 27 April, 2022, the Ministry of Internal Affairs of Transnistria reported that several drones flew over Cobasna, which is only around two kilometres (1 1/4 mi) away from the border with Ukraine, and that shots were fired at the village. The ministry claimed that the drones came from Ukraine.

On 6 May, 2022, at 9:40, there were four explosions near a former airport in Vărăncău. It was reported that at least two drones, which presumably struck the area close to the airport with explosives, flew over the village. An hour later, the incident was repeated.

On 5 June, 2022, at 5:10, a drone launched two explosives, most likely RGD-5 grenades, over the parking area of the fleet vehicles of a military reserve unit in Vladimirovca. It was announced by the Transnistrian authorities the next day and no victims or material damage were reported. A criminal case was initiated after the event.

Writing for the think tank Institute for the Study of War, Will Baumgardner concluded that the bombings were "likely a false flag operation executed by the Kremlin intended to draw Transnistria into its invasion of Ukraine".

The Ukrainian Foreign Ministry said that the explosions were part of a plan by Russia to occupy Southern Ukraine in order to establish a land bridge between Transnistria and the Crimea, during the invasion of Ukraine.

== Destabilization ==
During the summer of 2020, the Chișinău International Airport was repeatedly forced to be evacuated after fake bomb threats; some of the threats were traced back to Russia.

Hundreds of cyberattacks have been conducted against Moldovan computer systems.

Moldova was almost entirely dependent on Russian energy supplies. In 2022, Russia delivered less than half the amount of natural gas promised in contracts and instituted a 4-fold price hike for gas supplies to the country, leading to a sharp spike in inflation.

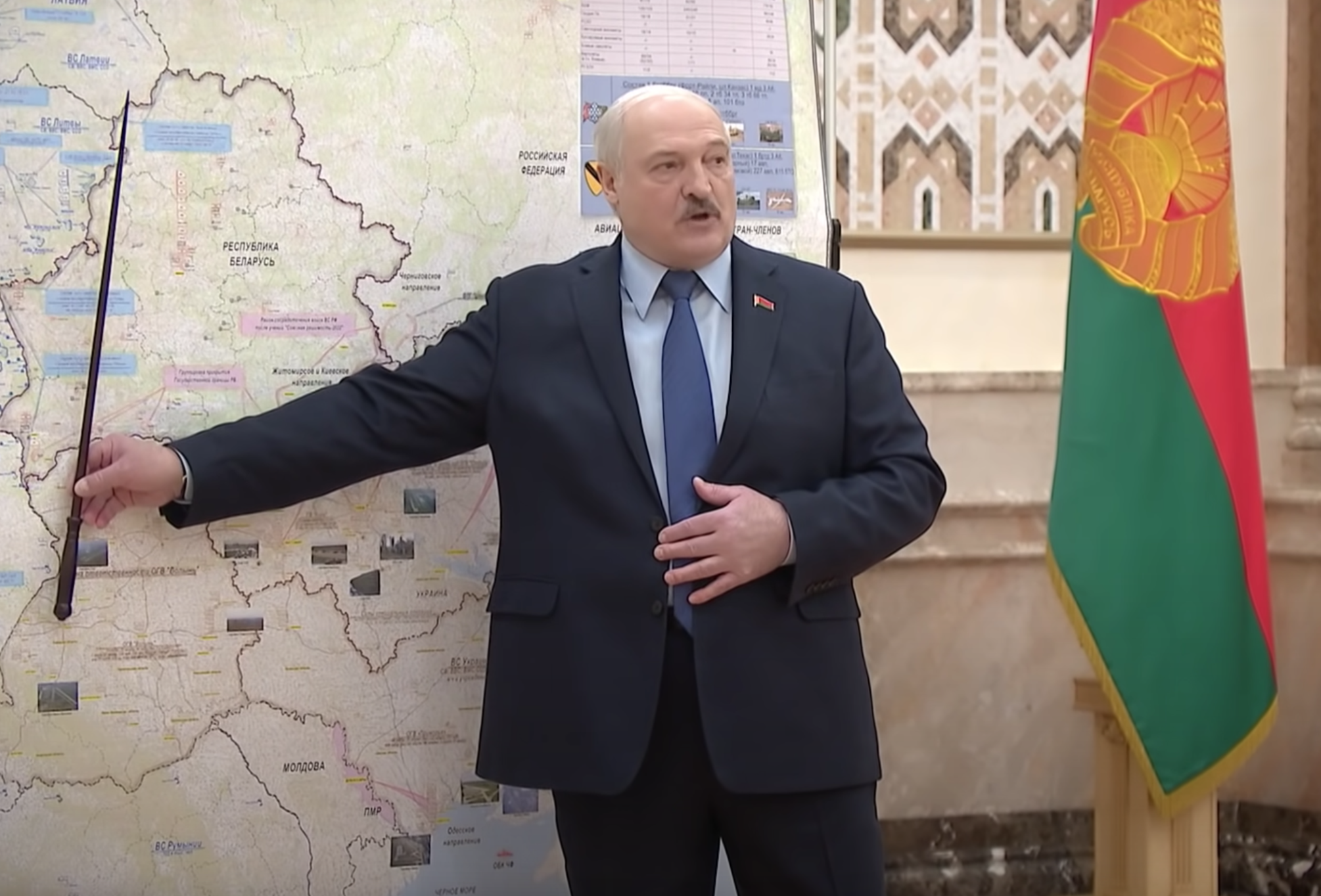
Alexander Lukashenko in front of a war map showing a supposed Russian incursion into Moldova from Odesa.

On 1 March 2022, a video leaked that depicted President of Belarus Alexander Lukashenko standing in front of a battle map showing an incursion into Moldova from Odesa.

On 1 September 2022, Russian Foreign Minister Sergey Lavrov warned Moldova that, 'any action that would threaten the security of our troops [in Transnistria] would be considered ... as an attack on Russia.'

On 19 December 2022, the head of the Intelligence and Security Service of Moldova said that Russia planned to invade Moldova in early 2023. He said that Russia would attempt to create a land corridor to Transnistria. He said, "The question is not whether the Russian Federation will attack the territory of Moldova, but when it will happen."

On 4 February 2023, Russian Foreign Minister Sergey Lavrov said during an interview that Moldova was a new "anti-Russian project" and that the West was turning Moldova into "the next Ukraine".

On 9 February 2023, Ukrainian president Volodymyr Zelenskyy said that Ukrainian intelligence had intercepted plans by Russian intelligence to overthrow the democratically elected government of Moldova to establish control over the country. The allegations were subsequently corroborated by Moldovan intelligence. On 13 February 2023, the president of Moldova Maia Sandu said Moldovan authorities have confirmed the existence of the plot first revealed by Zelenskyy, and revealed details of the alleged plot.

In 2022, protests demanding the resignation of the ruling pro-Western government began being held in the capital amid economic hardships. The protesters espoused pro-Russian and anti-Western views. The protests have been organised by the pro-Russian Șor Party and protesters paid to attend by the party with funds provided by the party's wealthy leader Ilan Shor, with protesters also being offered free rides to the capital to attend the protests. On 10 February 2023, Moldova's pro-Western government resigned amid economic turmoil, repercussions of the invasion, and the protests. On 16 February a new pro-western government under new Prime Minister Dorin Recean was approved by the Parliament.

On 21 February 2023, Moldova warned that Russia may attempt to seize the Chișinău International Airport in order to transfer troops during a coup. Moldova also said that it was preparing for multiple scenarios.

On 23 February 2023, Russia accused Ukraine of preparing to invade Transnistria, which was rejected by Moldova.

On 10 March 2023, Moldova claimed that Russia-linked individuals were plotting an insurrection.

On 12 March 2023, Moldovan police claimed that they had arrested members of a Moscow-orchestrated network trying to destabilize Moldova. The seven people that were arrested were promised $10,000 to organize "mass disorder."

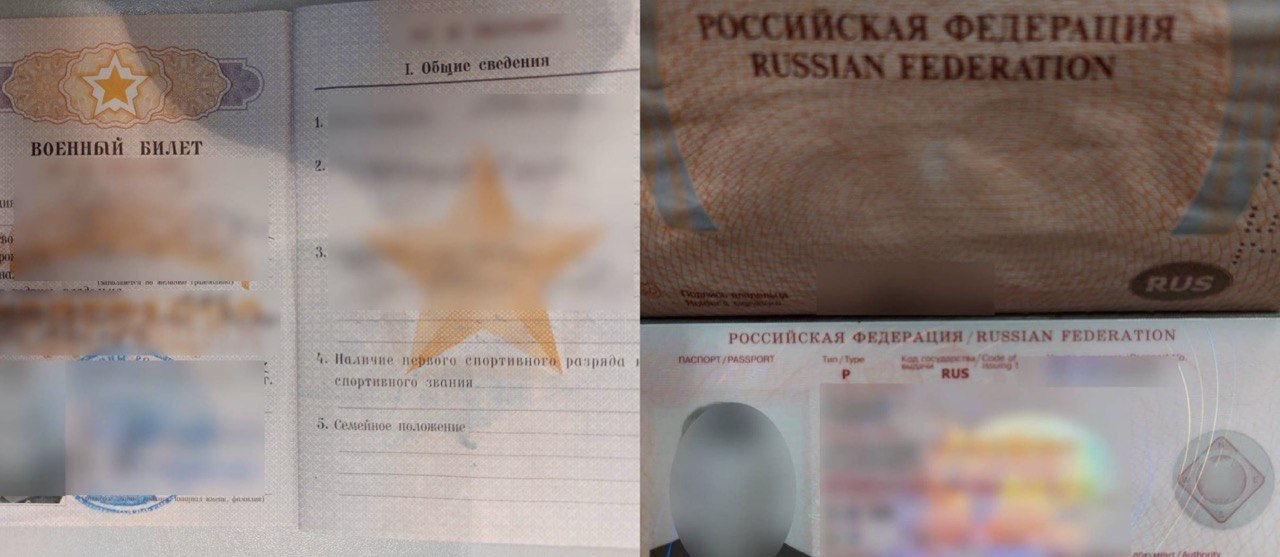
Documents of the representative

On the same day, Moldova denied entry to a representative of PMC Wagner, a Russian mercenary group.

== See also ==
- Belarusian involvement in the Russian invasion of Ukraine
- China and the Russian invasion of Ukraine
- Georgia and the Russian invasion of Ukraine
- Hungary and the Russian invasion of Ukraine
- Iran and the Russian invasion of Ukraine
- Lithuania and the Russian invasion of Ukraine
- United Kingdom and the Russian invasion of Ukraine
- United States and the Russian invasion of Ukraine
