= Denmark and Nord Stream 2 =

Denmark's position to Nord Stream 2

Nord Stream 2 is a 1,234-kilometre-long (767 mi) natural gas pipeline that runs from Russia to Germany through the exclusive economic zones of Finland, Sweden, and Denmark. It is mainly financed by the Russian company Gazprom, and multiple European energy companies.

The initial plan was for the pipeline to run through Danish territorial waters. However, after the application stalled for almost two years, the company behind Nord Stream 2 withdrew their application and instead applied to run the pipeline through the Danish exclusive economic zone, which necessitated an environmental permit only. The reluctance to accept the application was due to the pipeline, one of 23 gas pipelines between Europe and Russia, becoming a geopolitical matter, in which Denmark's closest allies had conflicting interests. This placed Denmark in a difficult position regarding whether or not to accept the proposal.

Nord Stream 1 and 2 were blown up in September 2022 near the Bornholm island of Denmark during the Russian invasion of Ukraine. The case remains unsolved and the Danish government suspended further investigation into the case in February 2024 without naming any suspects, stating there was no basis for pursuing a criminal case. The German investigation continues and in June 2024 it issued an arrest warrant for a Ukrainian diver who was allegedly the mastermind of the sabotage.

== Background ==
Nord Stream 2 is an economic and commercial project, intendent to accommodate the growing shortage of natural gas within Europe, in particularly Germany, with both Russia and Germany in favour for the project. However, after the Russian annexation of Crimea in 2014, Europe's reliance on Russia for gas became a geopolitical concern, complicating the build of Nord Stream 2. While Russia and Germany continued to defend Nord Stream 2, citing it as a commercial venture that should not be politicized, the US argued vehemently against the pipeline, saying that it constituted a security and defence threat. The US claimed that this new gas pipeline would increase European dependency on Russia, pointing to so-called "energy blackmail" as an imminent threat, and even went as far to sanction companies that assisted with the completion of the pipeline. However, the US also had economic interests at play, namely around the sale of liquefied natural gas (LNG) to Europe. Baltic countries such as Poland and Ukraine were also against the approval of the pipeline, having previously experienced Russian "energy blackmail".

== Reason for debate ==
Despite Denmark not needing any additional natural gas, it became the centre of the geopolitical conflict when the company behind Nord Stream 2 in April 2017, in accordance with the UN Convention on the Law of the Sea, applied for permission to build transit pipelines in Danish territorial sea, namely the waters south of Bornholm. The gas pipes would also pass through Finland and Sweden, but unlike Denmark, it was only through the respective countries’ exclusive economic zones, where it in Denmark's case was about territorial sea. This difference meant that Sweden and Finland only had to prepare environmental assessments and the accompanying permits, while Denmark, on the other hand, had the possibility to deny the route.

While the US is Denmark's most significant security ally, its second largest investor and third largest export market, Germany is arguably the most important EU partner for Denmark. This led to the issue of Nord Stream 2 to be viewed by some experts as the "most important decision in Danish foreign policy after the Cold War", as it was about how Denmark would position itself in relation to Germany, American and Russian interests. The voices of prominent Danish experts were however divided – some argued that Danish government should allow the Nord Stream 2 to go through Danish territorial sea, while others warned strongly against it.

=== Danish political parties' views ===
Although the Danish Government had permitted Nord Stream 1 in 2009, an almost identical pipeline, it was in a different and difficult predicament regarding Nord Stream 2. The situation and attitude towards the Nord Stream pipelines had changes after the 2014 annexation of Crimea, and Denmark's allies had conflicting interest. While the opposition, including Social Demokratiet and Radikale Venstre, wanted the construction of Nord Stream 2 prevented as they considered it a problematic security matter, the supporting party of the government, Dansk Folkeparti, held a different view. They found the matter of Nord Stream 2 to be a "simple trade agreement". The party strongly criticized the way in which the matter had become subject to "geopolitical games". The government at the time, consisting of Venstre, Liberal Alliance og Det Konservative Folkeparti, did not comment directly on the matter but was nevertheless behind a bill that would make it possible to include foreign, security and defense considerations in the assessment of applications regarding infrastructure projects in Danish maritime territory. The bill, led to an amendment of the Continental Shelf Act, which came to force on January the 1st 2018. The amendment gave the Danish Ministry of Foreign Affairs the right to include foreign, security and defense policy considerations in the assessment of applications pertaining to projects in the Danish sea territory. The amendment was also applicable to North Stream 2 as it was retroactive in its effects.

== Applications from Nord Stream ==
On 3 April 2017, the Danish Energy Agency (DEA) received an application from the Nord Stream 2 company regarding permission to build transit pipelines in Danish sea territory. Denmark was however slow to respond due to geopolitical implications of the decision, and the amendment of the Continental Shelf Act made it possible to shift the matter from the DEA to Danish Ministry of Foreign Affairs. The Danish government also sought to shift the decision of the pipeline to the EU, but without any success. The Nord Stream 2 company submitted a new application on 10 August 2018, in which it requested permission to build the pipeline through an alternative route north of Bornholm, as well as a third application on 15 April 2019, at the request of the DEA, which contained two further proposals for routes on the continental shelf southeast of Bornholm. The DEA stated in connection with the third application that the first application from 2017 was still being assessed by the Foreign Minister, and while it was advancing it was not yet completed. The application from 2018 was also advancing, as it had been through the public Espoo hearing, but the permit would now await assessment of the new southeastern routes from the 2019 application.

=== Permit for a southeast route ===
On 28 June 2019, the Nord Stream 2 company withdrew their first application from 3 April 2017, in which they were seeking permission to build transit pipelines in Danish territorial waters, leaving only the two applications from 2018 and 2019. These two applications were concerning routes that went through the Danish EEZ, but not Danish sea territory, whereby only an environmental assessment and permit would be necessary. Matthias Waring, the director of Nord Stream 2, stated that they had felt compelled to withdraw their application as there had been no indication that the Danish government was near a decision. On 30 October 2019, the DEA granted Nord Stream 2 a permit for the construction of natural gas pipelines on the Danish continental shelf southeast of Bornholm, hereby accepting one of the routes from the third application from 28 January 2019. Referring to the UN Convention on the Law of the Sea, DEA stated in a press release that Denmark was obliged to allow the construction of the transit pipelines with respect to the environment and recourses, and a permit was therefore released pursuant to the Continental Shelf Act.

Through what has been described by the Danish media as a "cunning" act, the Danish Energy Agency and the Ministry of Foreign Affairs succeeded in dragging out the Danish approval of the pipeline long enough for the Nord Stream 2 company to formally withdraw their application for the initial route, turning the matter from a decision by the Danish government into a question of international law. The Danish government managed to balance the interests of Denmark, without actually making a decision regarding the application of the initial route, and thereby managed to avoid directly opposing any of the conflicting interests of its allies.
