= Commons (news website) =

Taiwan-based Hong Kong news website

- Type: Online-only news
- Founder(s): Michael Ngan
- Editor-in-chief: A Muk
- Founded: October 2021
- Political alignment: Pro-democracy
- Language: Chinese
- Website: commonshk.com

Commons (Chinese: 同文) is a Taiwan-based Hong Kong news website established in 2021. Founded in response to the consecutive shutdowns of pro-democratic media outlets in Hong Kong, the website primarily covers political news and features interviews with members of the Hong Kong diaspora.

== History ==
Commons was founded in October 2021 in Taiwan, following the shutdowns of pro-democratic media outlets Stand News and Citizen News, and aims to fill the information deficit left by these media outlets. It primarily focuses on interviews, but also covers both Hong Kong and international news, addressing a wide range of political topics considered controversial under the Hong Kong national security law. The website has headquarters in both Taiwan and the United Kingdom, and chose Taiwan as its base for its shared timezone with Hong Kong to provide more timely reports on local news. It was established by a team of eight, including former journalists from the now-defunct Apple Daily, and politician Michael Ngan, who also serves as the website's chief international affairs critic. A Taiwanese-Hongkonger known by the pseudonym "A Muk" serves as the chief editor, while scholar Simon Shen acts as the coordinator for the editorial team. Nilk Wu, co-founder of DB Channel, moved to Taiwan and joined Commons after Frankie Fung, another co-founder of DB Channel, was arrested for violating national security laws in 2021. Within six months of its launch, the website published over 50 interviews featuring stories about overseas Hongkongers in Taiwan, Canada, United Kingdom, and Europe. In its early days, many overseas Hongkongers from the United Kingdom and Canada were hired by Commons to conduct interviews and report on local events, aiming to provide 24-hour news coverage of the Hong Kong diaspora globally, but following the emergence of similar overseas media after the 2019–2020 Hong Kong protests, Commons redefined its focus to cover news and events that mainstream media often overlooked.

In 2022, Commons sent journalists, including Nilk Wu, to Ukraine and Poland to report on the Russian invasion of Ukraine. An editor using the pseudonym "YC" explained that they took up war journalism because they found the situation in Ukraine to be similar to the 2019–2020 Hong Kong protests and many Hongkongers were concerned about the human rights situation there. By July 2022, Commons had only retained two full-time staff members, including A Muk and another staff member focused on news design, along with six stringers spread across Taiwan, the United Kingdom, and Canada. The journalists operated on a rotating schedule, working two to three days each week. Voice of America noted that Commons provided rare and new opportunities for the growing number of ex-journalists in the Hong Kong diaspora; while the BBC found that Commons was able to amplify the overlooked voices of migrating Hongkongers.

Commons launched an audio news series on YouTube and Patreon in 2023, and included video interviews with overseas Hongkongers in a podcast style, with two to three videos posted weekly. The website does not have a subscription model, and all content is freely accessible online. Given its coverage of controversial political subjects, no companies advertise on the site, and its expenses have relied on public donations. Due to a lack of operational funding, Commons began reducing its written news coverage of international affairs starting in late April 2023. As of May 2023, the website had over 42,000 followers on Facebook and 21,000 followers on Instagram. By July 2023, Commons had three full-time staff members based in Taiwan and the United Kingdom.
