= China and the Russo-Ukrainian war =

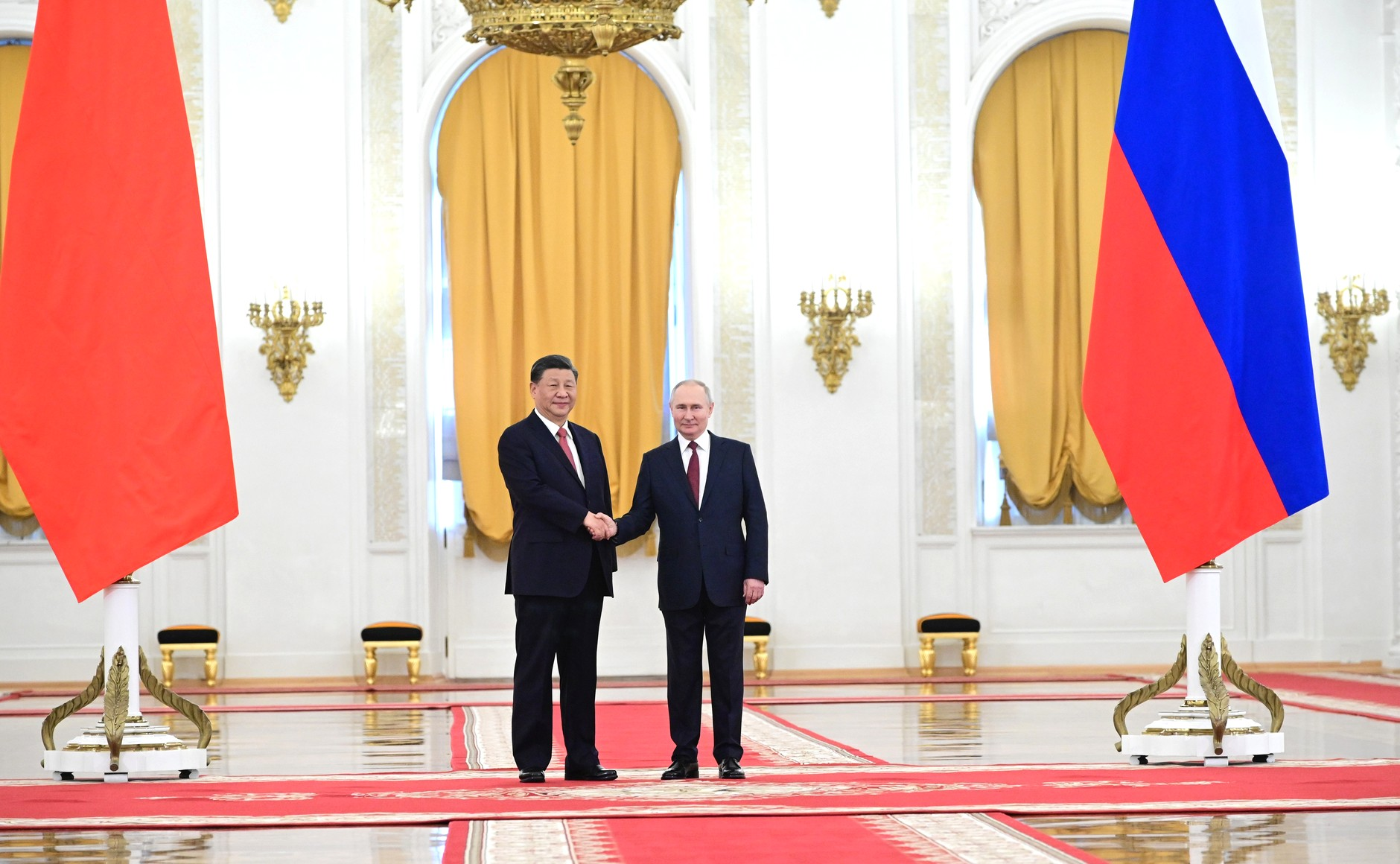
Chinese leader Xi Jinping meeting with Russian president Vladimir Putin at the official welcoming ceremony in the Grand Kremlin Palace in Moscow, 21 March 2023

In the immediate aftermath of the 2022 Russian invasion of Ukraine, the People's Republic of China stated that it respects Ukraine's sovereignty but Russia's opposition to the enlargement of NATO should also be addressed. It abstained from United Nations votes that condemned the invasion. The Chinese government has attempted to mediate between the two countries, but its proposals have been rejected as being pro-Russia. Since 2022, China and Russia maintained close relations, with Chinese leader Xi Jinping and Russian president Vladimir Putin exchanging several state visits. In 2025, Chinese foreign minister Wang Yi was reported to have told the European Union's top diplomat that China cannot accept Russia losing its war against Ukraine. China has consistently objected to international sanctions against Russia. International sanctions led Russia to become heavily economically and technologically dependent on China.

Drones made by Chinese manufacturers are used by both sides in the conflict, with Russia receiving a surge of key drone components from China in 2025 along with other support. (Note: Russian enterprise IEMZ Kupol was reported in late 2024 to have established a military drone production program in China with assistance from Chinese specialists.) Chinese companies and individuals involved in the export of dual-use technology and component parts from China to Russia have drawn sanctions from the U.S., European Union, and Ukraine and condemnation from the G7 and NATO. Russians have also been reported to have been trained at military facilities in China. Commentary critical of Russia has been censored on the internet in China, and Chinese state media outlets and netizens have often given more weight to Russian state views, sometimes reposting disinformation. In addition to capturing Chinese nationals fighting for Russia, Ukraine has sanctioned Chinese companies it accuses of helping Russia produce weapons. In 2026, it was reported that large-scale disguised shipments to Russia by a Chinese state-controlled company containing materials were used to build drones for attacking Ukraine.

== Chinese government ==
Only after the invasion began did the Chinese embassy in Ukraine, on 25 February, advise its citizens to leave the country immediately. On 7 March 2022, the Chinese government stated that it had evacuated most Chinese citizens. Some of the students who had been trapped in Ukraine criticised the embassy's poor response.

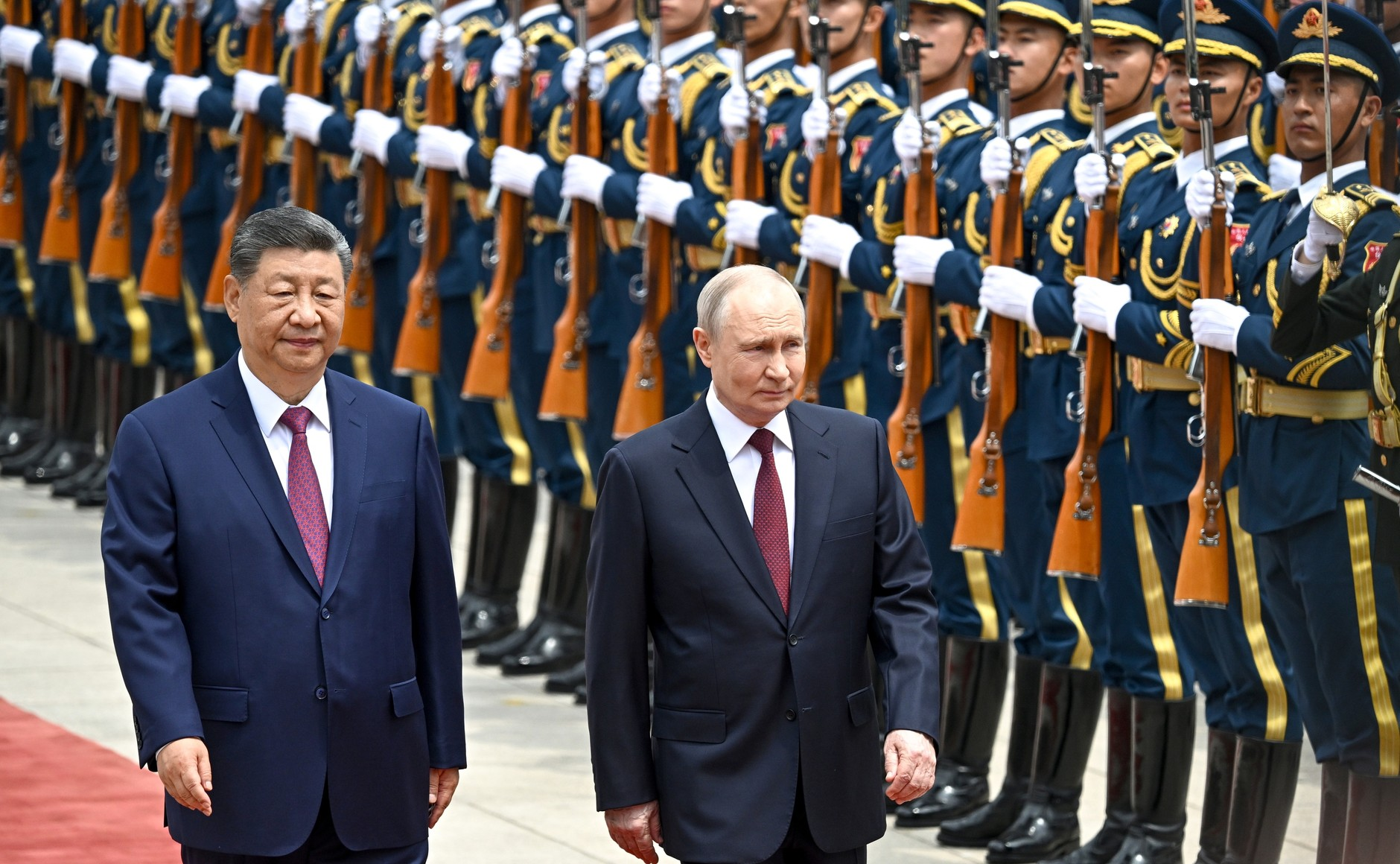
Xi Jinping and Vladimir Putin reviewing People's Liberation Army troops during a welcome ceremony in Beijing, 20 May 2026

On 2 March 2022, The New York Times published an article citing a Western intelligence report which said that the Chinese government had asked the Russian government to delay the invasion until after the 2022 Winter Olympics. The Chinese government denied the allegations, stating that the goal of "this kind of rhetoric is to divert attention and shift blame, which is utterly despicable".

On 15 March 2022, Chinese Ambassador to the United States Qin Gang wrote an op-ed in The Washington Post stating that "conflict between Russia and Ukraine does no good for China", that "the sovereignty and territorial integrity of all countries, including Ukraine, must be respected; the legitimate security concerns of all countries must be taken seriously", and that "threats against Chinese entities and businesses, as uttered by some U.S. officials, are unacceptable".

On 29 April 2022, Zhao Lijian, one of the Chinese Foreign Ministry spokespersons, called China–Russia relations a "new model of international relations" that involved "not causing confrontations or targeting other nations", rising above "the model of military and political alliance in the Cold War era".

Quoting the Russian parliament, The New York Times reported that in September 2022 Li Zhanshu, the chairman of the Standing Committee of the National People's Congress and the third highest-ranking Politburo Standing Committee member of the Chinese Communist Party (CCP), blamed NATO for expanding next to Russia and told a group of Russian legislators that "we fully understand the necessity of all the measures taken by Russia" and that it was placed in an "impossible situation" on the Ukrainian issue. The Wall Street Journal reported that to advance its own interests, Russia has repeatedly leaked information without Chinese knowledge or ahead of China's announcements and decisions. According to people close to China's top decision-makers, had they known about Russia's intention to leak Li's comments, his "choice of words would have been more careful to prevent China from being seen as an accomplice to Russia".

In November 2022, during the 2022 G20 Bali summit, China objected to calling the 2022 Russian invasion of Ukraine a "war". In the same month, Russia's ambassador to Beijing announced that Xi Jinping would be visiting Moscow, reportedly before China was ready for an announcement. The Wall Street Journal quoted people close to the Chinese leadership saying that the "Chinese side hadn't even made a decision yet".

According to U.S. intercepts of Russian intelligence from the 2022–2023 Pentagon document leaks, Russia believed that China had approved sending "lethal aid" disguised as civilian items. U.S. officials said that they have not yet seen evidence, but have repeatedly warned China against doing so.

On 31 January 2024, during a meeting between admiral Dong Jun and Sergei Shoigu, Dong stated the militaries of Russia and China should be bolstering mutual trust and expanding cooperation to "elevate the relations between the two militaries to a higher level". According to the transcript of the meeting released by the Russian Defense Ministry, Dong stated that China would continue to support Russia on the 'Ukraine issue', and despite pressure from the United States and the European Union, "China will not abandon its established policies and the outside world will not interfere with normal cooperation between China and Russia". When asked about Dong's statements at a press briefing, Foreign Ministry of China spokesperson Wang Wenbin stated that China's position remains unchanged and does not provide military aid to either side of the conflict. In February 2024, at the 60th Munich Security Conference, Wang Yi discussed peace prospects with Ukraine's foreign minister and stated that China will not "sell lethal weapons in conflict zones".

In April 2024, the Royal United Services Institute (RUSI) reported that a sanctioned Russian ship transferring weapons from North Korea to Russia was moored at a Chinese shipyard in Zhejiang.

=== Meetings with foreign leaders ===
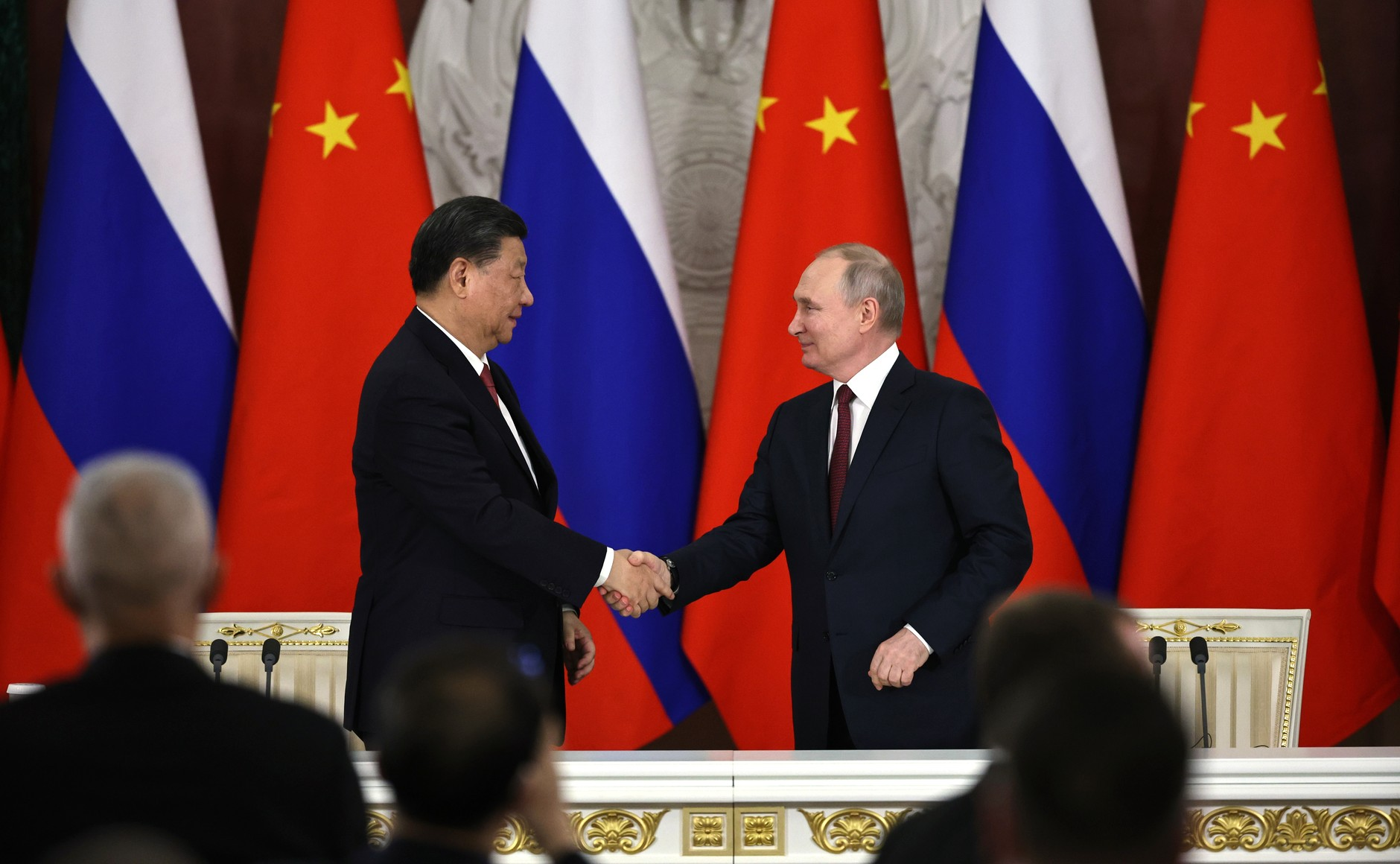
Putin welcomes Xi Jinping to Moscow, 21 March 2023

On 1 March 2022, the Ukrainian and Chinese foreign ministers, Dmytro Kuleba and Wang Yi, held their first phone call since the beginning of the invasion. Chinese media reported that Wang told Kuleba that he was "extremely concerned" about the risk to civilians and that it was necessary to "ease the situation as much as possible to prevent the conflict from escalating". Kuleba was reported to have said that Ukraine "looks forward to China playing a mediation role in achieving a ceasefire".

On 9 March 2022, General Secretary of the Chinese Communist Party and Chinese leader Xi Jinping held a video meeting with French President Emmanuel Macron and German Chancellor Olaf Scholz in which he stated that China was "pained to see the flames of war reignited in Europe" and called for the three countries to promote peace negotiations between Russia and Ukraine. Later that month, Xi and American President Joe Biden held a two-hour long meeting over video in which the conflict in Ukraine featured significantly. The American White House told the press after the call that Biden had warned Xi of "consequences if China provides material support to Russia".

On 20–22 March 2023, Xi visited Russia and met with Vladimir Putin, both in an official and unofficial capacity.

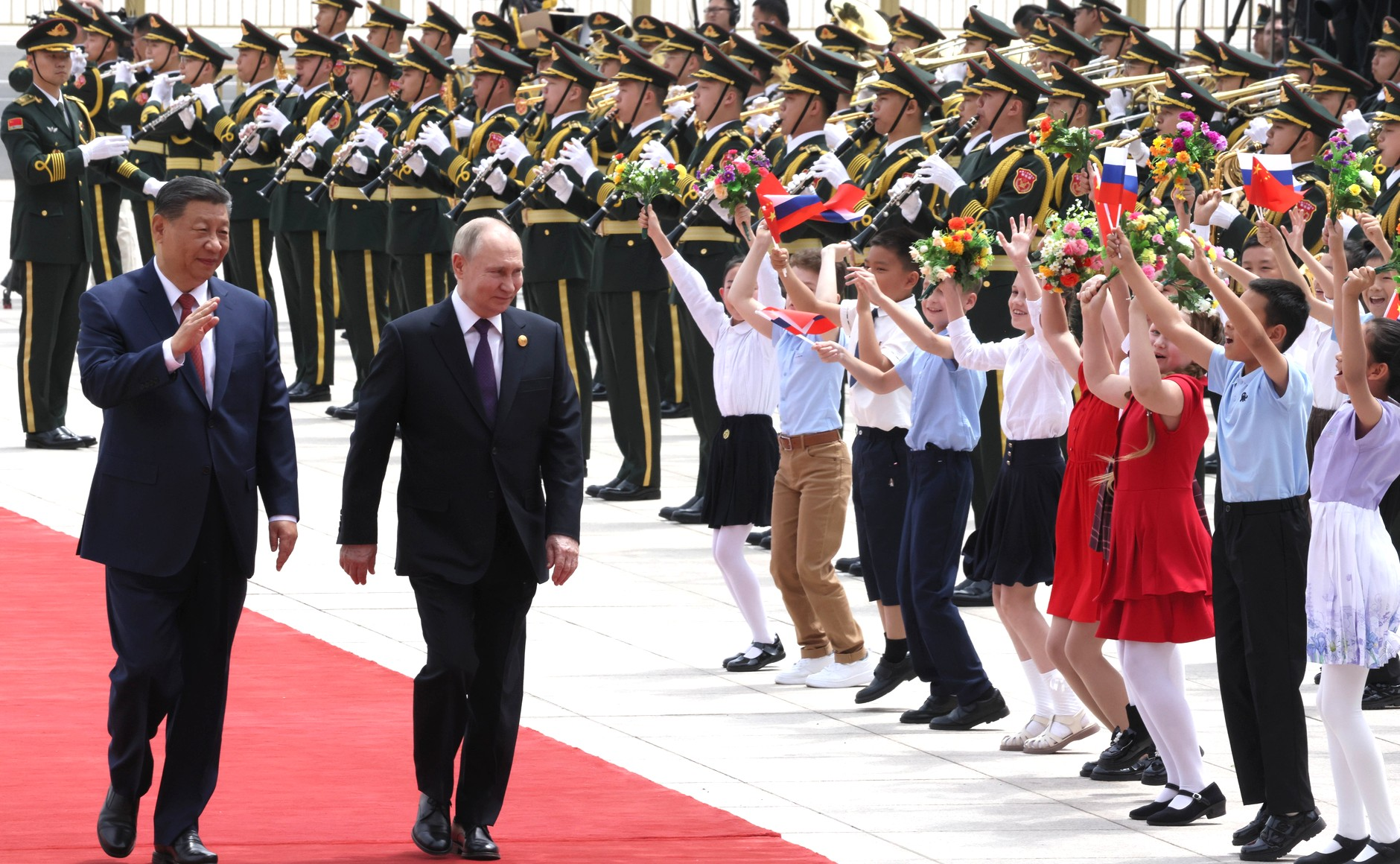
Xi Jinping welcomes Putin in Beijing during Putin's visit to China in May 2024.

On 26 April 2023, Xi made an hour-long call to Ukrainian President Volodymyr Zelenskyy. Zelenskyy described the call as "long and meaningful" and stressed "a just and sustainable peace for Ukraine".

During Xi's visit to France in May 2024, he said to Emmanuel Macron and European Commission President Ursula von der Leyen that Beijing did not intend to supply weapons to Moscow and that it was ready to look into the issue of dual-use materials that enabled Russia's war effort.

In May 2024, Putin visited China and met with Xi. The purpose of the visit was to deepen the strategic partnership between Russia and China.

On 23 July 2024, the Ukrainian Foreign Minister Dmytro Kuleba visited China for the first time since the Russian invasion for talks with Chinese Foreign Minister Wang Yi on ways to achieve a diplomatic solution to the war. The South China Morning Post and CNN reported that in a July 2025 meeting with Vice-President of the European Commission Kaja Kallas, Wang Yi stated that Beijing did not want to see Russia's loss in Ukraine. European diplomats said Wang Yi is concerned that the United States would focus more on China once the conflict in Europe ends.

In May 2025, Xi visited Russia to attend the Moscow Victory Day Parade. During the visit, he met with Vladimir Putin. This was reciprocated in October 2025, when Putin visited China to attend the 2025 Tianjin SCO summit and the 2025 China Victory Day Parade. In May 2026, Vladimir Putin undertook a state visit to China.

=== United Nations votes ===
On 25 February 2022, China abstained from a United Nations Security Council vote denouncing the invasion. On 2 March 2022, China joined 35 countries in abstaining from a United Nations General Assembly resolution which condemned Russia's aggression and demanded Russia's "immediate, thorough, and unconditional" withdrawal of troops from Ukraine. In December 2023, China voted against condemning Russia at the United Nations.

=== Peace proposals ===
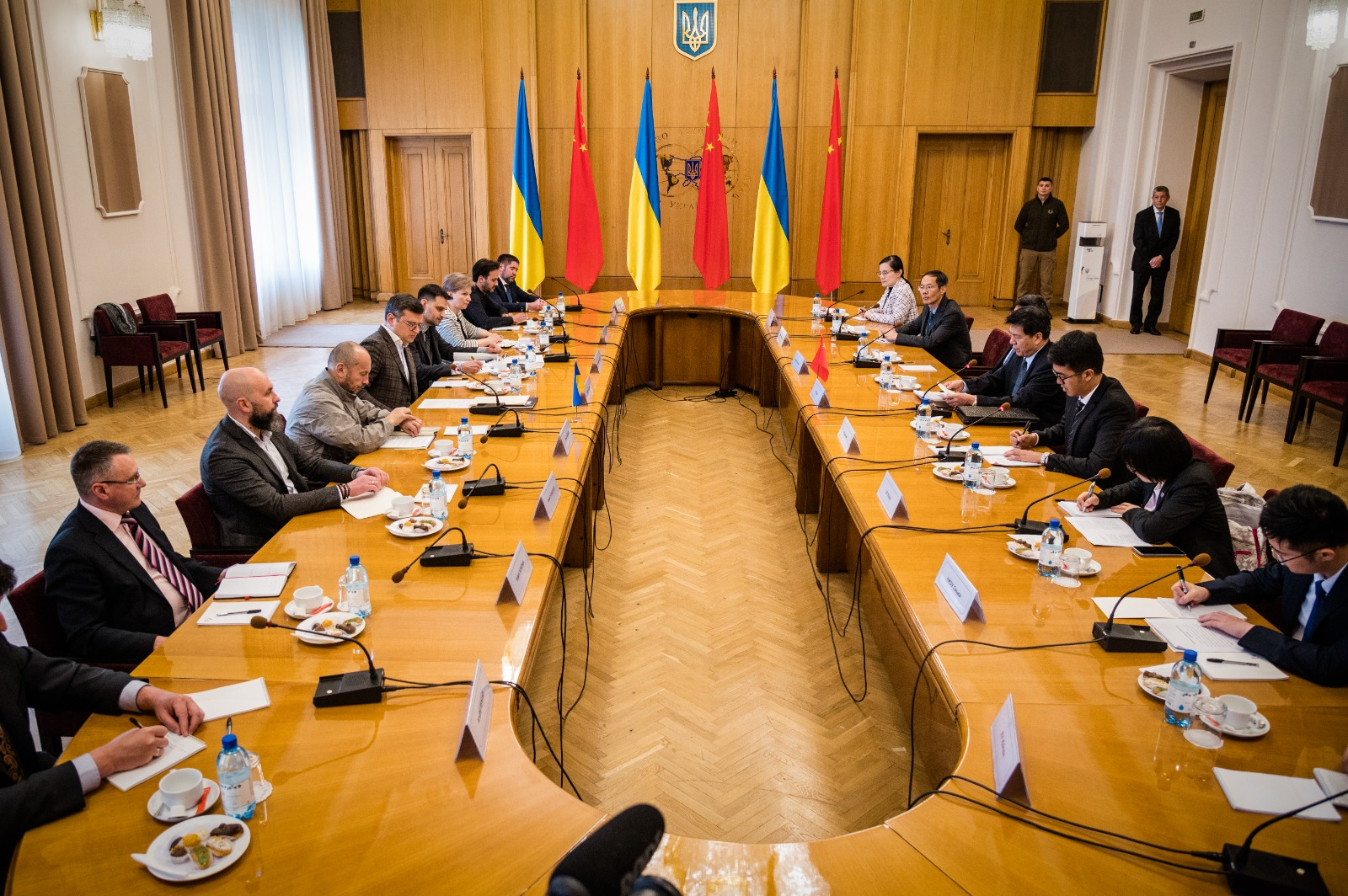
Chinese peace envoy Li Hui meets with Ukrainian foreign minister Dmytro Kuleba in Kyiv (17 May 2023).

On 24 February 2023, China issued a twelve-point peace plan outline, calling for a ceasefire and peace talks. The same day, Zelenskyy indicated he was willing to consider aspects of the proposal, while Russia's foreign ministry stated that it welcomed the Chinese proposal. Zelenskyy stated that he planned to meet Xi Jinping because it would be useful to both countries and global security. Vladimir Putin's spokesperson Dmitry Peskov said "we paid a lot of attention to our Chinese friends' plan", but new "territorial realities could not be ignored" as these realities became "an internal factor" (for Russia). Peskov then rejected the Chinese peace proposal, saying that "for now, we don't see any of the conditions that are needed to bring this whole story towards peace". U.S. Secretary of State Antony Blinken questioned China's peace proposal, saying "the world should not be fooled by any tactical move by Russia, supported by China or any other country, to freeze the war on its own terms".

During the 2023 Belarus-China summit, Belarusian President Alexander Lukashenko and Xi jointly stated "deep concern about the development of the armed conflict in the European region and extreme interest in the soonest possible establishment of peace in Ukraine[.]"

In June 2023, China's envoy to Ukraine Li Hui urged all parties to respect territorial integrity, stop arming the battlefield, and ensure the safety of nuclear facilities.

Following the 2023 Shangri-La Dialogue, Ukrainian Defense Minister Oleksii Reznikov said that the peace plans presented by other countries such as China were attempts to mediate on behalf of Russia and that Ukraine is willing to accept a mediator only if the Russians can be convinced to withdraw from all Ukrainian territories.

China's 12-point peace plan was presented during a 42-nation peace discussion on 5 August 2023, at Jeddah, Saudi Arabia, and live feedback was received.

In early May 2024, China's designated envoy on the Russian-Ukrainian conflict had visited neutral nations of the Global South like Brazil, Indonesia, Turkey, Egypt, Saudi Arabia, the United Arab Emirates, South Africa, and Kazakhstan.

On 23 May 2024, China presented a new six-point peace plan, but according to critics, including Zelenskyy, Russia called on China to undermine the June 2024 Ukraine peace summit in Switzerland. According to sources, Chinese diplomats told developing countries that the peace summit in Switzerland would prolong the war, but did not directly ask any country to abstain from the meeting. The six-point proposal by China and Brazil called for an international peace conference "held at a proper time that is recognised by both Russia and Ukraine, with equal participation of all parties as well as fair discussion of all peace plans".

In June 2024, Former Thai Prime Minister Abhisit Vejjajiva said that because of the fundamental lack of trust between the United States and China, and their allies, "it's so difficult to see how either side can claim legitimacy to initiate some kind of peace summit. The other side is simply not going to accept it." On 14 June 2024, China's deputy permanent representative to the United Nations, Geng Shuang, called "on the parties to the conflict to demonstrate political will, come together, and start peace talks as soon as possible to achieve a ceasefire and halt military actions".

In September 2024, Zelenskyy called a peace plan proposed by China and Brazil "destructive" and "just a political statement".

=== Accusations of intelligence sharing and covert training ===
Since 2024, PLA soldiers have undertaken combat training, particularly for drone warfare, at a complex near Volgograd. In July 2025, the Security Service of Ukraine announced it had detained two Chinese nationals suspected of spying on Ukraine's Neptune missile program. One of the Chinese nationals was a former student in Kyiv, who was arrested by counterintelligence officials after they gave him "technical documentation" concerning production of the missiles. They later detained the father of the former student, also a Chinese national, who they said had arrived in Ukraine to "personally coordinate" the work of his son and deliver the documents to the Chinese special services.

In October 2025, Ukrainian Foreign Intelligence Agency official Oleh Alexandrov said that China was providing Russia with satellite intelligence to better launch missiles into Ukraine. The same month, Ukrainian media reported that Chinese reconnaissance flights had been observed in western Ukraine over locations struck by Russian forces, suggesting possible surveillance in support of Russia. Russia denied Chinese involvement, while some analysts have said that Russia's lack of access to critical parts due to sanctions and outdated satellites makes Chinese surveillance support particularly valuable for Russia.

In May 2026, it was reported that three European intelligence agencies believed that over 200 Russians had been covertly trained in drone warfare at military facilities in Beijing and Nanjing in late 2025. The training involved at least four Chinese and Russian generals.

== State media ==
The coverage of the Russian invasion of Ukraine by mainland Chinese media has raised some controversies. The European External Action Service stated that "Chinese state-controlled media and official social media channels have amplified selected pro-Kremlin conspiracy narratives". BBC and CNN believe that discussions of the topic in mainland China are led by Chinese state media outlets, including Global Times, China Central Television (CCTV), and People's Daily. China Daily blamed the United States as the driving force for the Russian invasion. The journalistic integrity of these outlets has been called into question. As an example, it was suspected that two days before the full-scale invasion of Ukraine, Horizon News, the international relations subsection of The Beijing News, accidentally released an internal notice publicly on its official Weibo account. The internal notice included censorship guidelines that demanded the restriction of content that is "unfavourable to Russia" and "pro-West". On the same day, an article on the Global Times website referred to Donetsk and Luhansk as "two nations". The article was later retracted as mainland Chinese media began to collectively refer to the two areas as "regions". On the day Russia launched its military operation against Ukraine, the Communist Youth League of China posted a rendition of the Soviet patriotic song "Katyusha" in Mandarin on its official bilibili account. Initium Media saw this action as an attempt to sensationalize the military conflict.

Several media outlets believe that Chinese media undertook selective reporting. Some Chinese media outlets received government directives to "keep Weibo posts on Ukraine favorable to Russia." Deutsche Welle and CNN questioned the avoidance of words such as "invasion" and "attack", and the bias towards information from Russian officials, as well as the promotion of anti-U.S. sentiments within China. However, The Wall Street Journal believes that Chinese state-run media outlets were exercising restraint in their coverage of the conflict, an indication of the cautious stance taken by the Chinese government. Radio France Internationale believes that while China has not condemned Russia's invasion, it does not encourage its citizens to support Ukrainians, and has not openly supported Russia.

On 4 March, CCTV started the live broadcast of the opening ceremony of the 2022 Paralympic Winter Games, which was held in Beijing. During the broadcast, the chairman of the International Paralympic Committee Andrew Parsons mentioned the conflict in a speech made in English, harshly condemning the invasion and calling for peace. CCTV muted this segment of the speech, and did not release a complete translation. A shot of 20 Ukrainian athletes applauding and calling for peace was also removed. The International Paralympic Committee believed that censorship took place and demanded an explanation from CCTV.

As of early March, journalist Lu Yuguang of state-run Phoenix Television was the only foreign correspondent to have been embedded with frontline Russian forces.

When covering the Bucha massacre, some Chinese state media promoted unsubstantiated Russian claims that it was staged, seemingly contradicting official statements from China's foreign ministry, which called the images from Bucha "disturbing". They reported on the massacre selectively or qualified it as an allegation made by Ukraine or the United States. On 5 April, CCTV-4 relayed the Russian Foreign Minister Sergey Lavrov's claim that the Bucha massacre is fake news, spread by Ukraine and the West to slander Russia. Chinese state media selectively reported on Ukrainian president Vlodomir Zelenskyy's survey of the scene of the massacre, but did not report on the horrific nature of the scene and the pleas from local residents. Global Times claimed that the Bucha massacre was a publicity stunt, in which the U.S. was involved. CCTV made a report in the news at noon on 5 April, in line with the Russian side's allegation that the massacre in Bucha was fake, entitled "Russian Foreign Minister: Uncovering the lies of the Bucha case". As of 6 April, state-run Chinese media outlets such as Xinhua News Agency and People's Daily had not reported on the Bucha massacre in detail.

=== Social media ===
In April 2025, it was reported that the Russian military was actively recruiting across Chinese social media.

== Industry ==
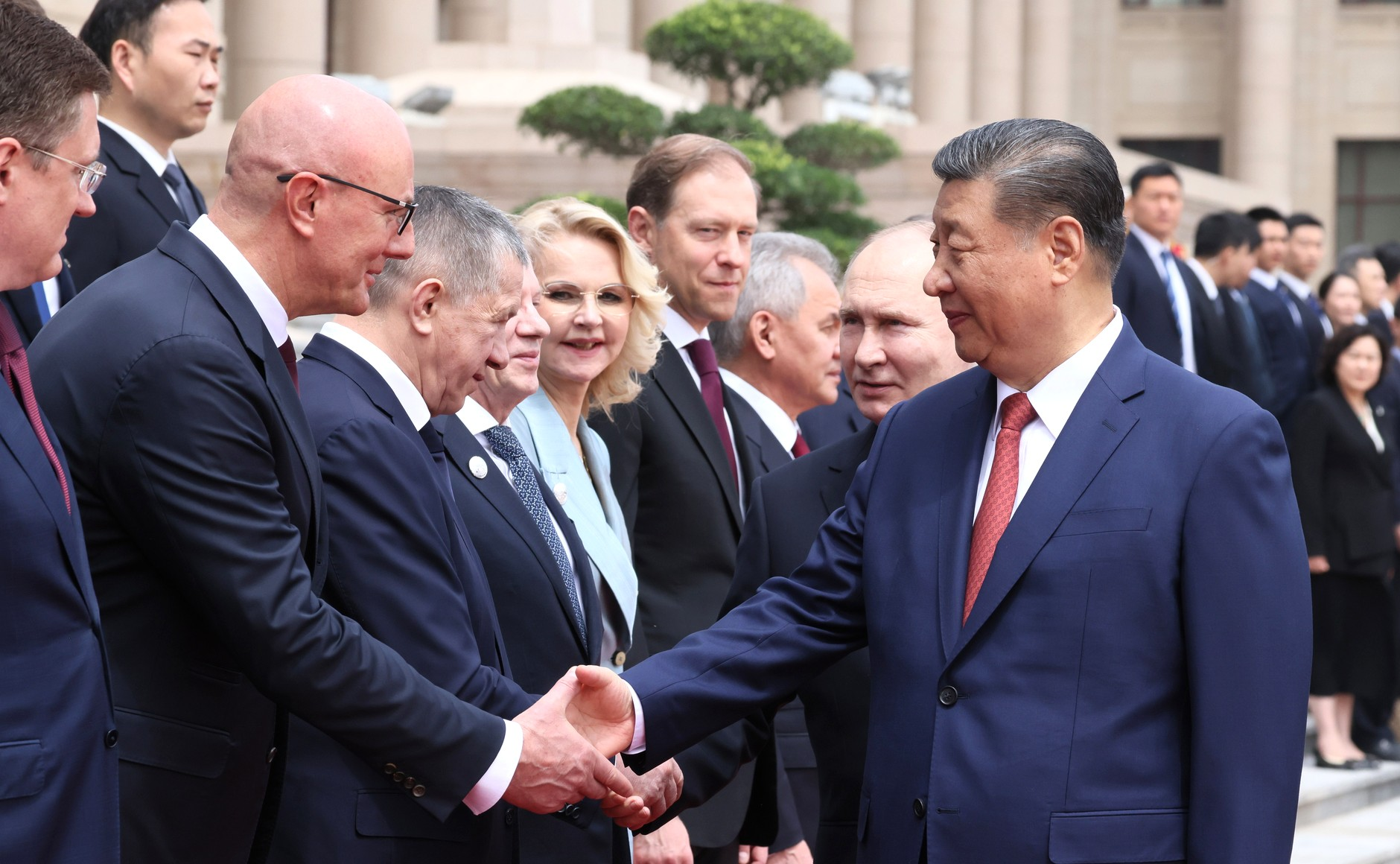
Xi Jinping meets the Russian delegation in Beijing, 2024

In January 2023, Bloomberg News reported that the U.S. government confronted the Chinese about their state-owned enterprises providing non-lethal assistance to Russia. The sources declined to discuss any evidence in detail except to say that the assistance stopped short of evading wholesale the sanctions "the US and its allies imposed" after Russia invaded Ukraine. The White House said it was monitoring and reviewing the situation.

In February 2023, The Wall Street Journal reported that according to Russian customs data, Chinese companies have shipped dual-use items such as navigation equipment, jamming technology, and fighter jet parts to Russian state-owned companies. The same month, Der Spiegel reported that Xi'an Bingo Intelligent Aviation Technology was in talks to sell kamikaze drones to Russia. Chinese companies have called the reports inaccurate. The New York Times subsequently reported that Poly Technologies sent sufficient quantities of gunpower to the Barnaul Cartridge Plant to make 80 million rounds of ammunition. China is a key supplier of nitrocellulose, a key ingredient for modern gunpowder, to Russia.

In March 2023, Politico reported that between June and December 2022, Chinese companies such as the state-owned Norinco shipped dual-use items, including assault rifles, drone parts, and body armor, to Russian companies, which have also been routing shipments via Middle Eastern countries that have relationships with both Russia and the West. U.S. officials stated that according to intelligence gleaned from Russia, China was considering supplying the country with lethal aid. Different American officials expressed varying degrees of confidence in this assessment. The U.S. also said Chinese-made ammunition has been used in Ukraine, although it was unclear who supplied it. Other officials said that they had not seen evidence that China actually supplied arms to Russia. The U.S. statement came at the eve of China's unveiling of its peace plan to stop the war. The Biden administration decided against declassifying any sensitive details of the intelligence report.

In 2023, Izhevsk Electromechanical Plant (IEMZ Kupol) began manufacturing kamikaze drones for the Russian military using Chinese engines and parts. Chinese technical advisers have also assisted IEMZ Kupol. Sources told Reuters that Kupol established a factory in China and delivered seven complete Garpiya-3 drones in early 2024. Chinese officials said they were not aware of the production activity. NATO countries called on China to make sure its companies do not provide lethal assistance to Russia. This demand was also stressed by a representative of the European Union.

In April 2024, the United States and the United Kingdom announced a ban on imports of Russian aluminum, copper, and nickel. Due to sanctions, Russian nickel, copper and palladium mining and smelting company Norilsk Nickel planned to move some of its copper smelting to China and establish a joint venture with a Chinese company. Finished copper products would be sold as Chinese products to avoid Western sanctions. China is Norilsk Nickel's largest export market from 2023. Nickel is a critical metal in electric vehicle batteries, and palladium is critical element in catalytic converters, a component in natural gas vehicles.

In September 2024, the United States Deputy Secretary of State Kurt Campbell said that China is aiding the Russian military, referring to materials given to Russia by China as ″being applied directly to the Russian war machine″. Campbell said that both governments were putting in efforts at the ″highest levels″ to hide and protect their collaboration, and that in exchange for their assistance, Russia was sharing sensitive military technologies with China.

=== Drones ===
Remains of a Russian drone in Rivne Oblast. China has been accused of covertly helping Russia build drones used to strike Ukraine.

In October 2023, the Ukrainian government announced the purchase of 4,000 DJI drones.

In September 2024, Reuters reported that Russia had established a weapons program in China to develop and produce attack drones for use in the invasion of Ukraine. A subsidiary of Russian state-owned company Almaz-Ante, IEMZ Kupol, said it was able to produce drones with assistance from local specialists, including a newly developed model, at scale at a Chinese factory for deployment in the war. Chinese companies have been reported to supply the Alabuga Special Economic Zone for military drone production. By December 2024, China's export curbs on key drone components going to the United States and Europe had affected Ukraine's defense efforts, according to Bloomberg News. In June 2025, China's Silent Hunter anti-drone system was filmed in use by Russian forces against Ukrainian drones. In mid-2025, China's exports of key drone components to Russia sharply increased.

In September 2026, an investigation by The Telegraph and Politico uncovered internal Russian documents showing a Chinese state-owned firm supplying Russia with materials used to build drones which Russia uses to attack Ukraine. According to experts, the scale of the disguised shipments and military importance of the destination suggested that Chinese officials were aware of the transfers.

== Trade ==
Following the implementation of international sanctions during the Russo-Ukrainian War initiated by the U.S., U.K., European Union and Japan, China said it will not join them. China's total trade with Russia was a record $190 billion in 2022. In the same year, China accounted for 40% of Russia's imports. In the first half of 2023, models from Chinese car companies accounted for more than a third of all sales in Russia.

In 2023, China's total trade with Russia reached a record $240 billion. Russia's dependence on the Chinese yuan increased heavily after its invasion of Ukraine in 2022. Yuan's share of stock market trading in Russia increased from 3% to 33% However, by August 2024, Russian transactions with Chinese banks (especially smaller ones) were largely closed. Due to strict secondary sanctions, Russia could not exchange money with China. As many as 98% of Chinese banks rejected direct yuan payments from Russia.

Before the invasion, China preferred trade routes that passed through Russia, but due to sanctions it has been warming up to the costlier Middle Corridor, which has received increased investments from adjacent countries in Europe and the Middle East as well.

== Public society ==
Due to the rise of anti-U.S. sentiments in China in recent years, as well as the bilateral strategic partnership between China and Russia, many netizens in China supported the actions and position taken by the Russian president Vladimir Putin around the beginning of the invasion in 2022. There have also been anti-war and pro-Ukraine voices online, although it has been reported that they have been subjected to attacks from pro-Russia netizens and many such posts had been deleted.

According to Voice of America, a large volume of controversial commentary surfaced on Chinese social media in the early stages of the military conflict between Russia and Ukraine. Coupled with the fact that online discussions are strictly monitored and censored by the state, many believe that Chinese public opinion on the matter is divided, with opposing factions.

On one hand, much commentary is in support of Russia, recognizing Russia's concern for national security, and attributing the deterioration of Russia-Ukraine relations to NATO and Western nations such as the U.S.. As a result, these commentators support the military invasion of Ukraine, and even praise the Russian president Vladimir Putin as a heroic figure that dares to challenge the West.

On the other hand, anti-war figures also exist in mainland China, such as the public figures Jin Xing, Yuan Li, and Ke Lan. Some professors and alumni of institutions, including Peking University and Tsinghua University, also publicly expressed anti-war statements, but these statements have been harshly criticized by netizens, and are censored or deleted on mainland Chinese social media platforms. Chinese company NetEase has published a few videos critical of Russia from Chinese in Ukraine and Ukrainians in China.

Some Chinese netizens made inappropriate comments related to "taking in beautiful Ukrainian women", which have been reposted by foreign media. The circulation of the translated comments spread to Ukraine, inciting widespread anti-Chinese sentiment and causing Chinese people living there to face local hostility. Such comments have also been found on social media in Taiwan, prompting the Cyberspace Administration of China (CAC) to post an article accusing Taiwan and Xinjiang "separatist forces" of being responsible. Some mainland netizens also promoted Chinese unification with Taiwan by force in their discussions of the Russian invasion. In response, Chinese state-run media outlet The Paper urged the public to comment on the war rationally, and not to become "vulgar bystanders". Social media platforms in China such as Douyin and Weibo also began deleting posts containing the offending content, with Weibo announcing bans for users posting such content.

On 26 February 2022, five Chinese historians signed an open letter opposing the invasion, stating that "great catastrophes in history often started with local conflicts". However, the letter was removed from the Internet by Chinese censors after three hours. Commentary critical of Russia by Chinese military scholar and Sino-Vietnamese War veteran Gong Fangbin was also censored.

Hong Kong has somewhat different reactions to the Russian invasion from that in mainland China.

On 5 March, Hu Wei, the vice-chairman of the Public Policy Research Center of the Counsellors' Office of the State Council, wrote an article arguing that "China needs to respond flexibly and make strategic choices that conform to its long-term interests" and that "China cannot be tied to Putin and needs to be cut off as soon as possible".

In September 2023, opera singer Wang Fang sparked a diplomatic row after singing the Soviet war song "Katyusha" inside the Donetsk Academic Regional Drama Theater in Mariupol where hundreds were killed in 2022. Wang was part of a group of Chinese bloggers illegally visiting the Ukrainian city. Oleg Nikolenko, spokesman for the Ministry of Foreign Affairs of Ukraine, said that "the performance of the song "Katyusha" by Chinese 'opera singer' Wang Fan on the ruins of the Mariupol Drama Theater, where the Russian army killed more than 600 innocent people, is an example of complete moral degradation". Nikolenko further stated that the Ministry of Foreign Affairs of Ukraine would ban the group of bloggers from entering Ukraine and would expects the Chinese side to explain the purpose of the Chinese citizens' stay in Mariupol, as well as the way they entered the temporarily occupied Ukrainian city. The New York Times reported that the video of Wang and news about it were promptly removed from the Chinese internet.

=== Opinion polling ===
According to a survey conducted by Blackbox Research in March 2022, 71% of respondents from China expressed more sympathy for Ukraine over Russia and 3% expressed more sympathy for Russia. According to a survey published by the US-China Perception Monitor in April 2022, 75% of online Chinese respondents said they agreed or strongly agreed that supporting Russia in the conflict was in China's national interest.

According to a Genron NPO poll released in November 2022 on Chinese peoples' views of the Russian invasion, 39.5% of respondents said the Russian actions "are not wrong", 21.5% said "the Russian actions are a violation of the U.N. Charter and international laws, and should be opposed", and 29% said "the Russian actions are wrong, but the circumstances should be considered".

According to a February 2023 poll conducted by Morning Consult, 49% of Chinese adults said that Beijing should stay neutral in the Ukraine conflict, 12% said Beijing should use its influence to persuade Russia to end its military operations, 9% said they supported supplying strategic intelligence to Russia, and 7% supported sending weapons. The youngest Chinese adults generally expressed the least interest in lending support to Russia.

A September 2024 poll by the Carter Center and Emory University found that 66 percent of mainland Chinese respondents said it was in the country's interests to support Russia's invasion.

== International reactions ==
=== European Union ===
In May 2023, European Union (EU) officials reportedly criticized China's peace plan as an attempt at "freezing" the conflict in place and splitting the West in pushing Ukraine cease-fire. The European Union plans to sanction companies in mainland China, Turkey, India, and Serbia for aiding Russia in circumventing sanctions, targeting entities supplying dual-use goods. Despite concerns, this marks the first time the EU openly targets Chinese companies for sanctions, with diplomats aiming to finalize the plan by the end February 2024. In November 2024, Kaja Kallas stated that China must pay a "higher cost" for its support of Russia. The EU has been critical of Chinese military drones produced for Russia.

==== Sanctions against China ====
In May 2023, the European Union discussed placing sanctions on companies from China and five other countries for selling equipment that could be used in weapons by Russia. The Chinese government made a commitment to put pressure on the China-based companies on the list, prompting the EU to temporarily remove five of the eight Chinese companies on the draft list. In January 2024, the EU proposed export bans on three firms in mainland China. In December 2024, in its 15th sanctions package, the EU included sanctions against several mainland Chinese and Hong Kong entities for supporting Russia's military. In February 2025, the EU added 25 mainland Chinese and Hong Kong entities to a blacklist for circumventing sanctions on Russia, including a drone factory in Xinjiang. In July 2025, the EU sanctioned two Chinese banks for aiding Russia's military. In October 2025, the EU announced that its 19th sanctions package against Russia will include sanctions against four Chinese entities, including two oil refineries involved with the Russian shadow fleet. In April 2026, the EU's 20th sanctions package against Russia included Chinese entities it accused of providing dual-use goods and weapons systems to Russia's military-industrial complex.

=== G7 ===
At its 50th summit in June 2024, the G7 issued a statement criticizing the People's Republic of China for "enabling" the Russian invasion of Ukraine through its "ongoing support for Russia's defense industrial base".

=== NATO ===
On 23 March 2022, NATO Secretary General Jens Stoltenberg accused China of providing political support to Russia, "including by spreading blatant lies and misinformation", and expressed concern that "China could provide material support for the Russian invasion".

In May 2024, Stoltenberg stated that "Russia would not have been able to conduct the war of aggression against Ukraine without the support from China". He warned that China "cannot continue to have normal trade relationships with countries in Europe and at the same time fuel the biggest war we have seen in Europe since the Second World War". At the 2024 Washington summit, NATO called on China to cease its support as a "decisive enabler" of Russia's war effort, criticising its "no limits partnership" with Russia and exports of dual-use technology. China said it "does not provide weapons to the parties to the conflict and strictly controls the export of dual-use articles". In September 2024, Stoltenberg "call[ed] on China to stop supporting Russia's illegal war".

=== United Kingdom ===
In July 2023, Britain's head of MI6, Richard Moore, stated that the Chinese government and Xi Jinping were "absolutely complicit" in the Russian invasion of Ukraine.

In May 2024, former UK defense minister Grant Shapps stated that according to US and British intelligence, "lethal aid" was being flown from China to Russia and into Ukraine. In response, US national security advisor Jake Sullivan stated "we have not seen that to date", but expressed US "concern about what China's doing to fuel Russia's war machine – not giving weapons directly, but providing inputs to Russia’s defence industrial base".

=== United States ===
On 9 July 2022, U.S. Secretary of State Antony Blinken questioned China's neutrality and accused China of supporting Russia.

In April 2024, the U.S. has accused China of supplying Russia with geospatial intelligence. In June, Blinken said China's support for Russia's defense industry was prolonging the war.

On 22 October 2025, the United States imposed sanctions on Russian energy companies Rosneft and Lukoil, affecting their customers in China. In response, Chinese state-owned oil majors suspended purchases from Rosneft and Lukoil.

==== Sanctions against China ====
In April 2022, United States Secretary of Treasury Janet Yellen warned China that it could face consequences for not sanctioning Russia. In June 2022, the United States Department of Commerce placed five Hong Kong companies on the Bureau of Industry and Security's Entity List for providing support to Russia's military. The U.S. Treasury Department separately sanctioned a Chinese and an Armenian vendor for maintaining trade relationship with a Russian arms procurement firm. In September 2022, the Office of Foreign Assets Control sanctioned Sinno Electronics of Shenzhen for supplying a Russian military procurement network.

In January 2023, the U.S. Treasury Department sanctioned Spacety China, also known as Changsha Tianyi Space Science and Technology Research Institute Co. Ltd., for providing satellite imagery to the Wagner Group. In February 2023, the U.S. Commerce Department added AOOK Technology Ltd, Beijing Ti-Tech Science and Technology Development Co, Beijing Yunze Technology Co, and China HEAD Aerospace Technology Co to the Entity List for aiding Russia's military.

In March 2023, the U.S. Treasury Department sanctioned five Chinese companies for supplying equipment to the Iran Aircraft Manufacturing Industries Corporation, which manufactures HESA Shahed 136 drones used by Russia against Ukraine.

In July 2023, the U.S. Office of the Director of National Intelligence published a report stating that the Chinese government is assisting Russia to evade sanctions and providing it with dual-use technology.

In October 2023, the U.S. Department of Commerce added 42 Chinese companies to the Entity List for supplying Russia with microelectronics for missile and drone guidance systems. In April 2024, the Department of Commerce sanctioned a Chinese company for supporting Russia's military through the procurement, development, and proliferation of Russian drones. In May 2024, the U.S. sanctioned 20 companies in mainland China and Hong Kong for supplying Russia's military. In October 2024, the U.S. sanctioned two companies, Xiamen Limbach Aircraft Engine Co. and Redlepus Vector Industry, involving the production of long-range attack drones for Russia, including the Garpiya.

=== Ukraine ===
In May 2022, Ukrainian President Volodymyr Zelenskyy said that, "China has chosen the policy of staying away. At the moment, Ukraine is satisfied with this policy."

Ukrainian president Volodymyr Zelenskyy said that, "without the Chinese market for the Russian Federation, Russia would be feeling complete economic isolation. That's something that China can do – to limit the trade [with Russia] until the war is over." In April 2023, Xi and Zelenskyy held their first direct talks about the war.

An opinion poll conducted in February–March 2023 by the Razumkov Centre showed that 60% of Ukrainians surveyed had a negative view of China. Another Razumkov Centre poll conducted from 19 to 25 January 2024, had 72.5% of Ukrainian respondents expressing a negative view of China, which was only less than 3 other countries: Iran (82%), Belarus (87%), and Russia (95%). 64% expressed a negative view of Xi Jinping in the 2024 poll.

In June 2024, Zelenskyy said China's support for Russia would prolong the war and accused Russia of using Chinese diplomats as part of its efforts to undermine the Ukraine peace summit in Switzerland. China's Foreign Ministry said the country was not against the peace summit and did not exert pressure on other countries.

In April 2025, Zelenskyy summoned the Chinese ambassador in Kyiv after Chinese nationals were captured fighting in eastern Ukraine. Zelenskyy stated that over 150 Chinese nationals were fighting on Russia's side in Ukraine. The SBU released an interrogation video of one of the Chinese nationals captured by Ukrainian soldiers. Zelenskyy subsequently stated that China was supplying Russia with gunpowder and artillery. In May 2025, Oleh Ivashchenko stated that China has supplied "tooling machines, special chemical products, gunpowder, and components specifically to defence manufacturing industries" to 20 Russian factories.

In September 2025, Zelenskyy argued that China had the leverage to force Russia to end the invasion—"without China, Putin's Russia is nothing"—but that China had too often remained silent instead of acting for peace.

==== Sanctions against China ====
In April 2025, Ukraine imposed sanctions on three Chinese companies that it alleges are involved in the production of 9K720 Iskander missiles. In July 2025, Ukraine sanctioned five Chinese companies accused of supplying drone components to Russian Shahed-type drones.

== International commentary and analysis ==
The Economist has stated that China's professed neutrality is "in reality a pro-Russian pseudo-neutrality". Mark Leonard of the European Council on Foreign Relations has stated that "for China, the war in Ukraine simply isn't that important", adding that the war is seen "not as a cataclysmic war that's reshaping the global order, but as a proxy conflict".

Joseph Torigian of the American University described the Chinese government's position on the invasion as a "balancing act", stating that "the governments of both countries hold similarly negative views about America's role in Europe and Asia", but that China would not be willing to put its financial interests at risk to support Russia, especially given that China was "trying to preserve its reputation as a responsible stakeholder". Ryan Hass of the Brookings Institution has argued that "without Russia, the thinking goes, China would be alone to deal with a hostile west determined to obstruct China's rise", but that the two countries "do not have perfectly aligned interests. China has a lot more to lose than Russia. China sees itself as a country on the rise with momentum behind it. Russia is essentially fighting the tides of decline."

Several commentators have foreseen a potential role for China as a key mediator in the conflict. Érick Duchesne of the Université Laval has argued that "strategic ambiguity on the part of China could have a beneficial effect and help untie the Gordian knot of the crisis" and that it would be a "a serious mistake" for NATO countries to oppose Chinese mediation. Zeno Leoni of King's College London argued that "should China lead parties involved to a new peace, it would be a major diplomatic and public relations victory for Beijing", as the Chinese government "would be able to present itself as a responsible great power and to convince the west that in future they might have to rely on Beijing's global influence at a time when US influence is declining".

A 2025 sentiment analysis of Chinese Ministry of Foreign Affairs statements on the war suggest a "generally neutral stance, with pro-Russia sentiment peaking during geopolitical tensions."

In 2026, several media outlets and analysts argued that the war had further deepened Russia's economic and diplomatic dependence on China. Reuters described the two countries' "no limits" partnership as having strengthened since the start of the invasion, while commentators increasingly characterised the relationship as asymmetrical in China's favour. Some Western commentators and analysts have questioned China's claims of neutrality in the Russo-Ukrainian War. Reuters reported that China has maintained close economic and diplomatic ties with Russia despite the war.

Commentators additionally linked the proposed Power of Siberia 2 gas pipeline to the geopolitical consequences of the war. Reuters and other outlets reported that the project became strategically important for Russia following the loss of much of its European gas market, while analysts viewed China's cautious approach toward approving the pipeline as evidence of Beijing's stronger negotiating position in its relationship with Moscow.

== See also ==
- Foreign involvement in the Russian invasion of Ukraine
- India and the Russian invasion of Ukraine
- Iran and the Russo-Ukrainian war (2022–present)
- Taiwan and the Russian invasion of Ukraine
- United Kingdom and the Russian invasion of Ukraine
- United States and the Russian invasion of Ukraine
