= Energy blackmail =

Strategic manipulation of energy resources for political or economic gain

Energy blackmail is, as defined by the Danish Institute for International Studies (DIIS), a strategic manipulation of energy resources for political or economic gain. It involves primarily oil and natural gas, but also potentially other fuels such as nuclear fuel. Energy blackmail can serve as a potential alternative offensive strategy that is cheaper than military intervention. Energy blackmail has been used by countries to leverage their energy resources for decades, but the term was popularised after the Russian invasion of Ukraine in 2022 to refer to Russian statements and actions in respect to its relationship with other states and with the European Union (EU). However, energy blackmail does not only impact the importing countries, but rather creates reciprocal harm to the political-economic states of both countries involved.

== History ==
In 1960, OPEC was founded in Baghdad by Iraq, Iran, Kuwait, Saudi Arabia and Venezuela, as a cartel to fix the price of oil on the world market. In 1973 OPEC imposed an embargo on the United States and other countries that supported Israel during the Yom Kippur War, including Netherlands, Portugal, and South Africa. With the help of American proliferation aid, Israel was able to halt Egyptian and Syrian forces that were receiving support from the Soviet Union. As a result of Israel's new resources, OPEC member nations imposed the embargo to disincentivize the US from continuing aid to Israel. After physical warfare ended because of ceasefire, the embargo continued shortly after causing further damage to the US energy sector. The oil embargo increased the price of oil from $2.90 to $11.65 US dollars per barrel.

== Russia ==
Russia has a notable history of using energy blackmail, especially towards the EU and most recently Ukraine. Russia is one of the largest oil exporters, producing 11% of the words oil as of 2023, just behind the United States and Saudi Arabia. The EU imports 54% of Russia's oil, making them Russia's biggest buyer. However, Russia and the EU have developed a codependent relationship, making the threat of energy blackmail from Russia highly contentious. Russia's advantage over the EU lies in NATO, in that their relationship could jeopardize the integrity and honor of the NATO alliance if the EU is affiliated and reliant on Russia for energy.

Further, the energy sector of Russia is largely owned and controlled by the government, making it a useful tool for political coercion. One of the leading companies Gazprom, claims to be an independent entity even though the government owns 51% of the company. Because of this, Gazprom may be viewed to be a political asset to the Kremlin who have utilized energy as a weapon beginning with the natural gas shut-offs to Ukraine with the first one in 2006.

In May 2023, the European Commissioner for Energy Kadri Simson said that Russian President Vladimir Putin's energy blackmail of Europe had failed.

In December 2024, Volodymyr Zelenskyy, the president of Ukraine, accused Robert Fico, the prime minister of Slovakia of opening "a second front" against Ukraine on Putin's orders, in response to Robert Fico's threats to cut off electricity from Slovakia to Ukraine. Robert Fico threatened to cut off energy supplies after Ukraine refused to renew the deal with Russia regarding transport of gas to European Union countries through Ukrainian territory.

In January 2025, the Moldovan government accused Russia of blackmail in regards to gas supplies to the unrecognized breakaway state of Transnistria in its territory, arguing that Russia sought to provoke an energy crisis that would undermine Moldova's pro-Western policies at the time of the 2025 Moldovan parliamentary election later that year. Russia denied the allegations.

== Others ==
In 2017, the United States pressured China and other members of the United Nations Security Council to end oil shipments to North Korea in an effort to stop them from continuing their ICBM programme. In 2024 the United States and South Korea established a task force to block North Korea from acquiring oil.

== See also ==
- 2022–2023 Russia–European Union gas dispute
- Energy crisis
- International sanctions against North Korea
- 1973 oil crisis
- Moldova and the Russo-Ukrainian War
