= Hillway Culture =

Hong Kong independent bookstore and publisher

Hillway Culture 山道文化
- Status: Active
- Founded: 2016; 10 years ago
- Founder: Raymond Yeung
- Country of origin: Hong Kong
- Headquarters location: Mong Kok, Kowloon, Hong Kong
- Publication types: Books
- Official website: www.hillway.com.hk

Hillway Culture is an independent bookstore and publishing house in Hong Kong. It was co-founded in 2016 by Raymond Yeung and his partners. Yeung is a former liberal studies teacher from Diocesan Girls' School who was ruptured by police projectiles, which permanently affected his eyesight in the 12 June 2019 Hong Kong protest.

== 2021 security law complaints ==
2021 Hong Kong Book Fair was the first it has been held since the national security law officially promulgated by the Hong Kong Government on 30 June 2020. The organiser HKTDC reminded the vendor to ensure all the books they sold were in compliance with the law. However, Hillway Culture received complaints of suspected national security violations, including a bilingual (Cantonese and English) version of George Orwell’s Animal Farm.
