= Joseph Torigian =

American academic

Joseph Torigian is Provost Associate Professor at the School of International Service at American University. He is a senior fellow for Asia Studies at the Council on Foreign Relations and a center associate of the Lieberthal-Rogel Center for Chinese Studies at the University of Michigan.

== Books ==
- Prestige, Manipulation, and Coercion: Elite Power Struggles in the Soviet Union and China after Stalin and Mao (Yale University Press, 2022)
- The Party’s Interests Come First: The Life of Xi Zhongxun, Father of Xi Jinping (Stanford University Press, 2025)
