= Simon Shen =

Hong Kong political scientist (born 1978)

Simon Shen Xuhui
- 沈旭暉
- Born: British Hong Kong

Education
- Education: Queen's College; Yale University (BA, MA); University of Oxford (DPhil)
- Doctoral advisor: Rana Mitter

Philosophical work
- Institutions: Chinese University of Hong Kong; Hong Kong Institute of Education; National Sun Yat-sen University
- Main interests: Chinese foreign policy Chinese nationalism International politics

Simon Xu Hui Shen (Chinese: 沈旭暉) is a Hong Kong political scientist and columnist.

== Education ==
Shen was educated at the Queen's College and graduated from the Yale University in 2000 with bachelor's degrees in Political Science and History and later master's in Political Science. He obtained a doctoral degree from the Department of Politics and International Relations, University of Oxford in 2006. His thesis is titled "A New Stability in China's Internal and External Affairs? Reinventing Chinese Nationalism in Sino-American Relations (1999-2003)".

== Career ==
Shen joined Chinese University of Hong Kong (CUHK) in 2003 and became research assistant professor in the Hong Kong Institute of Asia-Pacific Studies of the same university. In 2009, he was invited by Anthony Cheung, then President of Hong Kong Institute of Education (now Education University of Hong Kong) to its Faculty of Arts and Sciences. He returned to CUHK in 2012.

He held visiting positions in Brookings Institution, University of Warwick and National University of Singapore.

In 2016, he left his hometown. Within three years, he returned to Hong Kong but has since then left again in exile in the wake of the implementation of the national security law in 2020. Shen also served as the coordinator of the Taiwan-based Hong Kong news outlet Commons.

== Works ==
Books

- Conflict and Cooperation in Sino-US Relations: Change & Continuity, Causes & Cures. Routledge. 2015. (Co-edited with Jean-Marc Blanchard)
- China and the World (Vol. I – VIII). Sage. 2014. (Co-edited with Shaun Breslin and Carla Freeman)
- Multi-dimensional Diplomacy of Contemporary China. Rowman & Littlefield. 2010. (Co-edited with Jean-Marc Blanchard)
- Online Chinese Nationalism and China's Bilateral Relations. Rowman & Littlefield. 2010. (Co-edited with Shaun Breslin)
- Redefining Nationalism in Modern China: Sino-American Relations and the Emergence of Chinese Public Opinions in the 21st Century. Palgrave Macmillan. 2007.
