= Lithuania and the Russo-Ukrainian war =

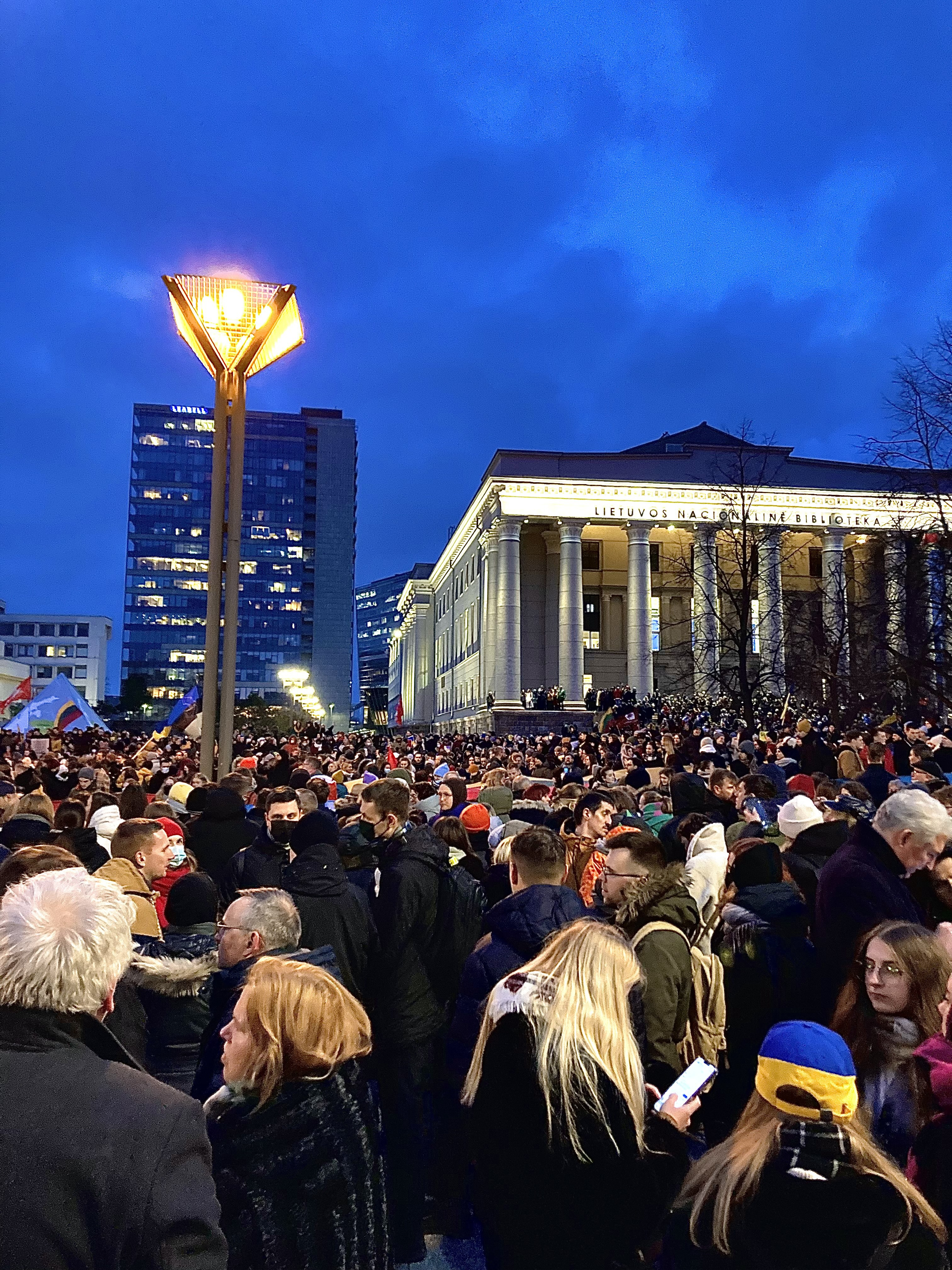
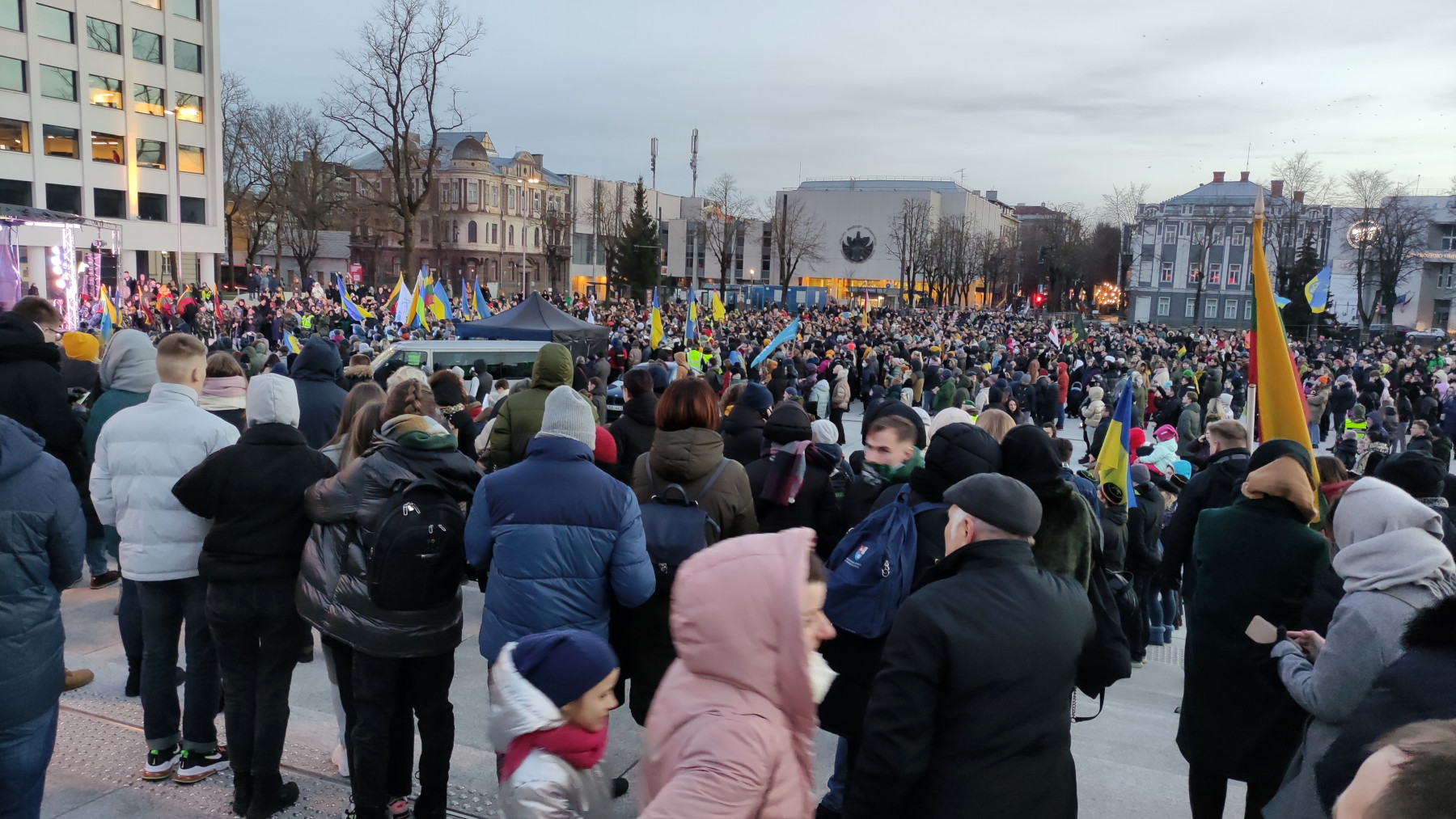
Demonstrations condemning the invasion and expressing the support for Ukraine. Vilnius (top) and Kaunas (bottom), 24 February 2022.

On 24 February 2022, the Lithuanian authorities declared a state of emergency in the country due to the Russian invasion of Ukraine. Lithuanian President Gitanas Nauseda said that he condemned the aggression of the Russian Federation against Ukraine, and also said that after Russia started a war against Ukraine, NATO should clearly state that Russia is a serious threat to Euro-Atlantic security. He provided military and humanitarian aid to Ukraine, and sanctioned Russia and Belarus, the two countries most involved in invading Ukraine.

== Background ==
In the prelude of invasion, on 13 February 2022, Lithuania sent FIM-92 Stinger anti-aircraft missile systems and ammunition to Ukraine.

The day before the invasion, on 23 February, a meeting was held in Kyiv between the presidents of Lithuania, Poland and Ukraine as part of the Lublin Triangle. The President of Lithuania, Gitanas Nauseda, expressed support for Ukraine from the Lithuanian side, saying that Ukraine will not be left alone with the threat.

== During the Russian invasion of Ukraine (2022) ==
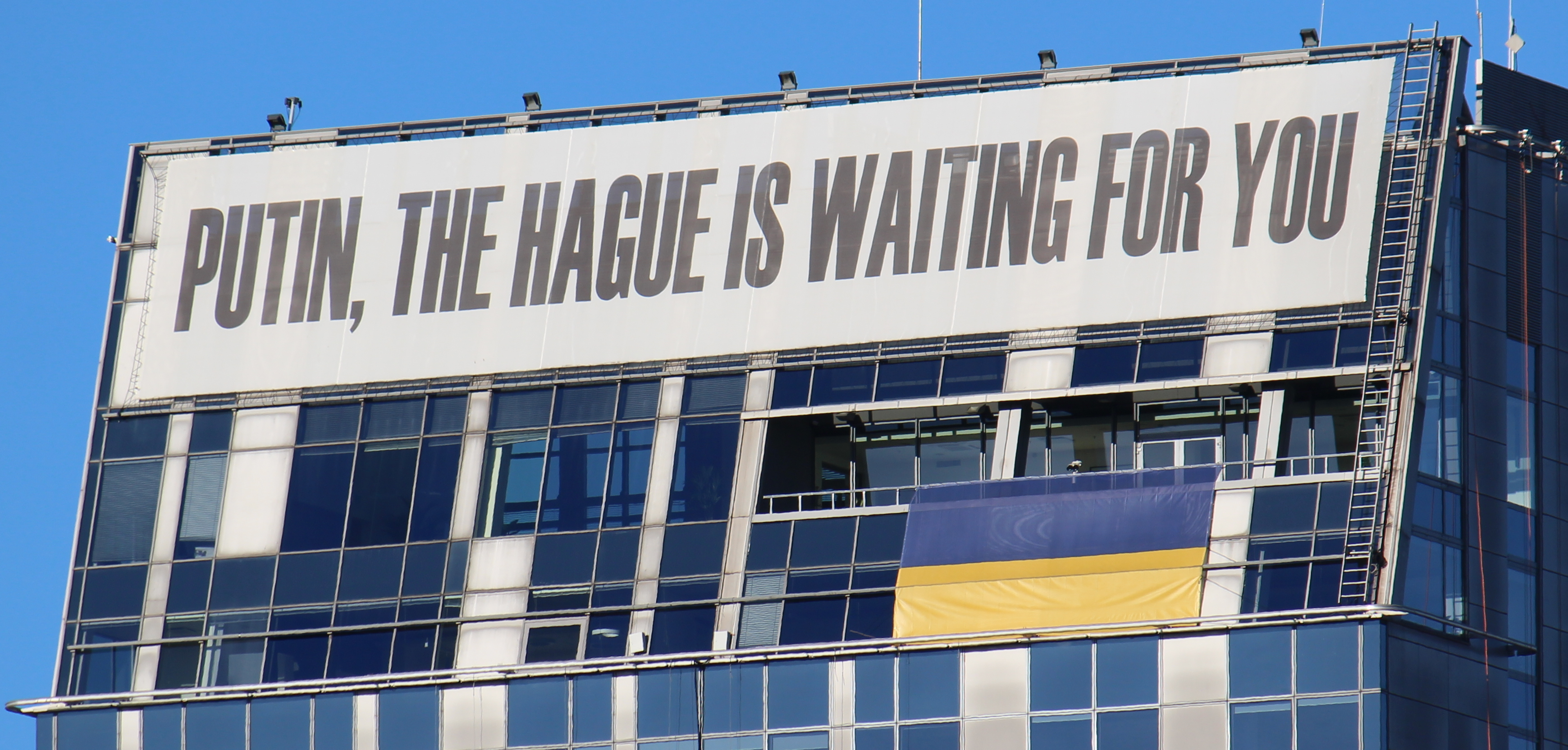
Message on the Vilnius City Municipality building

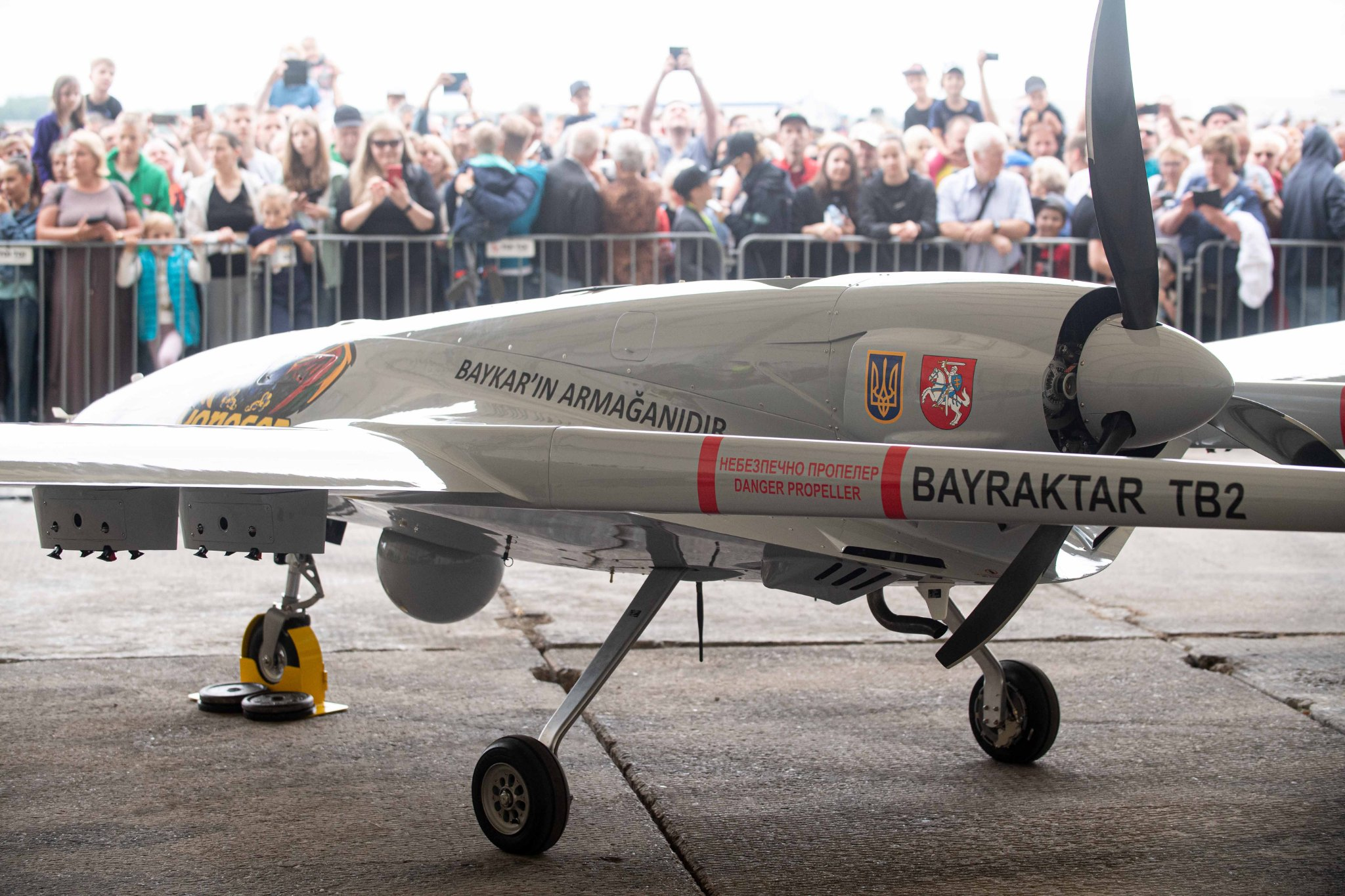
Bayraktar TB2 combat drone, crowdfunded by Lithuanians

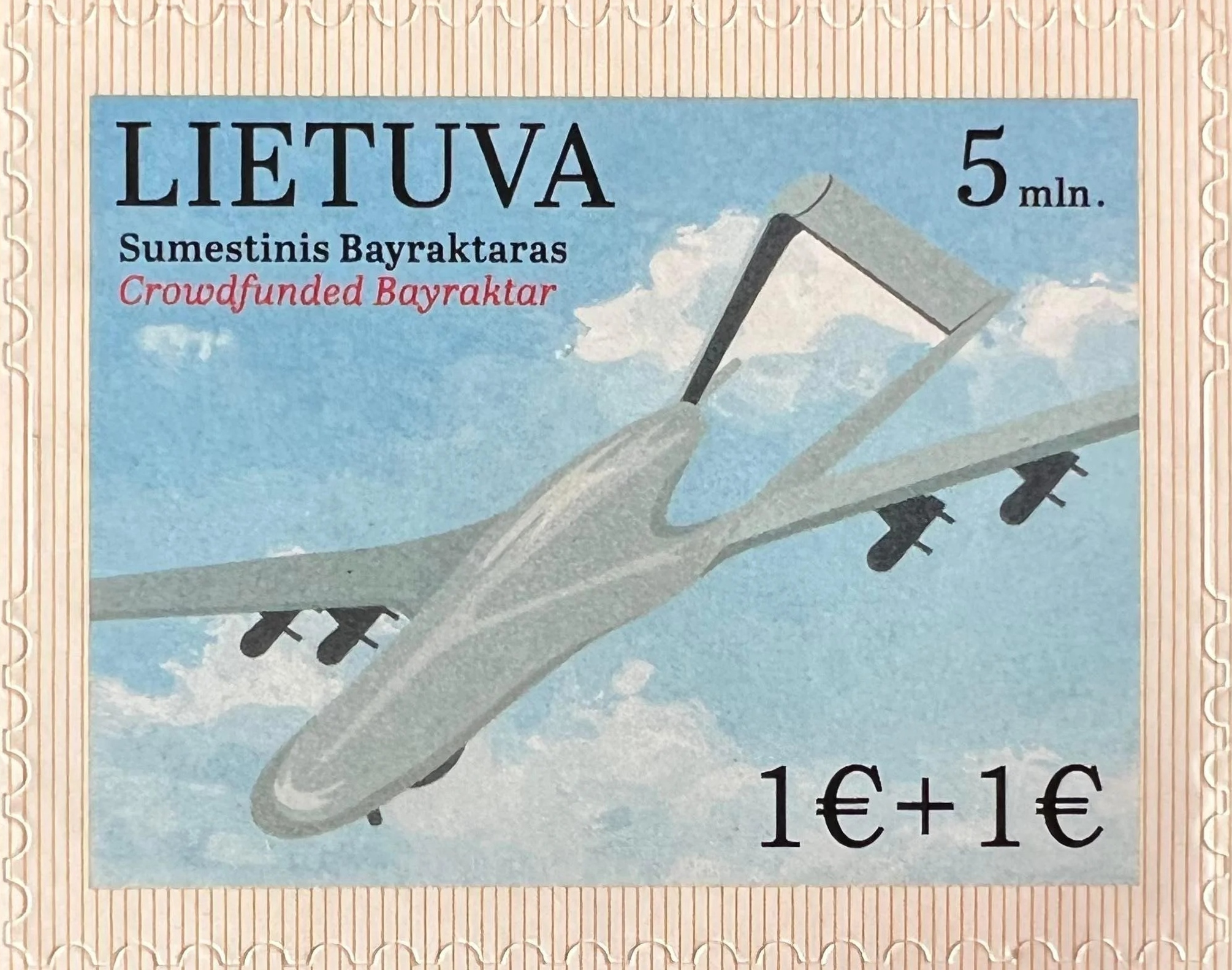
Postage stamp of Lithuania commemorating the end of crowdfunding on Bayraktar TB2

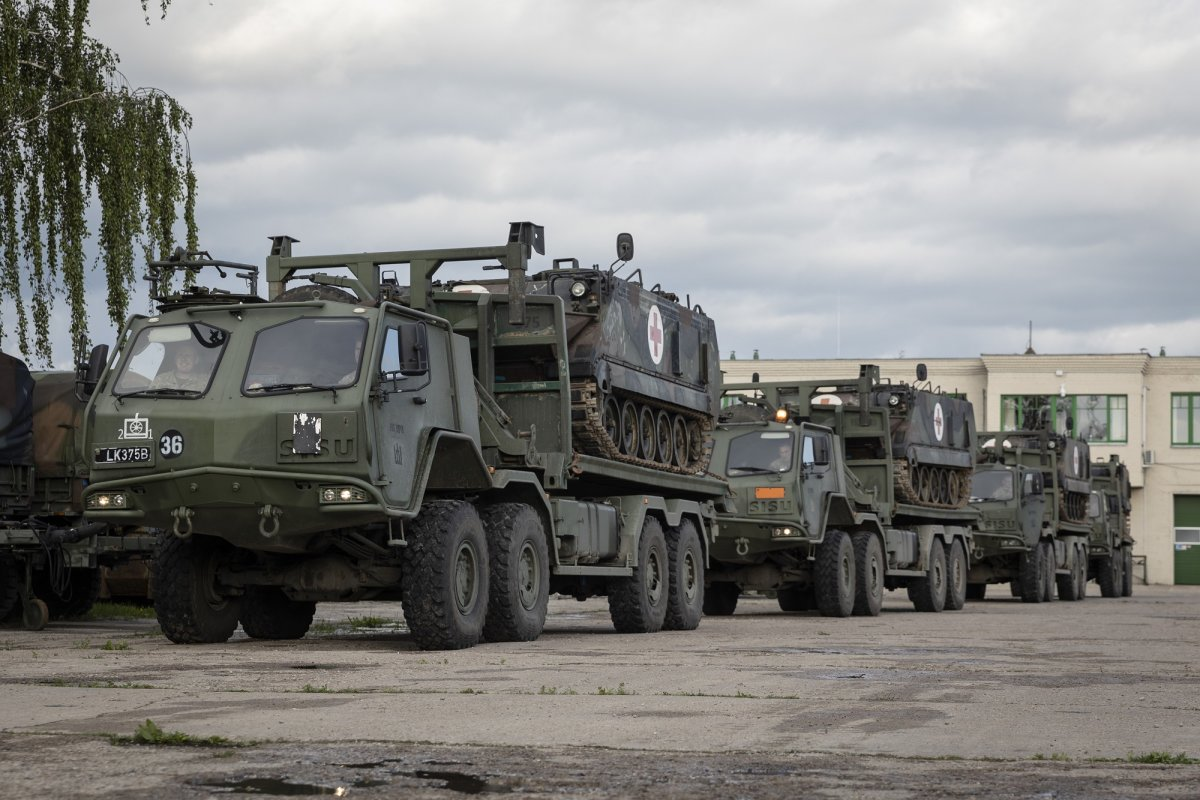
Lithuanian military aid package being sent to Ukraine, June 2022

During the Russian invasion of Ukraine, on 24 February 2022, a state of emergency was declared in Lithuania. On the same day, Nauseda recorded an appeal to the citizens of the Russian Federation:

I appeal to all the people of Russia.

Your leaders have unilaterally decided to attack a neighboring country. To a country that has close historical and cultural ties with Russia. The people you call your brothers and sisters.

Nobody wants this war. Neither Russians, nor Ukrainians, nor the rest of the world.

It's not too late to stop this crime. It is not too late to prevent the death of thousands of innocent people. You can still avoid senseless casualties on both sides of the front.

In a song well known to all of us, it is said that the soldiers died in that war, so that the people of the whole earth could sleep peacefully at night. But now your country is starting a new war, the consequences of which are unknown to anyone. Do Russians want wars? I want to believe not.

Do not be silent! Don't close your eyes to injustice! Be bold and decisive!

On 24 February Defense Minister Arvydas Anušauskas announced that, following the example of other NATO countries, Lithuania evacuated 40 of its military instructors from Ukraine who were training the Ukrainian military to use Stinger man-portable air defense systems from the batch transferred to Ukraine on 13 February. On 25 February rallies in support of Ukraine were held in many large cities of Lithuania under the general title “Freedom Shines”. People walked along the main streets of Vilnius, gathered near the Seimas and in the square to them. Boris Nemtsov at the Russian embassy.

A number of Lithuanian online publications (LRT.lt, Delfi.lt, 15min.lt, Lrytas.lt, tv3.lt, VE.lt, Kaunas.kasvyksta.lt, Madeinvilnius.lt, Etaplius.lt) expressed their solidarity with Ukrainian journalists and editors working at the front, and inform them of their readiness to help. On the same day, the rebroadcasting of the Russian state-owned TV channels RTR Planeta, Rossiya 24, NTV Mir, and Belarusian Belarus 24 (for five years), RBC and TVCI (for three years) were banned in Lithuania. Klaipeda radio station "Rainbow" also expressed solidarity by stopping broadcasting any Russian products.

On 4 April 2022, Lithuania decided to downgrade diplomatic relations with Russia "in response to Russia's military aggression against sovereign Ukraine and the atrocities committed by the Russian armed forces in various occupied Ukrainian cities, including the heinous massacre in Bucha." Lithuania expels the Russian ambassador, recalls its ambassador and closes the Russian consulate in Klaipeda.

On 10 May, the Seimas of Lithuania, noting that the Russian military "deliberately and systematically choose civilian targets for bombing," recognized Russia as a "state supporting and carrying out terrorism," and its military actions against Ukraine - genocide of the Ukrainian people.

In September 2022, Poland, Lithuania, Latvia, and Estonia decided to close entry for Russian citizens with Schengen visas, including those issued by third countries. In 2022, around 4,000 Russian citizens applied for a residence permit in Lithuania, while 38 had their permanent residence permit revoked over security concerns.

Military aid further continued and, according to the Lithuanian Minister of National Defence, as of 21 November 2022, the total aid to Ukraine amounted to €660 million, of which the military aid was €240 million.

In December 2022, diplomatic relations between Lithuania and Russia were downgraded to the level of acting chargé d'affaires after the Russian ambassador was expelled and the Lithuanian ambassador recalled.

In August 2023, following a survey, Lithuania announced that 254 Russian and 910 Belarusian citizens living in Lithuania posed a threat to national security and that their residence permits will be revoked.

In September 2023, following the new explanation of the EU sanctions by the European Commission, Lithuania together with the other Baltic States and Finland banned the vehicles with the Russian license plates from entering their territory.

In April 2024, the Lithuanian government considered repatriating Ukrainian men of military age living in Lithuania to Ukraine to be drafted into the Ukrainian army. Lithuanian President Gitanas Nausėda, Prime Minister Ingrida Šimonytė and Defence Minister Laurynas Kasčiūnas voiced support for the repatriation of military-age Ukrainian men to Ukraine.

In October 2024, Lithuania denounced several treaties with Russia and Belarus, including a treaty on double taxation of income and a treaty on legal assistance.

In 2024, a survey suggested that 70% of Lithuanians think that Russia poses a real threat.

After a heated meeting between US President Trump and President Zelenskyy at the White House, Prime Minister Gintautas Paluckas and President Gitanas Nausėda voiced their support for Ukraine.

On 29 September 2025, Inga Ruginienė spoke by phone with Ukrainian Prime Minister Yuliia Svyrydenko. Ruginienė said that Lithuania's support for Ukraine will continue and include not only military and financial aid, but also humanitarian help. The two leaders also agreed to meet soon in Kyiv.

Ruginienė alongside her Government delegation visited Kyiv on October 6, 2025, where they met with Ukrainian President Volodymyr Zelenskyy, Prime Minister Yulia Svyrydenko, and Chairman of the Verkhovna Rada Ruslan Stefanchuk.

Olha Nikitchenko, the Ukrainian Ambassador to Lithuania met with Prime Minister Inga Ruginienė on the 24 October 2025. The Prime Minister expressed her gratitude for the warm and productive visit to Kyiv earlier this month, emphasising the relevance of the issues discussed and Lithuania's determination to turn them into tangible examples of success. Lithuanian Prime Minister Inga Ruginienė hosted Ukrainian Prime Minister Yuliia Svyrydenko and members of the Ukrainian government in Vilnius for high-level discussions focused on bilateral cooperation, European security, and civil preparedness. The meeting underscored Lithuania’s continued support for Ukraine amid Russia’s ongoing invasion and highlighted growing cooperation between the two countries in resilience and defence matters.

During the visit, Lithuania and Ukraine signed a Joint Declaration on state resilience and civil preparedness, aimed at strengthening cooperation in crisis management, civil defence, societal resilience, and responses to hybrid threats. The agreement reflected Lithuania’s efforts to draw from Ukraine’s wartime experience in strengthening national preparedness and public resilience systems.

Ruginienė stated that Ukraine’s experience, resilience, and innovation offered “invaluable lessons for Europe,” emphasising that European peace and security were currently being defended in Ukraine. She additionally reiterated Lithuania’s position that increased military, political, and economic support for Ukraine, alongside greater pressure on Russia, remained necessary.

The discussions in Vilnius also covered continued assistance for Ukraine, reconstruction cooperation, sanctions policy, and regional security coordination between the Baltic states and Ukraine.

=== Proposal to cancel the recognition of the independence of the Republic of Lithuania ===
On 8 June, the United Russia deputy Yevgeny Fedorov submitted a bill to State Duma of Russia to cancel the resolution of the USSR State Council "On the recognition of the independence of the Republic of Lithuania" of 6 September 1991. Fedorov substantiates such a proposal by the fact that the USSR law "On the procedure for resolving issues related to the secession of a union republic was not according to the USSR constitution.

Lithuanian officials called the proposal absurd, pointing out that the Soviet occupation was illegal in the first place, Lithuania claimed state continuity and that the USSR actually recognized it, including the recognition of the Lithuanian state established in 1918.

=== Restriction of transit communication with the Kaliningrad region ===
In response to the proposal to cancel the recognition of Lithuanian independence, on 18 June, the Lithuanian side introduced a ban on transit cargo transportation between the Russian Kaliningrad Oblast and the rest of Russia through the territory of Lithuania, covering goods subject to European Union sanctions imposed on Russia for its invasion of Ukraine . The restrictions came into force on 18 June 2022 and led to a ban on the transit of coal, metals, cement, timber, building materials and high-tech products through the Lithuanian territory by rail.

On 21 June, restrictions were extended to trucks. A number of media called the measures taken by Lithuania "the blockade of Kaliningrad", prompting a response from Lithuanian Prime Minister Ingrida Simonyte, who emphasized that there was no question of a blockade and restrictions were imposed only on the movement of goods subject to EU sanctions. According to the governor of the Kaliningrad region Anton Alikhanov, 40-50% of all cargo was banned.

In response to the restrictions, Russia began to openly threaten Lithuania and even issue ultimatums. The head of the Lithuanian Foreign Ministry, Gabrielius Landsbergis, said that the ban on the transit of steel and ferrous metal products between the main territory of Russia and Kaliningrad Oblast of the Russian Federation through Lithuania is not a decision of Lithuania, but EU sanctions against Russia.

On 13 July, EU representatives announced that Russia was allowed to transit goods subject to sanctions through the countries of the European Union by rail. This means that Russia can transit sanctioned goods to Kaliningrad via Lithuania and Poland. MEP Andrius Kubilius calls such a step extremely dangerous - the Kremlin, feeling that it can put pressure on the EC, is unlikely to stop and can only demand even greater concessions. Lithuanian Prime Minister Ingrida Simonyte said that the Lithuanian side does not agree with this decision, but cannot oppose anything to the European Commission.
