= Taiwan and the Russo-Ukrainian war =

Locations of Taiwan and Ukraine.

Russia's invasion of Ukraine provoked several strong reactions and public statements from many Taiwanese politicians and political parties, as well as discussions among the public about how the conflict could influence China's subsequent actions against Taiwan. Many members of the Pan-Blue Coalition began to question the depth of the United States' support for Taiwan in the event of a potential invasion by China, resulting in them generally being criticized.

== Official reactions ==
Then-Taiwanese President Tsai Ing-wen and Kaohsiung Mayor Chan Chi-mai posted public statements on Facebook urging Taiwanese citizens to "Stand With Ukraine" in solidarity with their losses during the war.

The Taiwanese Ministry of Foreign Affairs urgently launched an evacuation plan for Taiwanese citizens still in Ukraine, and helped eighteen overseas Taiwanese citizens escape to Poland on 24 February 2022.

== Reactions from political parties ==
=== Kuomintang ===
Jaw Shaw-kong, a member of the Kuomintang, made a public statement on Facebook stating that a lesson that should be learned from the onset of the conflict was that small countries like Taiwan should not stimulate big countries, which attracted criticism. Newscaster Zhang Yaqin called the statement unacceptable, and said that if Taiwan was controlled by people who followed what mainland China told them to do, Taiwan would become another Ukraine.

=== Democratic Progressive Party ===
In March 2022, Governor of Kaohsiung Weng Zhangliang announced that he would donate one month's worth of his income to support the Ukrainian people.

=== New Power Party ===
The New Power Party issued a statement on February 25, 2022, condemning Russia, describing the incident as an unjustified military aggression by Russia against Ukraine, and calling on everyone to speak out for Ukraine. The New Power Party also criticized that some people in the Pan-Blue Coalition took advantage of the conflict to raise theories regarding if the United States was genuinely committed to supporting Taiwan in an attempt to hurt Taiwan–United States relations. The New Power Party stated that such theories were the product of China's information warfare, used in order to attempt to infiltrate and subvert the Taiwanese public.

=== Social Democratic Party ===
Miao Poya, Taipei City Councilor and Social Democratic Party politician, repeatedly posted on Facebook in support of Ukrainian sovergenity and its people.

=== Green Party ===
Taiwan's Green Party issued a statement in support of Ukraine on March 1, 2022, emphasizing their recognition of the values of peace and anti-war philosophy, while criticizing some who raised suspicion towards the United States' commitment to supporting Taiwan regarding Cross-strait relations.

=== Other ===
Bajiong, a YouTuber who discusses the issues of Chinese unification and Taiwanese independence, condemned Taiwanese citizens who stated that Taiwan should avoid the fate of Ukraine by agreeing to unification with no fight if China threatens to invade Taiwan. He expressed that the Taiwanese who advocate for surrender while still enjoying the free and democratic life of Taiwanese policies and the benefits and treatment provided by its government should give up everything in Taiwan now and defect to China. He further stated that even if countries around the world did not provide Taiwan substantial support if conflict arises, Taiwan should still have the determination to defend itself.

== Other politicians ==
In addition to the official positions of political parties, there were also political figures or individual members of political parties whose words and actions resulted in public discussion or criticism.

=== Annette Lu ===
In April 2022, former Taiwanese Vice President Annette Lu released her book entitled "Peace. Justice. Protect Taiwan" (Chinese: "和平．公義．保台灣") which describes the invasion while attempting to show readers the world the cruelty and stupidity of war, while suggesting that there are some people who are proverbially fanning the flames of conflict. Despite this message, no passages in the book condemned Russia, and no passages offered affirmation to Ukrainian President Volodymyr Zelenskyy. As a result, the passage was criticized by some members of the Green Party.

Among them, Green Party politician Huang Pengxiao questioned if, based on her arguments, that those who resisted the Nazis during World War II should also be called destroyers of peace. Huang Pengxiao also questioned her advocacy of theories that show suspicion to the United States' support of Taiwan, arguing that the Chinese Communist Party and the Kuomintang were effectively the same with regards to their approach to Cross-strait relations.

In addition, Annette Lu announced that she would hold a "Peace and Love Taiwan March" in May 2022 to express her anti-war message to Commander-in-Chief Tsai Ing-wen. Taiwanese Representative to Germany Shieh Jhy-wey retorted that the reason why he opposed the war in Ukraine was not to communicate any intentions to Chinese Communist Party leader Xi Jinping, arguing that such conversations were fundamentally between China and Russia. Shieh also stated that such "so-called" pacifists would end up causing the unjust consequences of victims being scrutinized while perpetrators had their deeds covered up.

=== Liang Wenjie ===
On April 8, 2022, Taipei City Councilor Liang Wen-jie posted a picture of the "Free Hong Kong Center" on Facebook, to which a Ukrainian soldier responded by expressing his gratitude to Hong Kong and Taiwan. However, Liang questioned why he should thank Hong Kong, saying "it's weird to thank Hong Kong".

Afterwards, a Hong Kong netizen responded to questions, saying that citizens of Hong Kong had spoken out about the suffering of Ukraine and its citizens and had donated money to Ukraine, while expressing criticism of Liang's remarks. After this, Liang updated his statement, mentioning the disparate attitudes between the Hong Kong government and the Hong Kong people, and apologized to his Hong Kong friends who fought against autocratic aggression and for the good of democracy.

== Public support for Ukraine ==
Taipei 101 was specially lit in the blue and yellow colors of the Ukrainian flag to show solidarity with the nation and people of Ukraine. In addition, at the Kaohsiung Lantern Festival and the Tainan Lantern Festival, the organizers displayed two colors of blue and yellow to represent the colors of the Ukrainian flag.

== See also ==
- Taiwan–Ukraine relations
