= 2026 state visit by Vladimir Putin to China =

2026 meeting between China and Russia's leaders

2026 Visit by Vladimir Putin to China
- Part of China–Russia relations
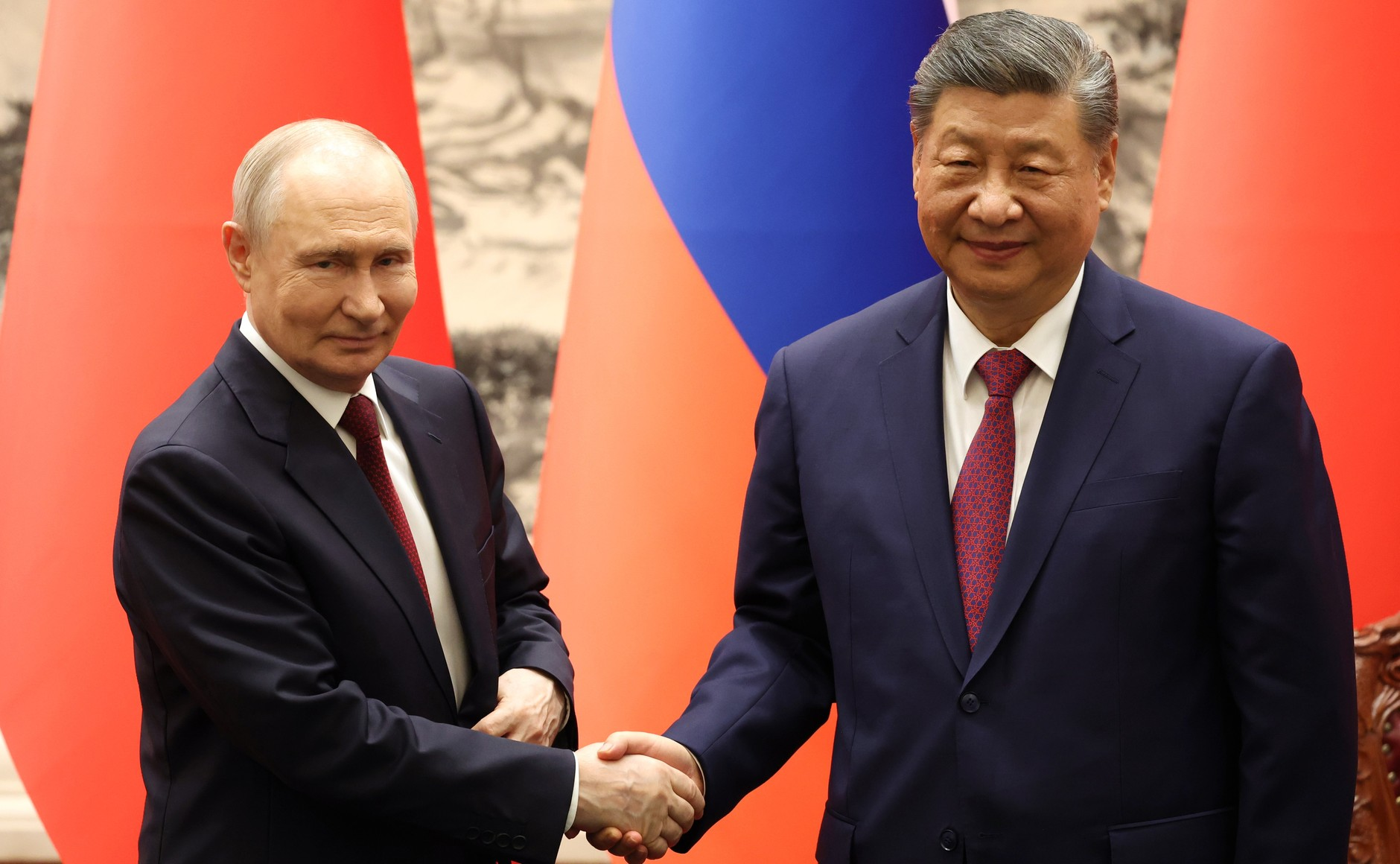
- Russian president Vladimir Putin and Chinese leader Xi Jinping in Beijing on 20 May 2026
- Date: 19–20 May 2026
- Location: Beijing
- Type: State visit
- Participants: Russian president Vladimir Putin; Chinese leader Xi Jinping; CCP chief of staff Cai Qi; Vice Premier Ding Xuexiang; CCP foreign chief Wang Yi

From 19 to 20 May 2026, Vladimir Putin the president of Russia, paid a state visit to China at the invitation of Xi Jinping, the general secretary of the Chinese Communist Party and the president of China. This visit was Putin's 25th visit to China, coinciding with the 30th anniversary of the establishment of the strategic partnership between China and Russia, the 25th anniversary of the signing of the Treaty of Good-Neighborliness and Friendly Cooperation between China and Russia, and the start of the China-Russia Year of Education. Putin met with Xi at the Great Hall of the People, where the two leaders held talks.

== Background ==
The previous meeting between Russian president Vladimir Putin and Chinese leader Xi Jinping took place in September 2025, when they attended the annual summit of the Shanghai Cooperation Organisation in Tianjin, after which Putin visited Beijing to attend the 2025 China Victory Day Parade. Participants in that military parade also included North Korean leader Kim Jong Un and Iranian president Masoud Pezeshkian.

Ahead of his visit, Putin delivered a video address in which he said he was pleased to visit China again at Xi Jinping's invitation. He noted that regular mutual visits and meetings between the Russian and Chinese heads of state constitute an important and indispensable part of the comprehensive development of bilateral relations and of unlocking their truly boundless potential. 2026 marks the 30th anniversary of the establishment of the China–Russia strategic cooperative partnership and the 25th anniversary of the signing of the 2001 Sino-Russian Treaty of Friendship.

Putin's visit meant that, within the span of six months, the leaders of the other four permanent members of the United Nations Security Council all visited China, including French president Emmanuel Macron in December 2025, British prime minister Keir Starmer in January 2026, and the state visit by U.S. president Donald Trump in May 2026.

== Visit ==
=== 19 May ===
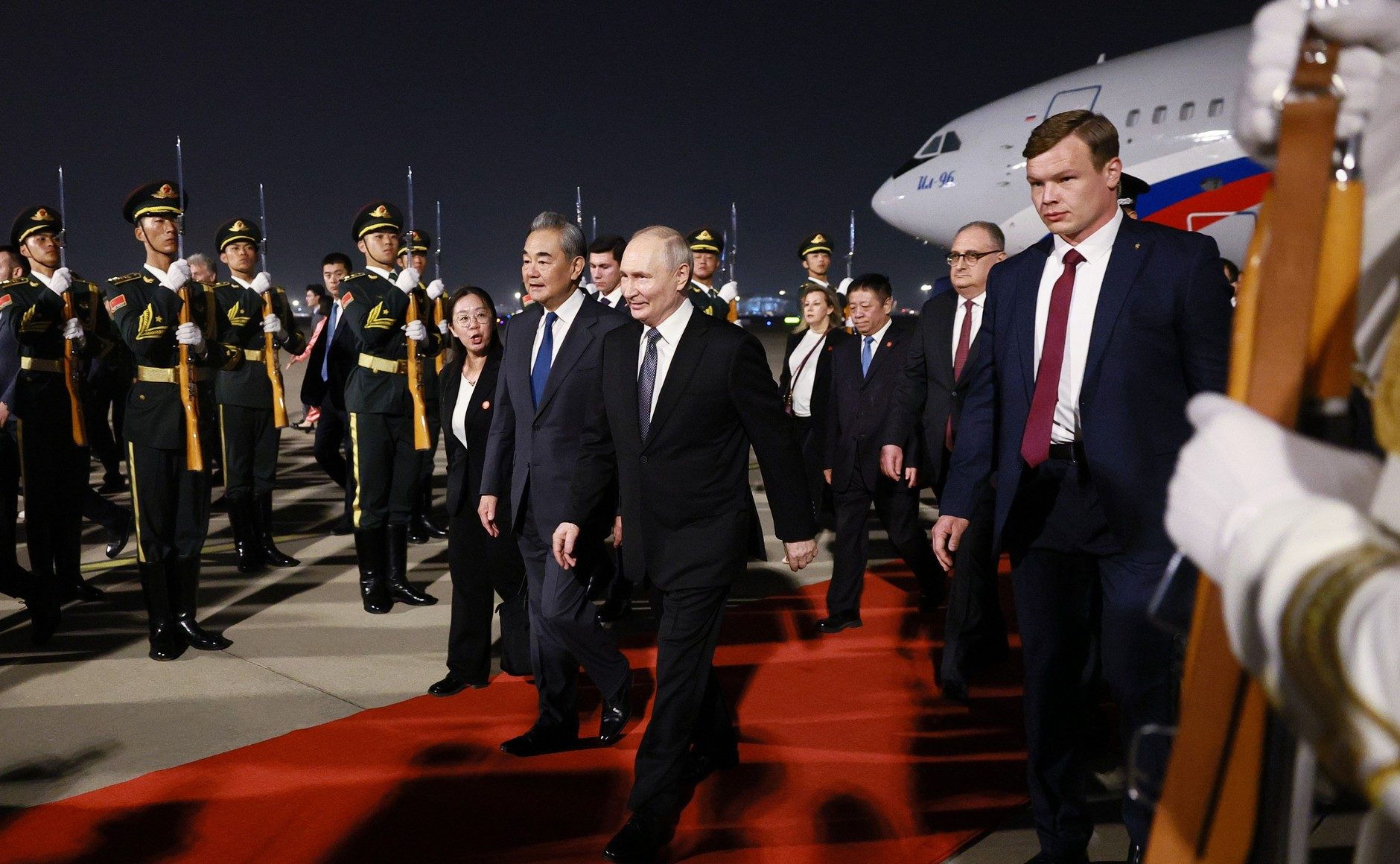
Putin arrived in Beijing and greeted by Chinese foreign minister Wang Yi

On 19 May, Putin's special plane departed from Moscow and arrived in Beijing at 11 p.m. Beijing time. Wang Yi, member of the Politburo of the Chinese Communist Party and Chinese foreign minister, was at the airport to receive him. The Russian delegation that accompanied him consisted of 39 people, including 5 deputy prime ministers, 8 federal ministers, representatives of the presidential administration, heads of state groups, senior executives of large enterprises, and several governors of Russian states.

=== 20 May ===
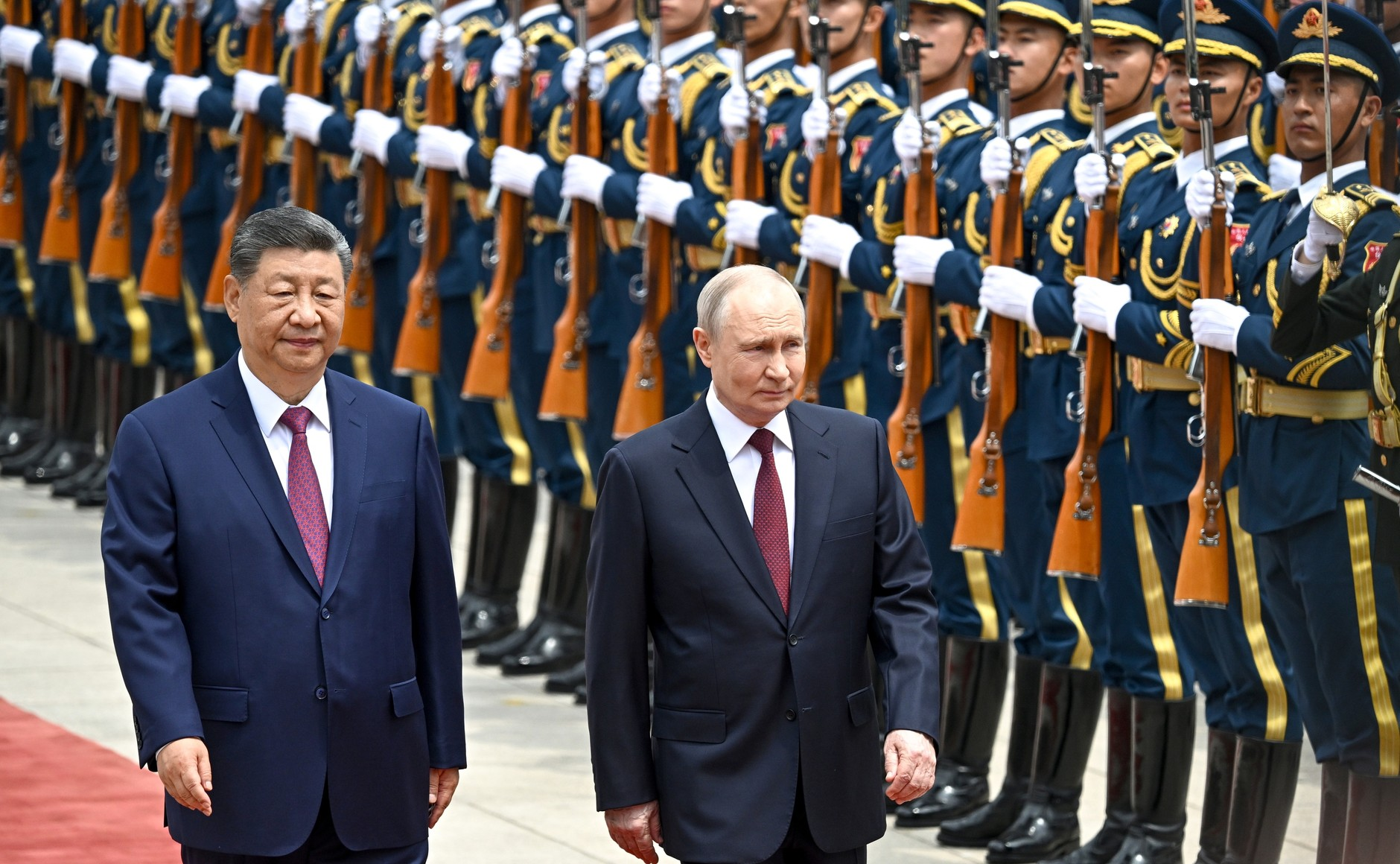
Xi Jinping and Putin inspected the PLA troops at the welcome ceremony

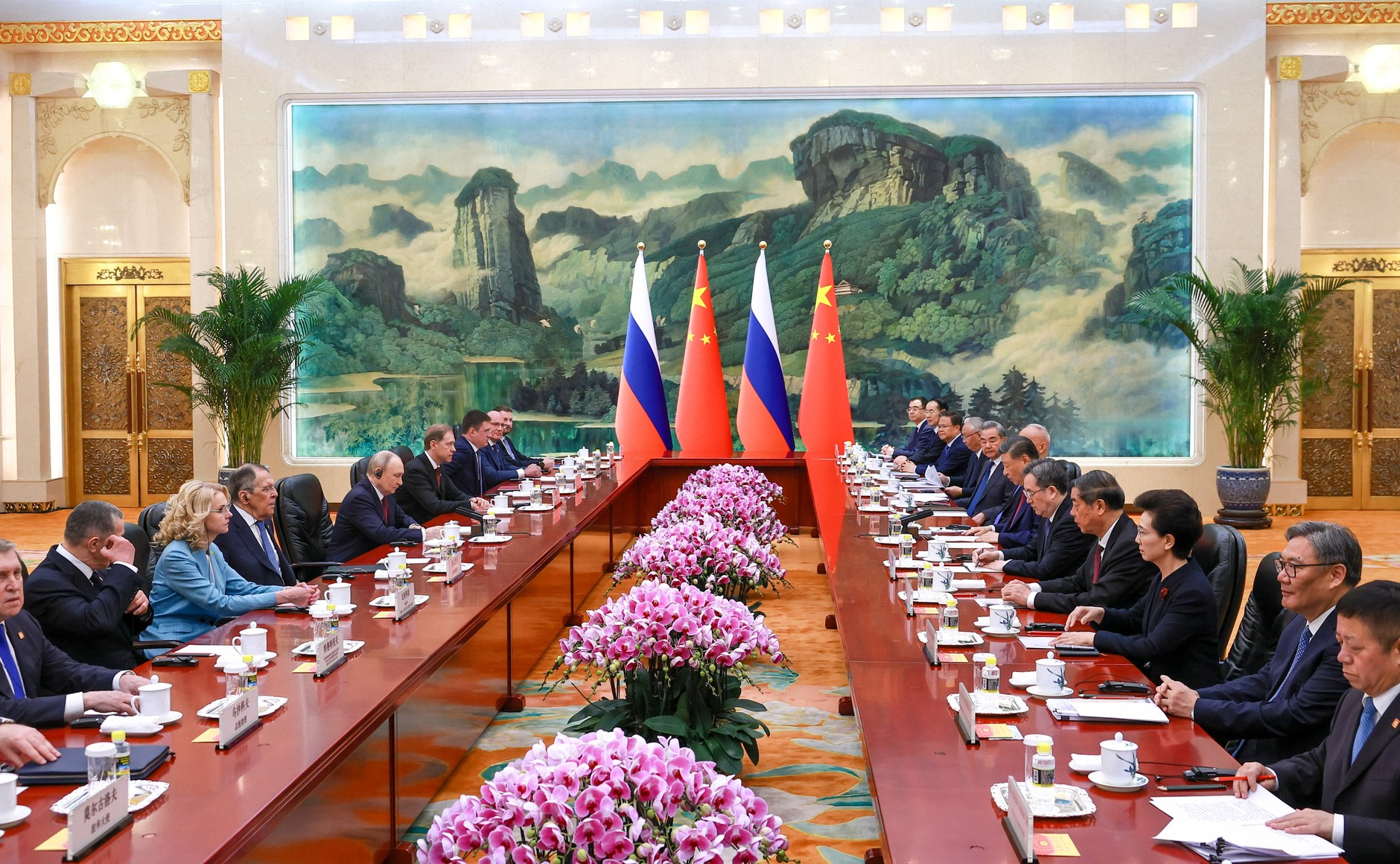
Russia-China held a talk in restricted format

On 20 May morning, Putin arrived at the Great Hall of the People and received a welcome ceremony hosted by Xi Jinping at the East Gate Square. The two heads of state ascended the reviewing stand, and the military band played the national anthems of China and Russia. During the ceremony, Putin and Xi inspected troops of the People's Liberation Army. Afterwards, Xi met with Putin at the Great Hall of the People, and agreed to extend the 2001 Sino-Russian Treaty of Friendship. During this meeting, Xi said that China-Russia relationship have entered the new stage of greater achievements and faster development, and said that they should focus on the development and revitalization goals of the two countries and strengthen the overall planning of all-round cooperation; they should be based on continuing the friendship for generations and strengthen cultural exchanges and cooperation; they should deepen multilateral cooperation and further strengthen the coordination and cooperation of multilateral platforms. In the talks, Xi Jinping mentioned the situation in the Middle East and stated the need of "complete cessation of hostilities" in the region. In addition, he said that "the current international situation is characterized by intertwined turmoil and change, and unilateralism and hegemonic thinking are rampant."

Putin called Xi his "dear friend" and quoted Chinese idiom "not seeing Xi for a day is like being apart for three autumns". He stated that Russia-China relationship had reached "an unprecedented high level". During the meeting, Putin invited Xi to visit Russia in 2027. The two heads of state listened to the reports from the two chairpersons of the cooperation committee at the vice premier level under the framework of the regular meeting mechanism between the Chinese and Russian prime ministers on the progress of cooperation in various fields. During their talks, the two criticized US president Donald Trump’s Golden Dome missile defense system for threatening global stability and said that the United States’ decision to allow the 2010 New START treaty to expire in early 2026 was “irresponsible”. Putin also met with Peng Pai, a Chinese engineer who had studied in Russia, during his visit to China. During Putin's first visit to China as president in 2000, Putin met Peng Pai by chance while he was visiting Beihai Park and took a photo together.

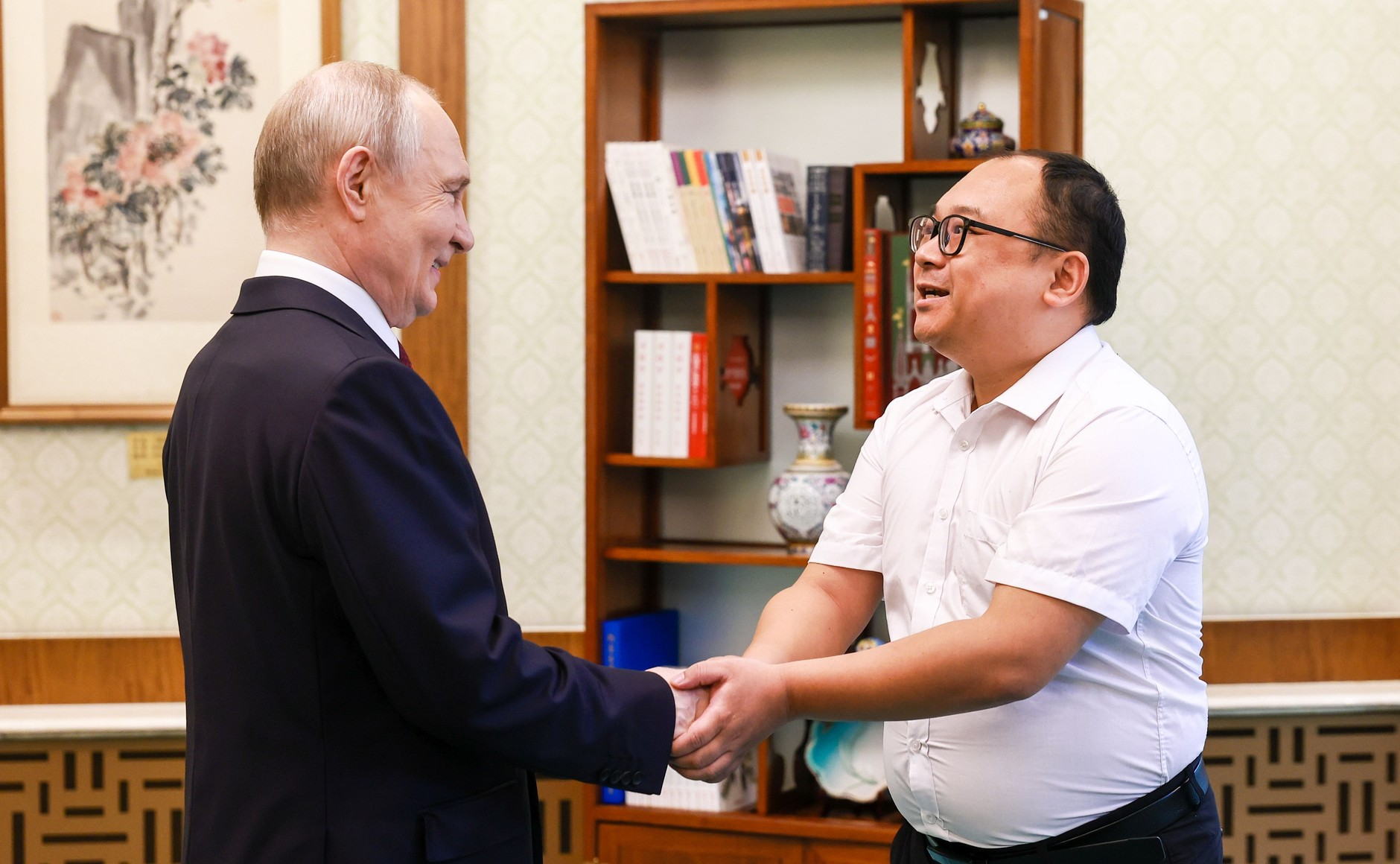
Putin meets with Chinese engineer Peng Pai

In the afternoon, the two leaders signed the Joint Statement between the People's Republic of China and the Russian Federation on Further Strengthening Comprehensive Strategic Coordination and Deepening Good-Neighborly and Friendly Cooperation, and witnessed the signing nearly two dozen agreements in multiple areas. Later, Xi and Putin attended the opening ceremony of the "China-Russia education year". In the evening, Xi hosted the welcome banquet for Putin at the Great Hall of the People. The two leaders also hosted the tea party and visited the photo exhibition titled "Inheriting the Friendship Between China and Russia for Generations and Setting an Example of Great Power Relations" at the same location. Putin left Beijing at the night after he concluded his state visit.

== Analysis and reactions ==
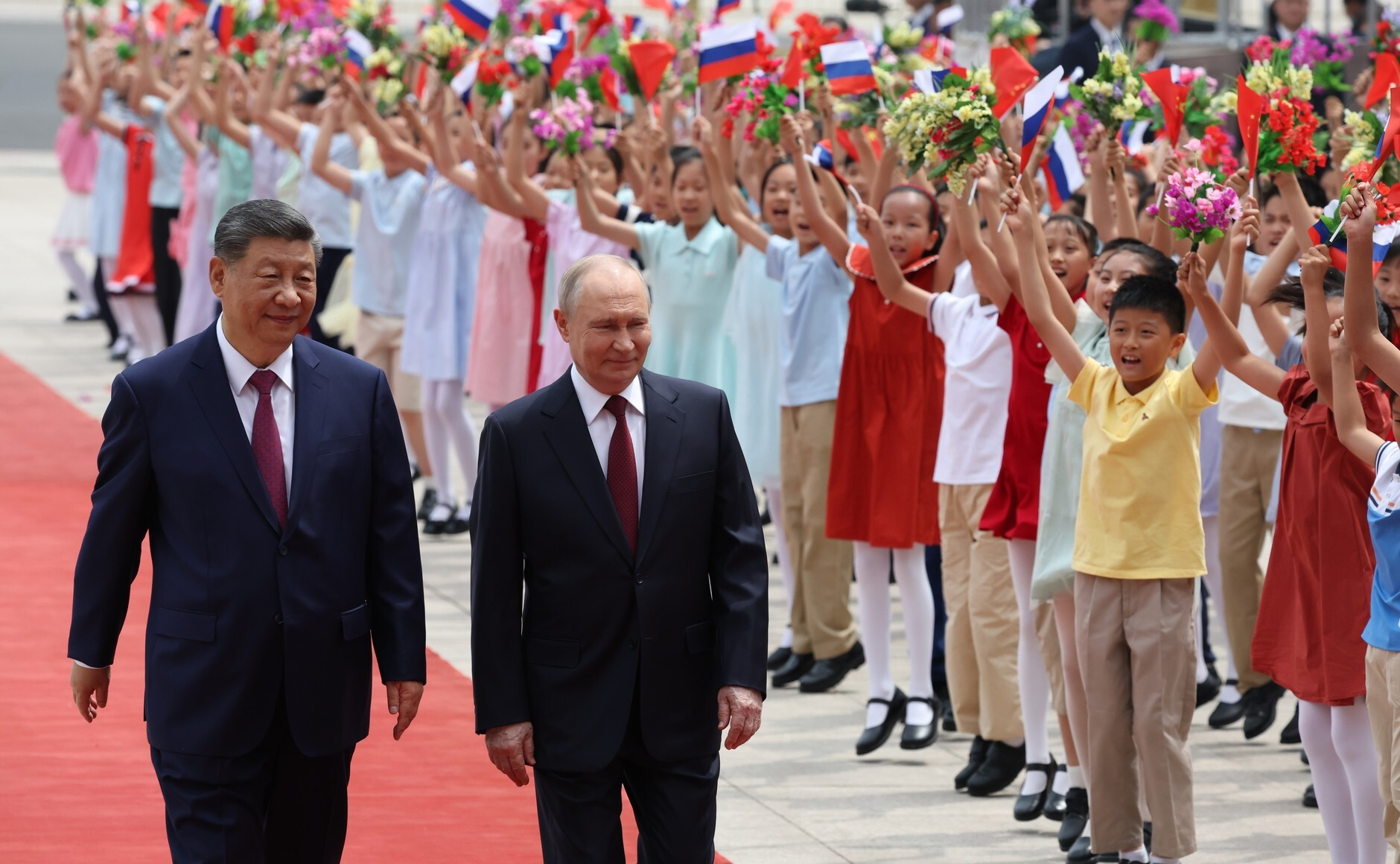
Xi and Putin walking past children holding Chinese and Russian flags

Analysts and media outlets noted that the visit underscored Russia's growing dependence on China following Western sanctions imposed after the Russian invasion of Ukraine. Reuters wrote that the two countries' "no limits" partnership had strengthened since the start of the war, while several commentators described Moscow as increasingly reliant on Beijing economically and diplomatically.

Some analysts also linked the summit to the ongoing Russo-Ukrainian war, noting that China continued to maintain close strategic ties with Russia despite presenting itself as neutral in the conflict. Reuters reported that China has maintained close economic and diplomatic ties with Russia despite the war. Analyst Ian Storey of the ISEAS – Yusof Ishak Institute argued that it was unrealistic to expect Xi Jinping to pressure Putin to end the war in Ukraine, stating that a Russian defeat would weaken Putin politically. Storey added that China would likely continue providing Russia with diplomatic support at the United Nations, as well as economic assistance and dual-use technologies.

The visit also drew renewed attention to reports of Chinese assistance to Russia's military sector. During the summit, several media outlets referred to a Reuters investigation alleging that Chinese military facilities had trained Russian personnel later deployed in Ukraine, despite Beijing publicly presenting itself as neutral in the war.

Commentators highlighted the lack of a final agreement on the proposed Power of Siberia 2 gas pipeline as a sign of China's stronger negotiating position. Reuters reported that the project had become increasingly important for Russia after the loss of much of the European gas market following the invasion of Ukraine, while analysts cited by several media outlets described the absence of a deal as a setback for Moscow.

Some observers viewed the visit in the context of China's broader diplomatic balancing between Russia and the United States, noting that Putin arrived in Beijing less than a week after talks between Xi Jinping and U.S. president Donald Trump. Reuters wrote that Beijing sought to portray itself as a "stable and predictable power" amid global tensions.

Some analysts linked the summit to broader geopolitical tensions in the Middle East, noting that both Xi and Putin criticised U.S. foreign policy during the visit and called for greater international stability amid the ongoing Iran conflict.

== Results ==
On 20 May, Chinese foreign ministry announced that China has decided to extend the visa-free policy for Russian citizens to 31 December 2027. On 20 July, Putin signed an executive order to extend the visa-free policy for Chinese citizens to 31 December 2027.

== See also ==
- 2026 state visit by Donald Trump to China
- 2025 state visit by Xi Jinping to Russia
- 2024 visit by Vladimir Putin to China
- List of international trips made by Vladimir Putin
