= Monument to the fighters against the Comintern =

Anti-Communist monument in Harbin, Manchukuo

Coordinates: 45°45′18″N 126°38′09″E

- Памятник героям, павшим в борьбе с Коминтерном
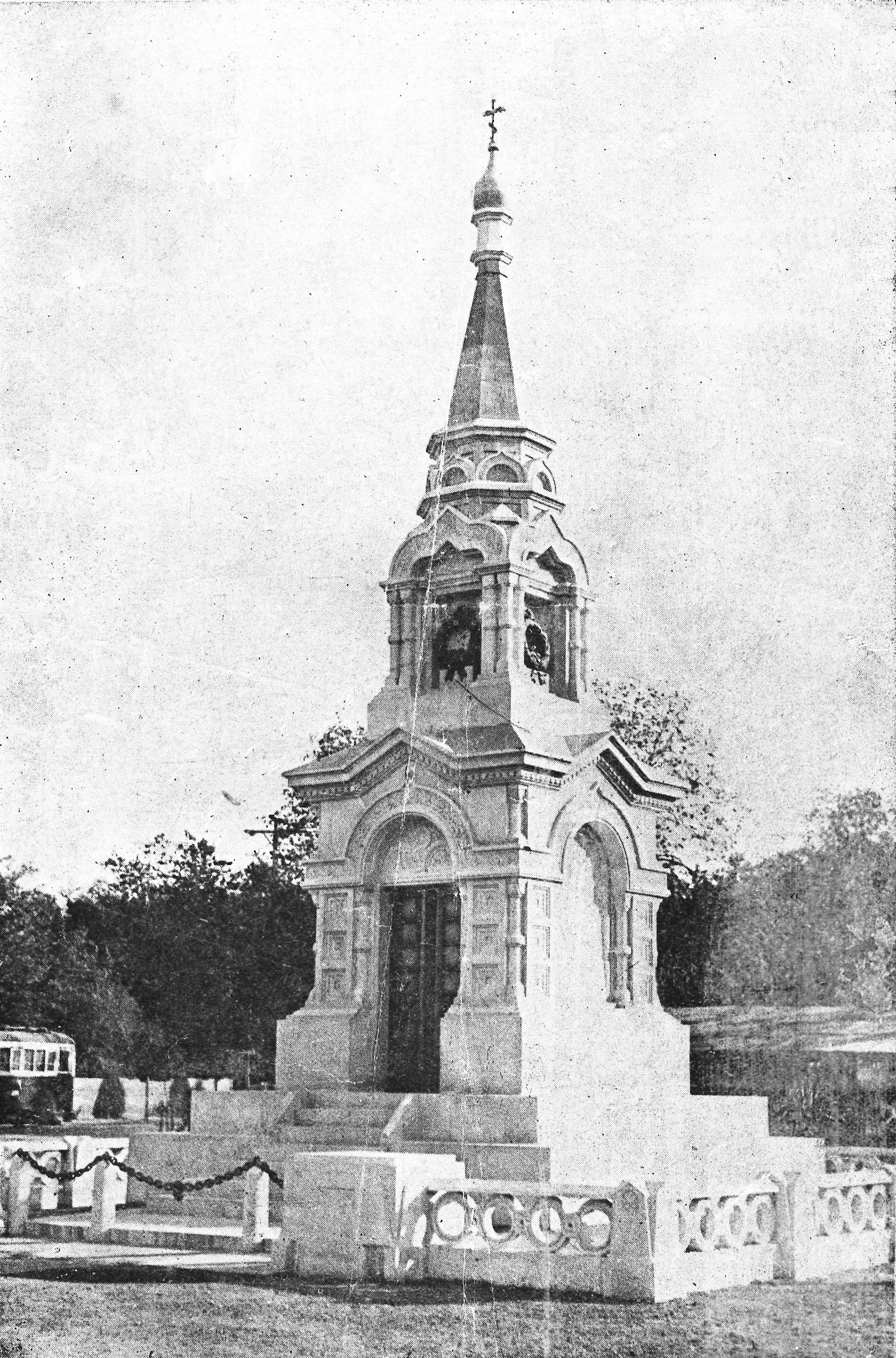
- Location: Harbin, Manchukuo
- Designer: N. Zakharov; N. Sviridov
- Builder: N. Kalugin
- Height: 12 metres
- Beginning date: 1940
- Completion date: 1941
- Inauguration date: June 8, 1941
- Dismantled date: August 1945

The Monument to the fighters against the Comintern (Russian: Памятник борцам с Коминтерном; full name: Monument to Heroes Fallen in the Fight against the Comintern, Russian: Памятник героям, павшим в борьбе с Коминтерном) was a monument that stood on Cathedral Square in Harbin opposite to St. Nicholas Cathedral and the New Harbin Hotel (now Harbin International) in 1941–1945. It was dedicated to the White émigrés who died in the fight against the Comintern. It was the only monument of its kind in the world. The grand opening of the monument took place on June 8, 1941. The monument was demolished four years later and replaced with a monument to Soviet soldiers.

== History ==
The idea to build the monument belongs to Vladimir Kislitsin, head of the Bureau for Russian Emigrants in the Manchurian Empire, who was designed after the death of Mikhail Natarov. Natarov was a communicator of the Asano detachment, who died in the Soviet bombardment during the battles of Khalkhin Gol. His death was used by political circles of emigration with the active support of the Japanese authorities to form a cult of heroes who fell in the fight against the Comintern, designed to unite the Russian emigration on an anti-Soviet basis. Kislitsin's idea to build the monument was supported by the head of the Japanese military mission in Harbin, General Hikosaburo Hata, as well as his successor in this position, General Genzo Yanagita. The Bureau then appealed to the people of Manchukuo to donate money for the monument. Funds were raised in a short period of time, after which a competition of projects for the monument was announced, the condition of which was "that the project should be in the Orthodox spirit, harmonize with the Cathedral and be a work of art". Three projects were submitted for consideration by Zakharov, Pyanyshev and Myzgin. After the competition, Zakharov's design was chosen, but with an increase in height and some changes, which were carried out by Russian architects under the supervision of Sviridov. The laying of the stone took place on November 7, 1940. The next day the "Committee for the construction of the monument" was established. The development of the project and technical supervision were entrusted to the architect Sviridov, Kalugin was appointed as the manufacturer of works, sculptural works were handed over to Zverev and metal works to Doctrin.

The monument was opened on June 8, 1941 on Cathedral Square, opposite to St. Nicholas Cathedral and the New Harbin Hotel (now Harbin International) by Kislitsin and the General. In his speech, Kislitsin said, among other things, that "on the day of the opening and consecration of the monument to the anti-Comintern fighters, unique in its idea and its significance in the world, it is necessary to remember those who died from the forces of evil", after which he listed a long list. It included and was listed by name: Emperor Nicholas II and members of his family, shot in Yekaterinburg, Grand Duke Michael Alexandrovich, shot in Perm, other shot members of the imperial family, the leaders of the White movement Kolchak, Kornilov, Wrangel, Kappel, Annenkov and others. A procession led by Metropolitan Meletius, Archbishop Nestor, Bishops Demetrius and Juvenal, who performed a prayer service and the rite of consecration of the monument, came up from St. Nicholas Cathedral. Afterward speeches were made by Kislitsin, Yanagita, and others on the occasion of the grand opening of the monument. In the evening, a banquet was organized by Kislitsin on behalf of the Bureau at the Harbin Modern Hotel.

After the Soviet troops entered Harbin in the second half of August 1945, the monument was demolished and in its place was erected a monument to fallen Soviet soldiers, which stands to this day. At the same time, the street running from Harbin Railway Station to Cathedral Square was renamed Krasnoarmeyskaya (in honor of the Red Army). The street was originally named Vokzalny Prospekt, and from the 1920s it was named Horvatsky Prospekt (in honor of General Dmitry Horvat).

== Description ==
The monument lasted four years. Its construction cost 69,750 gobis and the height of the monument was 12 meters. The monument was made of light gray granite in the Russian style. In the niches of the two side facades are bas-reliefs carved from granite: St. George, striking the serpent with a spear, and Archistratigus Michael, striking with a fiery spear and trampling the devil with his foot. On the south side of the monument was written: "To the Heroes who fell in the fight against the Comintern". Inside the monument was a marble sarcophagus with an inscribed commemorative plaque, the inscription on which read: "With the blessing of His Eminence Metropolitan Meletius, with the permission and assistance of the authorities, headed by the chief of the Imperial Nipponese Military Mission, General Hata, and his successor as chief of the mission, General Yanagita, on the initiative of the chief of the Main Bureau for Russian Emigrants, General Kislitsin, the construction of the monument was initiated by the chief of the Russian Emigrants' Affairs Bureau, General Kislitsin, the Construction Committee under the chairmanship of the Imperial Nippon Army, Major Naimura, with secretaries Matsubara and Gordeev, with the engineer-architect Sviridov supervising the erection of the monument. Sviridova, with the manufacturer of works, engineer Kalugin, and his assistant, engineer Feoktistov, sculptor Zverev, at the expense of the population of the Manchurian Empire, erected this monument in Christmas 1941, era Kangde 8th."

== Gallery ==
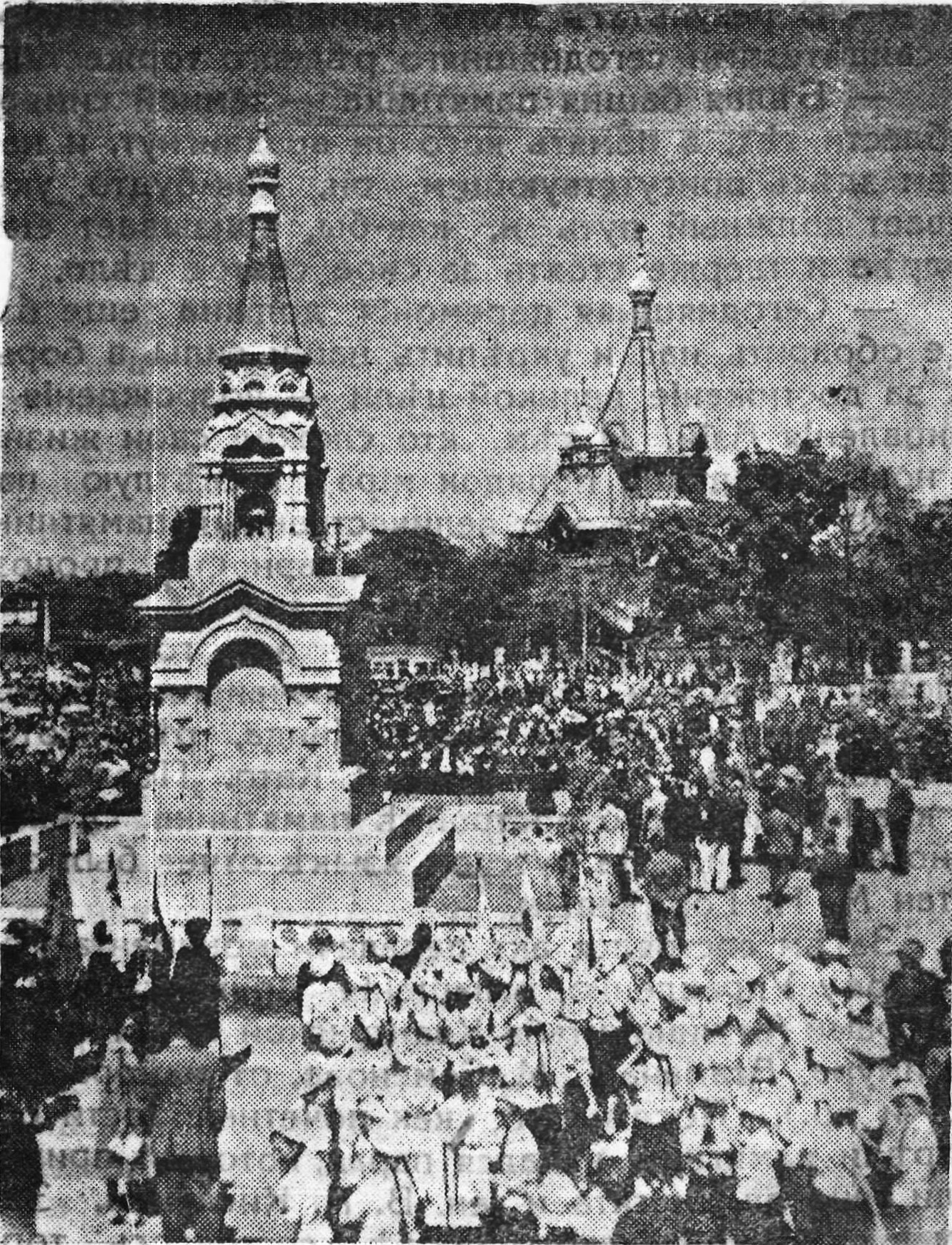
View of the monument at the opening (in the back of St. Nicholas cathedral)

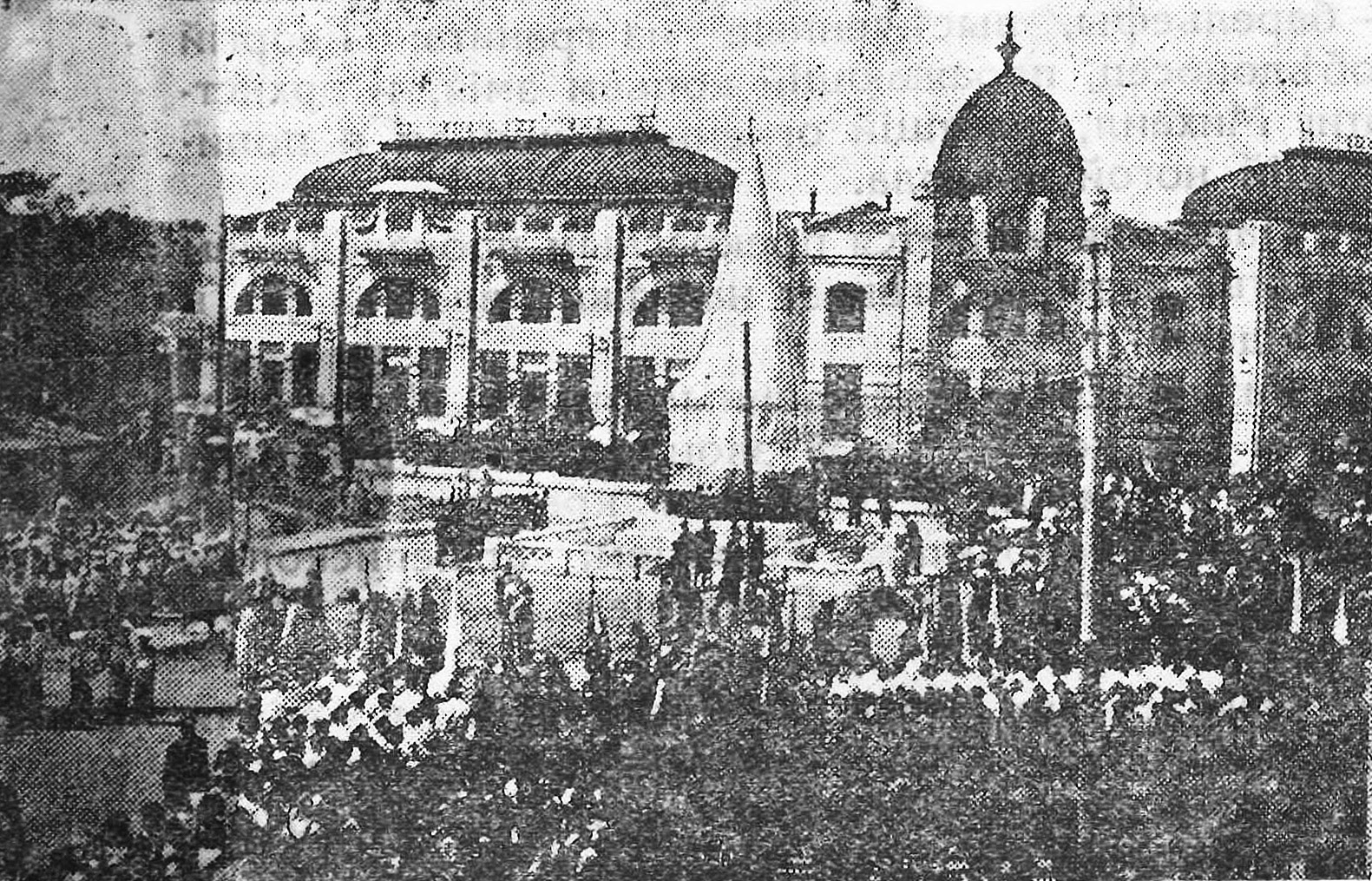
Grand opening of the monument

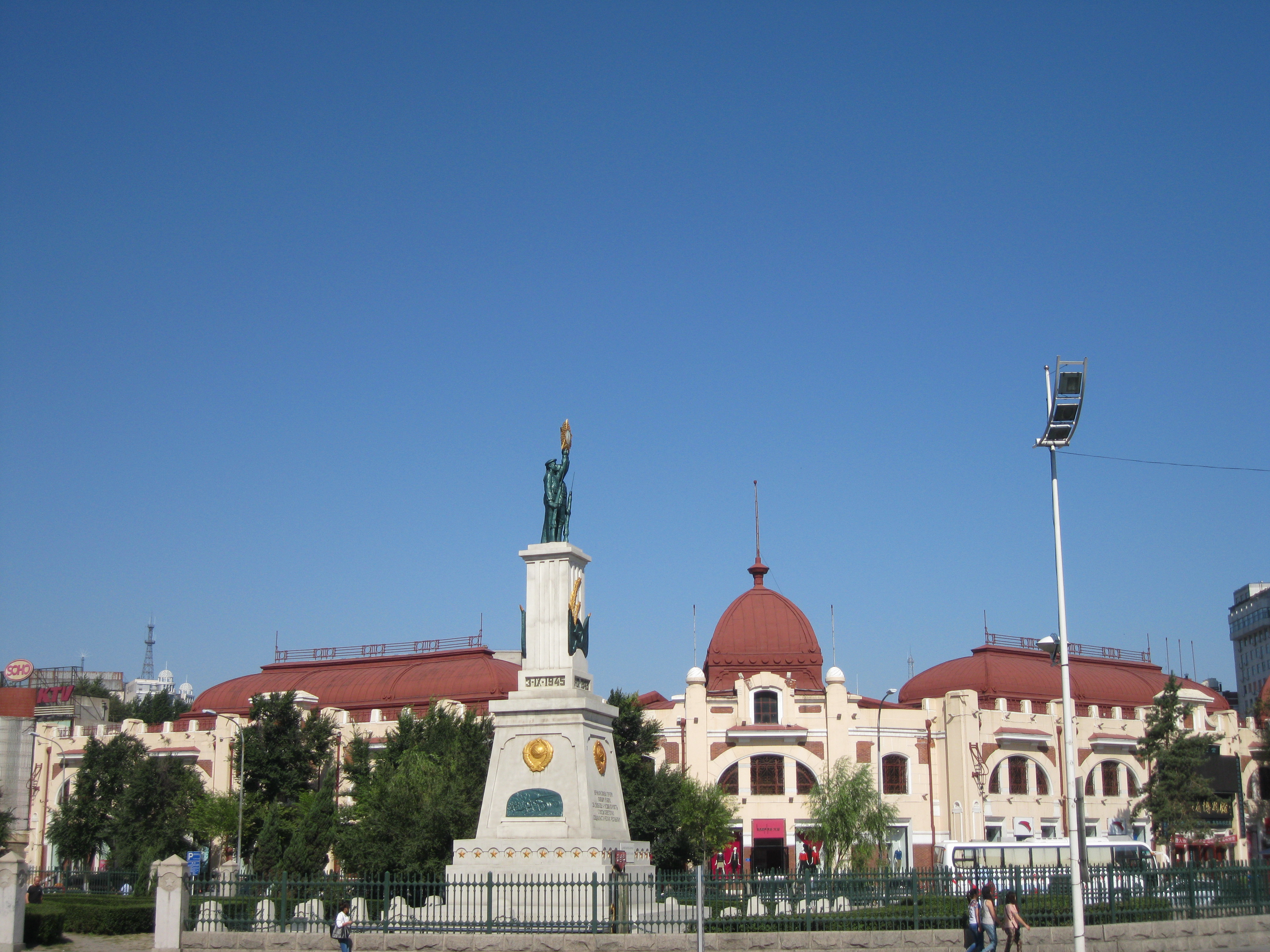
Monument in honor of the Soviet soldiers in place of the monument to the fighters against the Comintern (2012)

== Bibliography ==
- Aurilene, E. E. (2008). Rossiyskaya diaspora v Kitaye. 1920-150-e gg.: Monografiya Российская диаспора в Китае. 1920-1950-е гг.: Монография. [Russian diaspora in China. 1920-1950. Monography] (in Russian). ISBN 978-5-7875-0056-1.
- Balakshin, P. (2013). Final v Kitaye: vozniknoveniye, razvitiye i izcheznoveniye beloy emigratsii na Dalnem Vostoke Финал в Китае: возникновение, развитие и исчезновение белой эмиграции на Дальнем Востоке [Finale in China: the emergence, development and disappearance of white emigration in the Far East] (in Russian). Vol. 1. Moscow: Гос. публ. ист. б-ка России. ISBN 978-5-85209-297-7.
- Bondarenko, I. A. (2004). Khristianskoye zodchestvo. Novye materialy i issledovaniya Христианское зодчество. Новые материалы и исследования [Christian architecture. New materials and research] (in Russian). Moscow: Editorial URSS. ISBN 5354008336.
- Buyakov, A. M. (2005). Znaki i nagrady rossiyskikh emigrantskikh organizatsiy v Kitaye: (Dayren, Tyanzin, Kharbin, Khunchun, Tsinanfu, Shankhay) 1921-1949 gg.: materialy k spravochniku Знаки и награды российских эмигрантских организаций в Китае: (Дайрен, Тяньцзинь, Харбин, Хуньчунь, Цинаньфу, Шанхай) 1921—1949 гг.: материалы к справочнику [Badges and awards of Russian emigrant organizations in China: (Dairen, Tianjin, Harbin, Hongchun, Qinanfu, Shanghai) 1921-1949: materials for the reference book.] (in Russian). Vladivostok: Русский остров. ISBN 5-93577-030-X.
- Fyodorova, Yu. S. (2004). "Russkaya pravoslavnaya tserkov v severo-vostochnom Kitaye v 20-30 gody XX v." Русская православная церковь в северо-восточном Китае в 20—30 годы XX в. [Russian Orthodox Church in Northeast China in the 20's and 30's of the 20th century.]. Россия и АТР (in Russian) (3).
- Karaulov, A. K.; Korostelev, V. V. (2001). "Pobornik tserkovnogo yedineniya (k 40-letiyu so dnya blazhennoy konchiny mitropolita Nestora)" Поборник церковного единения (к 40-летию со дня блаженной кончины митрополита Нестора) [Champion of church unity (on the 40th anniversary of the blessed death of Metropolitan Nestor)]. Русская Атлантида (in Russian) (8). Chelyabinsk.
- Kozlov, Yu. G. (2005). Tsena vauchera ili «Mersedes»: chyorny rab nash Цена ваучера или «Мерседес»: чёрный раб наш [The price of a voucher or a Mercedes: the black slave is ours] (in Russian). Moscow: Изд. содружество А. Богатых и Э. Ракитской. ISBN 5-98575-089-2.
- Litvintsev, G. (2004). "Manchzhurskaya Atlantida" Маньчжурская Атлантида [Manchurian Atlantis]. Российская газета — Дальний Восток (in Russian) (3537).
- Solovyova, N. A. (2003). Pechatnye izdaniya kharbinskoy rossiki: annotirovanny bibliografichesky ukazatel pechatnykh izdaniy, vyvezennikh khabarovskimi arkhivistami iz Kharbina v 1945 godu Печатные издания харбинской россики: аннотированный библиографический указатель печатных изданий, вывезенных хабаровскими архивистами из Харбина в 1945 году [Printed editions of Harbin Rossika: annotated bibliographic index of printed editions taken by Khabarovsk archivists from Harbin in 1945] (in Russian). Khavarovsk: Частная коллекция. ISBN 5-7875-0043-1.
- Yakovkin, E. V. (2016). "Rol yaponskoy voyennoy missii v Kharbine v postanovke ideologicheskikh zadach dlya russkoy emigratsii v Manchzhurii v 1932-1945 gg" Роль японской военной миссии в Харбине в постановке идеологических задач для русской эмиграции в Маньчжурии в 1932-1945 гг. [The role of the Japanese military mission in Harbin in setting ideological tasks for the Russian emigration in Manchuria in 1932-1945.]. Ежегодник «Япония» (in Russian) (45). Moscow: 173–180.
