= Saint Nicholas Cathedral, Harbin =

Orthodox church in Harbin, China

- Свято-Николаевский собор
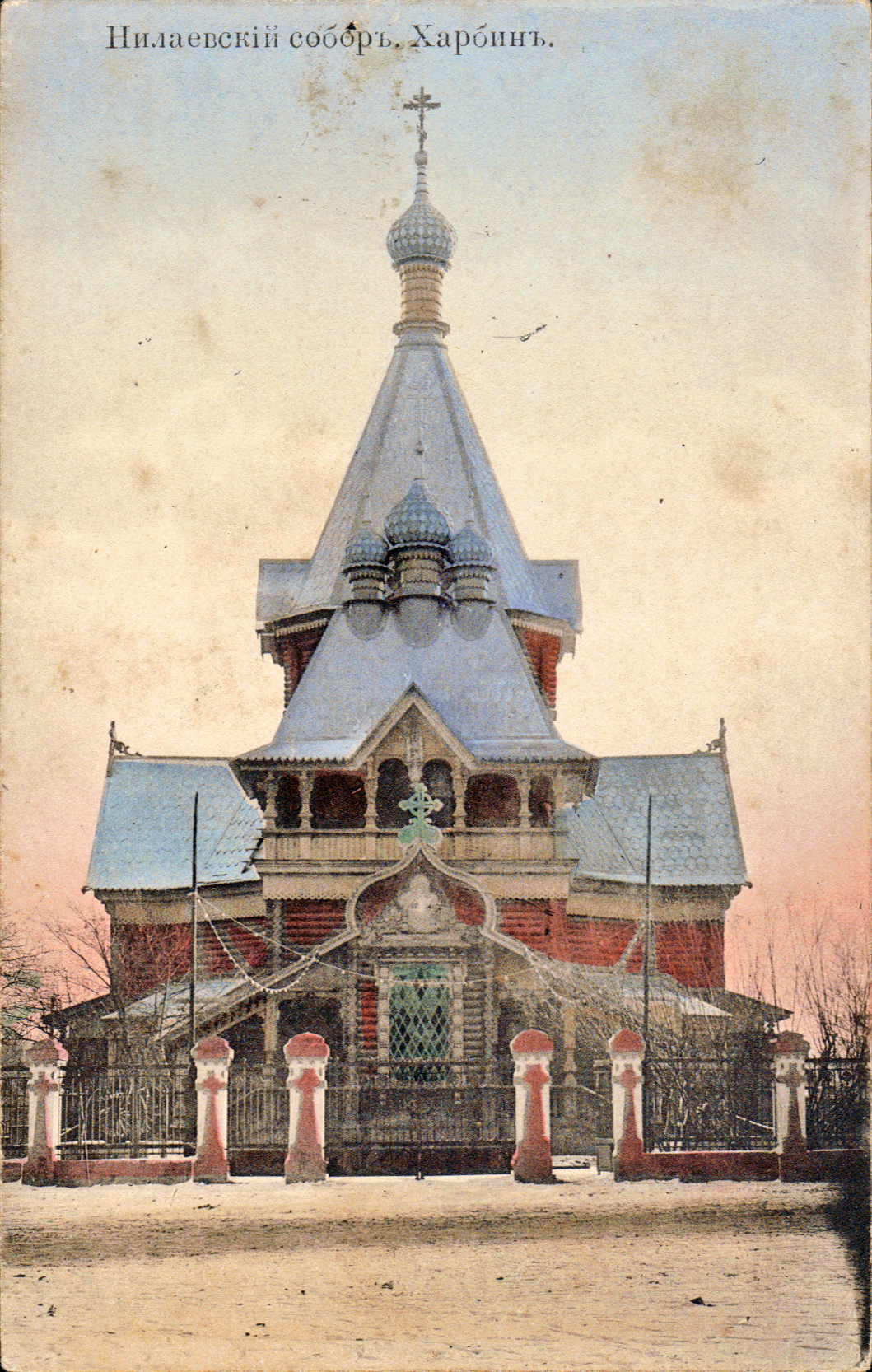

Religion
- Affiliation: Orthodox

Location
- Municipality: Harbin
- Country: China
- Interactive map of Saint Nicholas Cathedral, Harbin

Architecture
- Style: Russian Revival architecture
- Completed: 1900
- Destroyed: August 23–24, 1966

Saint Nicholas Cathedral (Russian: Свято-Николаевский собор) was a wooden Orthodox church in Harbin, China. It was located in the center of Cathedral Square, in the upper part of the Nangan district (at the highest point of the city). The cathedral was one of the main symbols of Harbin Russians.

Since 1922 it was the cathedral of the Orthodox Diocese of Harbin and Manchuria, which until 1945 was part of the Russian Orthodox Church Outside of Russia, then the East Asian Exarchate of the Moscow Patriarchate, and from 1957 to 1966, it was part of the Chinese Orthodox Church. On August 23–24, 1966, the cathedral was destroyed by the Red Guards.

== History ==
=== Prelude ===
Priest Alexander Zhuravsky founded the first Orthodox church when he arrived at the site of construction in February 1898, which was located first in an abandoned fanza, and with the onset of cold weather in a specially built barracks. However, the small homemade church in the barrack house could not meet the needs of the city under construction.

On June 11, 1899, Harbin received the following dispatch from the Board of the China Eastern Railway Society: "To Chief Engineer Yugovich. The Board joins your proposal to lay a temple in the name of St. Nicholas, regarding the blessing today made communication with Archpriest". The next day Archpriest Alexander Zhelobovsky authorized the laying of a wooden St. Nicholas Church in the village of Sungari (so far still called the future Harbin) on the project approved by the Highest. The project was developed in St. Petersburg by the architect of the CER Society Joseph Padlevsky.

They chose a place for the temple on a square in the center of the New Town, at the intersection of two highways: Bolshoi Avenue and Horvatovsky Avenue, leading from the station to Old Harbin. This location made the temple an architectural dominant of the city, and later, thanks to its outlines, it became the main symbol of Harbin. Bishop Eusebius sent from Vladivostok the archpastoral blessing for the construction of the temple, as well as the antimins for it.

=== Construction ===
The laying of the church took place on October 1, 1899 on the feast of the Protection of the Blessed Virgin Mary. Selected wood was used for the quality of construction work. According to some data, the wood was delivered from Canada by special order, about what allegedly in the following years was evidenced by markings on the cuts of timbers. The project in the style of Russian tent temples was made by architect Joseph Podlevsky. Harbin engineer Alexei Levteev observed the exact observance of the project on the site.

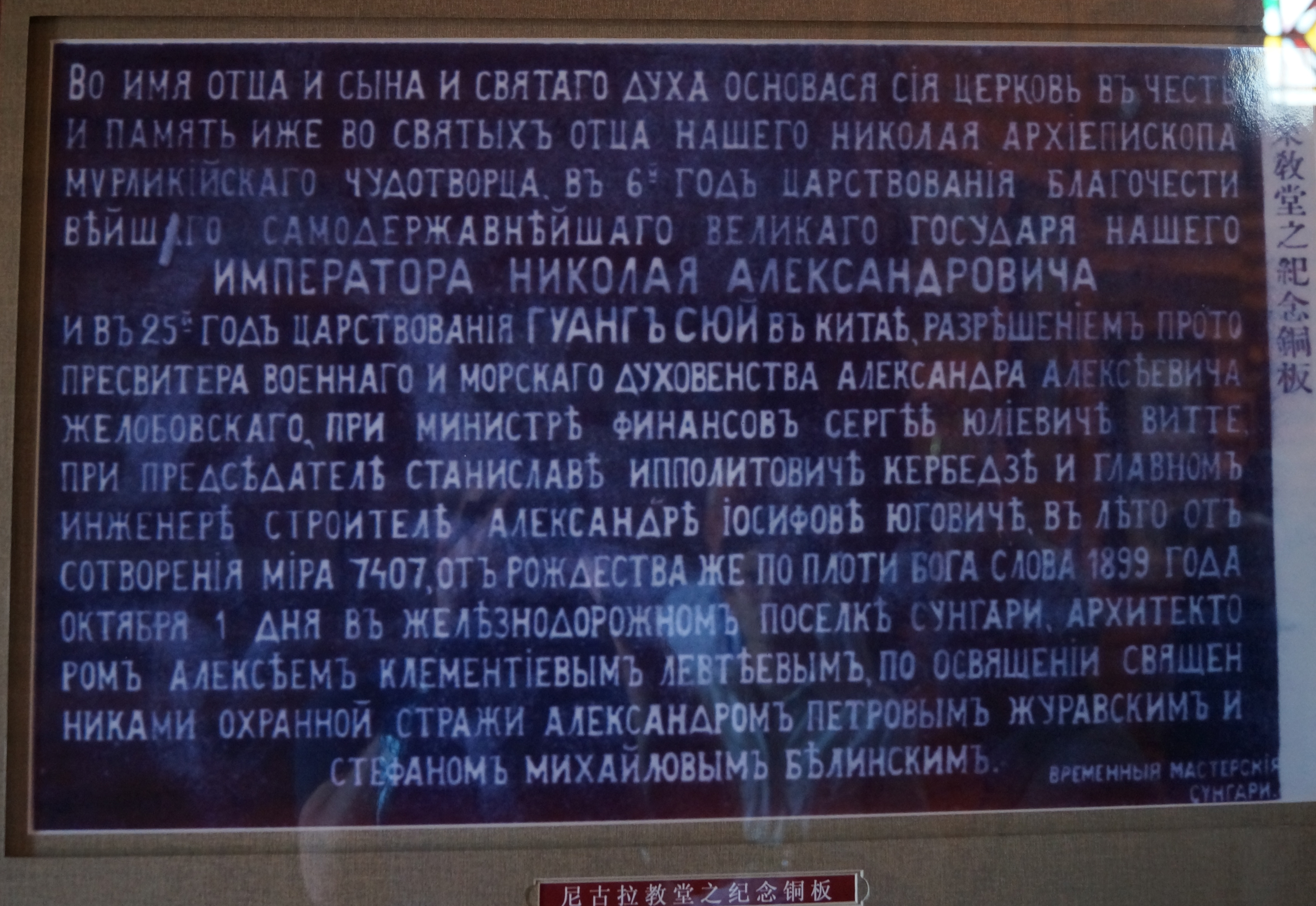
Commemorative plaque from the first St. Nicholas Cathedral.

By the end of the spring of 1900 the construction of the temple was considerably advanced, but the construction had to be stopped because of the outbreak of the Yihetuan rebellion. In Manchuria they began to destroy ready and under construction sections of the CER, to set fire and to plunder station settlements. In July they approached Harbin, so urgent evacuation was prepared and measures for armed self-defense were taken. Staff formations of the Security Guard, with the participation of numerous volunteers, were involved in the defense of the city. The Russian government refrained from active action until a certain point. When the Yihetuan approached the Amur River and began shelling the Russian city of Blagoveshchensk from the Chinese side of the river, troops were sent to Manchuria. In coalition with several Western powers, the Yihetuan rebellion was suppressed in a relatively short period of time.

With the lifting of the siege, the construction of the Novogorodnoye temple was resumed, for which utensils, iconostasis and iconostasis icons were sent from Russia. The solemn consecration of St. Nicholas Church took place on December 18, 1900. It was attended by all the priests of Manchuria: Alexander Zhuravsky, Stefan Belinsky and Jacob Matkovsky.

Initially the church was listed as a "frontier church". Since 1903, it was changed to "railway church" (CER), and by the decree of the Holy Synod of February 29, 1908 was transformed into a cathedral. In 1922, with the establishment of the independent Harbin-Manchurian Diocese in Harbin, the church received the status of a cathedral, and the post of rector was transformed into the post of clergyman. In 1923, a side chapel in the cathedral was consecrated in honor of the icon of the Mother of God "Joy of the Unwanted".

According to the memories of Harbin priest Nikolai Paderin, it was "a wooden, small, but stylish and splendid" cathedral. Also, Paderin states that "it was the father of all the churches of the diocese" and remarks that "the cathedral and the image of St. Nicholas were inseparable in the minds of the faithful."

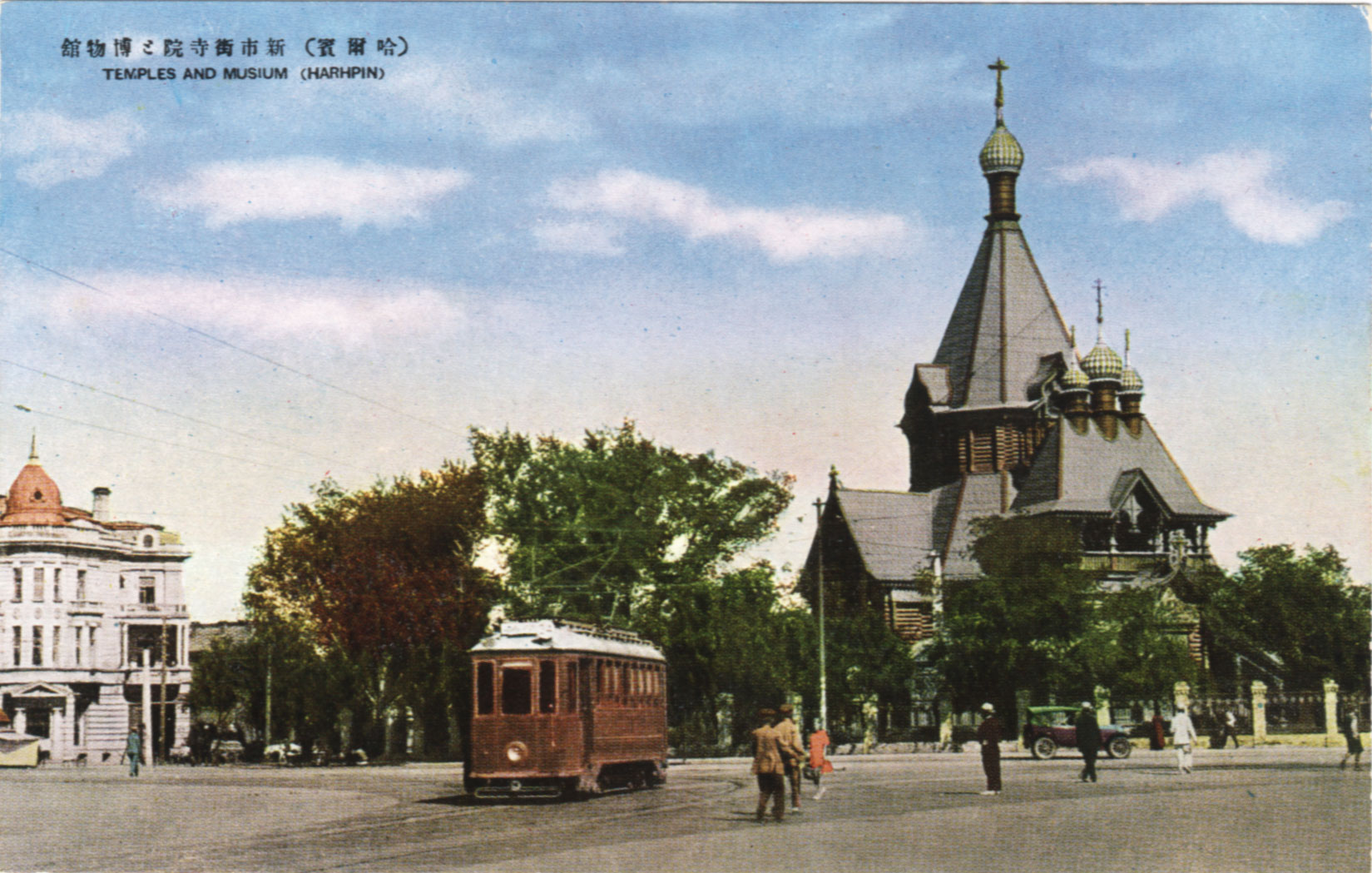
Saint Nicholas Cathedral, 1940

In 1941, the Monument to the fighters against the Comintern was erected on Cathedral Square, in the immediate vicinity of the cathedral.

=== Demolition and rebuilding ===
The destruction of the temple during the Cultural Revolution was described by Vladimir Levitsky in his book Wharf on the Sungari:

18-го августа 1966 года в Св. Николаевском соборе совершалось торжественное всенощное бдение. В то же время на площади между отелем «Нью Харбин» и Московскими рядами хунвейбины собрали многолюдный митинг, на котором, как потом стало известно, решалась судьба Собора и всех харбинских церквей. Казалось, ничто не предвещало скорого злодеяния. На другой день, 19-го августа, был праздник Преображения Господня и служилась литургия. Никто не думал, что это будет последней литургией в Соборе.
Служил её о. Стефан У, последний настоятель Собора. Во время службы в Собор вошло несколько молодых китайцев, говорящих по-русски. Отрекомендовавшись студентами Пекинского политехнического института, молодые люди попросили разрешения подняться на хоры, где они простояли всю литургию, с интересом следя за ходом богослужения. Прощаясь, они сказали, что им здесь понравилось и они придут ещё. <…> Утром 23-го августа 1966 года, в разгар «культурной революции», хунвейбины, возглавляемые студентами Пекинского политехнического института, с барабанным боем, с плясками и криками победы ворвались в Св. Николаевский кафедральный собор с явным намерением учинить разгром и не оставить «камня на камне».
Весть о действиях хунвейбинов быстро разнеслась по городу, и кто мог поспешили к Собору с надеждой уладить дело и предотвратить то, что казалось ещё простым недоразумением. <…> Чем ближе мы, однако, подходили, тем более явно убеждались, что тревога была не напрасной. То, что пришлось видеть, вселило в душу ужас: гремели барабаны, слышались крики и завывания толпы, шёл дым… Ограда Собора была заполнена хунвейбинами. Одни из них карабкались на крышу Собора, чтобы поставить там красные знамёна, другие выносили изнутри наши святыни и швыряли их в разожжённые костры, где все сгорало, сверкая на солнце. Горело два больших костра — один в ограде Собора, другой у входа в Иверскую часовню. На этих кострах были сожжены все иконы Собора и часовни, в том числе образ Святого Николая-Чудотворца, стоявший многие годы на харбинском вокзале, затем в Иверской часовне и, незадолго до злодеяния, перенесённый в Собор. В тот же день были сожжены все снятые иконы, находившиеся в закрытом в то время Св. Алексеевском храме в Модягоу и в Свято-Иверском храме на Офицерской улице. Во время сожжения колокола всех трёх храмов не переставали звонить и звонили все последующие дни, терзая душу верующих — это китайские хулиганы дорвались до недосягаемого им прежде и упивались теперь торжеством.
На другой день, 24-го августа, началась разборка крыши и стен Собора. Сначала, с помощью пожарных лестниц, разобрали главный шатёр и окружающие его кровли и купола. Затем приступили к бревенчатым стенам, с которыми покончили молниеносно. 27-го августа, в канун Успения, от Собора уже не осталось ничего, кроме фундамента. На его месте был выстроен очень высокий памятник, посвященный «борцам культурной революции». Через несколько лет, когда «культурная революция» уже потеряла свою популярность, он был разрушен. Теперь на этом месте устроен сквер: разбиты клумбы с цветами, проведены посыпанные песком дорожки, устроен фонтан. Этот сквер, утопающий летом в цветах, напоминает большую могилу в память Собора, могилу без креста.

On August 18, 1966, a solemn all-night vigil was celebrated in St. Nicholas Cathedral. At the same time on the square between the New Harbin hotel and Moscow rows, the Red Guards gathered a crowded meeting, which, as it later became known, decided the fate of the Cathedral and all the churches of Harbin. It seemed that nothing foreshadowed the imminent atrocity. The next day, August 19, was the Feast of the Transfiguration of the Lord and the liturgy was served. No one thought that this would be the last liturgy in the Cathedral.
It was served by Fr. Stephen Woo, the last rector of the Cathedral. During the service, several young Chinese men who spoke Russian entered the Cathedral. Having been introduced as students of the Beijing Polytechnic Institute, the young men asked permission to go up to the choir, where they stood for the entire liturgy, watching the service with interest. When they said goodbye, they said that they enjoyed it and would come again. <...> On the morning of August 23, 1966, at the height of the Cultural Revolution, the Red Guards, led by students of the Beijing Polytechnic Institute, burst into St. Nicholas Cathedral with drumming, dancing, and shouts of victory, with the clear intention of committing mayhem and leaving no stone unturned.
The news of the Red Guards' actions quickly spread through the city, and those who could hurried to the Cathedral with the hope of settling the matter and preventing what still seemed to be a simple misunderstanding. <...> The nearer we came, however, the more clearly we became convinced that the alarm had not been in vain. What we saw was horrifying: drums rattled, shouts and howls of the crowd were heard, there was smoke... The fence of the Cathedral was filled with Red Guards. Some of them climbed to the roof of the Cathedral to put there red banners, others took out from inside our sacred things and threw them into the bonfires, where everything burned, glistening in the sun. Two large bonfires were burning - one in the fence of the Cathedral, the other at the entrance to the Iver Chapel. On these fires were burned all the icons of the Cathedral and the chapel, including the image of St. Nicholas the Wonderworker, which stood for many years at the Harbin railway station, then in the Iver Chapel and, shortly before the atrocity, transferred to the Cathedral. On the same day, all the icons that had been removed from the then-closed St. Alexeyevsky Church in Modyagou and the Holy Iver Church on Officers' Street were burned. During the burning, the bells of all three churches did not stop ringing and rang all the following days, tormenting the soul of the faithful - it was the Chinese hooligans who got hold of what they could not reach before and were now reveling in the triumph.
On the next day, August 24, the dismantling of the roof and walls of the Cathedral began. First, with the help of fire ladders, they dismantled the main tent and the surrounding roofs and domes. Then began the log walls, which were finished lightning fast. On August 27th, on the eve of the Dormition, nothing remained of the Cathedral except the foundation. In its place was built a very tall monument dedicated to the "fighters of the Cultural Revolution". A few years later, when the cultural revolution had already lost its popularity, it was destroyed. Now there is a public garden on this place: flowerbeds with flowers, sandy paths, a fountain. This square, drowning in flowers in summer, resembles a large grave in memory of the Cathedral, a grave without a cross.

— Vladimir Levitsky, Wharf on the Sungari

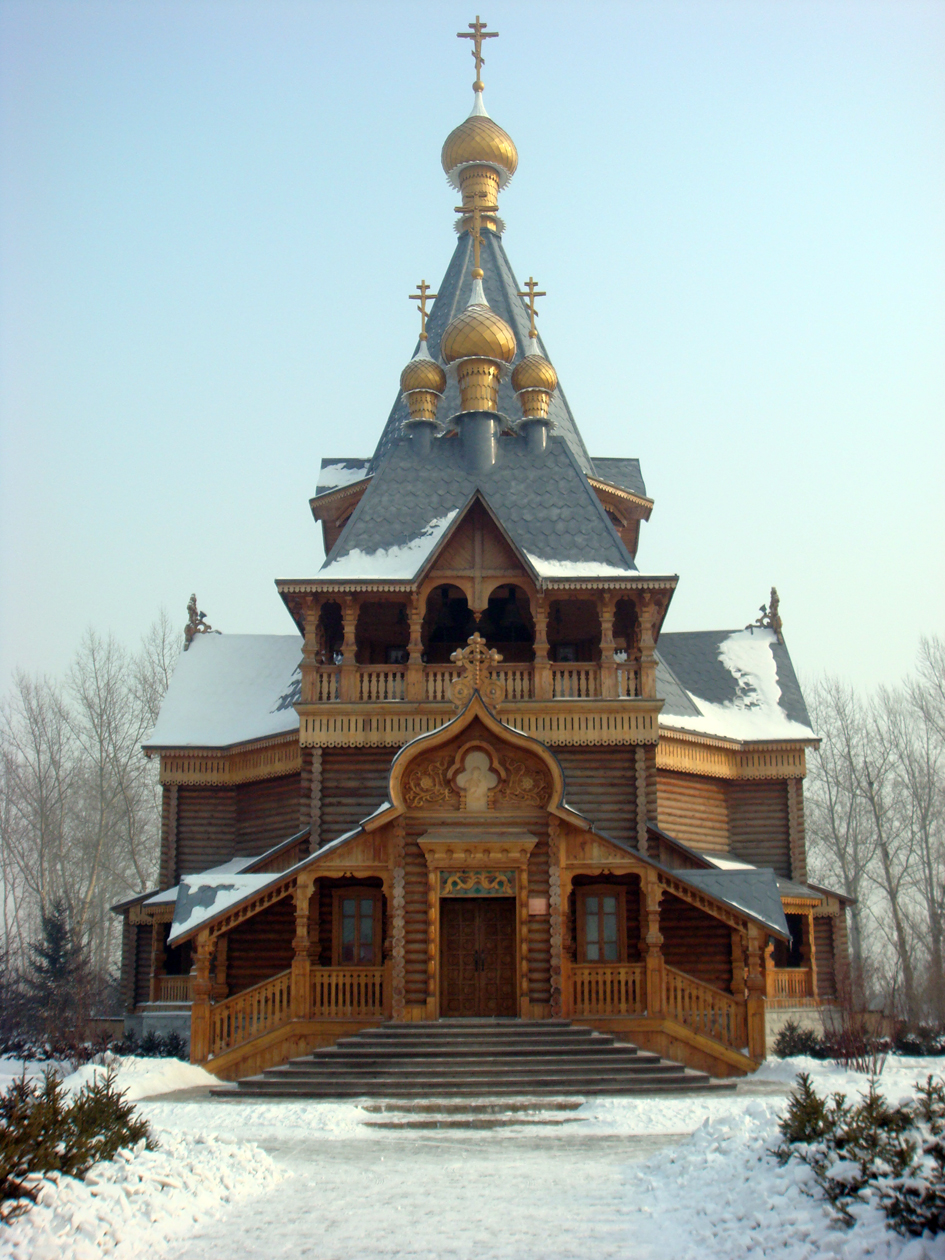
Reconstruction of the cathedral. Tourist resort Volga Manor, located in the suburbs of Harbin, 2009.

The church was rebuilt in late 2009 in the suburbs of Harbin on the private property of Chinese entrepreneur Huang Tzu Xiang, based on the project of Russian architect Nikolai Kradin. Due to the lack of a congregation, it is used as a tourist attraction. As Yulia Dudkina noted, "The new church is not consecrated, there is no one to pray in it - tourists from China, Malaysia and the Philippines come to the Volga. For them, the church is an attraction."

== Clergy ==
Rectors:

- Aleksandr Zhuravsky (1900—1903)
- Piotr Bogdanov (1903—1906)
- Leonty Pekarsky (1906—1937)
- Nicander (Viktorov) (1937—1956)
- Valentin Baryshnikov (1956—1957)
- Anikita Van (1958—1966)

key keepers:

- Pyotr Rozhdestvensky (1922—1924)
- Aristarkh Ponomarev (1924—1931)
- Leonid Viktorov (1931—1937)
- Viktor Guryev (1937—1948)
- Symeon Korostelyov (1948—1956, acting)

Staff priests:

- Ioann Volodkovich (1905—1911)
- Konstantin Tsivilyov (1908—1916)
- Mikhail Trigubov (1911—1917)
- Nikolay Pevtsov (1916—1922)
- Aleksandr Onipkin (1917—1927)
- Sergi Lebedev (1922—1940)
- Leonid Viktorov (1923—1925)
- Sergi Braduchan (1925—1928)
- Leonid Viktorov (1923—1925)
- Aristarkh Ponomarev (1931—1937)
- Georgi Chernavin (1937—1940)
- Tikhon Ilyinsky (1940—1947)
- Piotr (Mylnikov) (1940—1953)
- Vladimir Svetlov (1941—1945)
- Vasily Varyshnikov (1946—1956)
- Vasily Chuvashev (1947—1949)
- Ioann Shachnev (1948—1953)
- Nikolay Paderin (1953—1956)
- Ioann Zaerko (1953—1956)

Supernumerary priests:

- Nikolay Voznesensky (1920—1923)
- Marin Korovin (1922—1923)
- Konstantin Lyustritsky (1923—1925)
- Nikolay Mikhailov (1923—1925)
- Sergi Braduchan (1923—1925)
- Ippolit Fofanov (1924—1926)
- Dimitry Strelnikov (1931—1941)

Staff deacons:

- Porfiry Petrov (1906—1922)
- Mikhail Norin (1920—1928)
- Nikola Ovchinkin (1922—1948)
- Symeon Korostelev (1928—1956)
- Igor Markov (1948—1955)
- Gleb Gulyaev (1956—1957)

Supernumerary deacons:

- Arkady Dolgopolov (1920—1927)
- Dimitry Karzanov (1920—1927)
- Piotr Kotlyarov (1920—1925)

== See also ==
- Monument to the fighters against the Comintern

== Bibliography ==
- Korostelev, V. A.; Karaulov, A. K. (2019). О. В. Косик (ed.). Православие в Маньчжурии. 1898—1956. Очерки истории. Православный Свято-Тихоновский гуманитарный университет. ISBN 978-5-7429-1307-8.
- Levoshko, S. S. (2004). "10". Архитектор Иосиф Владимирович Падлевский и кафедральный Свято-Николаевский собор в Харбине (in Russian). Sydney, Australia: Политехник. pp. 140–143.
