= Soviet Red Army Monument, Harbin =

Monument in Harbin, China

- 哈尔滨苏联红军英雄纪念碑
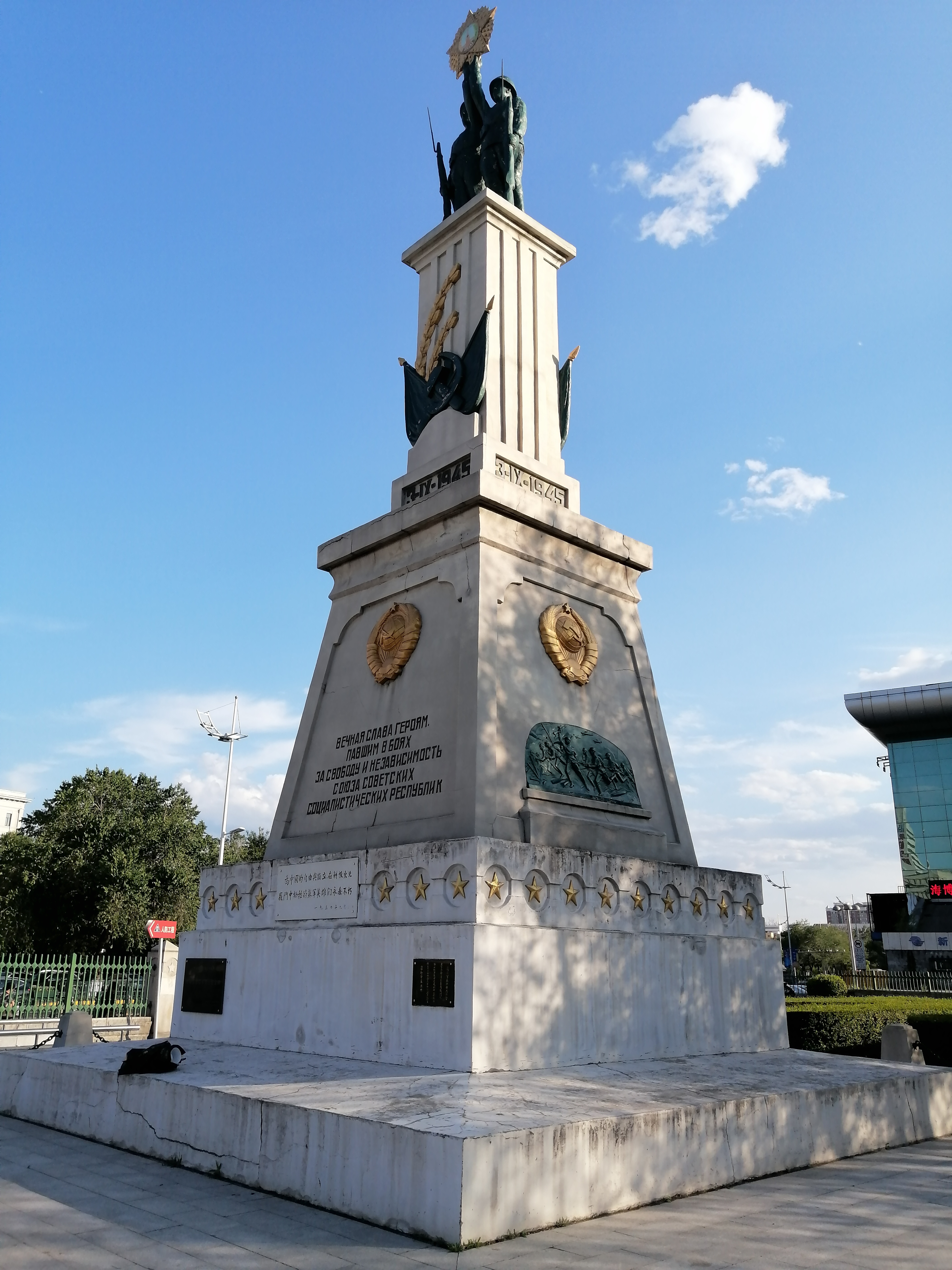
- Interactive map of Soviet Red Army Monument, Harbin
- Location: Nangang District, Harbin, Heilongjiang, China
- Coordinates: 45°45′18″N 126°38′08″E
- Material: Granite
- Height: 18 m (59 ft)
- Beginning date: August 1945
- Completion date: November 7, 1945
- Dedicated to: Fallen Soviet soldiers who took part in the 1945 Soviet invasion of Manchuria during World War II

Soviet Red Army Monument, Harbin
- Simplified Chinese: 哈尔滨苏联红军英雄纪念碑
- Traditional Chinese: 哈爾濱蘇聯紅軍英雄紀念碑
Transcriptions
Standard Mandarin
- Hanyu Pinyin: Hāěrbīn Sūlián Hóngjūn Yīngxióng Jìniàn Bēi
- Wade–Giles: Ha1-erh3-pin1 Su1-lien2 Hung2-chün1 Ying1-hsiung2 Chi4-nien4 Pei1

The Soviet Red Army Monument, Harbin (Chinese: 哈尔滨苏联红军英雄纪念碑; pinyin: Hāěrbīn sūlián hóngjūn yīngxióng jìniàn bēi) is a national monument of China to the fallen Soviet Red Army soldiers who took part in the 1945 Soviet invasion of Manchuria during World War II which liberated Northeast China (Manchuria) from Japanese occupation.

== History ==
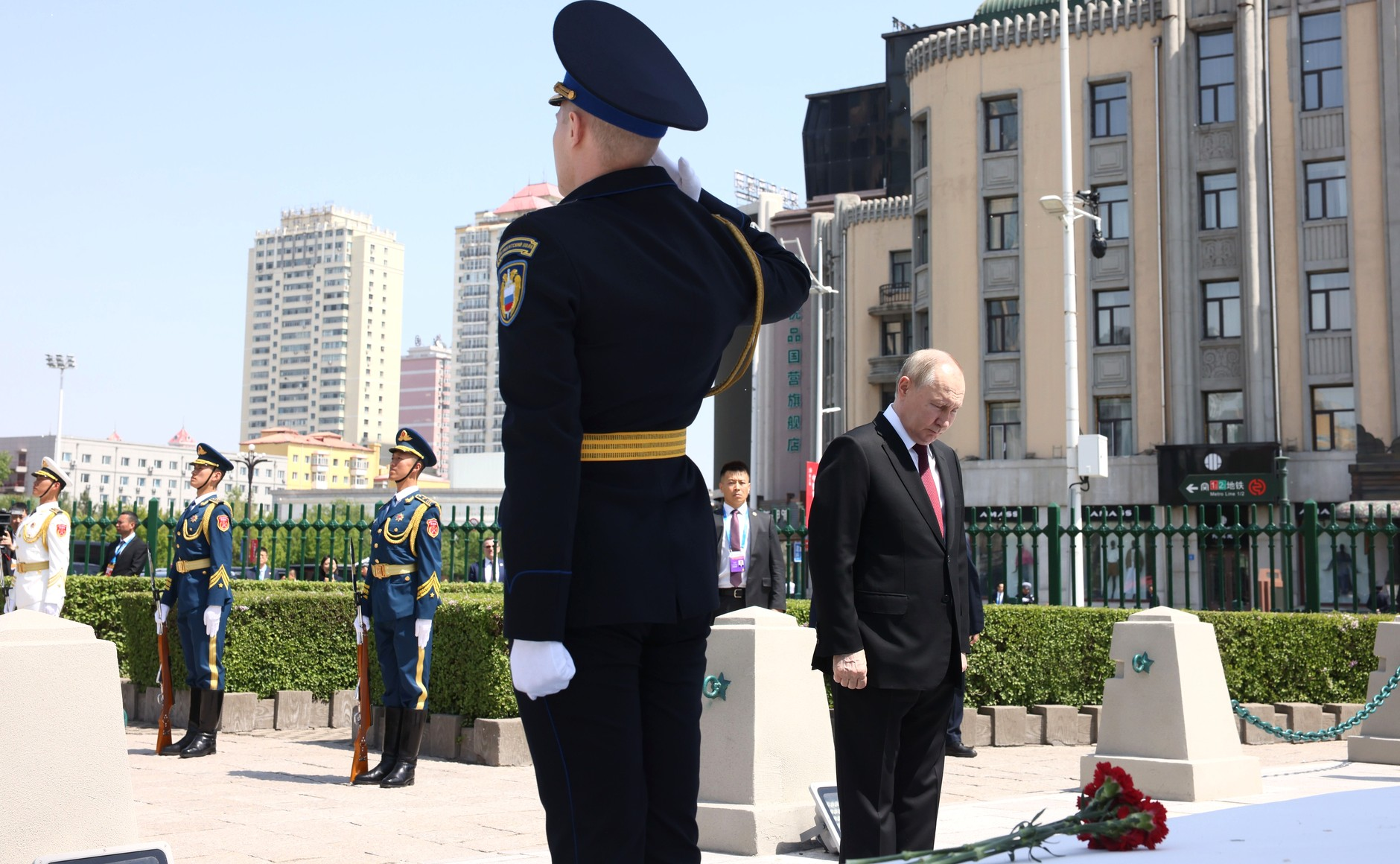
President of Russia Vladimir Putin lays flowers at the monument during his state visit to China (May 17, 2024)

As agreed with the United Kingdom and the United States (Western Allies) at the Tehran Conference in November 1943 and the Yalta Conference in February 1945, the Soviet Union entered World War II's Pacific Theater within three months of the end of the war in Europe. The Soviet invasion of Manchuria began on August 9, 1945, and led to defeat of the Japanese Kwantung Army and toppled the Japanese puppet state of Manchukuo in Manchuria.

After the Soviet troops entered Harbin in the second half of August 1945, the Monument to the fighters against the Comintern, which honored the White Russian émigrés who died in the fight against the Soviet Union, was demolished by Soviet troops. In its place, it was decided by the Soviet Red Army Command to erect a monument to honor fallen Soviet soldiers who died during the liberation of Manchuria from Japanese control. Construction began in August 1945 and was completed on November 7 of the same year, which was the 28th anniversary of the October Revolution. On the same day, the dedication ceremony of the monument was held.

In the 1960s and 1970s, Sino-Soviet relations deteriorated significantly due to the Sino-Soviet split and the 1969 Sino-Soviet border conflict. As a result, many monuments honoring Soviet soldiers were affected including the Red Army Martyrs Monument in Harbin were covered by scaffolding. However, on Qingming Festival and Victory in Europe Day, the Soviet embassy, Soviet consulate, China-Soviet Union Friendship Association and other organizations would lay wreaths in front of the monument. Following the normalization of Sino-Soviet relations in the 1980s, the scaffolding was removed and the monument underwent repairs.

The monument became one of Harbin's cultural relics protection sites in 1995 and on November 11, 1997, then President of Russia Boris Yeltsin, during his state visit to China, visited Harbin and laid a wreath in front of the monument. On January 10, 1999, the monument was listed as the fourth batch of Heilongjiang Province's cultural relics protection sites. In 2010, the monument was declared as Harbin's fourth batch of first-class historical buildings and in 2011, it was repaired as a whole with some of its parts and the commemorative words on the monument repainted with the damaged parts of the monument completely replaced.

On May 17, 2024, during his visit to Harbin as part of his state visit to China, President of Russia Vladimir Putin laid flowers at the monument.

== Structure ==
The Soviet Red Army Monument consists of a monument top, two parts of the monument body and a monument base. It is 18 m (59 ft) high and faces east. There are two life-size sculptures of a Soviet Red Army soldier and a Soviet Navy sailor. They hold a rifle that has fallen to the ground in one hand and raise a five-pointed star with the other hand together, symbolizing victory in the war. (Note: As can be seen from the photo, the five-pointed star is similar to the Soviet military decoration Order of Victory. However, the Local Chronicles of Harbin first pointed out that it was the Soviet national emblem and then the Soviet Red Army emblem. Some local residents also recalled that earlier there was a hammer and sickle inside the five-pointed star.)

On both sides of the upper part of the monument body, there are reliefs composed of wheat ears, flags and hammer and sickle patterns. Below the relief are the numerals "3-IX-1945" (September 3, 1945), the official Soviet and present-day Russian commemoration date of VJ Day. The State Emblem of the Soviet Union is sculpted on all four sides of the lower body of the monument, and reliefs depicting Soviet troops in battle are carved on the north and south sides. The front of the monument has two inscriptions, one in Russian and the other in Chinese. The Russian inscription reads "eternal glory to the heroes who fell in battles for freedom and independence of the Union of Soviet Socialist Republics" (Russian: Вечная слава героям павшим в боях за свободу и независимость Союза Советских Социалистических Республик) while the Chinese inscription reads "the Soviet heroes who died for the independence and freedom of China in the battle to liberate Northeast China will live forever" (Chinese: 为中国的独立与自由，在解放东北作战中牺牲的苏军英雄们永垂不朽). The base of the monument is made of white granite and is surrounded by pillars connected by iron chains. There is a bronze plaque on the lower left side of the front of the base, recording the origin of the monument.
