= 2001 Sino-Russian Treaty of Friendship =

2001 treaty between China and Russia

Sino-Russian Treaty of Friendship
Treaty of Good-Neighborliness and Friendly Cooperation Between the People's Republic of China and the Russian Federation
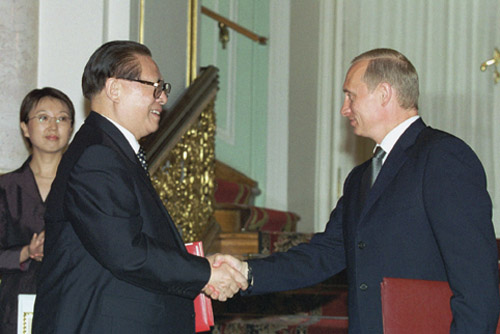
- Jiang Zemin and Vladimir Putin after signing the treaty
- Type: Treaty of friendship
- Signed: 16 July 2001
- Location: Moscow, Russia
- Effective: 28 February 2002
- Signatories: President Jiang Zemin; President Vladimir Putin
- Parties: China; Russia
- Languages: Chinese; Russian

Full text
- zh:中华人民共和国和俄罗斯联邦睦邻友好合作条约 at Wikisource

2001 Sino-Russian Treaty of Friendship

Chinese name
- Simplified Chinese: 中俄睦邻友好合作条约
- Traditional Chinese: 中俄睦鄰友好合作條約
Transcriptions
Standard Mandarin
- Hanyu Pinyin: Zhōng É mùlín Yǒuhǎo hézuò tiáoyuē
Yue: Cantonese
- Yale Romanization: jūng ngòh muhk lèuhn yáuh hóu hahp jok tiùh yeuk
- Jyutping: zung1 ngo4 muk6 leon4 jau5 hou2 hap6 zok3 tiu4 joek3

Russian name
- Russian: Договор о Добрососедстве Дружбе и Сотрудничестве Между Российской Федерацией и Китайской Народной Республикой

The Treaty of Good-Neighborliness and Friendly Cooperation Between the People's Republic of China and the Russian Federation (FCT) is a twenty-year strategic treaty between China and Russia. The treaty was signed by Chinese President Jiang Zemin and Russian President Vladimir Putin on 16 July 2001, and it came into force on 28 February 2002.

== History ==
The treaty was signed by Chinese leader Jiang Zemin and Russian President Vladimir Putin on 16 July 2001 in Moscow. The Standing Committee of the National People's Congress of China approved the treaty on 27 October 2001. It was also ratified by Russia's State Duma on 26 December 2001, the Federation Council on 16 January 2002, and by President Vladimir Putin on 25 January 2002. On 28 February 2002, Chinese Assistant Foreign Minister Liu Guchang and Russian Deputy Foreign Minister Alexander Losyukov exchanged instruments of force in Beijing, formally bringing the treaty into force.

On 28 June 2021, Russia and China extended the treaty for another 5 years after its expiration in February 2022. During Vladimir Putin's visit to China in May 2026, Russia and China agreed to extend the treaty.

== Overview ==
The treaty outlines the broad strokes which are to serve as a basis for peaceful relations, economic cooperation, as well as diplomatic and geopolitical reliance.

Article 9 of the treaty can be seen as an implicit defense pact similar to NATO's Article 5. Article 9 states "When a situation arises in which one of the contracting parties deems that peace is being threatened and undermined or its security interests are involved or when it is confronted with the threat of aggression, the contracting parties shall immediately hold contacts and consultations in order to eliminate such threats."

Other articles (A7 and A16) point at increasing military cooperation, including the sharing of "military know-how" (A16).

The treaty also encompasses a mutual, cooperative approach to environmental technology regulations and energy conservation; and toward international finance and trade. The document affirms Russia's stand on Taiwan as "an inalienable part of China" (A5), and highlights the commitment to ensure the "national unity and territorial integrity" in the two countries (A4). The treaty includes a no first use clause for the two nations against each other.

== See also ==
- Foreign relations of China
- Foreign relations of Russia
- China–Russia relations
