= 2024 state visit by Vladimir Putin to China =

2024 meeting between China and Russia's leaders

2024 Visit by Vladimir Putin to China
- Part of China–Russia relations, Russo-Ukrainian War
- Date: 16-17 May 2024
- Location: China
- Type: State visit
- Theme: Deepening strategic partnership between Russia and China
- Participants: Vladimir Putin; Xi Jinping
- Outcome: Declaration of a "new era" partnership

From 16 to 17 May 2024, Russian president Vladimir Putin made a state visit to China at the invitation of Chinese president Xi Jinping. It was Putin's first foreign trip since the start of his fifth presidential term and his second visit to China in just over six months. The visit coincided with the 75th anniversary of diplomatic relations between the two countries.

In Beijing, Putin and Xi held talks and signed a joint statement on deepening their partnership in a "new era", which opposed the United States on a range of security issues. Putin then travelled to Harbin, where he attended a China–Russia trade expo and visited the Harbin Institute of Technology, a university under United States sanctions. No agreement was reached on the proposed Power of Siberia 2 gas pipeline, and the United States said it saw nothing new in the joint statement.

== Background ==
On 25 April 2024, Putin told a congress of the Russian Union of Industrialists and Entrepreneurs in Moscow that he planned to visit China in May, which would be his first foreign trip after the presidential election in March. His inauguration for a fifth term was set for 7 May. On 14 May, the Kremlin announced that Putin would make a state visit to China on 16 and 17 May at the invitation of Xi, including talks with Premier Li Qiang and a stop in Harbin. His previous visit to China had been in October 2023, when he attended the Belt and Road Forum in Beijing.

China and Russia had declared a "no limits" partnership in February 2022, days before Russia invaded Ukraine. China had claimed neutrality in the war but had supported Russia economically, politically and rhetorically. Under Western sanctions, Russia had become increasingly dependent on China economically, and trade between the two countries reached a record US$240.1 billion in 2023. In February 2023, China had published a twelve-point position paper on a political settlement of the war, which Ukraine and its Western allies criticised.

The United States accused China of being the leading supplier of critical components for Russia's defence industry. During a visit to Beijing in April 2024, Secretary of State Antony Blinken said that "Russia would struggle to sustain its assault on Ukraine without China's support", and warned, "I made it clear that if China does not address this problem, we will." On 1 May, the United States imposed sanctions on 20 companies based in China and Hong Kong as part of nearly 300 new Russia-related designations. Among them were two Chinese suppliers that the United States Department of the Treasury said had sent Russia explosive precursors used to make gunpowder and rocket propellants.

In an interview with Xinhua published on 15 May, Putin said that the "unprecedented level of strategic partnership between our countries" had determined his choice of China. He praised China's position paper on Ukraine as reflecting "the genuine desire of our Chinese friends to help stabilize the situation".

== Visit ==
=== Beijing ===
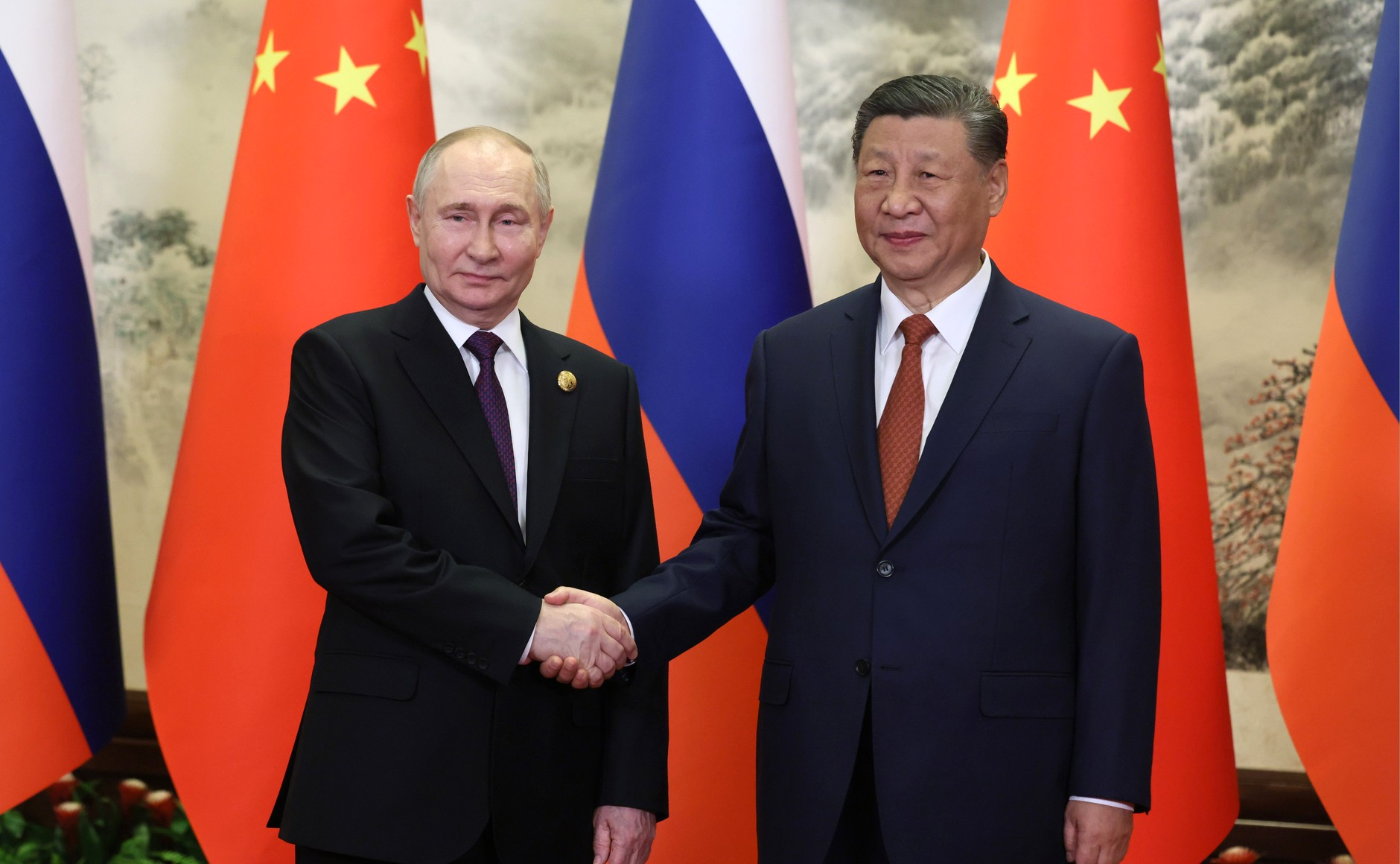
Putin and Xi at their talks in Beijing

Putin arrived in Beijing early on 16 May. His delegation included First Deputy Prime Minister Denis Manturov, five deputy prime ministers, central bank governor Elvira Nabiullina, finance minister Anton Siluanov, foreign minister Sergey Lavrov, defence minister Andrey Belousov, Security Council secretary Sergei Shoigu and presidential aide Yury Ushakov. Business leaders including Igor Sechin, Herman Gref, Andrey Kostin and Gennady Timchenko also travelled with him. Belousov was the newly appointed defence minister. The head of Gazprom, Alexei Miller, did not join the trip, and the company said he was holding talks with Iranian officials.

Xi held a welcome ceremony for Putin in the square outside the east gate of the Great Hall of the People. The two leaders reviewed an honour guard of the People's Liberation Army, the national anthems of both countries were played, a 21-gun salute was fired in Tiananmen Square, and children waved flowers and Chinese and Russian flags.

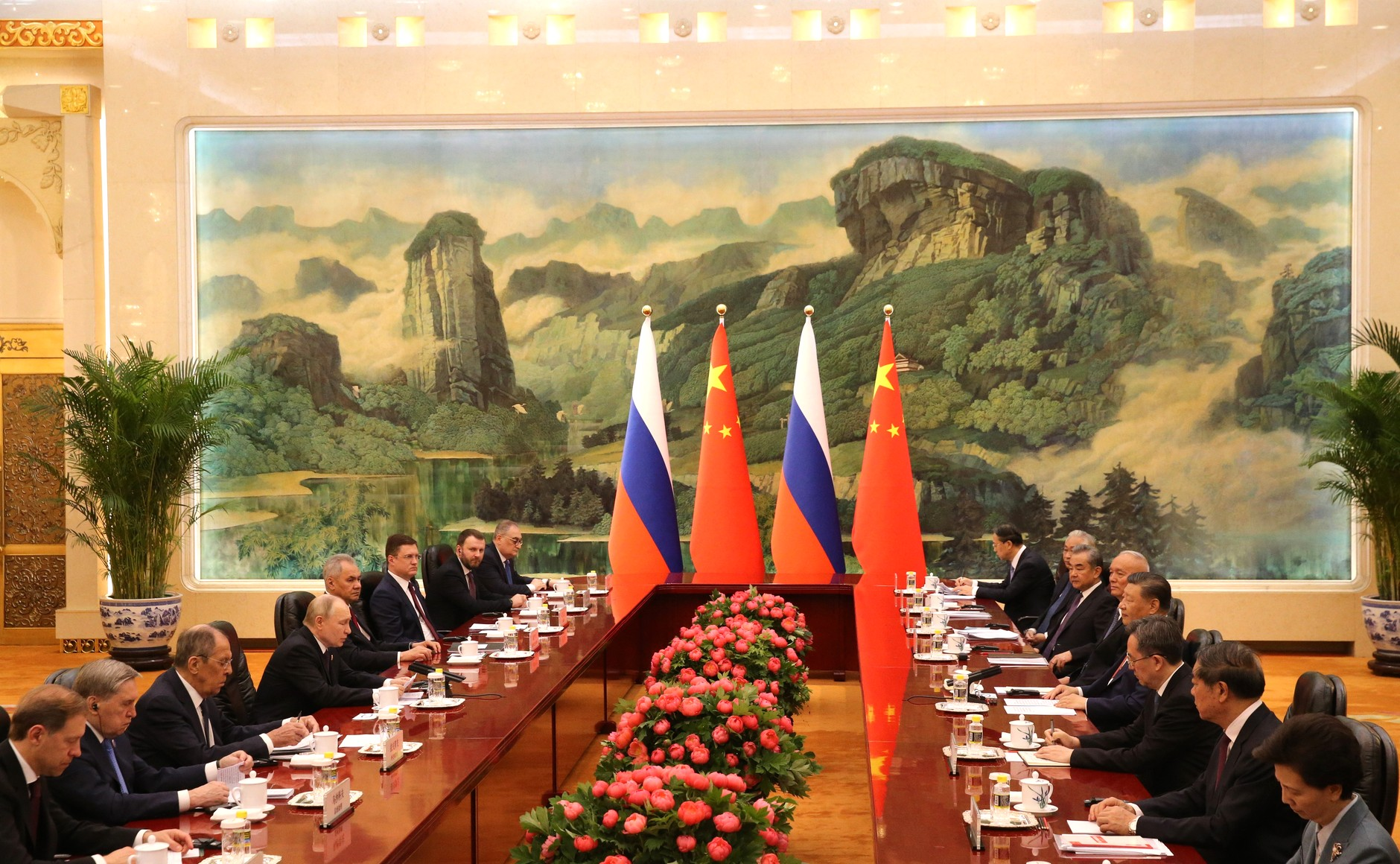
Expanded talks between the Russian and Chinese delegations

The leaders first held talks in a small format, followed by expanded talks with their delegations. Putin called the initial talks "warm and comradely". He said that relations between Russia and China were not directed against any third party. He also thanked Xi for China's proposals on ending the war in Ukraine, saying, "we appreciate the initiative of our Chinese colleagues and friends to regulate the situation." After the talks, the two leaders signed the joint statement and witnessed the signing of cooperation documents on trade, nature conservation, inspection and quarantine, and the media. They then made statements to the press.

At noon, Xi hosted a welcome banquet in the Golden Hall of the Great Hall of the People. According to TASS, the dishes served to the Russian delegation included Peking duck, and a People's Liberation Army band played pieces including the Soviet wartime song "Blue Kerchief". Cai Qi, Ding Xuexiang, Wang Yi, He Lifeng, Zhang Guoqing and Shen Yiqin attended the day's events.

Putin laid a wreath at the Monument to the People's Heroes in Tiananmen Square. In the afternoon, he met Li Qiang at the Great Hall of the People, with Wu Zhenglong also attending. Later that afternoon, Xi and Putin opened the 2024–2025 China–Russia Years of Culture at a concert marking the 75th anniversary of diplomatic relations at the National Centre for the Performing Arts, where both leaders spoke to about 1,000 guests. In his speech, Putin said that the Russian and Chinese peoples were like brothers, and he quoted the 1949 song "Moscow–Beijing", which was written for Joseph Stalin's 70th birthday and Mao Zedong's visit to Moscow.

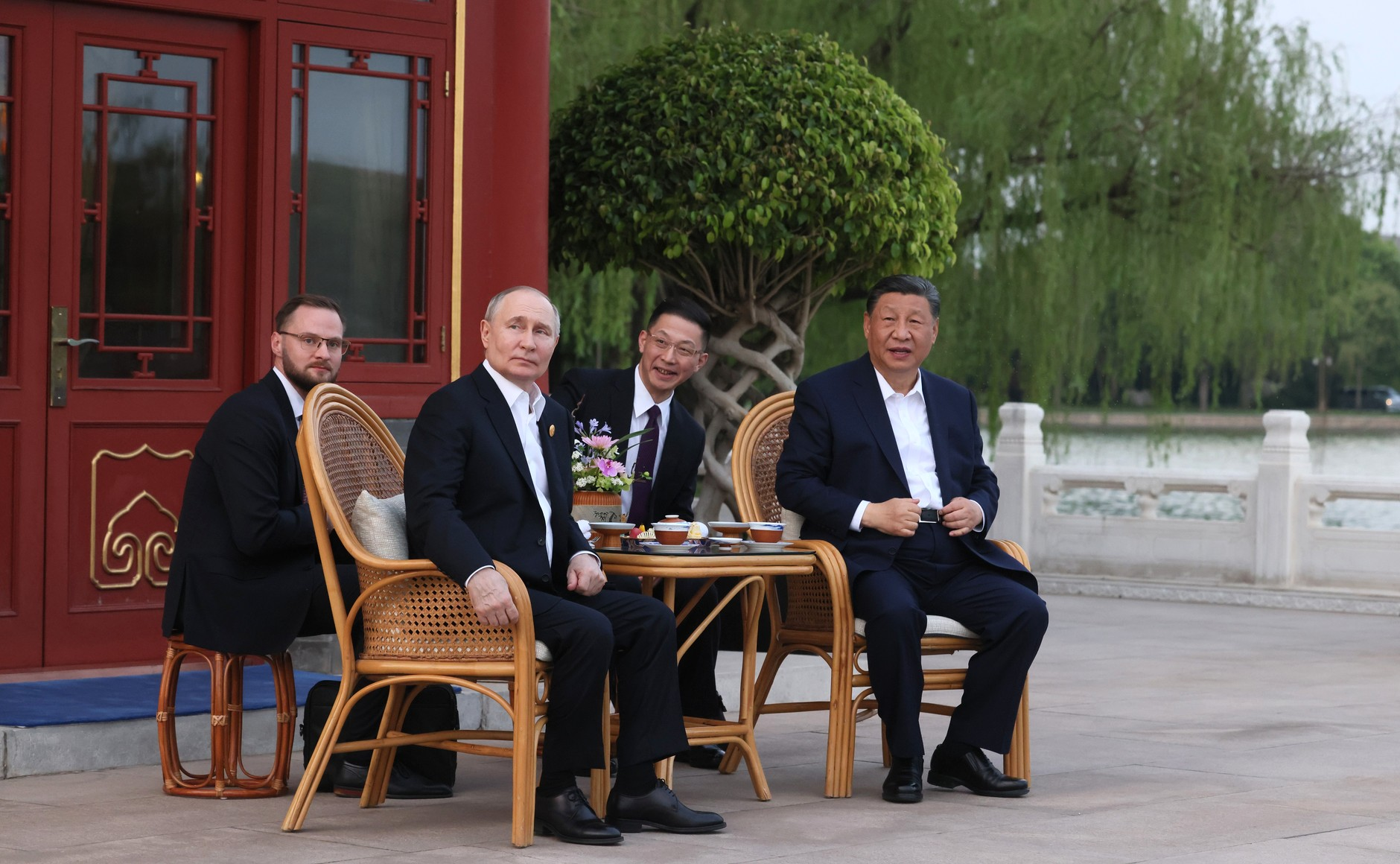
Putin and Xi drinking tea at Zhongnanhai

In the evening, Xi received Putin at Yingtai in the Zhongnanhai leadership compound, where the two walked through the grounds and drank tea by the water while discussing strategic issues, including the war in Ukraine. Cai Qi and Wang Yi were also present. According to the Chinese account, Xi said that the fundamental way to resolve the crisis was to build a balanced, effective and sustainable new security architecture, and Putin said that Russia was committed to a political solution through negotiations. The informal tea and dinner was regarded as the key session of the visit, and at its end Xi hugged Putin twice, in an embrace that Reuters described as rare. Putin then flew to Harbin.

=== Harbin ===
Harbin, the capital of Heilongjiang province, was once nicknamed "Little Moscow" and had tens of thousands of ethnic Russian residents, many of them railway settlers or refugees from the Russian Civil War. On 17 May, Putin laid flowers at the monument to Soviet soldiers who fought for China against Japan in the Second Sino-Japanese War. Goose-stepping Chinese soldiers flanked him during the ceremony.

He then attended the opening ceremony of the eighth China–Russia Expo with Vice President Han Zheng, who read out a congratulatory letter from Xi. The ceremony also opened the fourth Russian–Chinese Interregional Cooperation Forum. In his speech, Putin said that Russia was "ready and able to continuously power the Chinese economy". He said that the partnership reliably ensured energy security, that cooperation between the Russian Far East and Northeast China had great potential, and that Kaluga Oblast wanted to develop cooperation in the car industry. He also invited Chinese partners to the Eastern Economic Forum in Vladivostok in September. Putin and Han then met and toured the exhibition together.

Putin visited the Church of the Intercession, which was built in 1930 and is the only functioning Orthodox church in Harbin. There he lit candles and presented the parish with an icon of the Saviour Not Made by Hands.

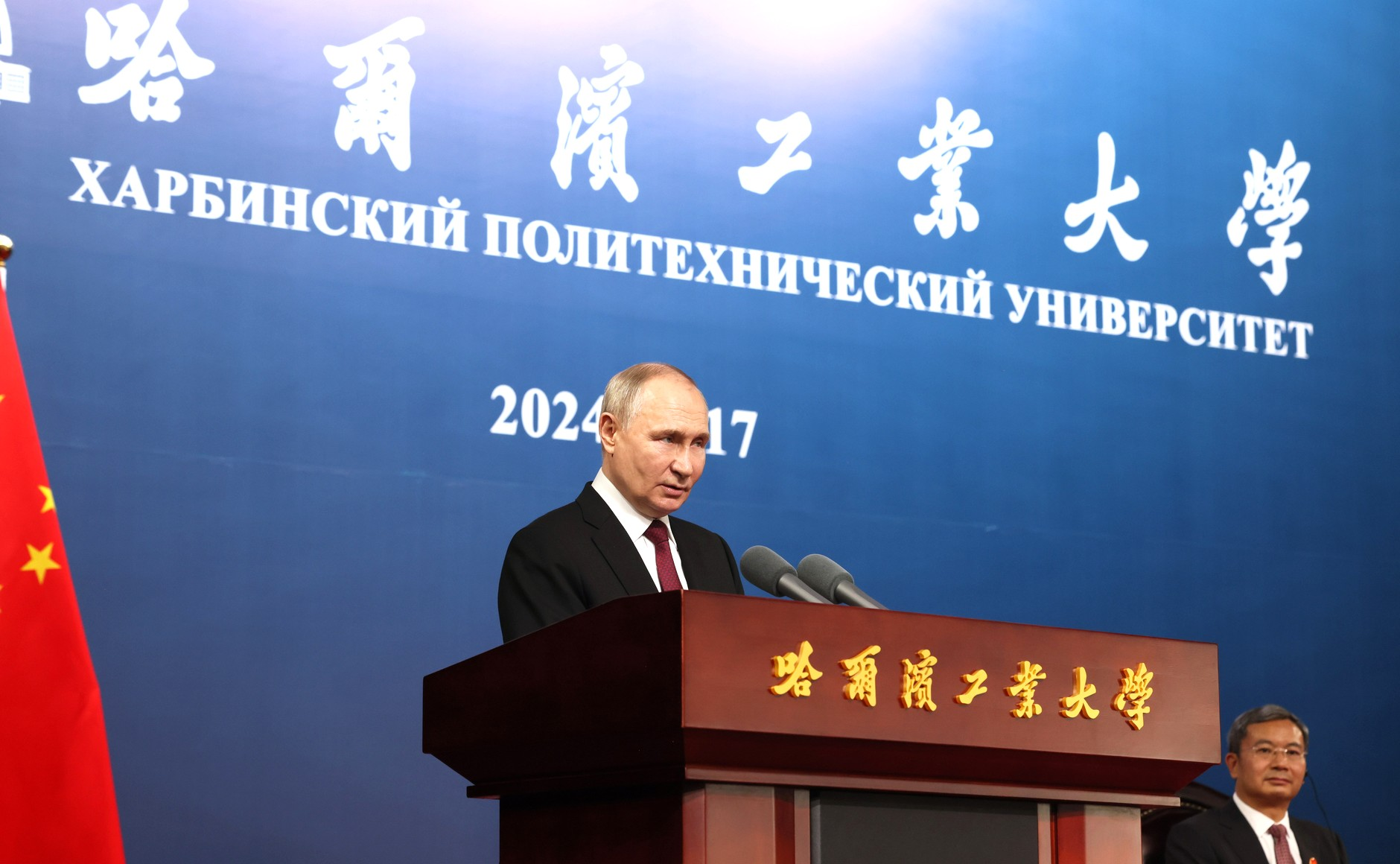
Putin meeting students and teachers at the Harbin Institute of Technology

He also visited the Harbin Institute of Technology. The university is one of the "Seven Sons of National Defence", which have deep links to China's defence industry, and the United States sanctioned it in 2020 over its alleged role in procuring items for the Chinese military. Putin met students there and announced that the institute and his alma mater, Saint Petersburg State University, would open a joint school for 1,500 students, saying, "I'm sure that it will become a flagship of the Russian-Chinese cooperation in science and education."

=== Press conference ===
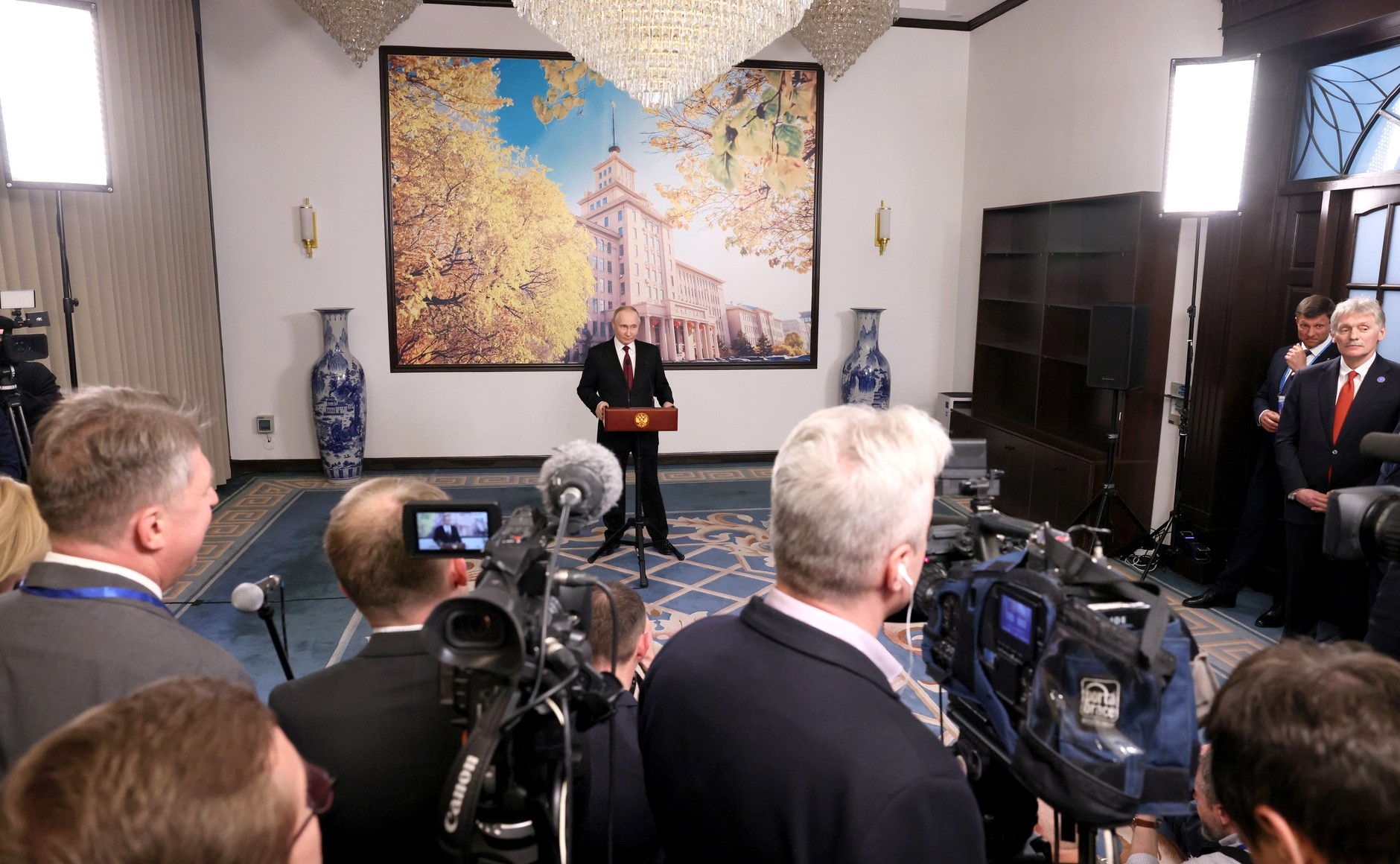
Putin at his press conference in Harbin

Before leaving Harbin, Putin held a press conference. He described his talks with Xi as "substantive" and said that the partnership "is not directed against anyone". On Russia's offensive in Kharkiv Oblast, he blamed Ukrainian shelling of residential areas in Russian border regions, including Belgorod. He said, "if this continues, we will be forced to create a security zone, a buffer zone." Asked whether Russia intended to capture Kharkiv, he said that "there are no such plans as of today".

Putin said that China was "sincerely seeking to resolve this problem". He criticised the peace conference that Switzerland was due to host in June without Russia, saying of its organisers, "they want to present us with this ultimatum". He said that Xi had raised the call by French president Emmanuel Macron for an Olympic Truce during the Paris Olympics. Putin rejected it, citing the ban on Russian athletes competing under their country's flag, and said, "They are violating those principles with respect to us, but they want us to follow the same principles as they dictate them to us." On Volodymyr Zelenskyy, whose term was due to expire on 20 May, Putin said that peace documents had to be signed with legitimate authorities and that the Constitutional Court of Ukraine should decide the question.

According to Reuters, Putin and his hosts confirmed their interest in the Power of Siberia 2 gas pipeline, although the two countries had not agreed to build it. Putin said that "it's possible to lay both a gas pipeline and an oil pipeline in the same corridor". He said that he understood the caution of Chinese banks, since nobody wanted to fall under sanctions. He described Belousov as one of the best economists in Russia and said that he should open the defence ministry to innovation. Putin also said that Xi had treated him to Peking duck and that he had been unable to resist a second piece. He apologised to Harbin residents for the traffic jams caused by the security measures for his visit, saying, "Sorry, please. We'll be leaving soon."

== Joint statement ==
The joint statement was issued to mark the 75th anniversary of diplomatic relations between China and Russia. It said that their relationship went beyond the military-political alliances of the Cold War era and was based on non-alignment, non-confrontation and not targeting any third party. It said that the United States "still thinks in terms of the Cold War" and must "abandon this behaviour". The two countries opposed what the statement called hegemonic US attempts to change the balance of power in Northeast Asia by expanding its military forces and forming military blocs. They also expressed serious concern about the AUKUS partnership and accused the United States of deploying land-based intermediate-range missile systems in the Asia-Pacific. The statement condemned moves to seize the assets of foreign states, a reference to Western measures against frozen Russian assets, and announced plans to step up military ties.

On Taiwan, Russia reaffirmed its adherence to the one-China principle, recognised Taiwan as an inalienable part of the People's Republic of China and opposed any form of Taiwan independence. On Ukraine, the statement said that a sustainable settlement required the elimination of the "root causes" of the crisis, and it opposed a drawn-out conflict. Russia praised what the statement called China's objective and impartial position, and welcomed China's willingness to play a constructive role in resolving the crisis through political and diplomatic means. The statement called for cooperation in oil, natural gas, liquefied natural gas, coal and electricity on market principles.

== Analysis ==
The Associated Press described the visit as "largely symbolic". Euronews reported that both leaders regarded Western efforts to spread democracy as an attempt to delegitimise them, and that they believed authoritarian regimes were better suited to the challenges of the modern world. The Russian sinologist Alexei Chigadaev told Novaya Gazeta Europe that the large delegation was meant to demonstrate the partnership rather than to conclude business deals.

On 2 June, the Financial Times reported that negotiations on Power of Siberia 2 had stalled because China wanted prices close to Russia's subsidised domestic prices and would commit to buying only a small fraction of the pipeline's planned capacity of about 50 billion cubic metres a year. It described the pipeline as one of the main reasons for Putin's trip. Alexander Gabuev of the Carnegie Russia Eurasia Center told the newspaper that "China believes time's on its side".

== Reactions ==
US State Department spokesman Vedant Patel said that "the People's Republic of China can't have its cake and eat it too", and that China could not seek better relations with Europe while fuelling Russia's war. He added, "From our point of view, the solution is simple – the Russian Federation can just leave Ukraine." White House press secretary Karine Jean-Pierre said that the United States did not "see anything new" in the joint statement, and added, "We find it unacceptable that Chinese companies are helping Putin wage this war against Ukraine."

In an interview with Agence France-Presse on 17 May, Zelenskyy urged China to attend the peace summit in Switzerland, saying that "they have influence on Russia". He said that Xi had assured him by telephone that China supported Ukraine's territorial integrity, and added, "They support, but what they will do, we are yet to see."

== See also ==
- 2023 visit by Xi Jinping to Russia
- China–Russia relations
- China and the Russian invasion of Ukraine
- List of international trips made by Vladimir Putin
- 2025 state visit by Xi Jinping to Russia
