= 2025 state visit by Xi Jinping to Russia =

2025 meeting between China and Russia's leaders

- Part of China–Russia relations
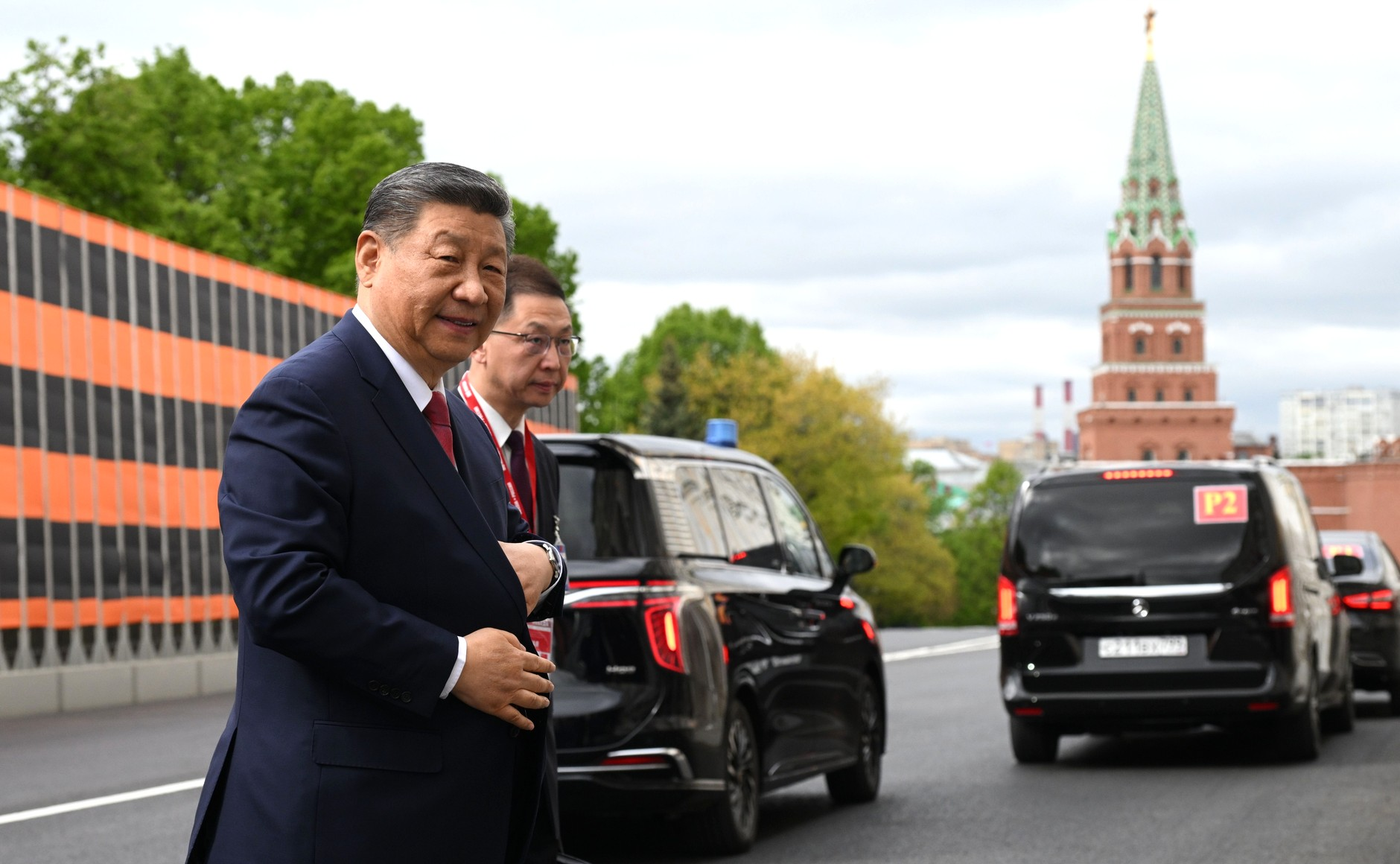
- Chinese leader Xi Jinping arrives at the Kremlin
- Date: 7–10 May 2025
- Location: Moscow, Russia
- Type: State visit
- Participants: Russian president Vladimir Putin; Chinese leader Xi Jinping; CCP chief of staff Cai Qi; CCP foreign chief Wang Yi

From 5 to 10 May 2025, Xi Jinping, the general secretary of the Chinese Communist Party and the president of China, paid a state visit to Russia and attended the 2025 Victory Day Parade in Moscow. Xi Jinping was accompanied by CCP General Office director Cai Qi and foreign minister Wang Yi. This is the second time Xi Jinping attended the Moscow Victory Day Parade on May 9 since 2015.

== The visit ==
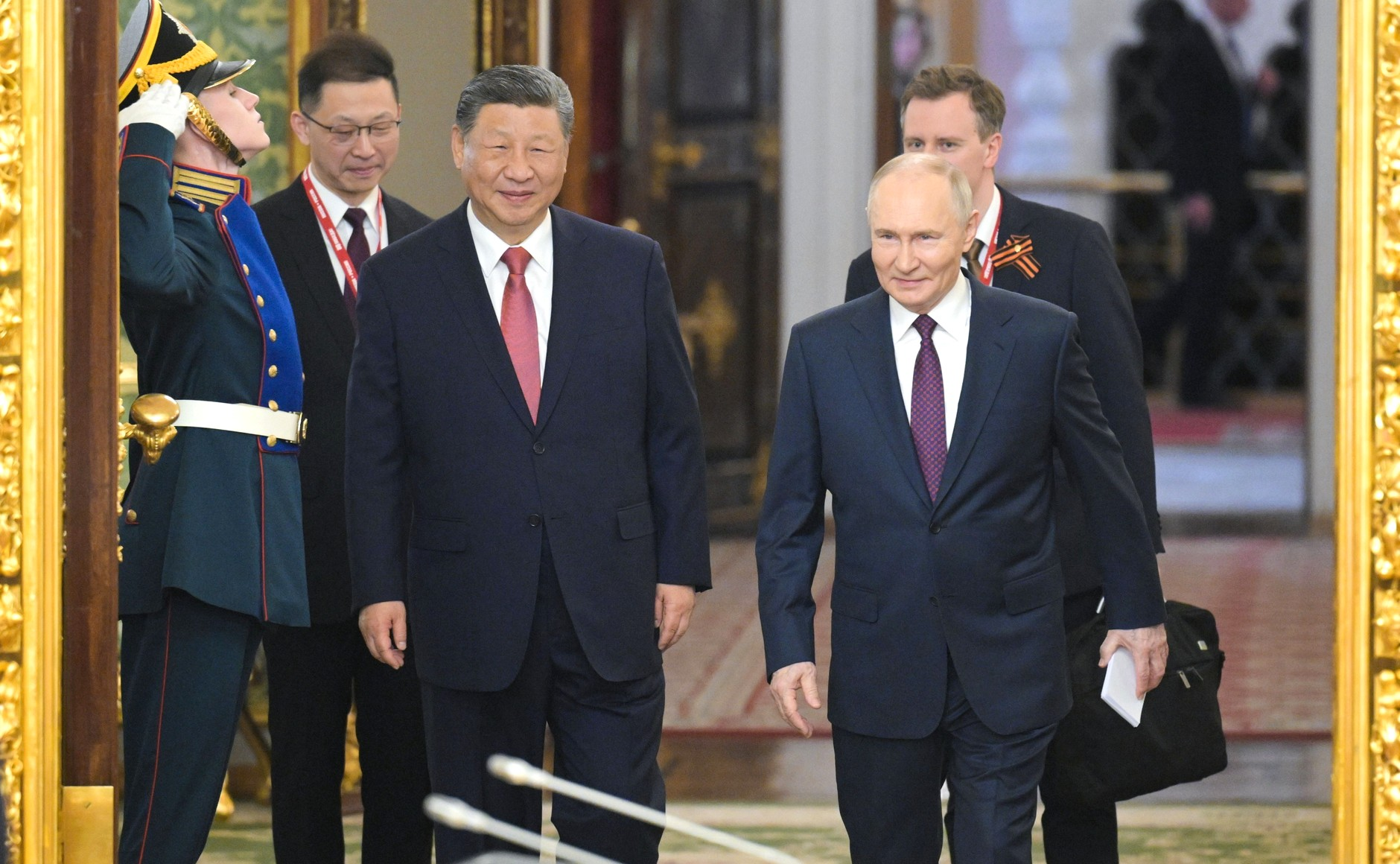
On 8 May, Xi Jinping and Vladimir Putin held high-level talks at the Kremlin in Moscow.

On 7 May 2025, Chinese leader Xi Jinping arrived in Russia by a special plane, where he was greeted by Russian Deputy Prime Minister Tatyana Golikova and several high-ranking officials. At Vnukovo International Airport, Xi gave a speech, saying that he would have in-depth exchanges with Russian President Vladimir Putin on "bilateral relations, pragmatic cooperation, and international and regional issues of common concern, injecting strong impetus into the development of the China-Russia comprehensive strategic partnership of coordination for a new era". He said that "looked forward to joining leaders of many countries and the Russian people in deeply commemorating the martyrs who bravely sacrificed themselves for the victory in the World Anti-Fascist War and jointly issuing a strong call to uphold international fairness and justice".

On the morning of 8 May, Xi Jinping and Vladimir Putin held talks at the Kremlin in Moscow. The two sides said they conducted comprehensive consultations on China–Russia relations and major international and regional issues, and reached a consensus to firmly promote strategic cooperation, promote the continuous and stable development of bilateral relations, and move towards a healthier and higher-quality level. The two leaders also pledged to "jointly uphold the correct understanding of the history of World War II, defend the authority and international status of the United Nations, and strive to safeguard global fairness and justice". After the meeting, the two sides signed the Joint Statement of the People's Republic of China and the Russian Federation on Further Deepening the Comprehensive Strategic Partnership of Coordination in the New Era on the Occasion of the 80th Anniversary of the Victory of the Chinese People's War of Resistance Against Japanese Aggression, the Soviet Patriotic War and the Founding of the United Nations.

The two leaders also witnessed the signing of more than 20 bilateral cooperation agreements covering areas such as global strategic stability, implementation of international law, biosecurity, investment protection, digital economy, quarantine and film production. Subsequently, Xi and Putin met with reporters.

=== 2025 Moscow Victory Day Parade ===
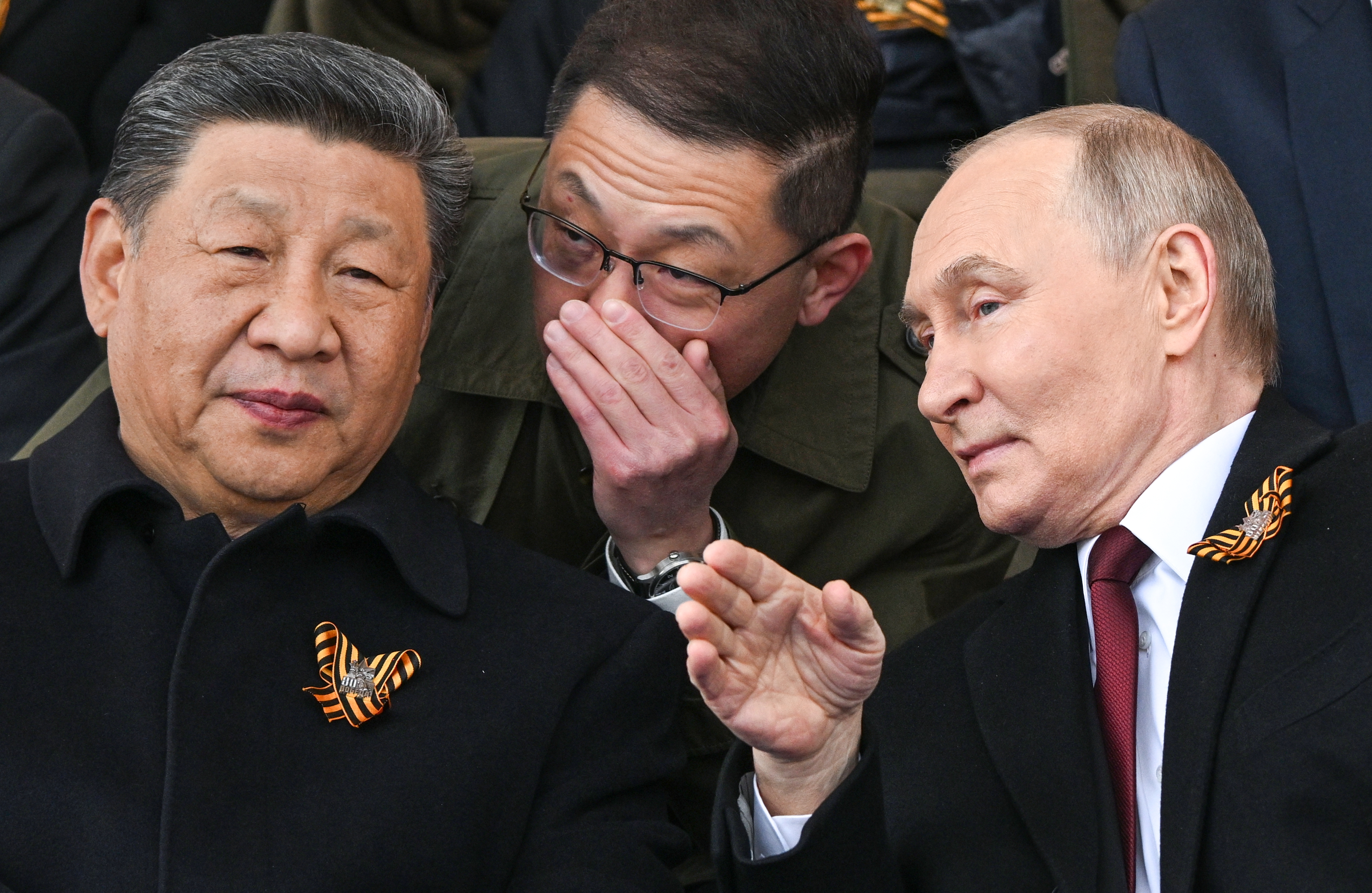
Xi Jinping and Vladimir Putin watching the 2025 Moscow Victory Day Parade.

On 9 May, Xi Jinping attended the 2025 Moscow Victory Day Parade. Armies from more than ten countries, including China, were also invited to participate in the parade. After the ceremony, Xi and other leaders went from Red Square to Alexander Garden to lay wreaths at the Tomb of the Unknown Soldier. At noon, Xi attended a banquet held by President Putin to commemorate the 80th anniversary of the Soviet Union's victory in the Great Patriotic War. Xi also met with Serbian President Aleksandar Vučić, Myanmar leader Min Aung Hlaing, Cuban President Miguel Díaz-Canel, Slovak Prime Minister Robert Fico, and Venezuelan President Nicolás Maduro.

On the evening of 10 May, Xi returned to Beijing after concluding his state visit to Russia. He was accompanied by Cai Qi, director of the General Office of the CCP Central Committee, Wang Yi, director of the Office of the Central Foreign Affairs Commission and foreign minister, and other personnel.

== See also ==
- 2025 China Victory Day Parade
- 2026 state visit by Vladimir Putin to China
