= Embassy of Russia, Beijing =

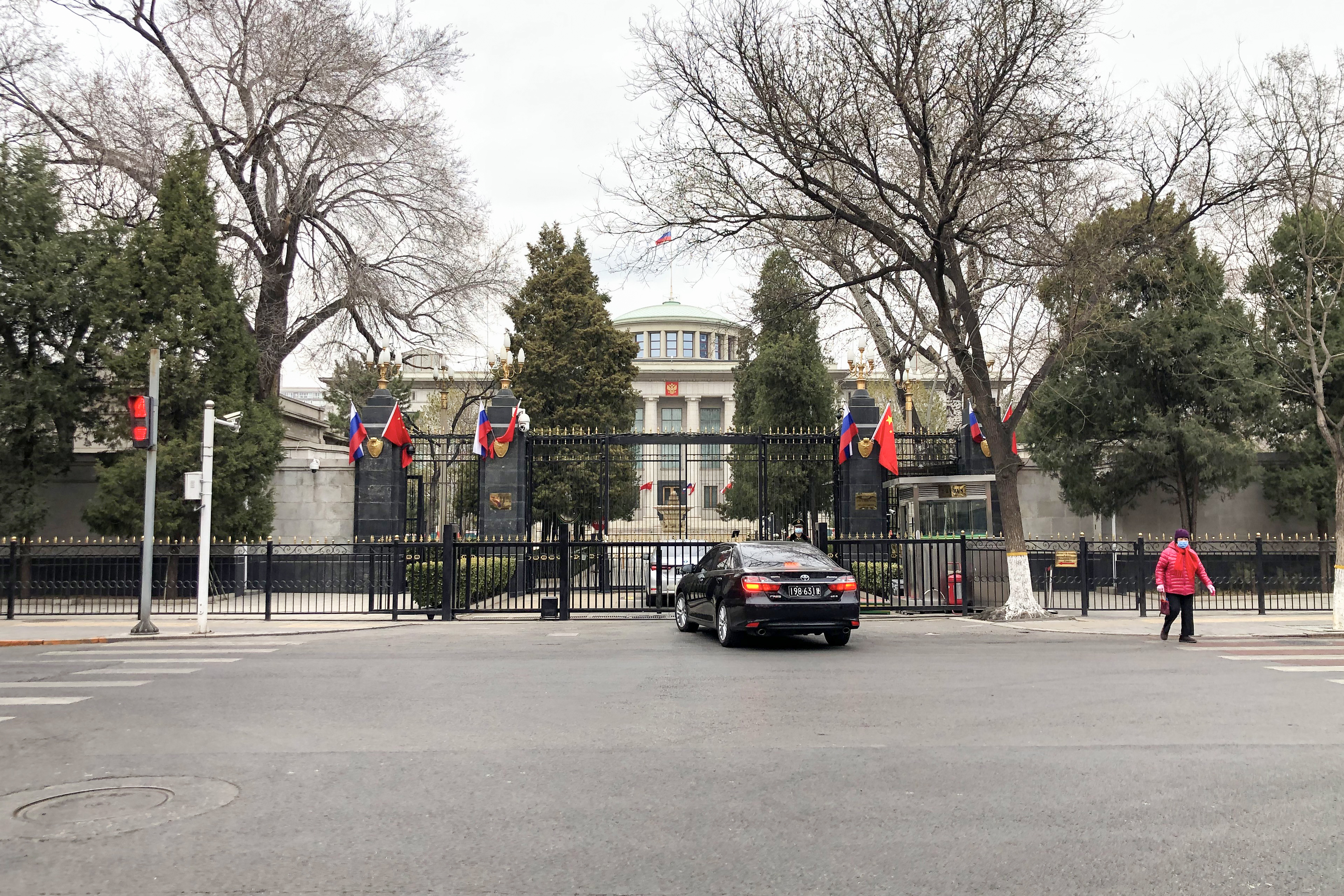

- Location within Beijing Embassy of Russia, Beijing (China)
- Location: Dongcheng District, Beijing, China
- Address: 4 Beizhong Street, Dongzhimen, Beixinqiao, Dongcheng District, Beijing
- Coordinates: 39°56′40″N 116°25′22″E
- Ambassador: Igor Morgulov

The Embassy of Russia in Beijing is the diplomatic mission of the Russian Federation to the People's Republic of China. It is also the successor to the Soviet Embassy in Beijing.

== History ==
In 1861, the first permanent Russian diplomatic mission was established in Beijing. The mission was located in Dongcheng District today, and was one of the largest embassies in the world. It was also only one of two embassies that is not located in Beijing's Embassy District, with the other being the embassy of Luxembourg.

In August 1966 the Soviet Ministry of Foreign Affairs sent the first of several notes to the Chinese embassy in Moscow protesting aggressive Chinese behavior near the Soviet embassy in Beijing. On 25 January 1967, the Chinese visiting the Lenin Mausoleum on Moscow Red Square jumped over a barrier and began chanting Mao quotes. Then one Chinese allegedly hit a Soviet woman, and a scuffle took place. After this incident new outrages against the Soviet embassy in Beijing began, sometimes described as a siege. The threat of physical danger caused the Soviets to evacuate women and children from their embassy in Beijing in February 1967. Even as the women and children were boarding the plane, they were harassed by hostile Red Guards.

Besides the main embassy in Beijing, Russia also has five other consulates in China, located in Hong Kong, Shenyang, Shanghai, Guangzhou, and Harbin.

The current ambassador is Igor Morgulov, and has been appointed at his post since September 2022.

== List of Russian diplomatic missions in China ==
- Consulate General of Russia, Hong Kong：Wan Chai, Hong Kong
- Consulate General of Russia, Shenyang: Heping District, Shenyang
- Consulate General of Russia, Shanghai：Hongkou District, Shanghai
- Consulate General of Russia, Guangzhou：Tianhe District, Guangzhou
- Consulate General of Russia, Harbin: Daoli District, Harbin

== Controversy ==
On July 2, 2020, the Russian Embassy posted a post on Weibo commemorating the 160th anniversary of the founding of Vladivostok, and specified the meaning of the city name as "conquering the East". The city was part of the territory ceded to Western nations by the Qing dynasty's Convention of Peking, an unequal treaty, and enraged Chinese netizens. The embassy deleted the post the next day, and reposted the commemoration without the detailing of name's origin.

== See also ==
- China-Russia Relations
- Embassy of China, Moscow
