= Russian Chinese =

Chinese Russian or Russian Chinese may refer to:

- Sino-Russian relations (cf. "a Chinese-Russian treaty")

Language

- Kyakhta Russian-Chinese Pidgin
- Russian methods for writing the Chinese language:
  - Cyrillization of Chinese
  - Latinxua Sin Wenz
- Dungan language, a Sinitic language spoken in Russia by the Dungan people

People and ethnic groups

- Ethnic Chinese in Russia
- Dungan people, descendants of Hui from China who migrated to the Russian Empire
- Ethnic Russians in China
  - Harbin Russians
  - Shanghai Russians
  - Russians in Hong Kong
  - Albazin Cossacks, Russian soldiers captured by Qing dynasty forces in 1685 and resettled near Beijing
- People with dual citizenship of China and Russia

== See also ==
- Sino-Russian War (disambiguation)
- Chinese Soviet (disambiguation)
