= Chinese Soviet Republic (disambiguation) =

The Chinese Soviet Republic was a government of China proclaimed by the Chinese Communist Party in 1931 during the Chinese Civil War. It can also refer to:

- The Hailufeng Soviet, the first Chinese Soviet, established in November 1927 on the Guangdong coast
- The Jiangxi Soviet, the largest component of the Chinese Soviet Republic

== See also ==
- Chinese Soviet (disambiguation)
