= Sino-Soviet War =

The Sino-Soviet War may refer to:

- Sino-Soviet conflict (1929), minor armed conflict over a railway in 1929
- Sino-Soviet border conflict, military conflict in 1969

== See also ==
- Sino-Soviet split, conflict between communist blocs
- Sino-Russian War (disambiguation)
- Chinese Soviet (disambiguation)
