= Sino-Soviet treaty =

Sino-Soviet treaty may refer to these treaties between the Soviet Union (USSR) and China:

- Sino-Soviet Non-Aggression Pact in 1937, between the Republic of China (ROC) and USSR
- Sino-Soviet Treaty of Friendship and Alliance in 1945, ROC and Soviet Union
- Sino-Soviet Treaty of Friendship, Alliance and Mutual Assistance in 1950, between the People's Republic of China (PRC) and USSR
- 1991 Sino-Soviet Border Agreement, between the PRC and USSR

== See also ==
- Chinese Soviet (disambiguation)
- {{Sino-Russian treaties}}
