= Russia's turn to the East =

Russia's turn to the East (Russian: Поворот российской политики на восток) is a change of foreign policy strategy of the Russian Federation at the beginning of the 21st century, associated with a partial foreign economic reorientation towards the countries of Asia.

The goals of the turn were: to occupy a proper economic and political place in the Asia-Pacific region, to improve the balance of foreign trade, which is overly oriented towards Europe, and, from 2014, to weaken the effect of economic sanctions. The turn implies Russia's abandonment of unsuccessful attempts to integrate into the Euro-Atlantic system (which began after the end of the Cold War), the preference for ties with the "non-West" and includes both the development of the Russian Far East and cooperation with Asian countries.

Worsening in the 2010s relations with the West have accelerated these processes, and sanctions are often seen as a necessary boost to Russia's long-overdue transformation into a Eurasian power. Debate—and criticism of the government—in the political and expert communities centers on the ways and means of the turnaround; there is no debate about its necessity; many believe that Russian problems cannot be solved in the West. Sanctions have also made it easier for the government to work with the public: turn to the East is perceived as natural, and attempts to cooperate with the West are perceived as a sign of weakness. At the same time, the perception of China as a friendly country has sharply increased.

All major political parties (with the exception of the ruling United Russia in the 2010s) take anti-American positions; this absence of a pro-Western opposition also simplifies the change.

The leading partner in the turn is China, with which cooperation takes place in many areas: energy, industrial, financial, and military. At the same time, Russia is trying to balance relations with China by strengthening cooperation with South Korea, North Korea and, if possible, with Japan (whose rapprochement with Russia is hindered by a close alliance with the United States).

== See also ==
- Why Russia is not America
