= Sino-Russian War =

Sino-Russian War or Russo-Chinese War may refer to:

- Sino-Russian border conflicts (1652–1689)
- Russian invasion of Manchuria (1900), part of the Boxer War

== See also ==
- Russian Chinese (disambiguation)
- Sino-Soviet War (disambiguation)
