= Chinese Soviet =

Chinese Soviet or Soviet Chinese may refer to:

- Chinese Soviet Republic
- Sino-Soviet relations
- Individual Chinese people in the Soviet Union, or the soviets which represented them there; see:
  - Dungan people
  - Chinese people in Soviet Russia
- Languages of Chinese people in the Soviet Union
  - Dungan language
  - Latinxua Sin Wenz script, the Soviet-invented alphabet for writing Chinese

== See also ==
- Chinese Soviet Republic (disambiguation)
- Sino-Soviet treaty (disambiguation)
- Sino-Soviet War (disambiguation)
- Russian Chinese (disambiguation)
