= Consulate General of Russia, Shanghai =

Coordinates: 31.2458°N 121.4864°E

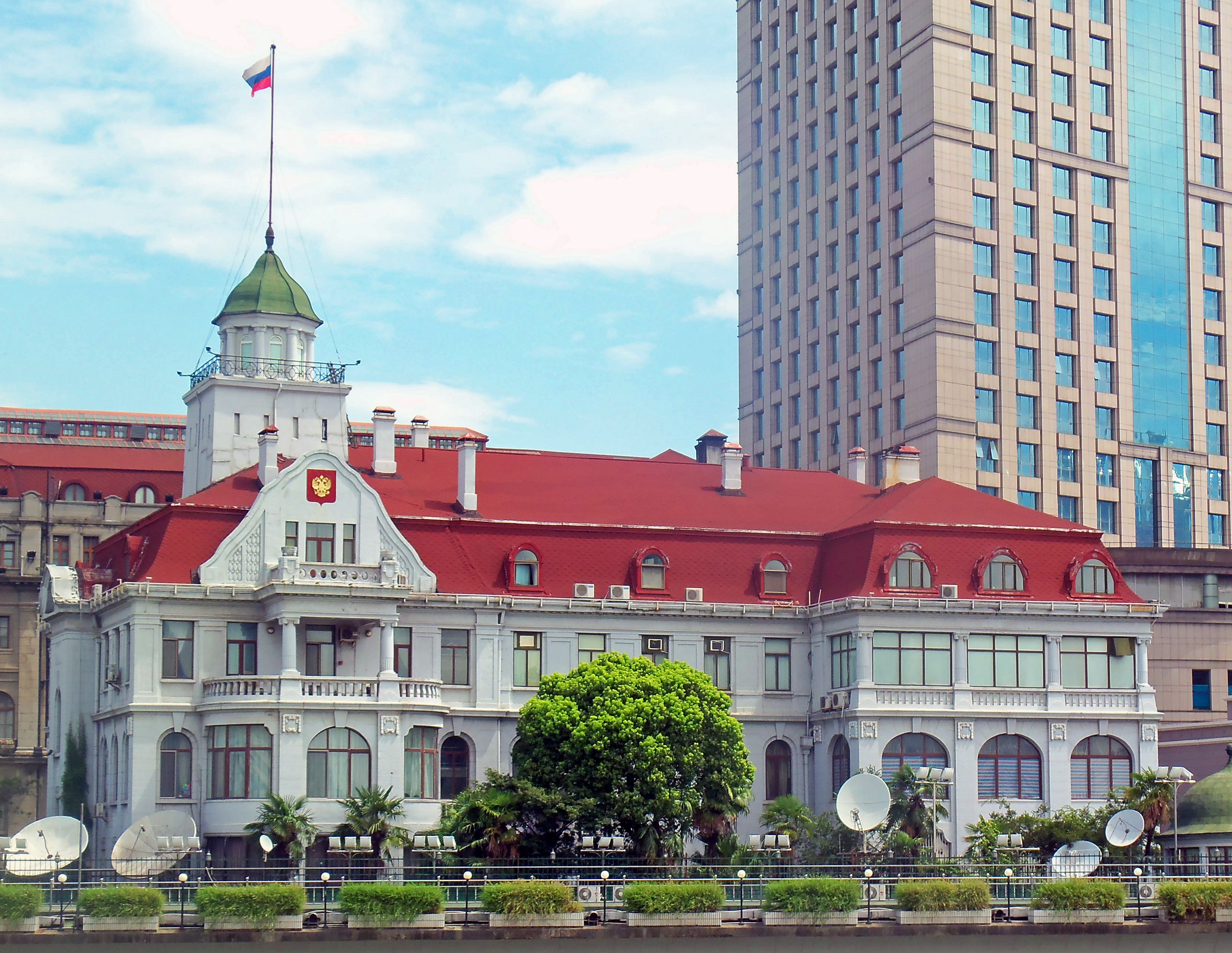
Consulate-General of Russia in Shanghai, rear elevation, facing Suzhou Creek

The Consulate-General of the Russian Federation in Shanghai is the diplomatic mission of Russia in Hongkou District, Shanghai. It is located at 20 Huangpu Road on The Bund in Shanghai, next to the Garden Bridge near the convergence of the Suzhou and Huangpu rivers, and across the road from the Astor House Hotel. It was established in 1896 and has occupied the present building since 1917.

The Russian Consulate School in Shanghai, an overseas primary school operated by the Russian Foreign Affairs Ministry, is on the consulate grounds.

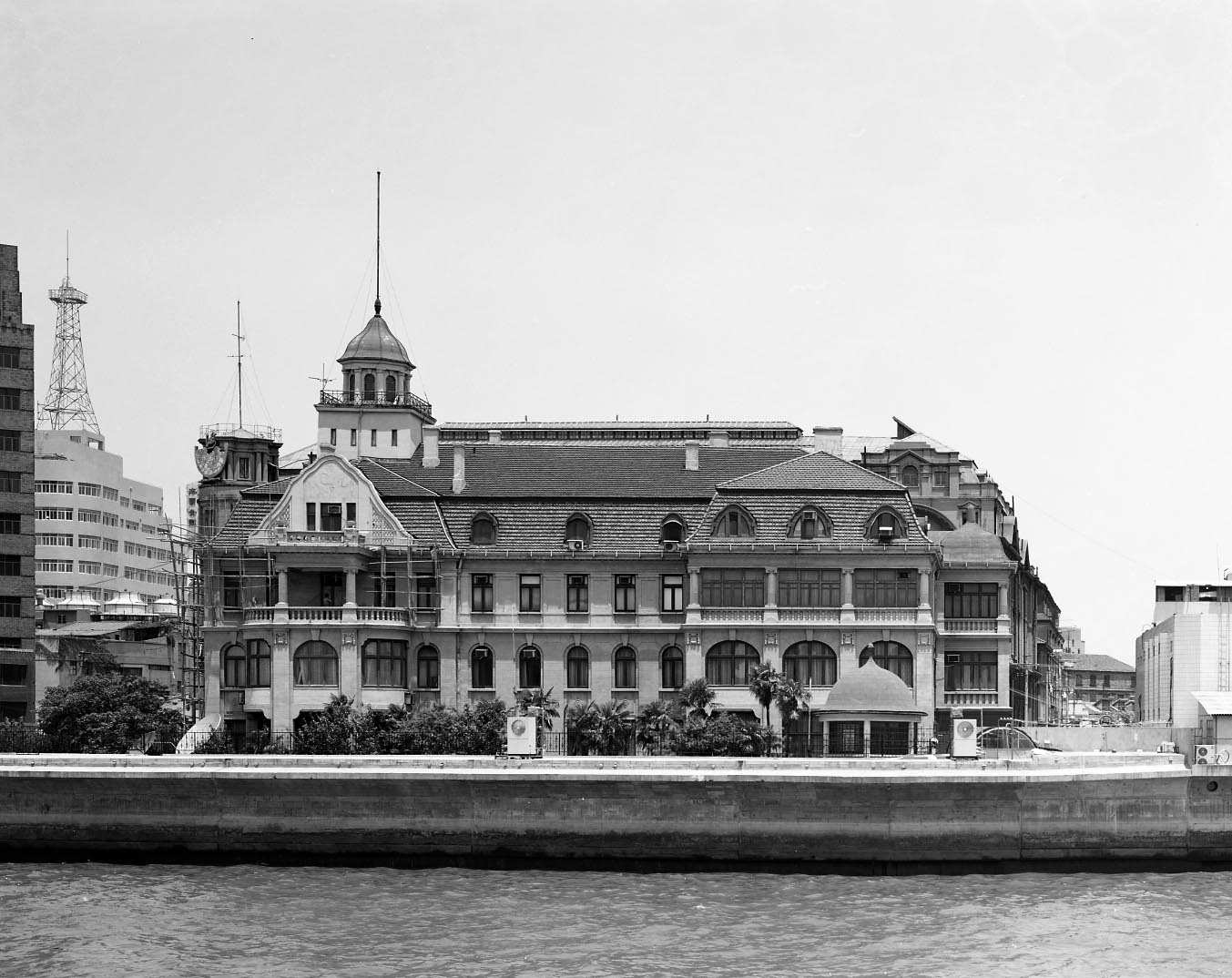
The consulate in 1994

== See also ==
- China–Russia relations
- Shanghai Russians
- List of diplomatic missions in China
