= China–Russia relations =

- China: Russia

Diplomatic mission
- Chinese Embassy, Moscow: Russian Embassy, Beijing

Envoy
- Ambassador Zhang Hanhui: Ambassador Igor Morgulov

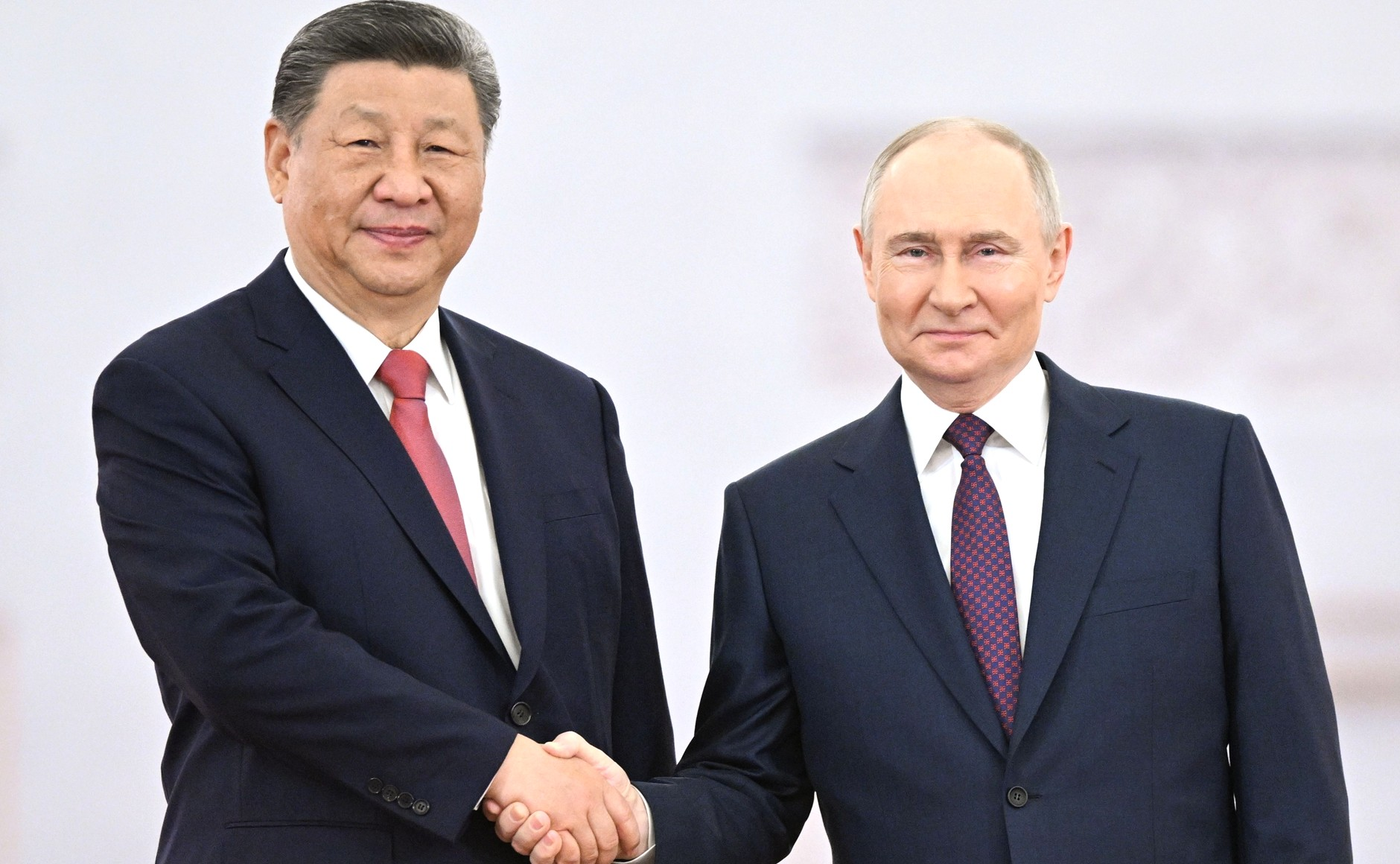
Russian president Vladimir Putin with Chinese leader Xi Jinping during a state visit to Moscow for the 2025 Victory Day Parade, May 2025

China and Russia share one of the world's most important foreign relationships. (Note: Territories under the control of the Republic of China (ROC) – Taiwan, Penghu, Kinmen and Matsu Islands – are recognised by the Russian Federation as part of the PRC.) The two nations share interest in energy cooperation, military ties, and geopolitical alignment in challenging the collective West at large, including the United States.

Relations between China and Russia go back to the 16th century. Though initially allies during the Cold War, China and the Soviet Union were rivals after the Sino-Soviet split in 1961. After the dissolution of the Soviet Union in 1991, China and Russia established diplomatic relations, with the relationship strengthening significantly afterwards. The two countries share a land border which was demarcated in 1991, and they signed the Treaty of Good-Neighborliness and Friendly Cooperation in 2001. Ties grew closer following international sanctions against Russia for its 2014 annexation of Crimea, which led Russia to pursue a pivot to China; in that year, China and Russia signed a 30-year gas deal worth $400 billion. In 2019, the two countries defined their relationship as a "comprehensive strategic partnership of coordination for a new era". Ties have continued to deepen since the start of the Russo-Ukrainian war in 2022, with Russia increasingly becoming dependent on China while it is under large-scale international sanctions. China and Russia have significant economic ties, and Russia is an important source of natural energy and oil for China, while China is a critical source of consumer and industrial goods for Russia. China is by far Russia's largest trading partner. The annual trade between China and Russia was US$234 billion as of 2025.

China and Russia have enjoyed close relations militarily, economically, and politically, while supporting each other on various global issues. Commentators have debated whether the bilateral strategic partnership constitutes an alliance. China and Russia officially declared their relations "Not allies, but better than allies". The two countries cooperate through multilateral organizations and project such as the Shanghai Cooperation Organisation, BRICS and the Belt and Road Initiative. Russia recognizes Taiwan as an integral part of China, and supports Chinese unification. Russia also supports China's policies in Hong Kong, Tibet and Xinjiang. In turn, China has called for Russia's security concerns to be accounted for and has opposed the enlargement of NATO and sanctions against Russia.

== History ==
The relations between China and Russia go back to the 16th century, when the Qing dynasty tried to drive Russian settlers out of Manchuria, ended by the signing of the Treaty of Nerchinsk. The Russian Empire consolidated its control over the Russian Far East in the 19th century, after the annexation of part of Chinese Manchuria (1858–1860).

After the establishment of the People's Republic of China in 1949, China and the Soviet Union were initially allies. During the Cold War, the two countries turned into rivals after the Sino-Soviet split in 1961, competing for control of the worldwide Communist movement. There was a serious possibility of a major war between the two nations in the early 1960s; a brief border war took place in 1969. This enmity began to lessen after the death of Chairman of the Chinese Communist Party Mao Zedong in 1976, but relations were poor until the dissolution of the Soviet Union in 1991.

=== 1990s ===
Russia under President Boris Yeltsin initially prioritized relations with the West, paying little attention to relations with China. During a visit to China, Russian Foreign Minister Andrei Kozyrev criticized China's human rights policies. Russia also moved to strengthen unofficial ties with Taiwan. The CCP in turn considered Yeltsin as a traitor and anti-communist, but decided to maintain pragmatic ties; a leaked Politburo meeting in January 1992 said that "Even if Yeltsin is very reactionary we can internally curse him and pray for his downfall, but we shall still have to maintain normal state relations with him".

By summer of 1992, Yeltsin started pursuing a less pro-Western foreign policy. China invited Yeltsin to visit China in March 1992. On 23 December 1992, Yeltsin made his first official visit to China, where he met with CCP general secretary Jiang Zemin and Chinese president Yang Shangkun. Former leader Deng Xiaoping refused to meet with Yeltsin. Yeltsin and Yang announced a joint declaration, which said that China and Russia were "friendly countries" and "good-neighborly and mutually beneficial". Yeltsin also noted that "the ideological barrier" had been removed. The two countries also signed twenty-five memoranda of agreement ranging from cooperation in technology to space exploration.

During the 1990s, cooperation between China and Russia was facilitated by the two countries' mutual desires to counterbalance the influence of the United States and establish a multi-polar international system. Yeltsin moved Russian foreign policy towards one that balanced the East and the West, while Russian foreign policy discussions were divided on liberals that favored more alignment with the West and Eurasianists that sought closer ties with China. Tensions between Russia and NATO also contributed to Yeltsin's shift towards China. The relationship between the two countries was upgraded from "friendly countries" to a "constructive partnership" in September 1994, and was further upgraded to a "strategic partnership of equality and mutual trust for the 21st century" in April 1996.

In December 1996, at the end of Chinese Premier Li Peng's visit to Moscow, Russia and China issued a joint communique pledging to build an "equal and reliable partnership." In April 1997, the countries announced an agreement to cut down their troops along their borders, and published their first foreign policy joint statement titled the Declaration on the Trend to a Multi-polar World and the Establishment of a New International Order. Yeltsin also started to meet regularly with Chinese leader Jiang Zemin. Yeltsin visited Beijing in November 1997, while Jiang visited Moscow in 1998. Relations were further strengthened by the joint opposition to the NATO bombing of Yugoslavia.

=== 2000s ===
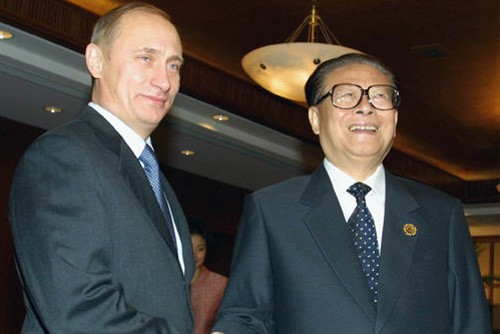
Chinese leader Jiang Zemin with Russian President Vladimir Putin at APEC summit in Shanghai (2001)

In 2000, Vladimir Putin succeeded Yeltsin as the president of Russia. In 2001, the two countries joined with junior partners Kazakhstan, Kyrgyzstan, Tajikistan, and Uzbekistan in the Shanghai Cooperation Organisation (SCO). A month later, the close relations between the two countries were formalized with the Treaty of Good-Neighborliness and Friendly Cooperation, a twenty-year strategic, economic, and security treaty. The treaty was later renewed in June 2021 for five more years.

In November 2002, Hu Jintao succeeded Jiang Zemin as the CCP General Secretary. Putin and Hu held their first meeting in December 2002. The two leaders met regularly, meeting face to face five or six times a year. Chinese Premier Wen Jiabao and his Russian counterparts also met regularly, with Wen quipping in 2007 in a meeting with Prime Minister Viktor Zubkov that "We didn’t even use prepared speeches." China backed Russia in the Second Chechen War and in regards to Russia's concerns of NATO expansion, while Russia backed China regarding the issues of Taiwan, Tibet and Xinjiang. The two countries also increasingly cooperated in the United Nations Security Council. During the 2008 Russo-Georgian war, China opposed Russia's infringement on Georgia's sovereignty. Citing principles of sovereignty, territorial integrity, and global order, China used its influence in the SCO to prevent the organization from supporting Russia. In 2009, the 1st BRIC summit was held in Russia, including China, Brazil and India.

=== 2010s ===
In 2011, during a visit to Russia by Hu Jintao, the two countries agreed to upgrade their relationship to a "comprehensive strategic partnership". In November 2012, Xi Jinping succeeded Hu Jintao as the CCP General Secretary and became the top leader of China. Putin and Xi quickly established a close relationship; the pair met more than 40 times from 2013 to 2025. On the eve of a 2013 state visit to Moscow by Chinese leader Xi Jinping, Russian President Vladimir Putin remarked that the two nations were forging a special relationship. Xi visited the Operational Command Headquarters of the Russian Armed Forces, the first time a foreign leader visited the building.

When China attempted to build closer relations with Russia in 2013, the Russian government initially had reservations. However, the United States sanctions against Russia for its 2014 annexation of Crimea helped push Russia to a warmer relationship with China. Although some Chinese banks and companies refused to fully cooperate with Russia because of the concern that secondary sanctions might be applied to them, Russian-Chinese economic ties grew once China itself faced sanctions concerns. China neither denounced nor recognized the Russian annexation of Crimea. In May 2015, Xi Jinping visited Russia to attend the Moscow Victory Day Parade; the two countries signed agreements on joint assembly of a long-range passenger aircraft and the construction of a high-speed railway line from Moscow to Kazan. In 2019, during a visit to Russia by Xi, the two countries upgraded their relationship to a "comprehensive strategic partnership of coordination for a new era".

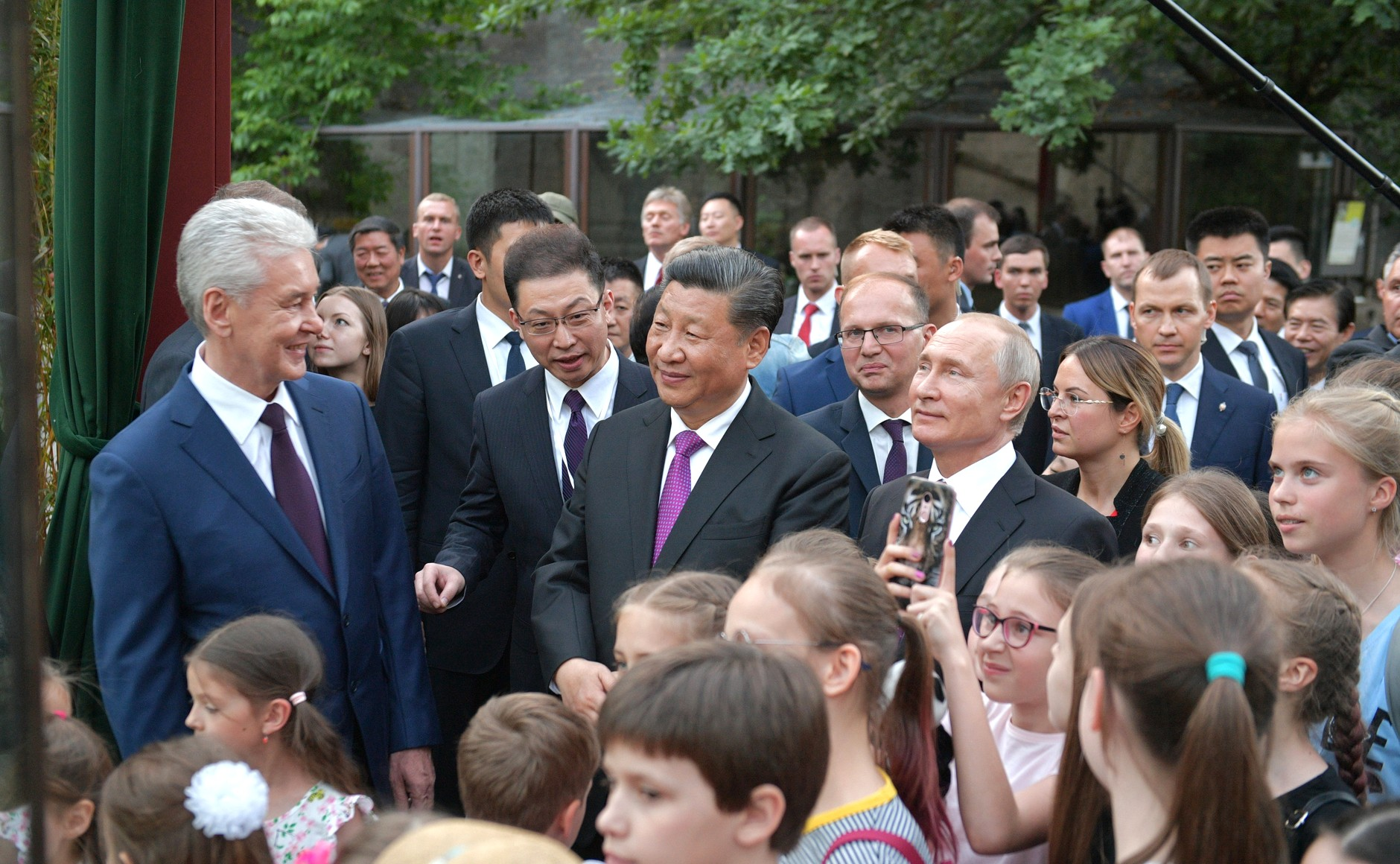
Chinese leader Xi Jinping presented two pandas to Moscow Zoo at a ceremony with Vladimir Putin on 5 June 2019

By 2019, both nations had serious grievances with the United States. For China, the issues were control of the South China Sea, trade policies, and technology policy. For Russia, the main issue was severe economic penalties imposed by the U.S. and Europe to punish its seizure of Crimea from Ukraine. China and Russia do, however, differ on some policies. China does not recognize Russia's annexation of Crimea. Russia has officially kept neutral regarding China's claims in the South China Sea, but has criticized the involvement of "non-regional powers", indirectly referencing the United States. Nevertheless, China and Russia currently enjoy the best relations they have had since the late 1950s. Although they have no formal alliance, the two countries do have an informal agreement to coordinate diplomatic and economic moves, and build up an alliance against the United States.

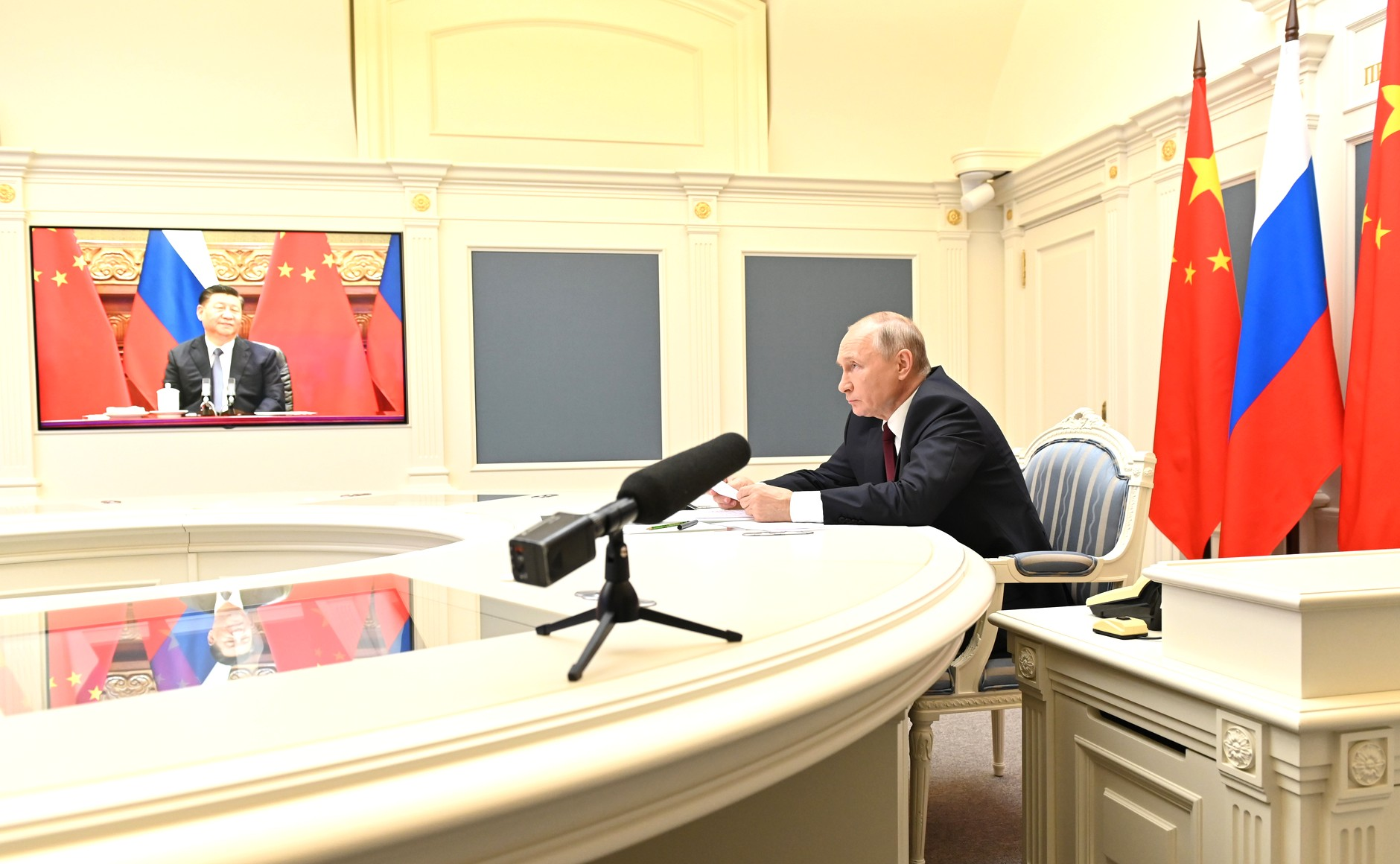
Xi continued to meet Putin via videoconference during the COVID-19 crisis

=== 2020s ===
During the COVID-19 pandemic, some tensions arose within the Chinese-Russian relationship. For example, in October 2020, relying on the pretext of coronavirus allegedly found on the exterior of fish packaging, China greatly reduced the import of Russian seafood, causing a substantial price decrease in Russian seafood. Chinese restrictions on Russian cargo traffic at border crossings also led to tensions, including a drivers' strike.

==== Russo-Ukrainian war ====
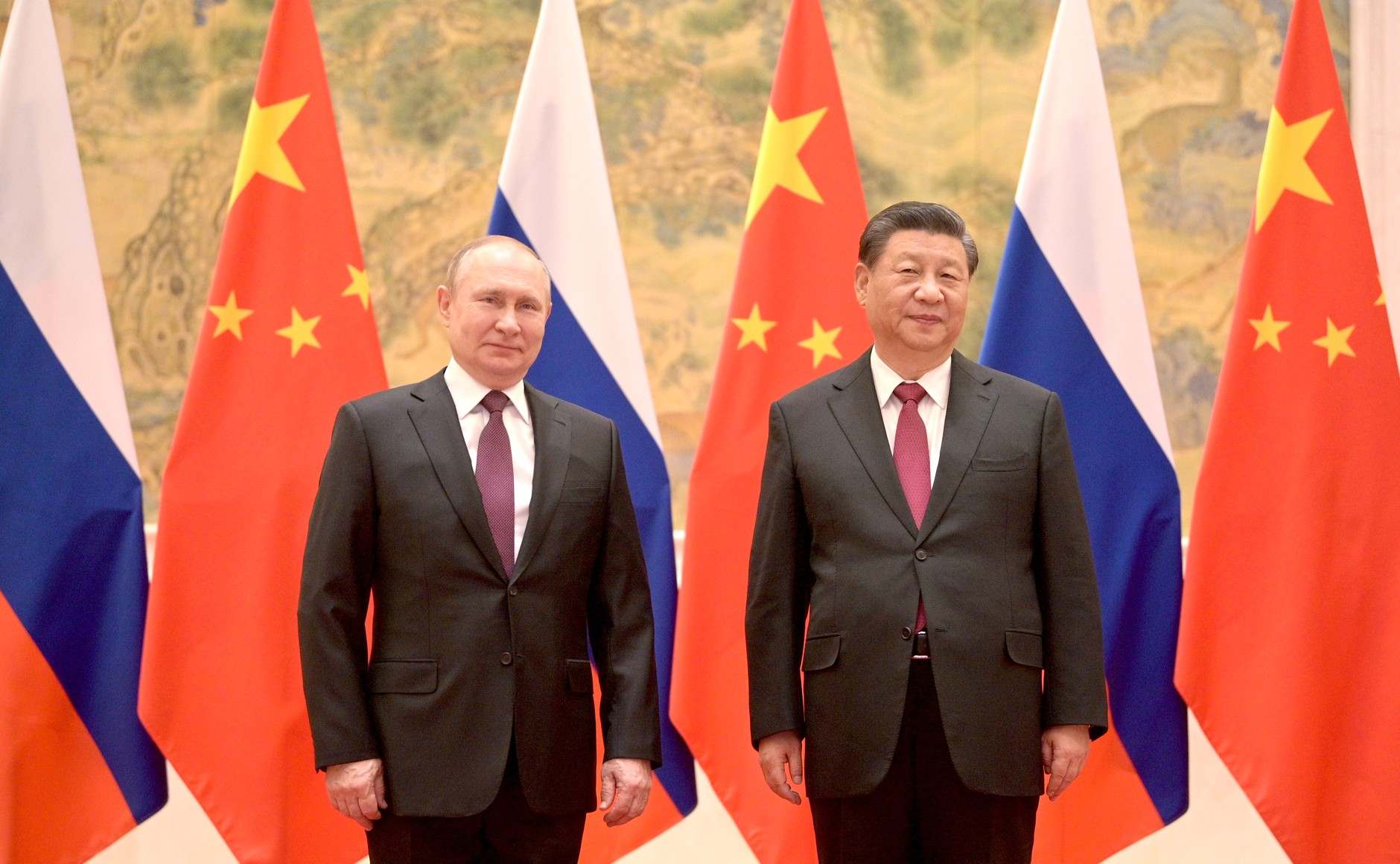
Putin visited China and met with Xi Jinping on 4 February 2022

Xi and Putin met on 4 February 2022, during a massive Russian build-up of force on the Ukrainian border, with the two releasing a joint statement which said the relationship between the two countries was "superior to the political and military alliances of the Cold War era" and that both nations shared "no limits" to their commitments. Russia stated that Taiwan is an inalienable part of China and expressed opposition to Taiwan independence, while the two countries called for an end to NATO enlargement and supported Russia's demand for security guarantees from the West. The two countries also voiced opposition to AUKUS, expressed concern about U.S. plans to develop missile defense and criticized attempts by "certain states" to "establish global hegemony".

Following the Russian invasion of Ukraine, China stated that it respects Ukraine's sovereignty but Russia's security concerns about enlargement of NATO should also be addressed. It abstained from United Nations votes that condemned the invasion. China has also objected to international sanctions against Russia. On 25 February 2022, one day following the Russian invasion of Ukraine, Putin told Xi during a phone call that Russia is eager to engage in high-level negotiations with Ukraine, according to China's foreign ministry. In March 2022, Russia added Taiwan to the unfriendly countries and territories list that commit "unfriendly actions" against Russia. Xi Jinping assured Vladimir Putin of China's support on Russian "sovereignty and security" in June 2022. China did not recognize the Russian annexation of Donetsk, Kherson, Luhansk and Zaporizhzhia oblasts in September 2022.

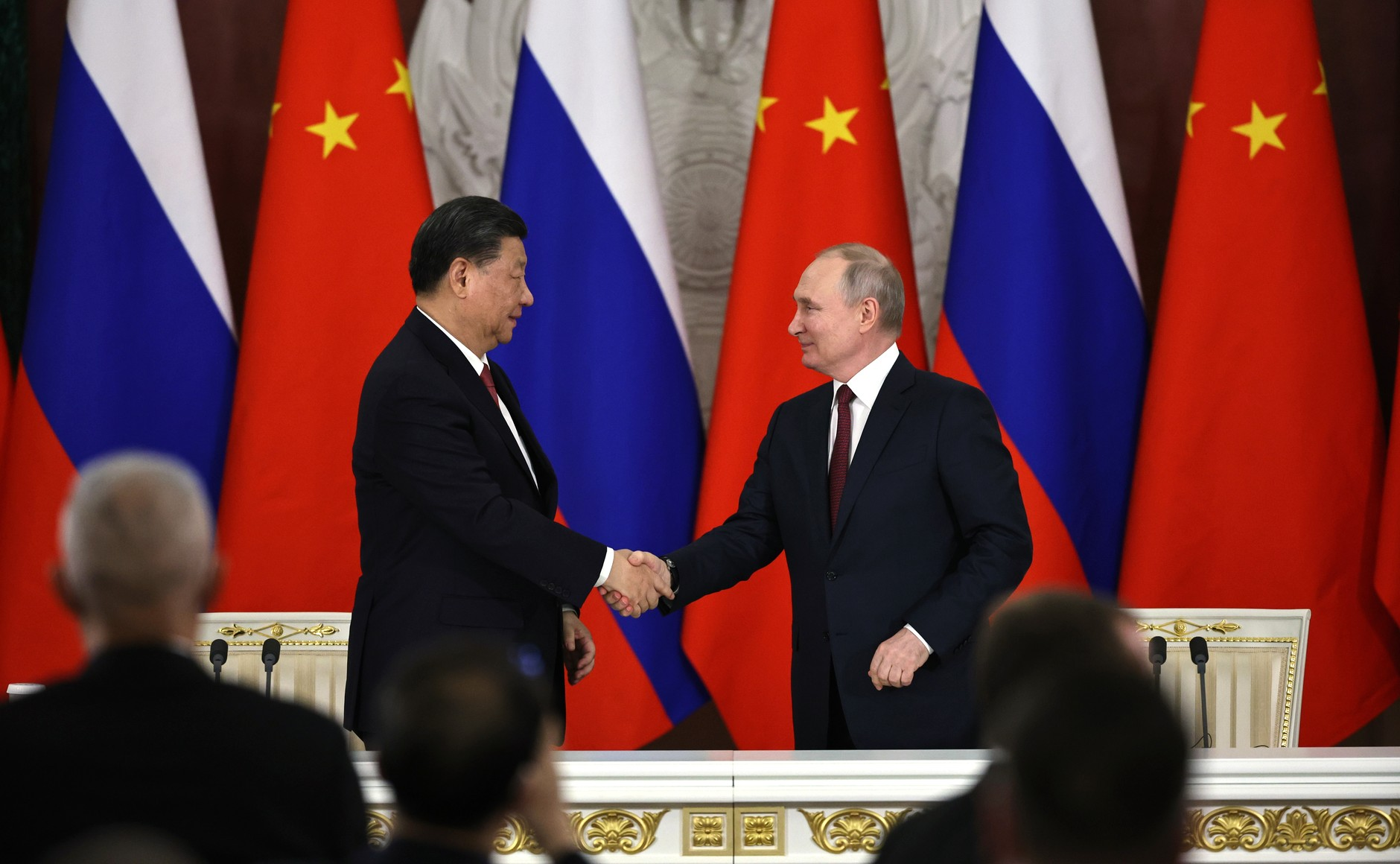
Putin welcomes Xi in Moscow during Xi's visit to Russia in March 2023

In February 2023, Kremlin spokesperson Dmitry Peskov rejected the Chinese peace proposal, saying that "for now, we don't see any of the conditions that are needed to bring this whole story towards peace." On 20–22 March 2023, Xi Jinping visited Russia and met with Vladimir Putin both in official and unofficial capacity, where both leaders signed the "Joint Statement on Deepening the Comprehensive Strategic Partnership of Coordination for the New Era". It was the first international meeting of Vladimir Putin since the International Criminal Court issued a warrant for his arrest, as well as Xi's first trip abroad after being re-elected for a third term as president. In May 2023, Russian Prime Minister Mikhail Mishustin and Deputy Prime Minister Alexander Novak visited Beijing and met Xi Jinping. On 20 July 2023, the Chinese general-consulate in Odesa, Ukraine, was damaged in a Russian attack on a grain terminal in a nearby port, plus other parts of the city. China has been the largest importer of grains from Ukraine.

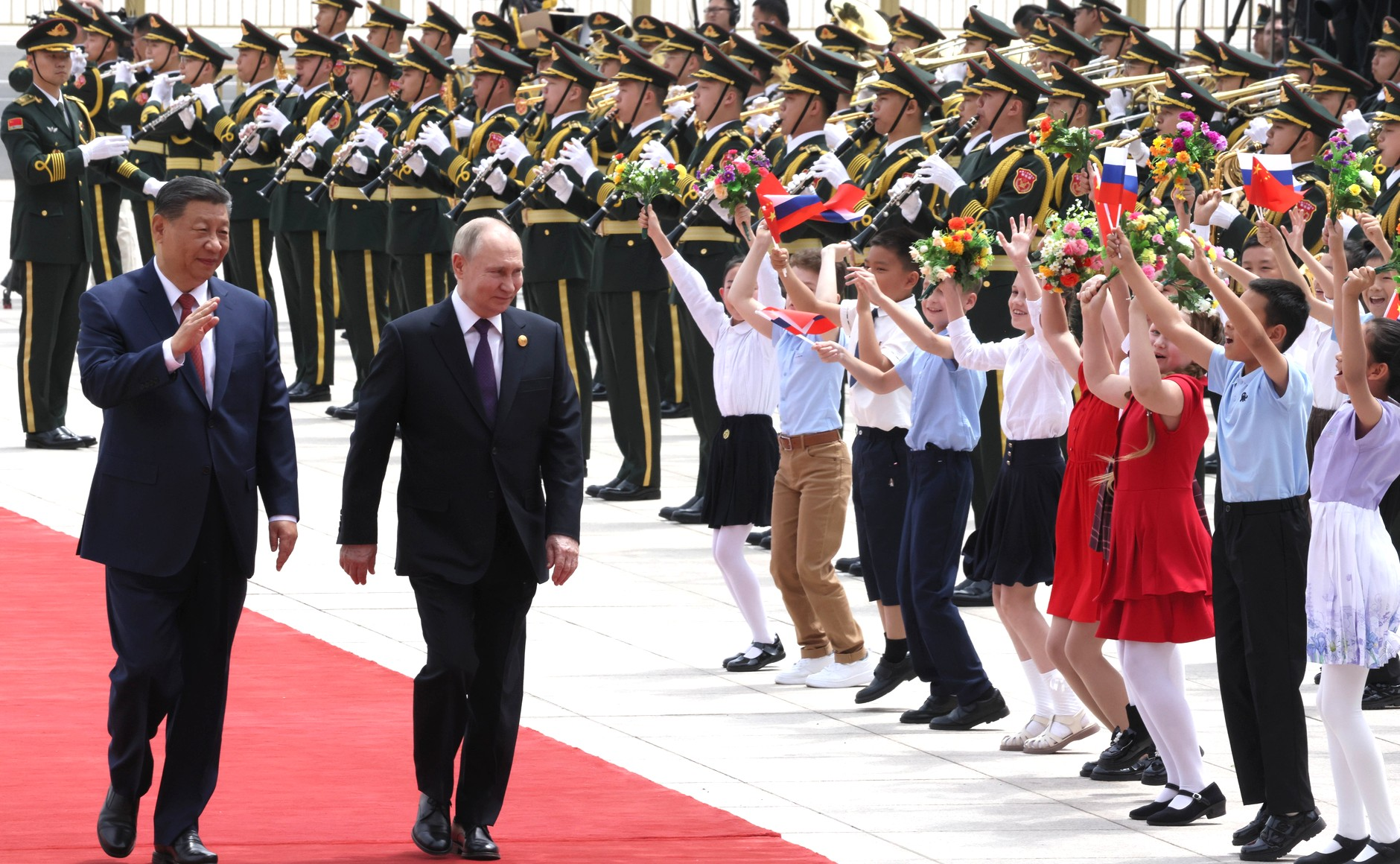
Xi welcomes Putin in Beijing during Putin's visit to China in May 2024

In May 2026, Vladimir Putin made a state visit to China, his first foreign visit after assuming office for the fifth term following the 2024 presidential election. In May 2025, Xi Jinping visited Russia to attend the Moscow Victory Day Parade. According to the South China Morning Post, a July 2025 meeting with European Union's High Representative for Foreign Affairs Kaja Kallas, Director of the Central Foreign Affairs Commission Office Wang Yi stated that China did not want to see Russia's loss in Ukraine, fearing the United States could focus more on Asia once the conflict in Europe is over. In September 2025, Chinese leader Xi Jinping and Russian President Vladimir Putin attended the China Victory Day Parade in Beijing. On 16 May 2026, Vladimir Putin visited China to meet with Xi. The two leaders met again on the sidelines of August 2026 Bishkek SCO summit. In November 2026, Putin visited Shenzhen to attend APEC China 2026, where he held a bilateral meeting with Xi and a trilateral meeting with the two leaders and U.S. President Donald Trump.

== Border ==
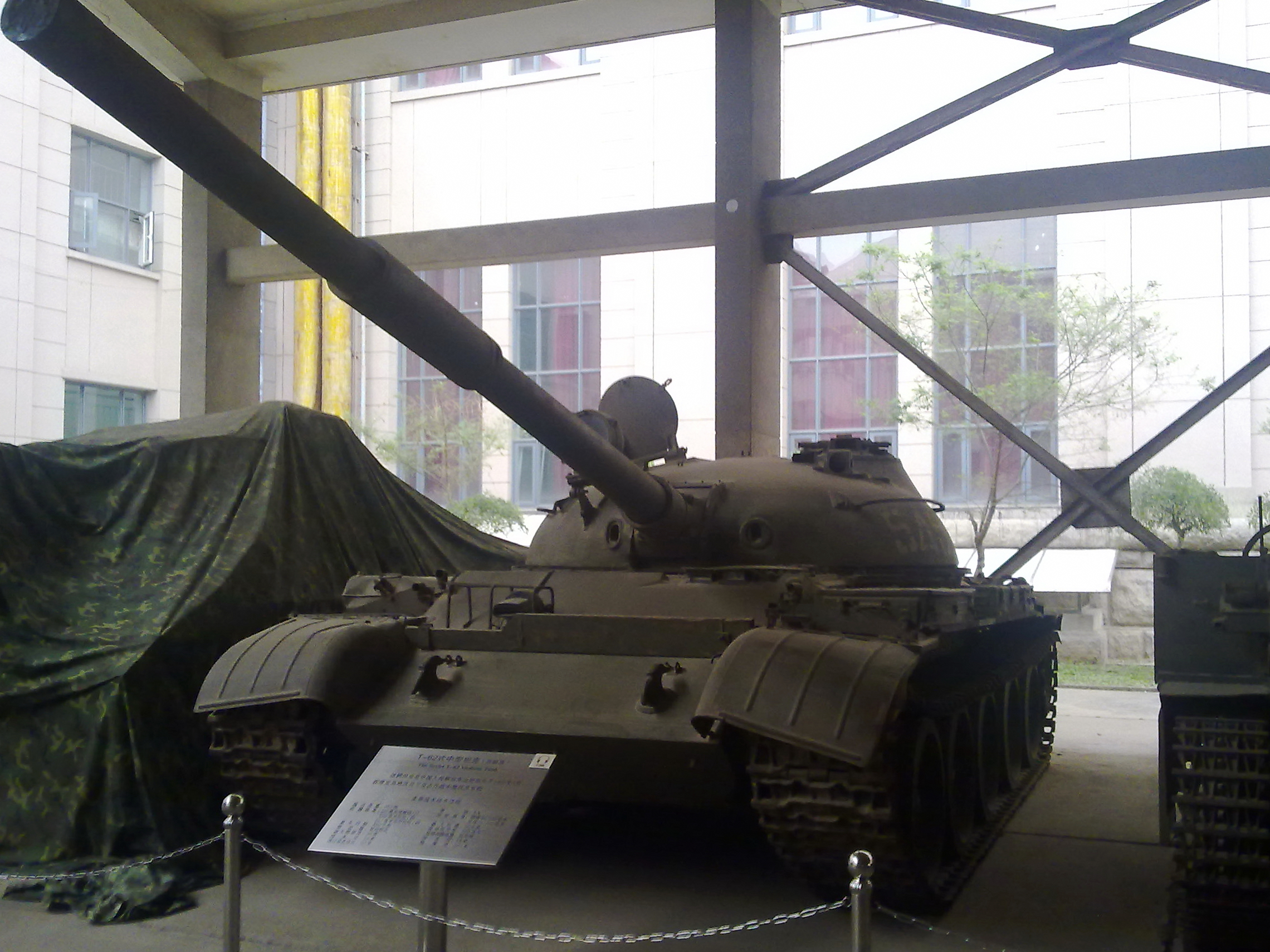
Soviet T-62 tank captured during the Sino-Soviet border conflict on display at the Military Museum in Beijing

On 29 May 1994, during the visit of Russian Prime Minister Viktor Chernomyrdin to Beijing, Russian and Chinese officials signed an agreement on the Sino-Russian Border Management System intended to facilitate border trade and hinder criminal activity. On 3 September of that year, a demarcation agreement was signed, fixing the boundary along a previously–disputed 55-km stretch of the western Sino-Russian border. A further agreement was signed in November 1997, leaving only areas still in dispute the Abagaitu Islet, Yinlong (Tarabarov) Island, and Bolshoy Ussuriysky Island. After the final demarcation carried out in the early 2000s, it measures 4,209.3 kilometres (2,615.5 mi), and is the world's sixth-longest international border.

The 2004 Complementary Agreement between the People's Republic of China and the Russian Federation on the Eastern Section of the China–Russia Boundary stated that Russia agrees to transfer a part of Abagaitu Islet, all of Yinlong (Tarabarov) Island, about a half of Bolshoy Ussuriysky Island, along with some adjacent islets, to China. A border dispute between Russia and China, standing since Japanese invasion of Manchuria of 1931, was thus resolved. These Amur River islands were, until then, administered by Russia and claimed by China. The event was meant to foster feelings of reconciliation and cooperation between the two countries by their leaders. The transfer has been ratified by both the China's National People's Congress and the Russia's State Duma. The official transfer ceremony occurred on-site on 14 October 2008, concluding the border dispute between the two nations.

In the 21st century, the Chinese Communist Party's version of the Sino-Soviet border conflict, which is present on many official CCP websites, describes the 1969 Sino-Soviet border conflict as a Soviet aggression against China. Russia is the only country that still controls the territory it acquired from the Qing dynasty via the unequal treaties, and teachers in China continued to teach students about the annexation.

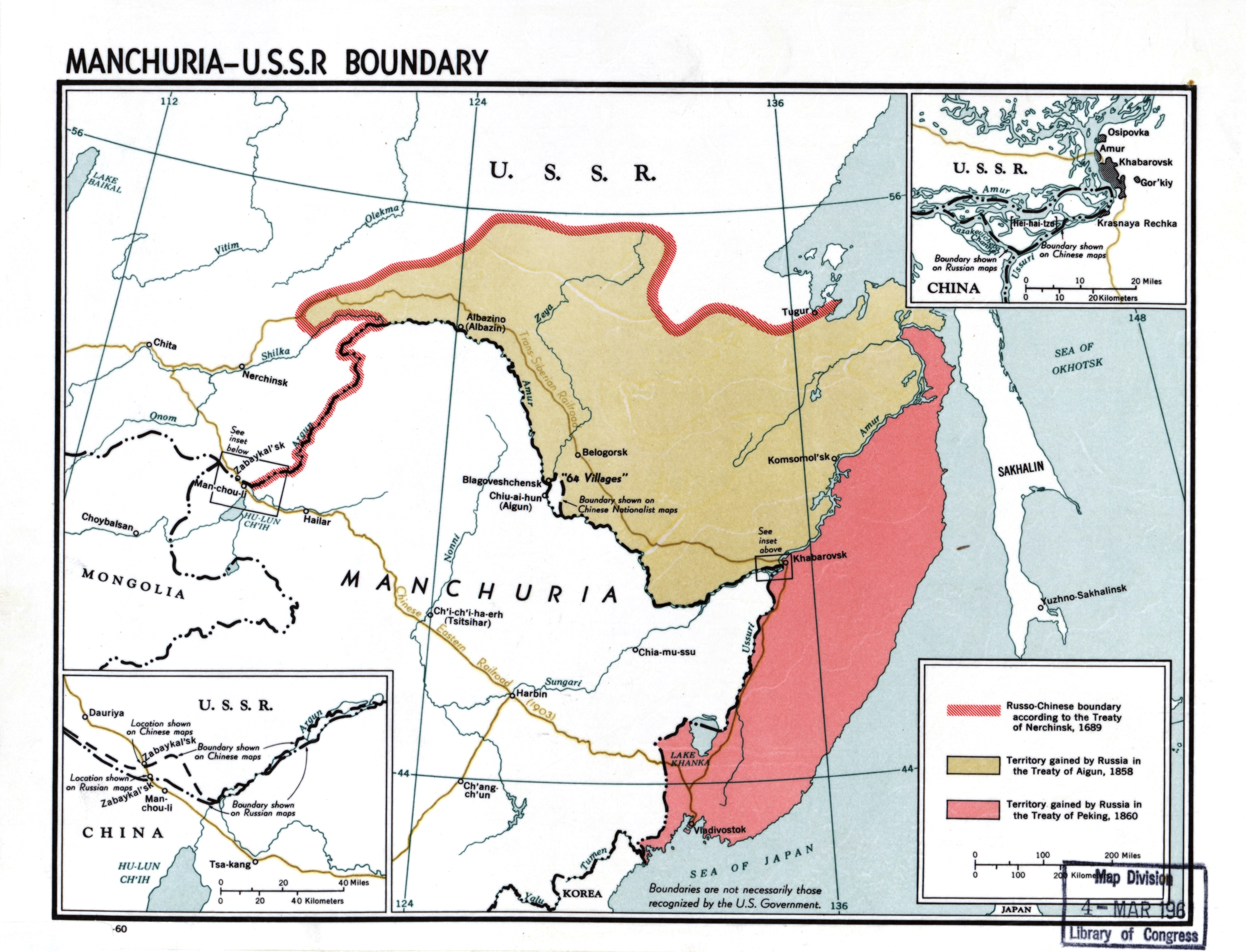
Territories that have become part of Russia under the Aigun Treaty and the Beijing Treaty of 1860

== Economic relations ==
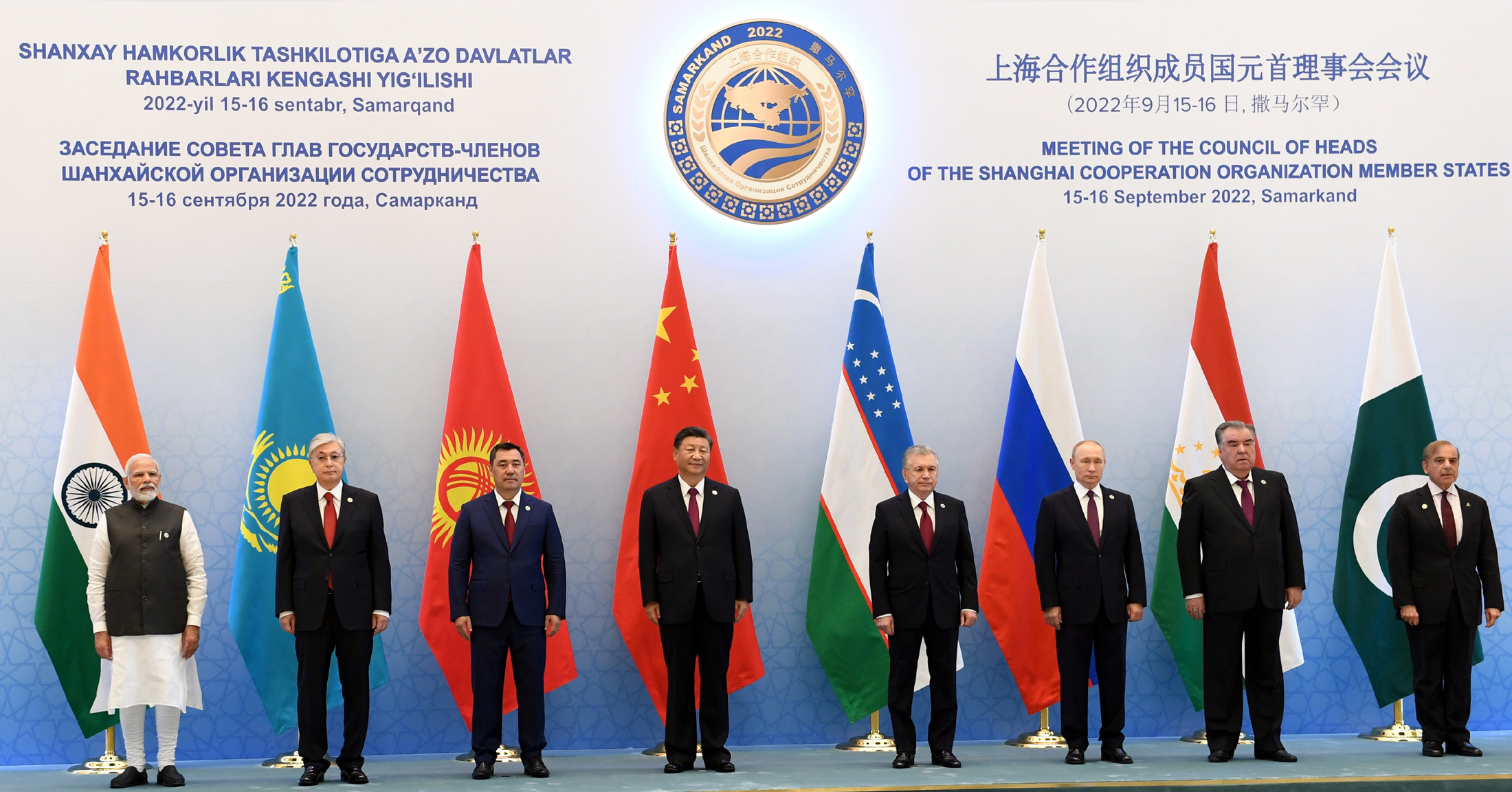
Putin and Xi Jinping at the 2022 Shanghai Cooperation Organisation summit

China and Russia have complementary economies; China is a significant manufacturing economy while Russia's economy heavily relies on natural resources needed by China. From 2001 to 2010, trade between the two countries increased from $10 billion to $59.3 billion, further jumping to $80 billion in 2011. In 2010, China became Russia's largest trading partner. By 2018 two-way trade had climbed to a total of $100 billion.In 2024, total trade increased to a record $245 billion. In 2025, it decreased to $234 billion. China is by far Russia's largest trading partner leading to a heavy over dependence in the relationship; as of 2024, China accounts for 57% of Russia's imports and 31% of its exports. Most of Russia's exports to China originate from the mining and petrochemicals sectors. More than half of Russia's exports to China come from mineral fuels, oil, and petroleum products (60.7%), followed by wood and wood products (9.4%), non-ferrous metals (9%), fish and seafood (3.5%), and chemical products (3.3%). China is also gradually becoming a major consumer of Russian agricultural products. The main categories of imports to Russia from China are machinery and equipment (35.9%), clothing (13.7%), chemical products (9.1%), fur and fur products (5.6%), footwear (5.3%), and furniture (3%). Chinese electronics are steadily expanding their presence in Russia.

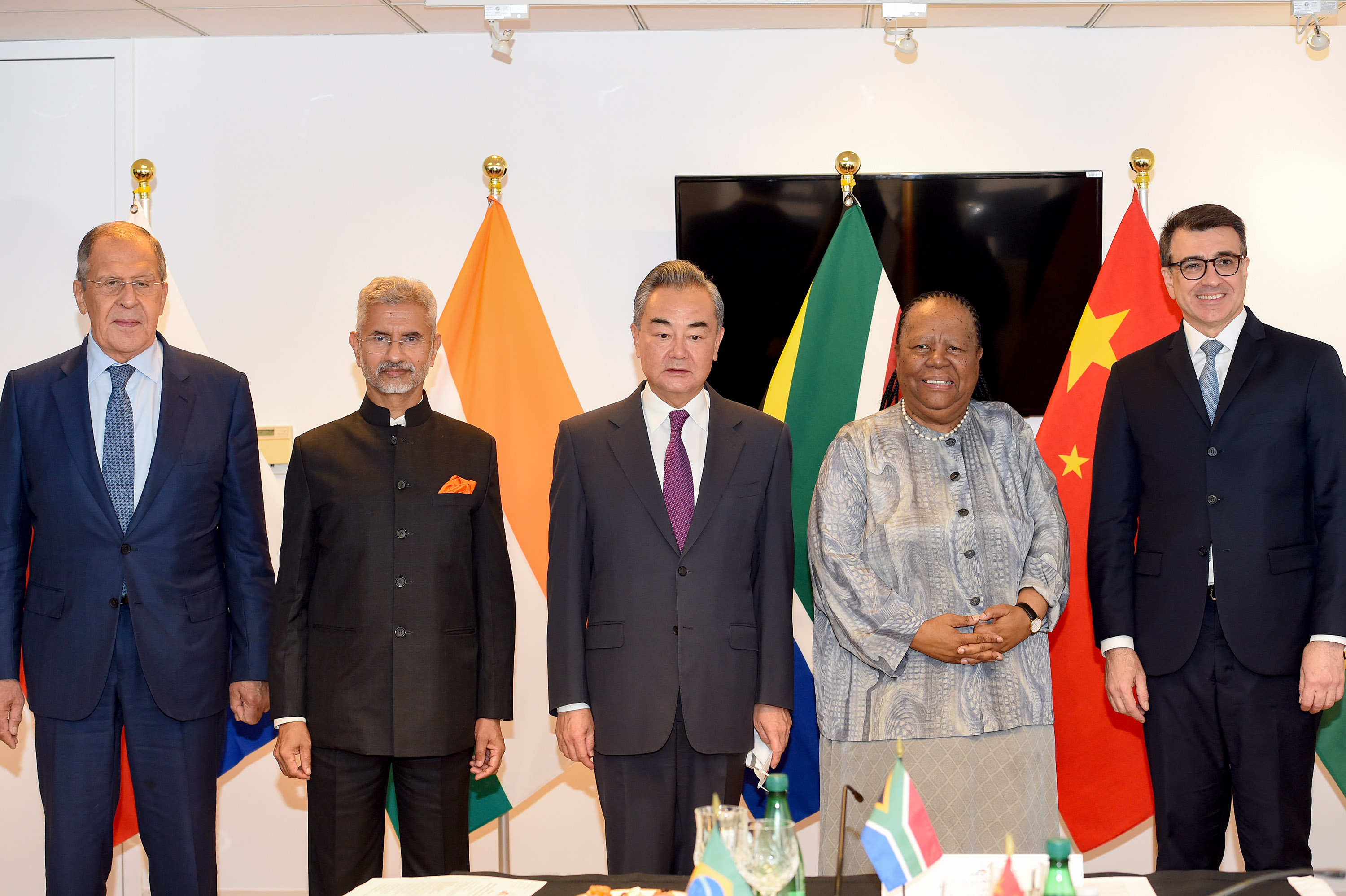
Meeting of BRICS (Brazil, Russia, India, China, South Africa) foreign ministers in New York City on 22 September 2022

Between 2008 and 2009, when Russia experienced the Great Recession, there was a sharp increase in borrowing from China. This trend, however, did not last. Starting in 2013, borrowing started to grow steadily. In 2013, China initiated the creation the Belt and Road Initiative to strengthen economic ties and cooperation and to attract investors from Asia and other parts of the world. The initiative extends from China to Europe through Central Asia and Russia, as it is an important transit logistical link between China and Europe, in which the Asian Infrastructure Investment Bank may play a significant role. China has also shown interest in cooperating with the countries of the Eurasian Economic Union (EAEU). The creation of the EAEU is posed to serve as an important platform for multilateral cooperation in the region, as all participants are friendly neighbors and partners with Russia, as well as traditional partners with China. Russia is interested in creating a free trade zone of the EAEU and China, as well as the use of the national currency in this region.

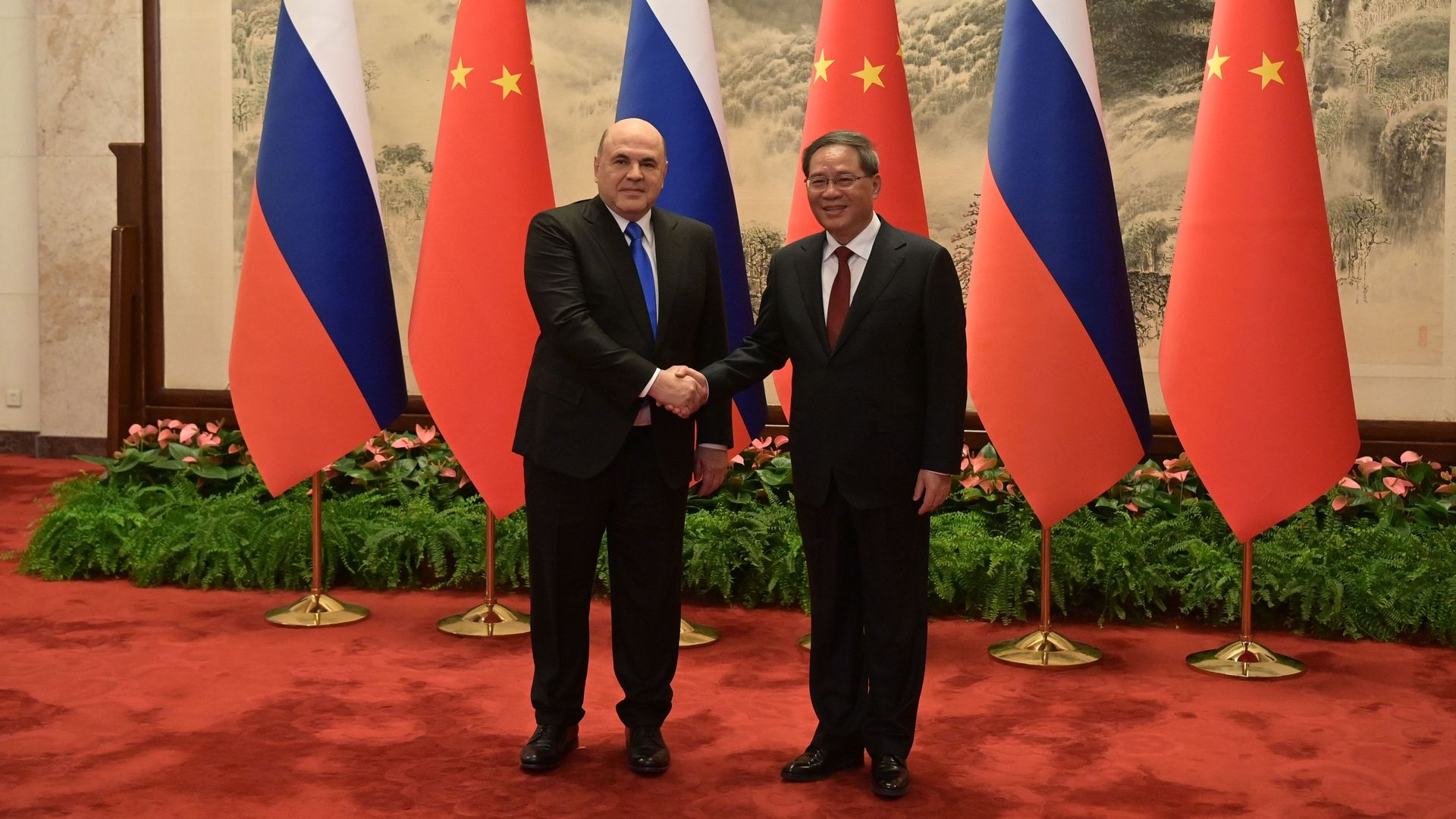
Chinese Premier Li Qiang and Russian Prime Minister Mikhail Mishustin in Beijing, China on 24 May 2023

Following the implementation of international sanctions during the Russo-Ukrainian War, Russia increasingly became dependent on China. China's total trade with Russia was a record $190 billion in 2022. In the same year, China accounted for 40% of Russia's imports. In the first half of 2023, models from Chinese car companies accounted for more than a third of all sales in Russia. China also stood as Russia's leading supplier of high-tech and digital products. As Western high-tech companies have to withdraw from the Russian market, Chinese companies dominated the Russian market. The Jamestown Foundation estimated in 2026 that around 90% of Russian machine-tool imports came from China. The largest trade increases are seen in Chinese made cars and trucks. Increasing trade volume between the two countries is particularly visible in Heihe. Chinese vehicle exports to Russia have increased significantly since 2022; in 2025, Chinese brands held a 57.2% market share in the Russian car market, up from 18% in 2021.

=== Currency ===
On 23 November 2010, at a meeting between Russian Prime Minister Vladimir Putin and the Chinese Premier Wen Jiabao, it was announced that Russia and China have decided to use their own national currencies for bilateral trade, instead of the U.S. dollar. The trading of the Chinese yuan against the Russian ruble started in the Chinese interbank market, while the yuan's trading against the ruble started on the Russian foreign exchange market in December 2010. In 2014, Beijing and Moscow signed a 150 billion yuan central bank liquidity swap line agreement to avoid and counter American sanctions.

Russia's dependence on the Chinese yuan increased heavily after its invasion of Ukraine in 2022. The share of Russian exports paid in yuan rose to 16% by December 2022, compared to 0.4% before the invasion, while share of imports paid in yuan increased to 23%, up from 4% before. Yuan's share of stock market trading in Russia increased from 3% to 33% Nearly 50 financial institutions were offering yuan saving accounts by 2023, and households were holding around $6 billion worth of yuan in Russian banks by the end of 2022. By the end of 2023, more than 90% of the trade between China and Russia was done with either the yuan or the ruble. Furthermore, Russia has been using Chinese yuan for more than 25% of its international trade with countries other than China. According to the Russian Central Bank, the Chinese yuan was in June 2024 used to settle more than a third of all Russian exports, up from 0.4% before the full-scale invasion.

In June 2024 the Bank of China had halted payments to sanctioned Russian banks because it felt compelled by current events and did not want to risk secondary sanctions. By August 2024, Russian transactions with Chinese banks (especially smaller ones) were largely closed. Due to strict secondary sanctions, Russia could not exchange money with China. As many as 98% of Chinese banks rejected direct yuan payments from Russia.

=== Natural resources ===
Russian officials have repeatedly reiterated their opposition to being merely China's natural resources storehouse. As early as 2001, Deputy Prime Minister and Finance Minister Alexei Kudrin warned that if Russia failed to become "a worthy economic partner" for Asia and the Pacific Rim, "China and the Southeast Asian countries will steamroll Siberia and the Far East." At the start of his presidency in September 2008, Dmitry Medvedev echoed similar concerns, warning a Kamchatka audience that if Russia fails to develop the Russian Far East, it could turn into a raw material base for more developed Asian countries and "unless we speed up our efforts, we can lose everything." Regional experts have pointed out that despite these increasingly vocal concerns, the local economy of the Russian Far East has become increasingly reliant on Chinese goods, services, and labor over the past decade; furthermore, local out-migration shows little sign of reversing. For all the early promises under Putin, Moscow's policy towards the Russian Far East has not seemed effective as of 2008.

In 2008, a consortium of Chinese engineering firms led by Harbin Turbine signed an agreement with Russian power producer OGK to produce coal-fired turbines in the Russian Far East, adding 41,000 megawatts of new generating capacity by 2011. Stanislav Nevynitsyn, executive director of OGK, admitted, "It is simply a necessity for us to work with the Chinese – we will not get the capacity built otherwise." Through loans to Russia's Bank for Development and Foreign Economic Affairs, Vnesheconombank (VEB), China became a major stockholder in Lukoil in 2009. In the same year, after having excluded foreign firms from bidding on the huge Udokan copper mine in Southeast Siberia, Moscow welcomed Chinese, South Korean, and Kazakh miners and refiners back into the bidding process.

After the Russian invasion of Ukraine, Russian coal exports came under particular pressure in Europe due to the combination of energy transition and sanctions over Ukraine, causing Russia to heavily increase trade on coal exports to China and other Asian countries. In April 2024, after the United States and the United Kingdom announced a ban on imports of Russian aluminum, copper, and nickel. the Russian nickel, copper and palladium mining and smelting company Norilsk Nickel planned to move some of its copper smelting to China and establish a joint venture with a Chinese company. Finished copper products would be sold as Chinese products to avoid Western sanctions. China is Norilsk Nickel's largest export market since 2023.

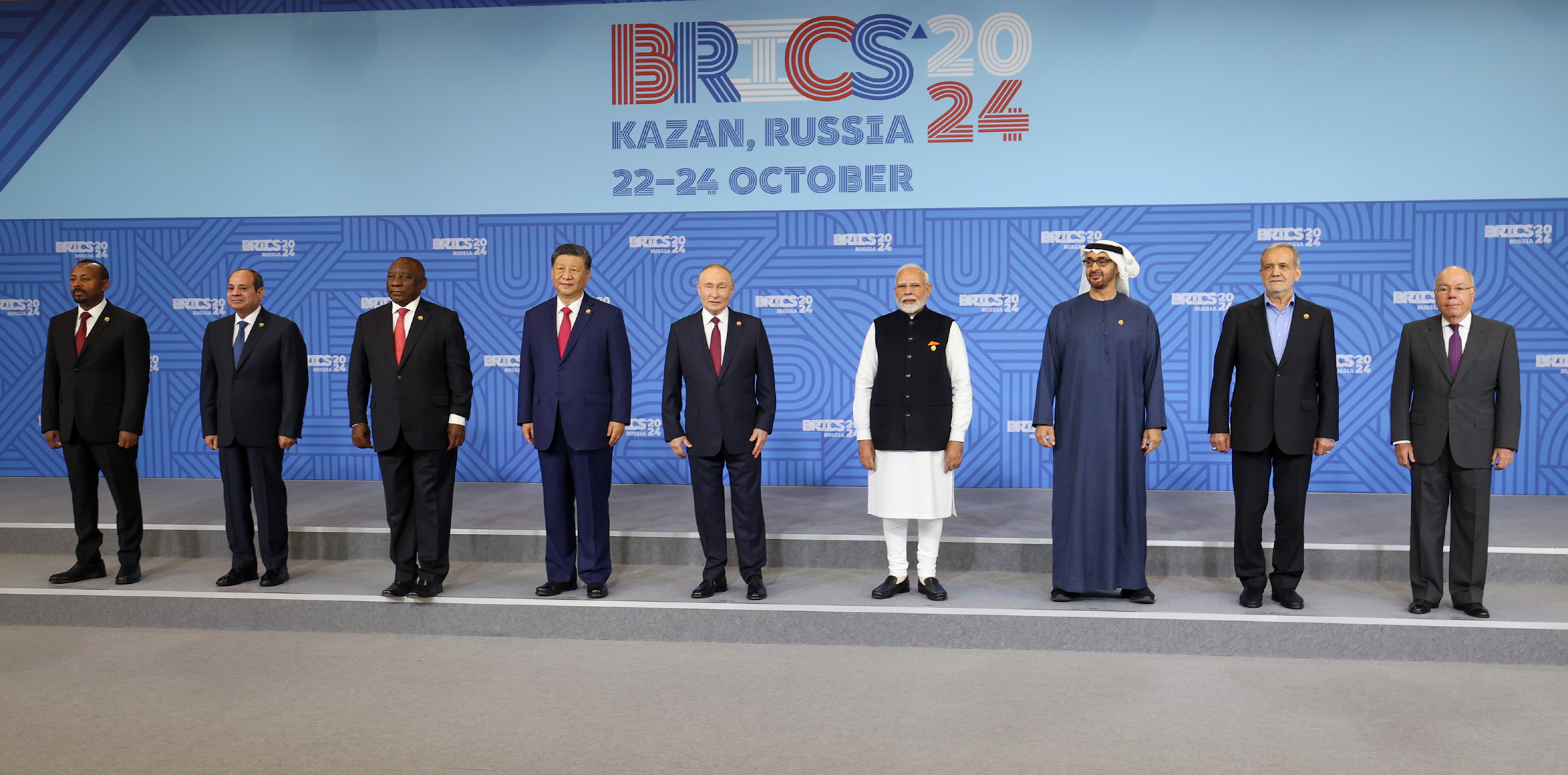
Vladimir Putin and Xi Jinping at the 16th BRICS summit in Kazan, Russia, 23 October 2024

== Energy relations ==
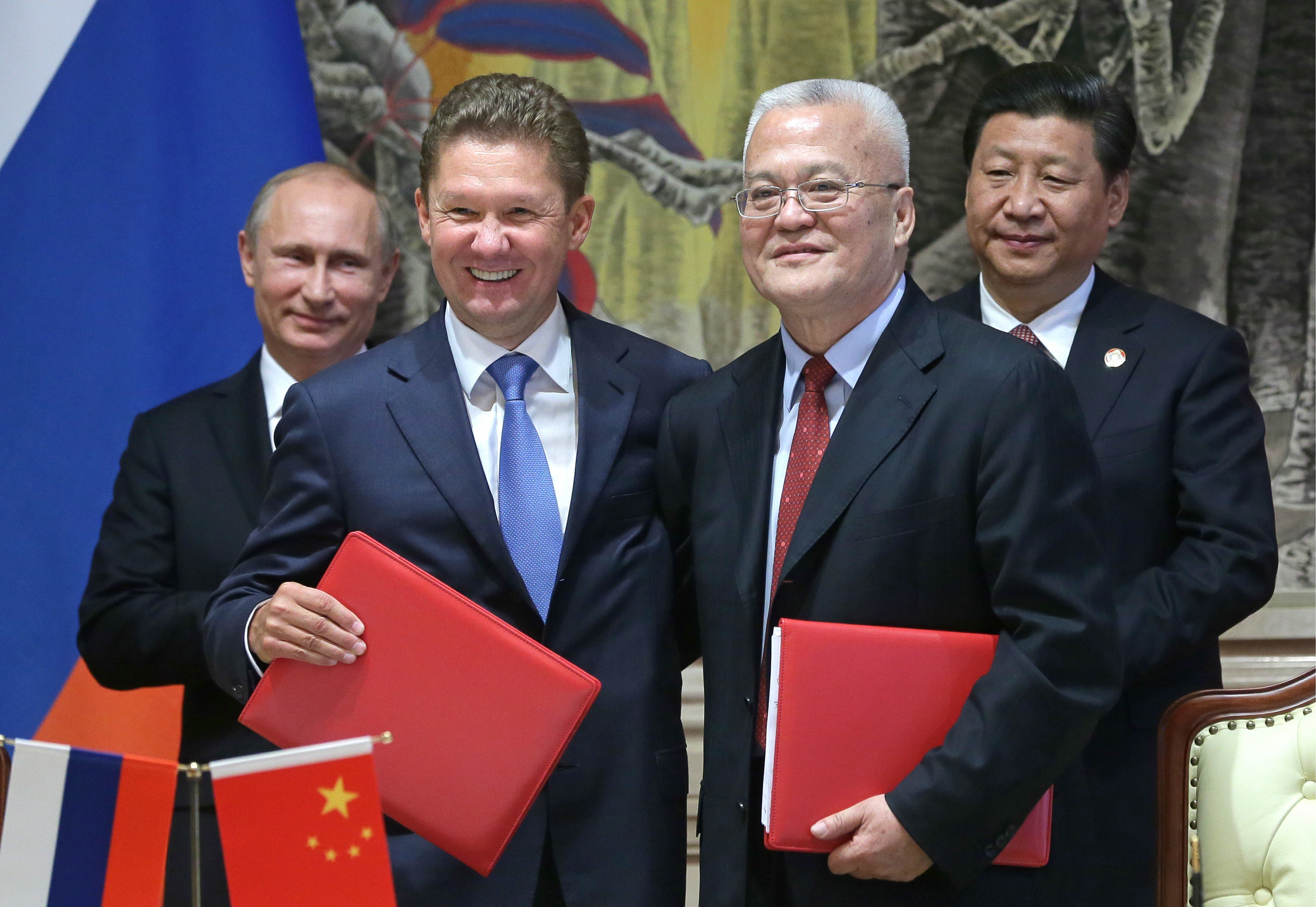
On 21 May 2014, China and Russia signed a $400 billion gas deal. Starting 2019, Russia plans to provide natural gas to China for the next 30 years.

Since the dissolution of the Soviet Union in 1991, energy relations between China and Russia have been generally marked by cooperation and regard for mutual geopolitical and strategic interests. China's fast-growing economy required increasing energy imports while Russia's economy has been largely driven by the demand for the export of natural resources. China turned from a net exporter of petroleum to a net importer for the first time in 1993. China had become the world's second-largest oil-consuming country as of 2011, and the world's largest overall energy consumer as of 2010. Given its geographical proximity to China and position as one of the world's largest oil producers and natural gas exporters, Russia has been an obvious candidate for meeting this increased demand. While energy relations have primarily related to oil, gas, and coal, there have also been partnerships with regard to nuclear and renewable (wind and water) energy technology.

The influence of Russia's regional energy trade has led to a sense of local uneasiness about foreign countries' influence in the sector. In 2000, President Putin warned a Siberian audience that unless Russia intensified the region's development, the Russian Far East would end up speaking Chinese, Japanese and Korean. Scholars and regional experts have suggested that China's rapid economic growth (especially relative to Russia's GDP growth rate) lies at the root of anxieties concerning the Russian Far East. While the Russian and Chinese economies were roughly the same size in 1993, China's grew to over 3.5 times larger than Russia's by 2008. Even since 1998, when Russia began a rapid economic recovery, China has grown at a faster rate; the gap has only widened since the 2008 financial crisis and falling energy prices of the late 2000s. China's growth has led to the creation of new productive capacity, whereas Russia's recovery has been based largely on reutilizing Soviet-era capacity that had idled in the early 1990s.

=== Oil and natural gas ===
In 1997 the China National Petroleum Corporation (CNPC) signed three contracts with the Russian oil firm Yukos where Yukos would sell 1.5 million tons of oil to China in 1999 along the existing railway routes. Additionally, discussions were launched regarding the possibility of building a pipeline from the Yukos oilfield to Northeast China. In June 1997, CNPC reached an agreement with Sidanko, where Sidanko would export 3 to 3.5 billion cubic meters of natural gas from the Kovykta field over the next 36 years, with an eventual 20 billion cubic meters going to China and other Asian countries once the proposed pipeline was completed. Sidanko went bankrupt by 2000, however, and the Russian State Duma closed the Kovykta field to foreign investors as a "strategic asset".

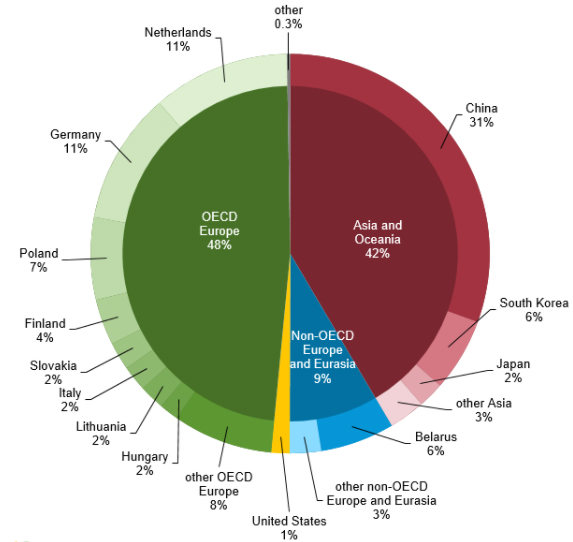
Russian oil exports by destination in 2020.

In 2001, Yukos proposed the Eastern Siberia–Pacific Ocean oil pipeline, which would link its oil refinery in Angarsk to Daqing, in northern China. At the time, rail routes were the only means of transporting oil into the growing Chinese market. In January 2003, however Japan became willing to finance a pipeline ranging the whole Russian Far East to Nakhodka. Putin expressed greater interest in the Japanese project, and the Chinese project stalled in October 2003 when Yukos chief executive Mikhail Khodorkovsky was arrested, and the Russian government launched an immediate investigation into the company. A week after Khodorkovsky's arrest, China Foreign Ministry spokeswoman Zhang Qiyue publicly announced that the Kremlin investigation would not impact the proposed China-Russia oil pipeline project. in 2003, China and Russia agreed that the new Daqing pipeline would include a spur in Skovorodino. In September 2004, Chinese premier Wen Jiabao met with Russian Prime Minister Mikhail Fradkov in Moscow, where the two heads of government signed agreements affirming Russia's promise to set the route of the pipeline from Eastern Siberia to the Pacific, with priority given to laying a pipeline spur to China, as well as increasing rail oil exports to China to 10 million tons (200,000 b/d) in 2005 and 15 million tons (300,000 b/d) in 2006.

Four days before Wen's visit, Yukos publicly announced that rail shipments of crude oil to the CNPC would end beginning on 28 September 2004. The Kremlin had begun auctioning off the troubled company's operating assets a month prior in August. In September 2005 Putin announced that the pipeline to Daqing would be built before the main pipeline was extended to the Pacific coast. Negotiations with Japan were also hindered by their insistence on regaining the Kuril Islands. In February 2009 China signed a "loans for oil" agreement under which China would pay the Russian side $25 million for the construction of the pipeline in return for Russia delivering 300 million tons of oil over the next 20 years. 10 September 2010 marked the completion of the 1,000-kilometre (620 mi) Russia-China Crude Pipeline, the first pipeline ever built between China and Russia, which started pumping to China in 2011. Upon the pipeline's completion in 2010, CNPC also signed a general agreement with Transneft over the operation of the pipeline, a framework agreement with Gazprom to import natural gas to China from 2015 onwards, an agreement with Rosneft on extending oil supply to the Russia-China Crude Pipeline, and an agreement with Lukoil on expanding strategic cooperation.

In December 2003, CNPC and Sakhalin Energy signed a frame agreement on exploration and development in Russia's Sakhalin oilfield. The plan met strong opposition from Gazprom, which has a rival pipeline project and controls all Russian gas exports apart from sales through PSAs such as Sakhalin-1. In August 2006, Sakhalin-I's De-Kastri oil terminal began exporting processed petroleum to markets including China, Japan, and South Korea.

Gazprom, Soyuzneftegaz and the Chinese Embassy in Moscow all expressed interest in Yuganskneftegaz, a main arm of Yukos. The subsidiary was ultimately acquired by Russia's state-owned oil company Rosneft for roughly $9.3 billion. In February 2005, Russian Finance Minister Alexei Kudrin revealed that Chinese banks provided $6 billion in financing the Rosneft acquisition. This financing was reportedly secured by long-term oil delivery contracts between Rosneft and the CNPC. In the same month, the Chinese Foreign Ministry denied that China provided "funds" for the deal. State-owned Lukoil became China's largest Russian oil supplier when CNPC reached a strategic cooperation agreement with the company in September 2006. Construction on a direct pipeline spur to China began in March 2006, when CNPC signed an agreement providing state oil producer Transneft $400 million for constructing a pipeline from Skovorodino, about 70 km (43 mi) from the Chinese border. In the same month, CNPC agreed to a set of principles establishing future joint ventures with Rosneft.

In 2006 Putin said Russia would build two gas pipelines for China for a cost of $10 billion. China and Russia disputed about pricing, with Russia wanted China to pay for their gas supplies at European prices, while China wante to pay at developing country prices. In March 2006, CNPC signed a memorandum of understanding (MOU) with Gazprom for the delivery of natural gas to China, which officially began pricing negotiations between Gazprom chief executive Alexei Miller and Chen Geng, then head of the CNPC. In September 2007, the Russian Industry and Energy Ministry approved a development plan for an integrated gas production, transportation, and supply system in Eastern Siberia and the Far East, taking into account potential gas exports to China and other Asia-Pacific countries. Gazprom was appointed by the Russian Government as the Eastern Gas Program execution coordinator.

Russia's desire to diversify its export markets has been matched by China's willingness to invest in Russian energy production and infrastructure. Russian policymakers, however, have expressed reserve about increased Chinese influence in the energy sector. In 2002, CNPC attempted to bid for Russian oil firm Slavneft, but withdrew just weeks later. International news sources suggested the bid failed partly due to anti-foreign sentiment in the State Duma. In 2006, Russia denied CNPC a significant stake in OAO Rosneft. When the Russian company went public, CNPC was allowed to purchase $500 million worth of shares, one-sixth of the $3 billion it had sought. The 2008 financial crisis gave China its opportunity to invest in Russia on a grander scale through a loans for oil program. In 2009 and 2010, China's long-term energy-backed loans (EBL) extended large sums of capital to companies and entities in Russia.

In 2014, Russia and China signed a 30-year gas deal worth $400 billion, the largest in the history of the Russian gas industry. Deliveries to China started in late 2019. The Power of Siberia pipeline is designed to reduce China's dependence on coal, which is more carbon intensive and causes more pollution than natural gas. For Russia, the pipeline allows another economic partnership decoupled from western influence. In 2019, China had acquired a 30 percent and a 20 percent stake respectively in two liquefied natural gas projects in the Yamal District for a total cost of $45 billion.

Chinese imports of Russian natural gas increased significantly after the Russian invasion of Ukraine. In November 2024, China had finished building its China-Russia natural east-route gas pipeline seven months ahead of its schedule. The pipeline links Heilongjiang to Shanghai. According to China Central Television (CCTV), Russian gas would power households in Shanghai by the end of 2024. In December 2024, China completed the full pipeline for the Power of Siberia. As of 2024, crude oil from Russia accounted for almost 20% of China's total energy imports. On 29 October 2025, Shandong Yulong Petrochemical, a major refinery in Shandong Province, increased its imports of Russian oil to a record 370,000–405,000 barrels per day. In December 2025, China became the first buyer of post-sanctions LNG from Russia's Portovaya plant when a Gazprom tanker delivered a cargo to the Beihai terminal, marking the project's first shipment since United States restrictions were imposed.

=== Nuclear energy ===
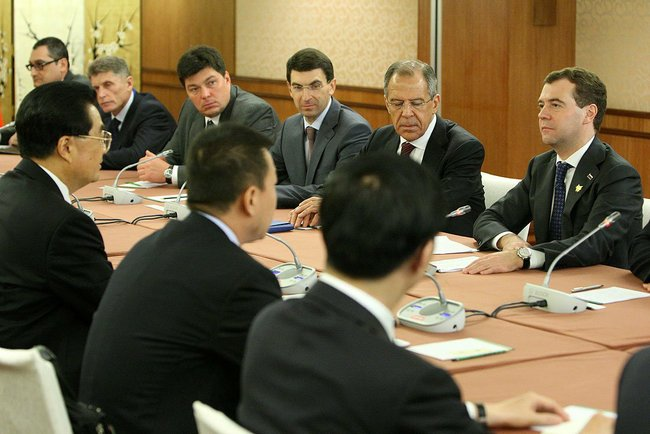
Meeting between Dmitry Medvedev and Hu Jintao at the 2009 APEC Summit.

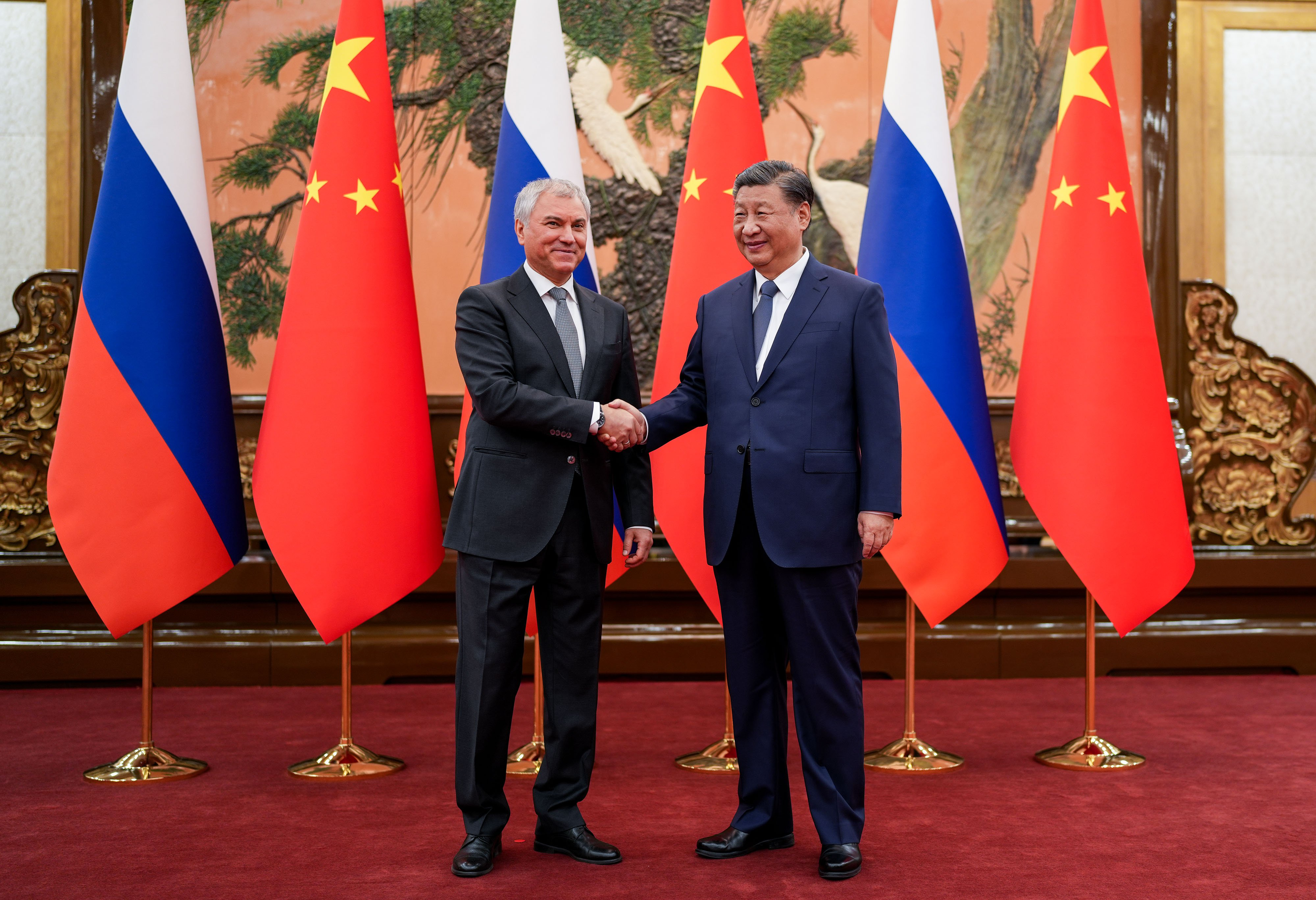
Putin's close associate Vyacheslav Volodin, Speaker of the State Duma, with Chinese leader Xi Jinping in Beijing on 22 November 2023

In September 1999, the two countries began joint construction of a nuclear power station at Lianyungang, Jiangsu Province with an installed capacity of 2 million kW, one of the first situations of mutual energy cooperation. In September 2010, President Putin reaffirmed the potential nuclear future of Russia and China's energy relations, saying "Of course, our cooperation with China is not limited to just hydrocarbons ... Russia is China's main partner in the field of peaceful use of nuclear energy, and equipment supplies here amount to billions of dollars". As of 2011, however, Russian officials have remained reluctant to transfer nuclear energy technologies and other knowledge products to Chinese partners. Industry experts have pointed out that while proprietary technology would protect Russian exports from being displaced by lower-cost Chinese products in third-party markets, such an approach may reinforce Chinese doubts about Russia's reliability as a long-term energy partner.

== Central Asia ==
China and Russia generally cooperate with each other regarding Central Asia affairs. While they sometimes compete in Central Asia, those competitions are typically focused on economic matters and proceed in an orderly way within established norms. Where competition in Central Asia does occur between the two powers, it typically arises as a product of the circumstances rather than as an intentional effort to contain the other country.

In 1996, China, Kazakhstan, Kyrgyzstan, Russia and Tajikistan formed the Shanghai Five, a collaborative body that was renamed the Shanghai Cooperation Organisation (SCO) with the addition of Uzbekistan in 2001. As members of the SCO, China and Russia have cooperated in military exercises, such as counterterrorism drills in Kyrgyzstan in 2002 and similar exercises in Kazakhstan and China in 2003.

Russian and Chinese leaders regularly call for greater cooperation and coordination through the SCO between their two countries in the context of their broader goal of promoting multilateral diplomacy. In a joint statement issued on 23 May 2008, Russia and China asserted that "International security is comprehensive and inalienable, and some countries' security cannot be guaranteed at the cost of some others', including expanding military and political allies." Zhao Huasheng, Director of Russian and Central Asian Studies at Fudan University's Shanghai Cooperation Center, has argued that economic cooperation will ensure the long-term relevance of the SCO, as current security threats recede. While China and Russia do enjoy some bilateral energy cooperation, which experts predict will continue to grow in the future, the two countries have emerged as rivals for Central Asian oil and gas supplies. With the rising oil prices in the mid-2000s, Russia has sought to renew its influence in Central Asia, in particular the region's southern flank, to guarantee access to gas supplies for reexport to Europe and for its own domestic needs. As China's energy needs have grown and its policymakers have sought to develop its western provinces, China, too, has sought to expand its influence in Central Asia.

In 2007, at a meeting of SCO prime ministers in Tashkent, Russian Premier Viktor Zubkov reiterated Moscow's desire to forge a Central Asian energy "club" within the SCO, comprising Russia, China, Kazakhstan, Kyrgyzstan, Tajikistan and Uzbekistan. The SCO energy club could be set up as soon as 2008, Russian Deputy Industry and Energy Minister Ivan Materov announced in Tashkent. Materov insisted, however, that the club would not amount to a sort of mini-OPEC. Political and economic analysts in Moscow believe the Kremlin is keen to establish an energy club as a means to prevent a possible clash with China over Central Asia's energy resources.

Uncertainty over the Prikaspiisky route has given China an opening into the region, especially in Turkmenistan. During a brief visit to Ashgabat, Chinese Premier Wen Jiabao called for efforts "to step up bilateral trade cooperation to a new level." Berdymukhamedov, in turn, expressed interest in "working closely" with China on a natural gas pipeline project, Xinhua News Agency reported. In December 2005, Kazakhstani President Nursultan Nazarbayev inaugurated the Atasu-Alashankou pipeline to ship oil to China. The $800 million Atasu-Alashankou route still needs Russian crude oil from Western Siberia, transported via the Omsk-Pavlodar-Shymkent pipeline, to reach its full annual capacity of 20 million tons by 2010. Although China and its Central Asian partners view their expanding cooperation as a means of diversifying their energy partnerships, Russia has enjoyed success in other major energy projects. In November 2007, two Russian companies (TNK-BP and GazpromNeft) signed an agreement with KazTransOil to ship up to 5 million tons of oil annually to China via the Omsk-Pavlodar-Atasu-Alanshakou pipeline. In the first quarter of 2008, 300,000 tons of Russian crude oil were exported to China along this route. Moreover, a Russian engineering company, Stroytransgaz, won a tender to build Turkmenistan's section of the gas pipeline to China.

== Military relations ==
China has historically been a key purchaser and licensee of Russian military equipment, some of which have been instrumental in the modernization of the People's Liberation Army. After the EU arms embargo on China imposed due to the 1989 Tiananmen Square protests and massacre, China became a reliable client for Russian military exports. From 1992 to 1994, China bought 97% of its military imports from Russia, while from 1990 to 2005, 83% of China's arms imports came from Russia. China spent $5 billion on Russian weaponry from 1993 to 1997. China's imports were a significant relief for Russia's military industry, which had struggled due to the dissolution of the Soviet Union. In 1992, China contracted to purchase a total of seventy-two Sukhoi Su-27 advanced fighter jets, while also providing the knowhow on how to build them, with the sale finalized in December 1996. In 1996, China acquired two Sovremenny-class destroyers equipped with surface-to air and anti-ship missiles, and purchased four Kilo-class submarines. China also bought up to 100 S-300 ground-to-air missiles and rocket launchers.

On 9 November 1993, Russian Defense Minister Pavel Grachev and Chinese Defense Minister Chi Haotian signed a five-year defense cooperation agreement paving the way for an increase in the number of military attachés stationed in their respective capitals. On 12 July 1994, the Russian and Chinese defense ministers signed a border security agreement designed to prevent potentially dangerous military incidents, such as unintentional radar jamming and airspace violations.

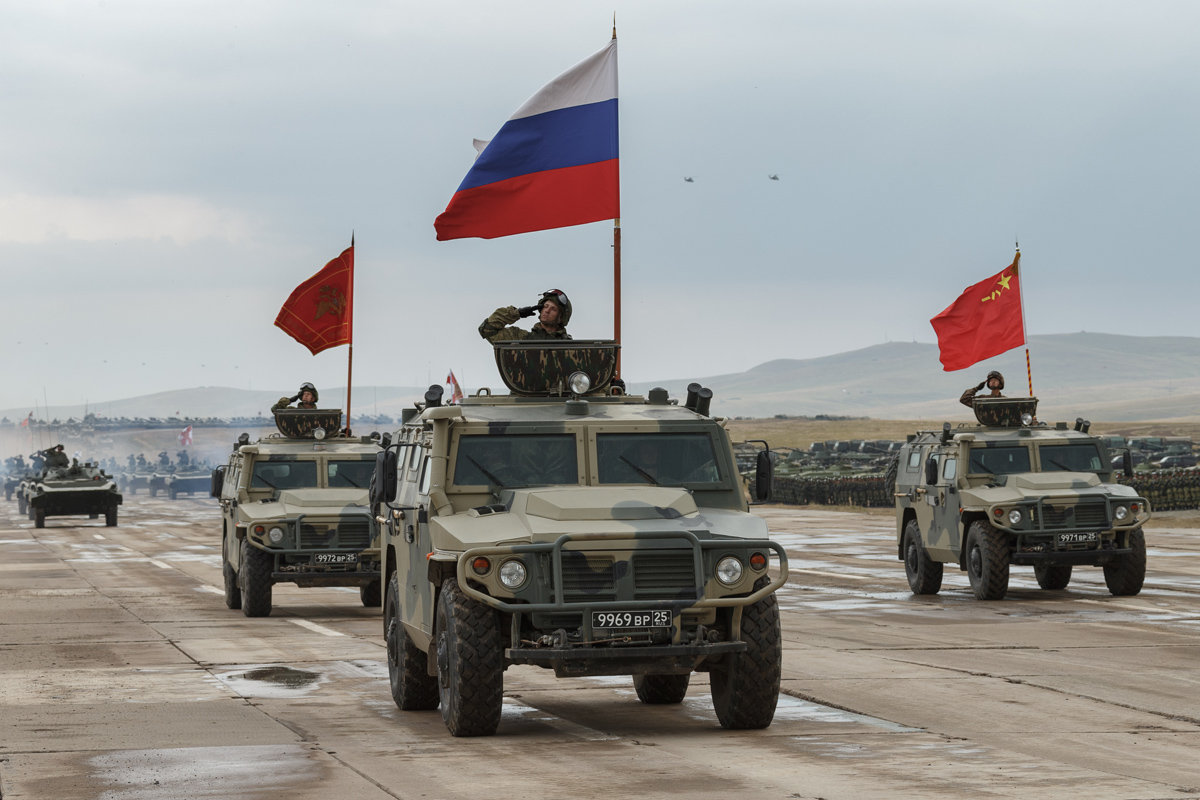
Vostok 2018 exercises in Russia's Eastern Military District

By the early 2000s, Russia was a major supplier of military equipment to China. Economically, Russia was motivated by the weakness of its own economy and the need to pursue revenue streams where they were available. In Russia's geopolitical considerations, Russia assumed that a well-equipped Chinese military was a greater risk to the interests of the United States and European countries than to its own interests. In 2004, the Russian Foreign Ministry blocked both the sale of the Sukhoi Su-35 and Tupolev Tu-22M bombers to China over concerns about the arrangements for Chinese production of the Sukhoi Su-27 fighter jets (known as the Shenyang J-11). From 2000 to 2006, Chinese military imports from Russia declined from $3.2 billion to near zero. China has focused on domestic weapon designs and manufacturing, while still importing certain military products from Russia, such as jet engines. China sought to become independent in its defense sector and become competitive in global arms markets; its defense sector is rapidly developing and maturing. This has led to a decreasing dependence on Russian arms imports; from 2011 to 2021, China's arms imports from Russia fell 46% compared to the previous decade, while Russia's share shrank to 67%. Following deterioration of relations with the West in 2014, Russia became more accepting of giving military technology to China, providing China with the S-400 missile system and a squadron of twenty-four Sukhoi Su-35 fighter jets in 2015 deals worth around $5 billion.

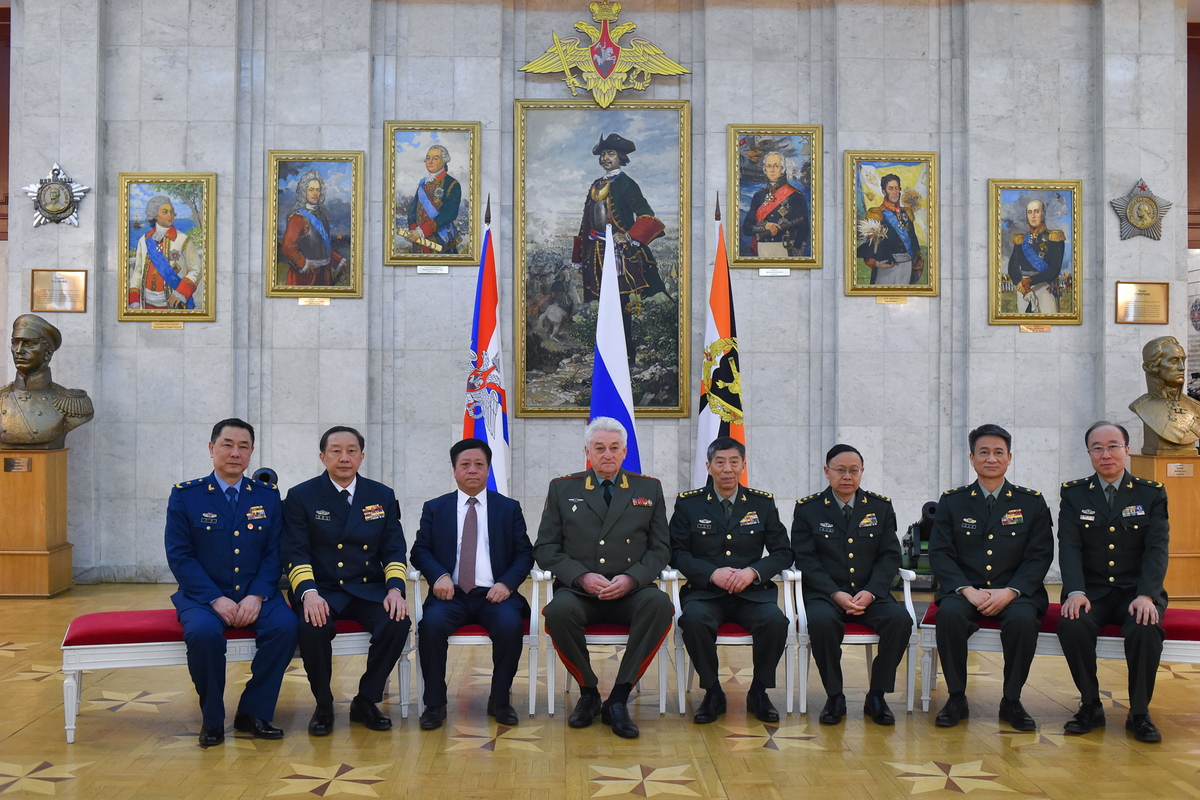
Chinese Defense Minister Li Shangfu visited the Military Academy of the General Staff of the Armed Forces of Russia on 17 April 2023

As early as February 2022, according to US authorities, Russia asked China for advanced military weaponry, in particular, armed drones for use in their invasion of Ukraine. China and Russia have both denied these allegations. In March 2023, Politico reported that Chinese state-owned weapons manufacturer Norinco shipped assault rifles, drone parts, and body armor to Russia between June and December 2022, with some of the shipments going through via third-countries including Turkey and the United Arab Emirates. Norinco is a major supplier of nitrocellulose, a key ingredient in gunpowder, for the Russian military. According to the US Department of Defense, Chinese ammunition has been used on battlefields in Ukraine.

In May 2023, the European Union identified that Chinese and UAE firms were supplying weapon components to Russia. The EU banned export of dual-use goods targeting 8 Chinese firms. In July 2023, the US Office of the Director of National Intelligence published a report stating that the Chinese government is assisting Russia to evade sanctions and providing it with dual-use technology. In October 2023, the US Department of Commerce added 42 Chinese companies to the Entity List for supplying Russia with microelectronics for missile and drone guidance systems. In February 2024, the European Union proposed sanctions that would target Chinese companies aiding Russia's war effort in Ukraine. In April 2025, it was reported that the Russian military has put out recruitment videos across Chinese social media.

=== Military exercises and joint patrols ===
In August 2005, the countries held their first joint exercise, named Peace Mission, where 8,000 troops of the PLA Army, Navy and Air Force partnered with a 1,000-strong Russian naval contingent. The two sides held "military and political consultations" at the headquarters of the Russian Pacific Fleet in Khabarovsk, followed by a visit to Shandong. In August 2007 1,600 PLA troops were dispatched by train to Chelyabinsk for the first Chinese military exercise on Russian soil, joining up with 2,090 Russian soldiers. In July 2009, the two countries sent 1,300 troops each for joint counterterrorism practice in the Russian Far East and the Shenyang Military Region. From 2012 on the former biennial military exercises started taking place at least once a year. Naval manoeuvres between the two countries were held in May 2015 in the Mediterranean Sea, in July 2017 in the Baltic near Kaliningrad and in November 2019 near Cape Town in the partnership of the South African Navy.

In September 2018, Russia hosted the militaries of China and Mongolia as a part of the Vostok 2018 military exercise to improve ties between the countries, making them the first two countries outside of the former Soviet Union to join the exercise. In July 2019, Russia and China flew joint bomber patrols over the Pacific into the Sea of Japan, which was protested by South Korea and Japan. The two countries flew joint bomber patrols again in December 2020.

In September 2022, Russia hosted the military of China as a part of the Vostok-2022 military exercise. In November 2022, Russian and Chinese warplanes including the Tupolev-95 and Xi'an H-6 long range strategic bombers conducted joint patrols over the Sea of Japan and East China sea. In 2024, Chinese and Russian naval fleets held their fourth joint maritime patrol in the Western and Northern Pacific Ocean. The patrol was part of an annual arrangement between the two nations and did not target any third party. Since 2024, PLA soldiers have undertaken combat training, particularly for drone warfare, at a complex near Volgograd.

In July 2024 Russia and China dismissed a U.S. warning regarding their increasing military and economic collaboration in the Arctic, a region increasingly accessible due to climate change. Russia had enhanced its Arctic military presence by revamping Soviet-era bases, while China invested in polar exploration. Kathleen H. Hicks highlighted China's significant role in funding Russian Arctic energy projects and noted joint military exercises near Alaska. The Arctic's melting ice heightened interest in its resources and shipping routes, prompting strategic attention from Washington and NATO allies, particularly Canada. Russia and China defended their activities, emphasizing peace and stability in the region. The U.S. described the Arctic as strategically vital, noting potential increases in activity and risks due to climate change.

=== Partnership ===
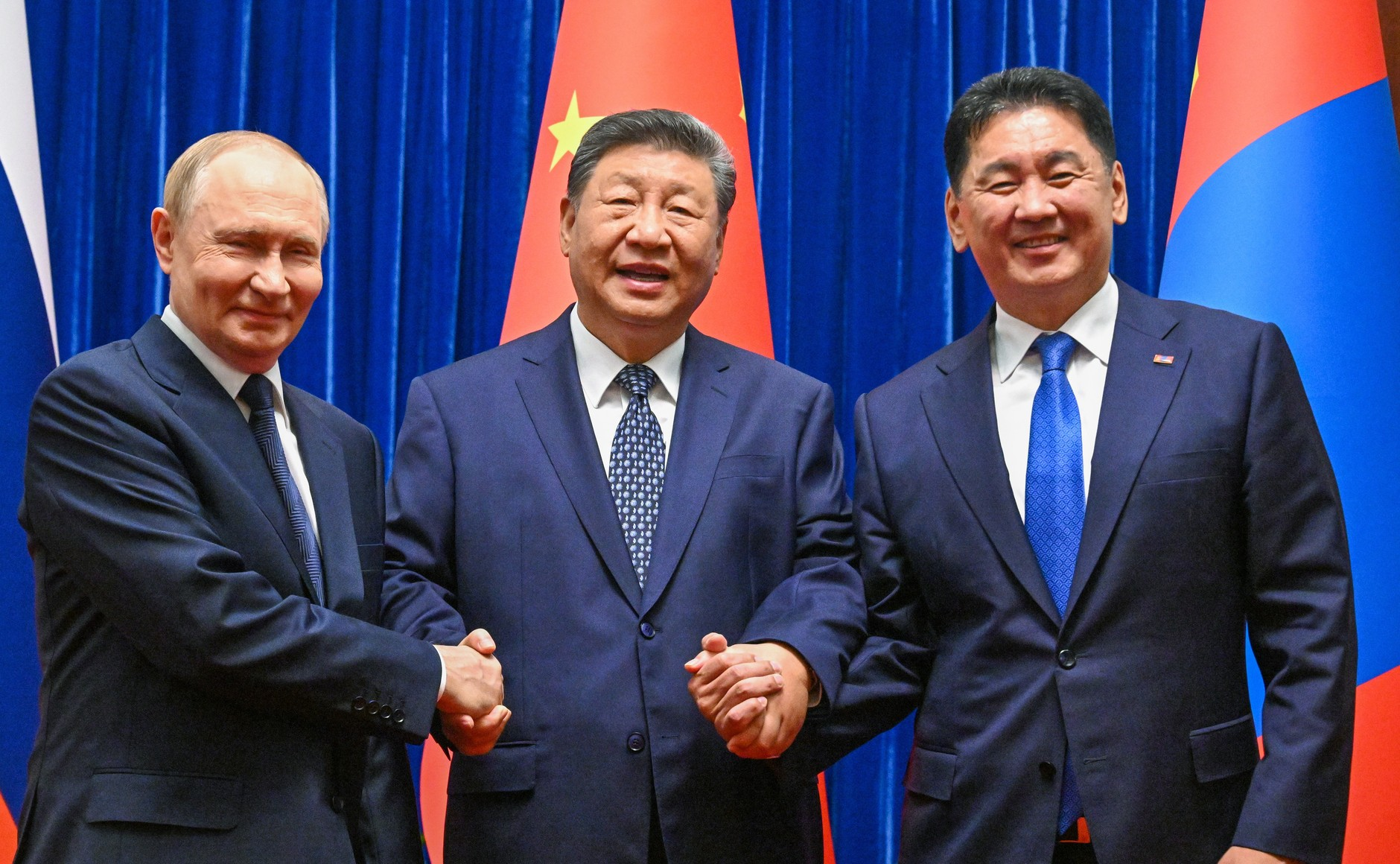
Russian President Putin, Chinese President Xi Jinping and Mongolian President Ukhnaagiin Khürelsükh in Beijing, China, 2 September 2025

China and Russia have enjoyed close relations militarily, economically, and politically, while supporting each other on various global issues. Commentators have debated whether the bilateral strategic partnership constitutes an alliance. Russia supports China's core interests; it recognizes Taiwan as an integral part of the People's Republic of China, and supports China's policies in Hong Kong, Tibet, and Xinjiang.

Russia and China officially declared their relations "Not allies, but better than allies". According to China's former vice minister of foreign affairs Fu Ying in 2016, China had no intentions to create a formal anti-U.S. or anti-Western bloc alliance. In March 2023, Russian president Vladimir Putin, in a comments briefing, assured that there is no military alliance between the two countries and stated that both Russia's and China's armed forces are "transparent". On 17 April 2023, Chinese Defense Minister Li Shangfu made his first overseas visit to Russia. During his meeting, he stated the ties between China and Russia "surpass military-political alliances of the cold war era". In October 2023, Russian and Chinese military officials were reported to have met in Guangzhou to coordinate on how to degrade and defeat Starlink. In November 2023, Russian defense minister Sergei Shoigu stated that the China-Russia defense ties are not aimed to target third parties. Shoigu further added that "unlike certain aggressive western countries," China and Russia "are not creating a military bloc". President Putin called China an ally in November 2024.

Leaked documents seen by the Financial Times in 2024 described a threshold for the country's use of tactical nuclear weapons that is lower than Russia had previously disclosed. The document included training scenarios for a possible invasion by China. In September 2025, a leak of documents showed that Russia had supplied China with equipment and expertise in advanced parachuting capabilities. Analysts believed that such assistance could help China with plans for an invasion of Taiwan. In May 2026, it was reported that three European intelligence agencies believed that over 200 Russians had been covertly trained in drone warfare at military facilities in Beijing and Nanjing.

== Technology relations ==
In the 1990s, China and Russia began to cooperate on space exploration, with Russian experts helping train Chinese taikonauts, design spacesuits and to build the Shenzhou spacecraft and its booster rockets. Joint scientific projects increased in the 2000s, including in biotechnology, high-energy physics, petrochemistry to microelectronics, new materials, laser technology and nanostructures. The two countries also cooperated in Russia's Fobos-Grunt mission, which carried Chinese Mars orbiter Yinghuo-1. In March 2021 the Roscosmos and the China National Space Administration signed an agreement to set up and operate a joint research station on the Moon.

After a Pentagon report released in July 2024 that said Russia had reopened hundreds of Soviet-era military sites in the Arctic, while China was interested in the region's mineral resources and new shipping routes, Russia accused Washington of stoking Arctic tensions.

=== Espionage ===
In December 2019, Rostec officials accused China of intellectual property theft of a range of military technologies. In June 2020, Russia charged one of its Arctic scientists of passing sensitive information to China. On 30 June 2022, Russian laser scientist Dmitry Kolker was arrested on suspicion of passing information to China. In August 2022, Russian hypersonic scientist Alexandr Shiplyuk was arrested in a case of state treason. Reuters reported that Russia accused Shiplyuk for passing classified material at a scientific conference in China in 2017 as reason for the arrest.

In June 2025, The New York Times reported that a leaked internal Russian FSB memo raised concerns about China with respect to industrial espionage of sensitive Russian technologies. The FSB memo also stated that Chinese academics are laying the groundwork for territorial claims against Russia. Information on Russia's weaponry has increasingly been targeted by advanced persistent threats emanating from China.

In May 2026, Kaspersky security researchers identified a "malicious backdoor" planted into Daemon Tools by Chinese-speaking hackers in a coordinated "supply chain attack" that targeted organizations located in Russia, Belarus, and Thailand. In July 2026, The Economist reported that China's spies have long targeted the Rubin Design Bureau to obtain the latest Russian technology to quiet submarines.

== Cultural relations ==
In the early 2000s, cultural ties between the two countries was lacking; Russian media paid more attention to the United States and the European Union, while Chinese preferred studying in Europe, Japan and the United States over Russia. The governments of the two countries agreed to boost cultural ties; 2006 was proclaimed the Year of Russia in China, with a Russian National Exhibition was held in Beijing and over 200 events held throughout China. 2007 was declared as the Year of China in Russia, featuring some 200 activities in what was said to be the largest display of Chinese culture ever mounted abroad. 2009 was declared as the Year of Russian Language in China, 2010 the Year of Chinese Language in Russia. 2012 was declared the Year of Russian Tourism in China, 2013 the Year of Chinese Tourism in Russia. 2016 declared was the Year of Russian Media in China, 2017 the Year of Chinese Media in Russia.

In March 2013, the Voice of Russia and the People's Daily Online signed a news sharing agreement as Xi and Putin presided. On 13 October 2014, Russia Today and the People's Daily Online signed a cooperation agreement. Since at least 2017, the Cyberspace Administration of China has cooperated with Roskomnadzor, Russia's principal internet regulator and censor. In July 2021, the Russian-Chinese Commission for Humanitarian Cooperation agreed to mass-media cooperation. Tourism, especially from China to Russia, has seen a massive spike over the years. More than 2 million Chinese tourists visited Russia in 2019, compared to 158,000 in 2009. As many as 70 per cent of tax-free receipts handed out at Russia's airports go to Chinese citizens. By 2019, Russia has become among the top 3 travel destinations for Chinese tourists. After the Russian invasion of Ukraine and the subsequent deterioration of relations with the West, China's cultural popularity in Russia has grown.

== Mutual perceptions ==
Mutual perceptions have facilitated ideological cohesion and political partnerships between the governments of Russia and China, such as through the issuing of "joint statements between the two countries [which emphasise] the alignment of their respective integration initiatives, such as the [Eurasian Economic Union] and China's Belt and Road Initiative, to enhance connectivity and cooperation in the Eurasian space."

=== Chinese public opinion of Russia ===
According to a 2017 BBC World Service poll, 74% of the Chinese view Russia's influence positively, with 18% expressing a negative view A YouGov survey conducted in 2019 found that 71% of the Chinese think Russia has a positive effect on world affairs, while 15% view it negatively.

During the 2022 Russian invasion of Ukraine, many social media users in China showed sympathy for Russian narratives due in part to distrust of US foreign policy. According to a Carter Center China Focus survey conducted in April 2022, approximately 75% of Chinese respondents agreed that supporting Russia in the Ukraine war was in China's best interest. According to a Genron NPO poll released in November 2022 asking about Chinese peoples' views on the Russian invasion, 39.5% of respondents said the Russian actions "are not wrong", 21.5% said "the Russian actions are a violation of the U.N. Charter and international laws, and should be opposed", and 29% said "the Russian actions are wrong, but the circumstances should be considered."

According to a 2026 feeling thermometer poll by the Carter Center and Emory University, Chinese opinion of Russia was on average 56 out of 100. The poll also found that 43% of the Chinese public believes that China would benefit from a Russian victory in the Ukraine war. 67% agreed and 11% disagreed with the statement that China should cooperate with Russia even if Western countries impose sanctions against Russia, 59% agreed and 18% disagreed that economic cooperation with Russia should be strengthened even if this results in sanctions against China, while 28% agreed and 44% disagreed that China should send troops to aid Russia similar to North Korea.

=== Russian public opinion of China ===
Since 1995, Russians have consistently held positive views of China. According to a 2017 BBC World Service poll, 44% of Russians view China's influence positively and 23% negatively. According to a 2019 survey by the Pew Research Center, 71% of Russians have a favorable view of China, with 18% expressing an unfavorable view. As of September 2022, 88% of Russians surveyed by the Levada Center view China favorably, with only 5% expressing a negative opinion. According to a May 2025 poll by the Levada Center, 64% of Russians consider China to be among Russia's closest friends and allies. According to a January 2026 poll by the Levada Center, 83% of Russians have a favorable opinion of China, while only 5% have an unfavorable opinion.

== Resident diplomatic missions ==
of China in Russia

- Moscow (Embassy)
- Irkutsk (Consulate-General)
- Kazan (Consulate-General)
- Khabarovsk (Consulate-General)
- Saint Petersburg (Consulate-General)
- Vladivostok (Consulate-General)
- Yekaterinburg (Consulate-General)

of Russia in China

- Beijing (Embassy)
- Harbin (Consulate-General)
- Guangzhou (Consulate-General)
- Hong Kong (Consulate-General)
- Shanghai (Consulate-General)
- Shenyang (Consulate-General)

Embassy of China in Moscow

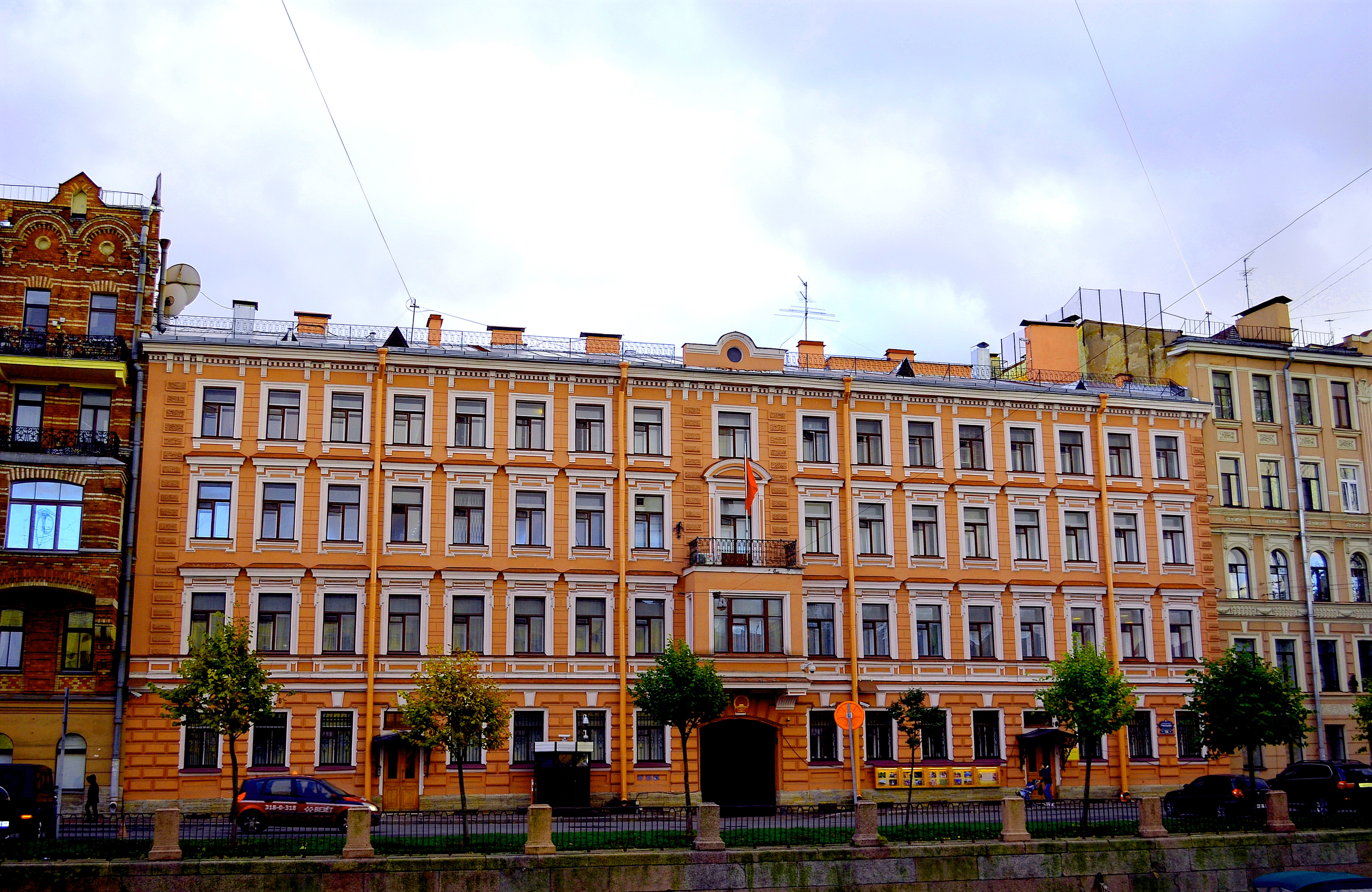
Consulate-General of China in Saint Petersburg

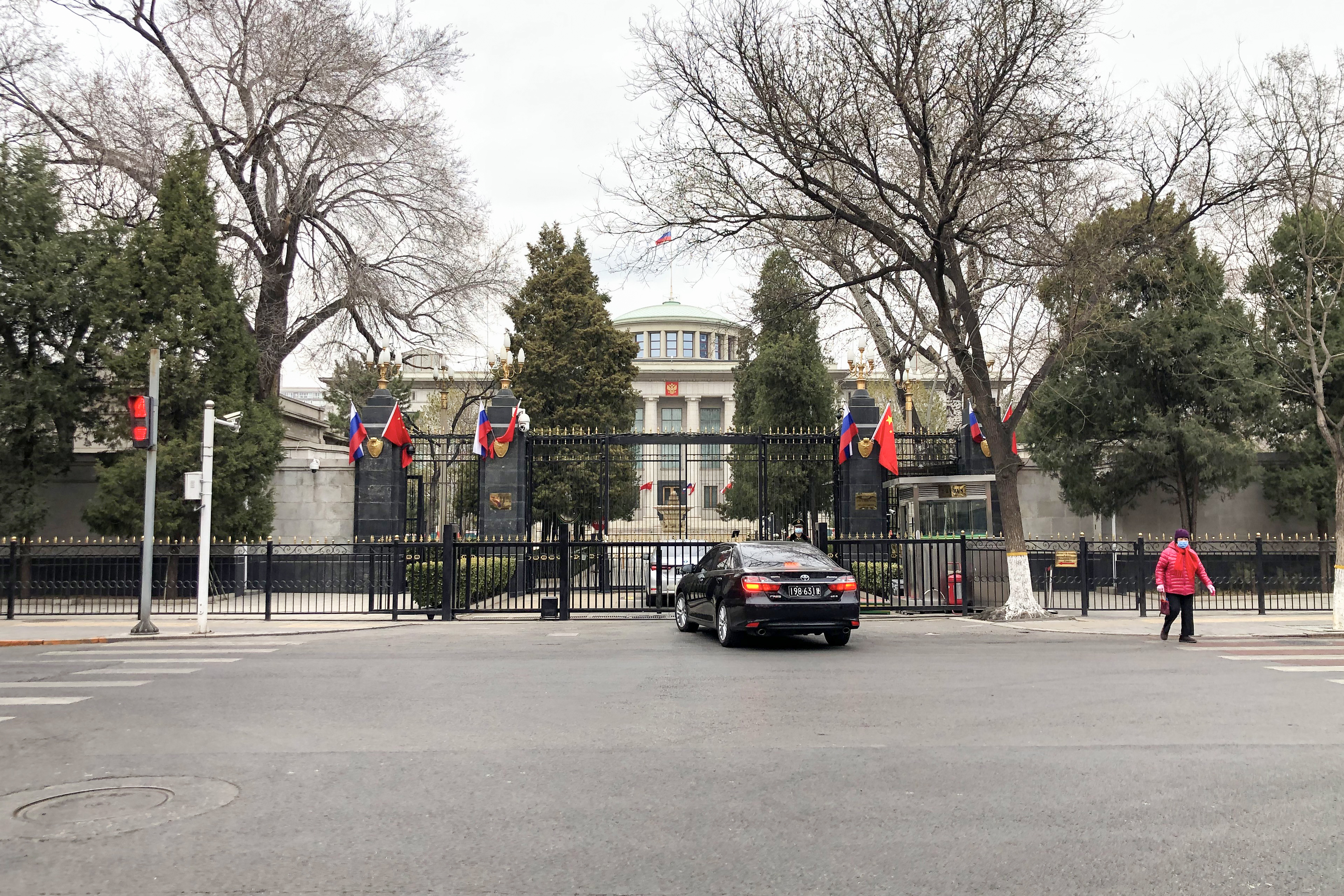
Embassy of Russia in Beijing

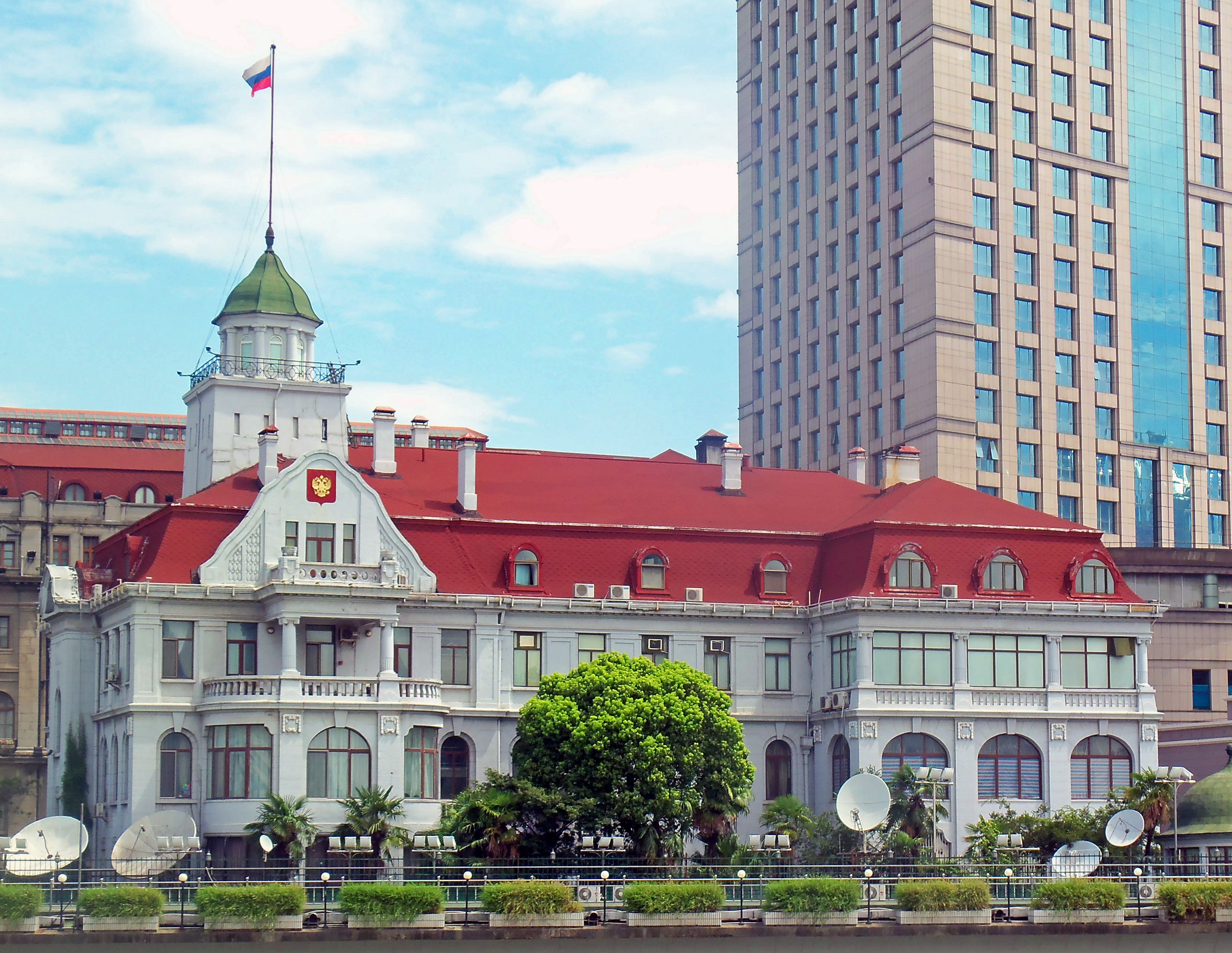
Consulate-General of Russia in Shanghai

== See also ==
- China and the Russo-Ukrainian war
- Ethnic Chinese in Russia
- Foreign relations of China
- Foreign relations of Russia
- Russia's turn to the East
- Russians in China
