= Embassy of China, Ottawa =

Diplomatic mission of the People's Republic of China in Canada

Embassy of China in Canada 中国驻加拿大大使馆 Ambassade de Chine au Canada
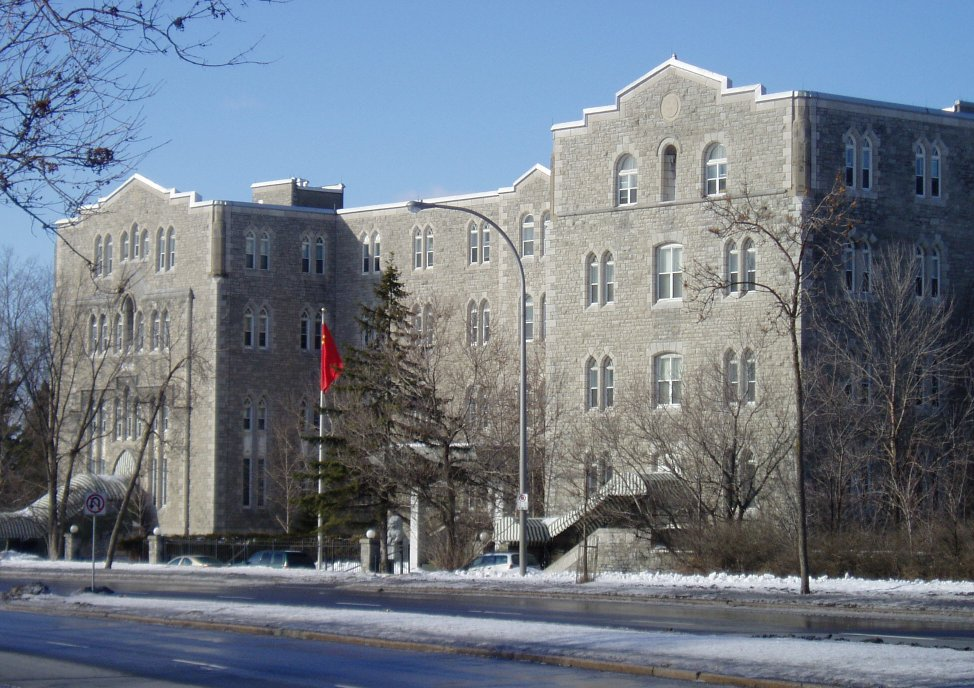
- Location: Lower Town
- Address: 515 St. Patrick Street; Ottawa, Ontario; K1N 5H3
- Coordinates: 45.436377°N 75.684750°W
- Ambassador: Wang Di

The Embassy of the People's Republic of China in Canada (Chinese: 中华人民共和国驻加拿大大使馆; pinyin: Zhōnghuá Rénmín Gònghéguó zhù Jiānádà dàshìguān, French: Ambassade de la République populaire de Chine au Canada) is the embassy of China in Ottawa, Ontario, Canada. China purchased the building at St. Patrick Street in 1972, soon after diplomatic relations were established between Canada and the PRC. The structure had been built by the Sisters of Good Shepherd who had used it as a convent for several decades. The Chinese government paid some $1.6 million for it. In the mid-1980s a major expansion of the structure was completed. The embassy is located in the Lower Town neighbourhood with the rear of the embassy looking out on the Rideau River.

The embassy's consular district covers the Ottawa region, Nova Scotia, Newfoundland and Labrador, Prince Edward Island, and Nunavut.

In November 2019, Cong Peiwu was announced as the new ambassador.

In 2023, the Canadian government expelled a Chinese diplomat after reportedly intimidating a Canadian lawmaker. Zhao Wei was declared persona non grata in Canada after attempting to apply pressure to Conservative MP Michael Chong due to Chong's criticism of China's treatment of the Uyghur Muslim population. In retaliation, China expelled Canada's consul in Shanghai.

Wang Di arrives at the Embassy as the new ambassador in May 2024.

== See also ==
- List of diplomatic missions of China
- Canada–China relations
