= Zhang Qiyue =

Chinese diplomat

- 章启月
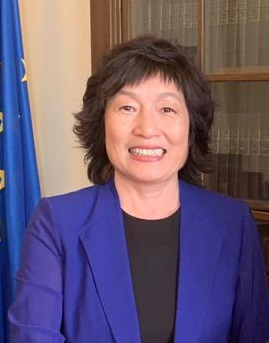
- Zhang in 2019

Chinese Ambassador to Greece
- In office August 2018 – April 2021
- Appointed by: Xi Jinping
- Preceded by: Zou Xiaoli
- Succeeded by: Xiao Junzheng

Consul General of China in New York
- In office December 2014 – May 2018
- Appointed by: Xi Jinping
- Preceded by: Sun Guoxiang
- Succeeded by: Huang Ping

Chinese Ambassador to Indonesia
- In office August 2008 – February 2012
- Appointed by: Hu Jintao
- Preceded by: Lan Lijun
- Succeeded by: Liu Jianchao

Chinese Ambassador to Belgium
- In office February 2005 – July 2008
- Appointed by: Hu Jintao
- Preceded by: Guan Chengyuan
- Succeeded by: Zhang Yuanyuan

Personal details
- Born: October 1959 (age 67) Beijing, China
- Party: Chinese Communist Party
- Spouse: Liu Jieyi
- Children: 1
- Parent(s): Zhang Shu; Xue Runwu
- Education: Beijing Foreign Studies University

Chinese name
- Simplified Chinese: 章启月
- Traditional Chinese: 章啟月
Transcriptions
Standard Mandarin
- Hanyu Pinyin: Zhāng Qǐyuè

Zhang Qiyue (Chinese: 章启月; born October 1959) is a retired Chinese career diplomat. She has served successively as a Spokesperson for the Ministry of Foreign Affairs of China (1999–2005), Ambassador to Belgium (2005–2008), Ambassador to Indonesia (2008–2011), Executive Deputy Secretary of the CPC Committee of the Ministry of Foreign Affairs (2011–2014), Minister-Counselor at the Permanent Mission of China to the United Nations (2014), Consul General in New York (2014–2018), and Ambassador to Greece (2018–2021).

== Biography ==
Zhang was born in Beijing in October 1959, to Zhang Shu, and Xue Runwu (薛润吾), both diplomats. In 1974, Zhang and four other students were selected and sent to the United States to study English, becoming the first batch of students from the People's Republic of China to study in the United States. Zhang returned to China in 1977 and entered Beijing Foreign Studies University.

After graduation in 1982, Zhang was admitted to the United Nations Interpreter Training Course, and then worked as a simultaneous interpreter at the United Nations headquarters in New York City and the Secretariat of the United Nations Office in Geneva. Zhang joined the foreign service in 1987 and was assigned to the Chinese delegation to the United Nations in 1995.

At the end of 1998, Zhang returned to China and became deputy director of the Information Department of the Ministry of Foreign Affairs, concurrently serving as spokesperson for the Ministry of Foreign Affairs of the People's Republic of China since 26 January 1999. Zhang was the third spokeswoman since the position was established in the ministry in 1983.

In February 2005, Zhang was appointed Chinese ambassador to Belgium, taking over from Guan Chengyuan. President Hu Jintao appointed Zhang Chinese ambassador to Indonesia in August 2008, according to a decision of the 11th National People's Congress. Zhang was director of the Organ Committee of the Ministry of Foreign Affairs of the Chinese Communist Party in 2011, and held that office until 2014.

In July 2014, Zhang was appointed minister-counselor of the Permanent Mission of the People's Republic of China to the United Nations. She held the position for only four months; in December she was made consul-general of the People's Republic of China in New York. In August 2018, Zhang was named Chinese ambassador to Greece, according to the 13th National People's Congress decision, a post she held from 2018 until 2021.

== Personal life ==
Zhang is married to politician Liu Jieyi. The couple has a son.

Diplomatic posts
Preceded by Guan Chengyuan	Chinese Ambassador to Belgium; 2005–2008	Succeeded by Zhang Yuanyuan
Preceded by Lan Lijun	Chinese Ambassador to Indonesia; 2008–2012	Succeeded by Liu Jianchao
Preceded by Sun Guoxiang	Consul-General of the People's Republic of China in New York; 2014–2018	Succeeded by Huang Ping
Preceded by Zou Xiaoli	Chinese Ambassador to Greece; 2018–2021	Succeeded by Xiao Junzheng
