= Wang Lutong =

Chinese diplomat

- 王鲁彤
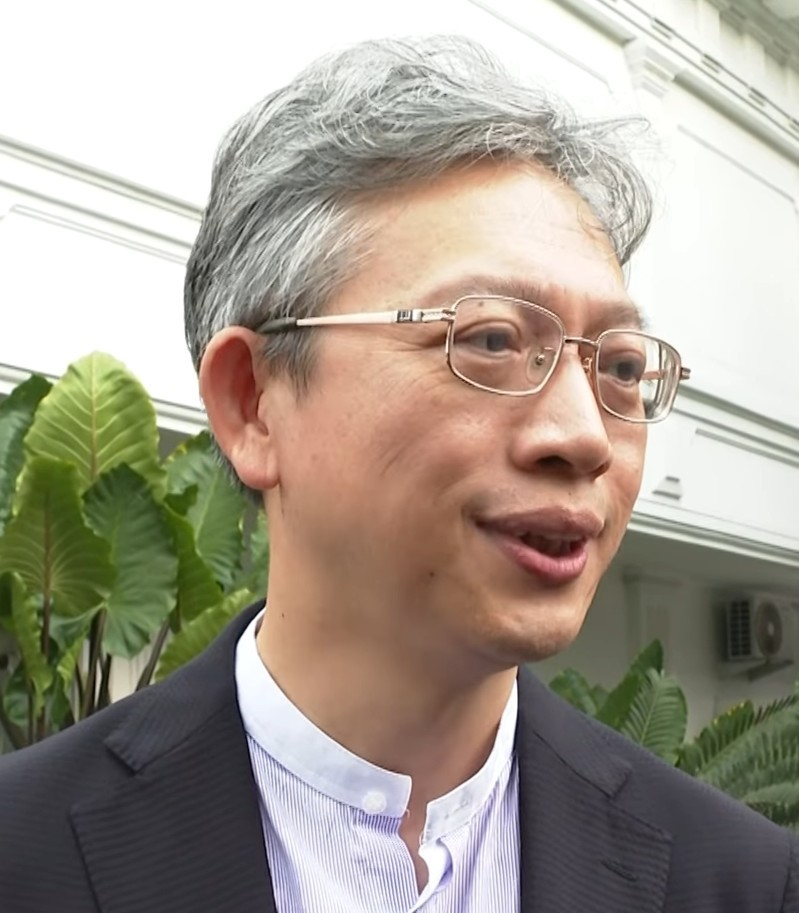
- Wang in 2025

Chinese Ambassador to Indonesia
- Incumbent
- Assumed office November 2024
- Preceded by: Lu Kang

Chinese Ambassador to New Zealand
- In office October 2013 – November 2017
- Preceded by: Xu Jianguo
- Succeeded by: Wu Xi

Personal details
- Born: September 1, 1969 (age 56)
- Party: Chinese Communist Party

Wang Lutong (Chinese: 王鲁彤; born 1 September 1969) is a Chinese diplomat who is currently serving as the Chinese Ambassador to Indonesia after presenting his credentials to Indonesian president Prabowo Subianto on November 4, 2024.

== Biography ==
In 1992, he commenced his career in the Ministry of Foreign Affairs of the People's Republic of China, initially serving in the Information Department until 1996. He held the position of third secretary in the Chinese Embassy in London from 1996 to 2000. He subsequently rejoined the Information Department from 2000 to 2002, serving as third secretary and Deputy Director. From 2002 to 2003, he served as the second secretary and Director of the Department of Western European Affairs. From 2003 to 2005, he held the positions of first secretary and counsellor in the General Office of the Chinese Communist Party. He pursued his career from 2005 to 2007 as a counselor and Director of the Office of the Foreign Affairs Leading Group of the Central Committee of the Chinese Communist Party. He served as Associate Counsel in the same office from 2007 to 2011, subsequently advancing to Counsel from 2011 to 2013. In 2013, he was designated as the Chinese ambassador to New Zealand, a position to which he was accredited on November 26, 2013. From 2017 until 2019, he held the position of deputy director of the Foreign Ministry Protocol Department, thereafter becoming the director of the Foreign Ministry European Affairs Department in 2019. He is additionally accredited to Avarua in the Cook Islands and Alofi in Niue.

In October 2024, he was appointed Ambassador of the People's Republic of China to Indonesia.
