= List of ambassadors of China to Indonesia =

Ambassador of China to Indonesia
- National emblem of China

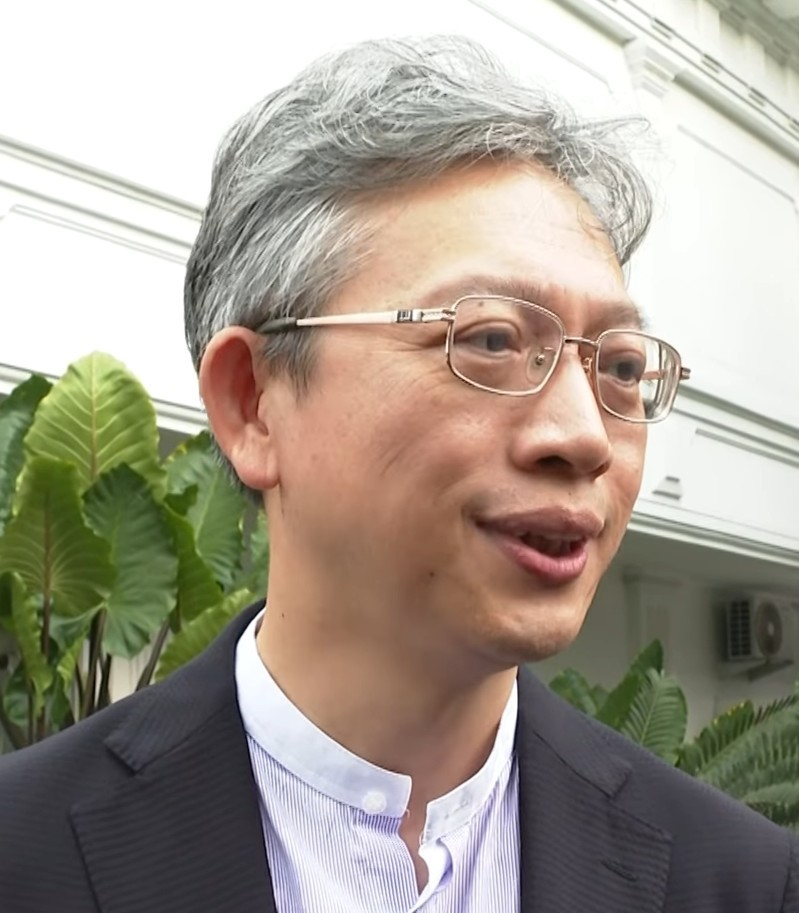
- Incumbent; Wang Lutong since October 2024
- Inaugural holder: Baren
- Formation: 12 June 1950; 76 years ago

The ambassador of China to Indonesia is the official representative of the People's Republic of China to Indonesia.

== List of representatives ==
=== Consul general ===
Name (English)	Name (Chinese)	Tenure begins	Tenure ends	Note
Zhao Zhongshi	赵仲时	1951	26 July 1957	Consul general
Li Jusheng	李菊生	26 July 1957	16 March 1963	Consul general
Xu Ren	徐仁	16 March 1963	28 April 1967	Consul general
Shi Jinkan	师晋侃	28 April 1967	31 October 1967	Consul general

=== Ambassadors ===
Name (English)	Name (Chinese)	Tenure begins	Tenure ends	Note
Baren	王任叔	12 June 1950	November 1951	
Zhong Qingfa	钟庆发	November 1951	22 November 1954	Chargé d'affaires
Huang Zhen	黄镇	21 September 1954	7 May 1961	
Yao Zhongming	姚仲明	19 July 1961	7 April 1966	
Yao Dengshan	姚登山	April 1966	28 April 1967	Chargé d'affaires
Lü Zibo	吕子波	April 1967	September 1967	Chargé d'affaires
Huang Wensheng	黄文胜	September 1967	31 October 1967	
Liu Xinsheng	刘新生	September 1990	3 May 1995	Chargé d'affaires
Qian Yongnian	钱永年	October 1990	3 May 1995	
Zhou Gang	周刚	May 1995	February 1998	
Chen Shiqiu	陈士球	March 1998	April 2002	
Lu Shumin	卢树民	May 2002	February 2005	
Lan Lijun	兰立俊	March 2005	May 2008	
Zhang Qiyue	章启月	August 2008	December 2011	
Liu Jianchao	刘建超	March 2012	February 2014	
Xie Feng	谢锋	June 2014	11 June 2017	
Xiao Qian	肖千	December 2017	25 November 2021	
Lu Kang	陆康	22 February 2022	18 May 2024	
Wang Lutong	王鲁彤	12 October 2024		

== See also ==
- China–Indonesia relations
