= Lu Shumin =

Chinese politician

Lu Shumin (February 1950- , Chinese: 卢树民), a native of Xi'an, Shaanxi, is a politician and diplomat in the People's Republic of China.

== Biography ==
He graduated from the English Department of Xi'an International Studies University in 1966. Beginning in 1972, he enrolled in the Carleton University, and the University of Toronto. In 1976, he commenced his tenure at the Ministry of Foreign Affairs of the People's Republic of China (MOFA), holding successive positions in the Department of American and Oceania, the Embassy of the People's Republic of China in Canada, the Bureau of the Diplomatic Service in Beijing, the Embassy of the People's Republic of China in Australia, and the Department of North American Oceania of the Ministry of Foreign Affairs. In 1993, he was appointed deputy director general of the Department of North America and Oceania. In 1994, he ascended to the position of counselor at the Embassy of the People's Republic of China in the United States, holding the rank of minister, and in 1998, he became director general of the Department of North America and Oceania. Subsequent to the Hainan Island incident, on April 18, 2001, negotiations commenced in Beijing between China and the United States over the collision. Lu Shumin led the Chinese delegation in negotiations with the United States.

In May 2002, he became ambassador to Indonesia. In March 2005, he was designated Ambassador to Canada; in May 2008, he was appointed commissioner of the Office of the Commissioner of the Ministry of Foreign Affairs of the People's Republic of China in the Macao Special Administrative Region; and in August 2011, he assumed the role of executive vice-president and Chinese Communist Party Committee Secretary of the Chinese People's Institute of Foreign Affairs.

Diplomatic posts
Preceded by Wan Yongxiang	Commissioner of the OCMFA; 2008–2011	Succeeded by Hu Zhengyue
Preceded by Chen Shiqiu	Chinese Ambassador to Indonesia; 2002–2005	Succeeded by Lan Lijun
Preceded by Mei Ping	Chinese Ambassador to Canada; 2005–2008	Succeeded by Lan Lijun
