= Wang Di =

Wang Di may refer to:

- Wang Di (diplomat), Chinese diplomat
- Wang Di (referee), Chinese football referee
- Wang Di (wushu), Chinese wushu taolu athlete
