= Embassy of China, Jakarta =

Diplomatic mission

- Location: Jakarta
- Address: Jl. Mega Kuningan No. 2
- Coordinates: 6°13′32″S 106°49′32″E
- Ambassador: Lu Kang
- Website: id.china-embassy.org

The Embassy of China in Jakarta (Indonesian: Kedutaan Besar Tiongkok di Jakarta) is the diplomatic mission of the People's Republic of China in Indonesia, located in the Kuningan area of the Golden Triangle, Jakarta. It was reestablished in 1990 after the normalization of China–Indonesia relations, having been first established in 1950 at a separate location in Glodok.

== History ==
A Chinese consulate general was already present in Jakarta (at that time Batavia) prior to Indonesian independence. By November 1909, negotiations between China and the Netherlands on consular rights were ongoing, and a letter from Chinese legate in The Hague, Lu Zhengxiang, indicated that the Dutch agreed to the opening of a Chinese consulate in the Dutch East Indies. Their bilateral consular convention was signed in 1911. The first consuls were appointed by the new Republic of China government, which took power shortly after the convention. At the outbreak of the Second World War, the consulate was located near Kali Besar, and was headed by a consul-general. It was evacuated due to the Japanese invasion of Java, though the consul-general was captured. By January 1946, a new Chinese consul-general had arrived in Batavia.

The first Chinese Ambassador to independent Indonesia, Wang Renshu, took office in July 1950. Wang acted zealously in attempting to convince Chinese Indonesians to take up Chinese citizenship, managing to attract a significant proportion of Chinese within just one year, annoying the Indonesian government. In 1951, a diplomatic spate occurred when the Indonesian authorities refused entry of Chinese embassy staff. Wang was recalled by 1951. In the aftermath of the 30 September coup of 1965, China sheltered leading Indonesian Communist Party exiles, resulting in mob attacks against the embassy, and formal relations were suspended in October 1967. Just prior to the freezing of the relations, a mob numbering thousands managed to break into the embassy after ramming through the gate with a truck, and the mob pillaged various items within the embassy while setting fire to cars and furniture. In the ensuing clashes, multiple embassy staff and attackers were injured, with one attacker killed. Chinese consular interests afterwards were represented by Romania's embassy.

Some negotiations around the late 1970s indicated that formal relations and embassies would be reestablished, but this did not happen. The former Chinese embassy building in Glodok was taken over by the provincial government; the building was demolished and the space repurposed as a parking lot until it was replaced by a commercial center. After a 23-year freeze, normalization of relations in 1990 resulted in the Chinese embassy being reopened on 27 September 1990, initially as a temporary embassy at Hotel Borobudur.

Muslim groups held large-scale demonstrations at the embassy in protest of the Chinese treatment of Uyghur Muslims in 2018 and 2019.

== Bibliography ==
- Chang, Vincent K. L. (2019). Forgotten Diplomacy: The Modern Remaking of Dutch-Chinese Relations, 1927–1950. BRILL. ISBN 978-90-04-41092-3.
- Wong, John (1984). The Political Economy of China's Changing Relations with Southeast Asia. Macmillan. ISBN 9780333286869.
