= Lan Lijun =

Chinese diplomat

Lan Lijun (born in December 1952, Chinese: 兰立俊), a native of Dafeng, Yancheng, Jiangsu Province, is a diplomat representing the People's Republic of China.

== Biography ==
Lan Lijun completed his studies at the English Department of Beijing Foreign Studies University in September 1974, thereafter pursuing postgraduate studies at Queen's University and McGill University. He joined the Ministry of Foreign Affairs of the People's Republic of China in April 1976. In March 1974, he worked as Attaché at the Embassy of the People's Republic of China in Trinidad and Tobago. In April 1982, he served as Third Secretary of the Department of American and Pacific. In July 1985, he served as vice consul and consul at the Consulate General of the People's Republic of China in Vancouver. In September 1989, he was appointed deputy director and first secretary of the Department of Latin America and the Caribbean within the Ministry of Foreign Affairs; in June 1992, he became consul at the Consulate General of the People's Republic of China in Los Angeles; in April 1996, he was designated director of the Department of American and Pacific within the Ministry of Foreign Affairs; in March 1998, he advanced to counsellor and deputy director-general of the Department of American and Pacific; and in December 2000, he was appointed consul-general of the Consulate-General of China, Los Angeles. In June 2002, he advanced to the minister of the Embassy of China in the United States; in March 2005, he was appointed Ambassador of China to Indonesia. He presented his credentials to president Susilo Bambang Yudhoyono on 29 May 2005.

In June 2008, he was appointed Ambassador of China to Canada. In March 2011, he became Ambassador of China to the Kingdom of Sweden; and in October 2013, he vacated his position.

Diplomatic posts
Preceded by Lu Shumin	Chinese Ambassador to Indonesia; 2005–2008	Succeeded by Zhang Qiyue
Preceded by Lu Shumin	Chinese Ambassador to Canada; 2008–2011	Succeeded by Zhang Junsai
Preceded by Chen Mingming	Chinese Ambassador to Sweden; 2011–2013	Succeeded by Chen Yuming
