= List of ambassadors of China to Belgium =

Ambassador of China to Belgium
- National emblem of China
- Inaugural holder: Li Lianbi
- Formation: 25 October 1971; 54 years ago

The ambassador of China to Belgium is the official representative of the People's Republic of China to the Kingdom of Belgium.

== List of representatives ==
Diplomatic agrément/Diplomatic accreditation	Photo	Ambassador	Chinese name	Observations	Premier of China	Prime Minister of Belgium	Term end
October 25, 1971				The governments in Brussels and Beijing established diplomatic relations	Zhou Enlai	Gaston Eyskens	
December 1, 1973		Li Lianbi	zh:李连璧	With concurrent accreditation as Chinese Ambassador to Luxembourg. (* 1923): In 1941 she left her school in Shanghai and joined a medical team of the New 4th Army.; In 1945 she became head of the department of medicine in a field hospital.; From 1946 until 1949 she headed a medical; In 1962 May he was deputy director of the 2nd Asia department in the Foreign Ministry.; From 1964 Jul to 1966 he was embassy counselor in Warsaw.; 1962 May to Feb 1976 he was ambassador in Brussels.; 1973 Dec Appointed concurrently ambassador to Luxembourg (until Feb 1976); 1975, Sep until Feb 1976 concurrently ambassador to the European Community.; 1976, Aug to Dec of 1980 he was Chinese Ambassador to Congo Brazzaville.; Dec of 1980 to Apr. 1983 he was elected vice-governor of Shaanxi Province.	Zhou Enlai	Edmond Leburton	January 1, 1976
September 1, 1976		Huan Xiang	zh:宦乡	With concurrent accreditation as Chinese Ambassador to Luxembourg.	Hua Guofeng	Leo Tindemans	March 1, 1978
May 1, 1978		Kang Maozhao	zh:康矛召	With concurrent accreditation as Chinese Ambassador to Luxembourg (* 7 April 1919, Wuhan): Political Commissar, PLA -1949; Cultural Attache, Embassy, India 1950; Attache, Embassy, Nepal 1955, Embassy, Afghanistan 1956; Counsellor, Kabul Embassy, Afghanistan 1957–59; Deputy Dir. Information Dept., Ministry of Foreign Affairs 1959–64; Chargé d'affaires (a.i.), Yugoslavia 1964–66; Amb. to Cambodia 1969–74, to Mauritania 1975–78, to EEC 1978–81 and concurrently to Belgium and Luxembourg 1978–81.	Hua Guofeng	Paul Vanden Boeynants	February 1, 1981
March 1, 1981		Zheng Weizhi	zh:郑为之	With concurrent accreditation as Chinese Ambassador to Luxembourg. Born 1912 ... America and Australia Dept., Ministry of Foreign Affairs 1961–64; Amb. to Argentina 1972–77, to Venezuela 1978–81, to Belgium 1981–83 (also accredited to EEC 1981–83); Dir. Inst, of Int. Studies	Zhao Ziyang	Mark Eyskens	February 1, 1983
August 1, 1983		Zhang Shu	zh:章曙	With concurrent accreditation as Chinese Ambassador to Luxembourg.	Zhao Ziyang	Wilfried Martens	August 1, 1985
August 1, 1985		Liu Shan	zh:劉山	With concurrent accreditation as Chinese Ambassador to Luxembourg.	Zhao Ziyang	Wilfried Martens	March 1, 1988
February 1, 1990		Xia Daosheng	zh:夏道生		Li Peng	Wilfried Martens	May 1, 1992
July 1, 1992		Ding Yuanhong	zh:丁原洪		Li Peng	Jean-Luc Dehaene	February 1, 1997
February 1, 1997		Song Mingjiang	zh:宋明江		Li Peng	Jean-Luc Dehaene	October 1, 2001
November 1, 2001		Guan Chengyuan	zh:关呈远		Zhu Rongji	Guy Verhofstadt	January 1, 2005
February 1, 2005		Zhang Qiyue	zh:章启月		Wen Jiabao	Guy Verhofstadt	July 1, 2008
August 1, 2008		Zhang Yuanyuan	zh:张援远		Wen Jiabao	Yves Leterme	May 1, 2011
May 1, 2011		Liao Liqiang	zh:廖力强		Wen Jiabao	Yves Leterme	December 1, 2014
December 1, 2014		Qu Xing	曲星		Li Keqiang	Charles Michel	March 11, 2023

== See also ==
- Ministry of Foreign Affairs of the People's Republic of China
