= Wu Jianmin (democracy activist) =

Chinese dissident

Personal details
- Born: 1963 (age 62–63) Nanjing, People's Republic of China
- Education: Jiangsu Institute of Commercial Management Cadres (Jiangsu Vocational Institute of Commerce (JVIC))
- Occupation: student leader; media; pundit
- Known for: politics, press, education

Chinese name
- Chinese: 吳建民
Transcriptions
Standard Mandarin
- Hanyu Pinyin: Wú Jiànmín

Wu Jianmin (simplified Chinese: 吴建民; traditional Chinese: 吳建民; pinyin: Wú Jiànmín; born 1963) is a Chinese dissident and democracy activist from Nanjing, Jiangsu. He studied at Jiangsu Institute of Commercial Management Cadres and is one of the main leaders at the Nanjing Students' Autonomous Federation.

== Political activism ==
From 1982 to 1986, Wu Jianmin served in the People's Liberation Army Navy. He began studying at the Jiangsu Institute of Commercial Management Cadres in 1987.

In 1989, Wu participated in the student-led democracy movement and was elected as a leader. He organized and led the 1989 Tiananmen Square protests at many Nanjing universities. On the morning of June 1, Wu led a student procession of about 10,000 people from Gulou square in Nanjing to support the Tiananmen Square protests. On June 4, the student procession led by Wu went to a small town called Zhang Baling in Chuzhou in Anhui Province. He was sent back to Nanjing by the Chinese Communist Party (CCP).

After the June 4th movement, he formed a political party called the China Democracy Front, and served as the chairman. In the summer of 1990, when the first issue of the China Democracy Front magazine was published, he was found by the Nanjing Public Security Bureau.

== Imprisonment ==
Wu Jianmin is a member of a democratic movement which was suppressed by the CCP. In 1990, Wu was arrested by the Ministry of State Security of the People's Republic of China. In July 1991, he was sentenced to 10 years of imprisonment for being "the arch-criminal of organizing and leading a counter-revolutionary group". He is listed as political prisoner No. 001 of arrest by the Ministry of State Security in Nanjing and secretly detained in the military prison.

On November 17, 1991, US Secretary of State James Baker visited China and requested for the Chinese government to release political prisoners, including Wu Jianmin. However, Chinese Foreign Minister Qian Qichen used the director of the Information Department of the Chinese Foreign Ministry, whose name was also Wu Jianmin, to confuse the public and deceive Baker. The Chinese government did not release the detained student leader Wu Jianmin.

== After release ==
Wu Jianmin was early released from prison in 1997 after American government's negotiation.

Wu went into exile in the United States in 2015. In 2017, he founded the channel Jianmin On Overthrowing Autocracy on YouTube. In the fall of 2018, Wu Jianmin made a special visit to James Baker, former Secretary of State of the United States, at Rice University's Baker Institute in Houston, Texas.

Wu was invited to attend commemorative activities for the 1989 Tiananmen Square protests and massacre and delivered speeches in Washington, D.C., Vancouver, Toronto, Los Angeles, San Francisco, Chicago, New Yorkas well as in other places. Voice of America and Radio Free Asia often invite Wu as a guest to comment on current affairs.
