= Indonesia–Mongolia relations =

Bilateral relations of Indonesia and Mongolia

- Indonesia: Mongolia

Diplomatic mission
- Embassy of Indonesia, Beijing: Embassy of Mongolia, Jakarta

Indonesia–Mongolia relations refer to foreign relations between Indonesia and Mongolia since 1956. Both countries are members of the Asia Cooperation Dialogue, Forum of East Asia-Latin America Cooperation, Non-Aligned Movement, World Trade Organization and the United Nations.

== History ==
In 1293, the Mongol led Yuan Dynasty launched a punitive expedition against the king of Singhasari, Kertanegara. This event marked the first major interaction between the Mongols and the people of the Nusantara archipelago.

Indonesia and Mongolia established diplomatic relations on 21 December 1956.

Mongolia is planning to have a Center of Indonesian Studies, located in Mongolian National University. This institution will serve as a learning center for Mongolian students, professors and common people wishing to learn various aspects of Indonesian studies, includes language, culture, history, politics and economy.

On 19 January 2022, the Mongolian and Indonesian Ministries of Foreign Affairs convened a virtual meeting. The parties talked about the potential to resume some of the activities that had been put on hold because of the COVID-19 pandemic. In particular, it was discussed that the regular meeting of the Joint Commission between the two governments and the Business Forum should take place in the middle of the year. The Mongolian side reiterated its commitment to deepen political dialogue with Indonesia, a significant ASEAN member, and to broaden cooperation in the areas of trade, economy, investment, agriculture, tourism, culture, and humanity as part of its policy to deepen ties and cooperation with nations in the Asia-Pacific region.

On 28 June 2023, Indonesian foreign minister Retno Marsudi paid a visit to Mongolia and held talks with Mongolian foreign minister Battsetseg Batmunkh. While reviewing and assessing the state of cooperation in trade and economic sectors, the two ministers discussed how to expand bilateral relations and collaboration to sectors including tourism, culture, and agriculture. Additionally, they decided to fortify their shared commitments on a regional and global level.

On 17 July 2023, Mongolian foreign minister Battsetseg Batmunkh met with business executives from Indonesia on the sidelines of the ASEAN Regional Forum Foreign Ministers’ Meeting in Jakarta. In order to create a cooperative mechanism between the two nations, she made a proposal for cooperation to the Indonesian Chamber of Commerce and Industry's management during the meeting. In order to link the economic communities of the two nations, the Parties decided to host a business forum in Ulaanbaatar soon.

On 4 November 2024, Ambassador Extraordinary and Plenipotentiary of Mongolia to the Republic of Indonesia, D. Enkhtaivan Dashnyam, gave Indonesian president Prabowo Subianto a presentation of his credentials.

On 26 November 2024, the Mongolian flag was raised in Jakarta to mark the 100th anniversary of the Republic's Proclamation and the First Constitution's adoption.

== High level visits ==
There are three Indonesian presidents that have visited Mongolia. Indonesia's first president, Sukarno in 1956, Megawati Soekarnoputri in 2003, and Susilo Bambang Yudhoyono in September 2012.

From 21 to 22 May 2025, Mongolian foreign minister Battsetseg Batmunkh paid an official visit to Indonesia at the invitation of Indonesian foreign minister Sugiono. A Memorandum of Understanding on Cooperation was signed by the two foreign ministers during the official visit. Its objectives include defining new areas and directions for cooperation, creating a mechanism for consultations on regional and international issues of mutual interest, promoting the exchange of young diplomats, and making it easier to organize joint training programs.

== Diplomatic missions ==
- Currently, the Indonesian embassy in Beijing is accredited to Mongolia.
- Mongolia has an embassy in Jakarta which once closed in 2018. In 2023, the country announced plans to reopen the embassy until it formally reopened in November 2024. Previously, the Mongolian embassy in Bangkok was accredited to Indonesia. Mongolia also hosts honorary consulates in Jakarta and Surabaya.

== See also ==
- Foreign relations of Indonesia
- Foreign relations of Mongolia
- Mongol invasion of Java
