= Huang Ping =

Chinese diplomat

- 黄屏
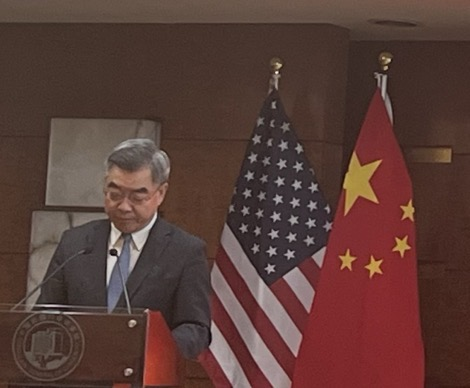
- Huang Ping

Consul General of China in New York
- In office November 2018 – September 2024
- Appointed by: Xi Jinping
- Preceded by: Zhang Qiyue
- Succeeded by: Chen Li

Personal details
- Born: January 1963 (age 63)
- Party: Chinese Communist Party

Huang Ping (Chinese: 黄屏; born January 1963) is a Chinese diplomat who most recently served as Consul General of the People's Republic of China in New York from 2018 to 2024.

== Career ==
Huang assumed his position as consul general in New York in November 2018. He previously served as China's ambassador to Zimbabwe and as consul general in Chicago.

== Linda Sun indictment ==
According to September 2024 indictment of Linda Sun, the deputy chief of staff to New York governor Kathy Hochul, Huang frequently coordinated with Sun in attempts to influence the governor on behalf of the Chinese Communist Party. Huang was labeled in Sun's indictment as "PRC Official-1". Following the indictment, the Chinese consulate stopped publicizing as many of its activities on social media.

Following the release of the indictment, Hochul requested that Secretary of State Antony Blinken have Huang expelled. The US State Department said Huang left his post at the end of August. The consulate's official website lists Huang as having served until September 2024. He was succeeded by Chen Li (Chinese: 陈立).
