= Qian Yongnian =

Chinese diplomat (1933–2025)

Qian Yongnian (Chinese: 钱永年; August 1933 – 26 July 2025) was a Chinese diplomat of the People's Republic of China.

== Life and career ==
A native of Suzhou, Jiangsu, Qian graduated from the English Department of the Beijing Institute of Foreign Languages in 1952. He joined the Chinese Communist Party in 1956. He served as deputy director of the Africa Department of the Ministry of Foreign Affairs; minister-counselor of the permanent mission to the United Nations; minister-counselor and minister of the embassy to the United States; and director of the Foreign Affairs Office of the State Council. In 1990, he became China's ambassador to Indonesia after China and Indonesia reestablished diplomatic ties. Later, he served as Chairman of the China Asia-Africa Development and Exchange Association and head of the Chinese delegation to the four-party talks on the DPRK. Qian died on 26 July 2025, at the age of 91.

Diplomatic posts
Preceded by Liu Xinsheng	Chinese Ambassador to Indonesia; 1990–1995	Succeeded by Zhou Gang
