= Embassy of Indonesia, Beijing =

Embassy of the Republic of Indonesia in Beijing Kedutaan Besar Republik Indonesia di Beijing 印度尼西亚共和国驻华大使馆

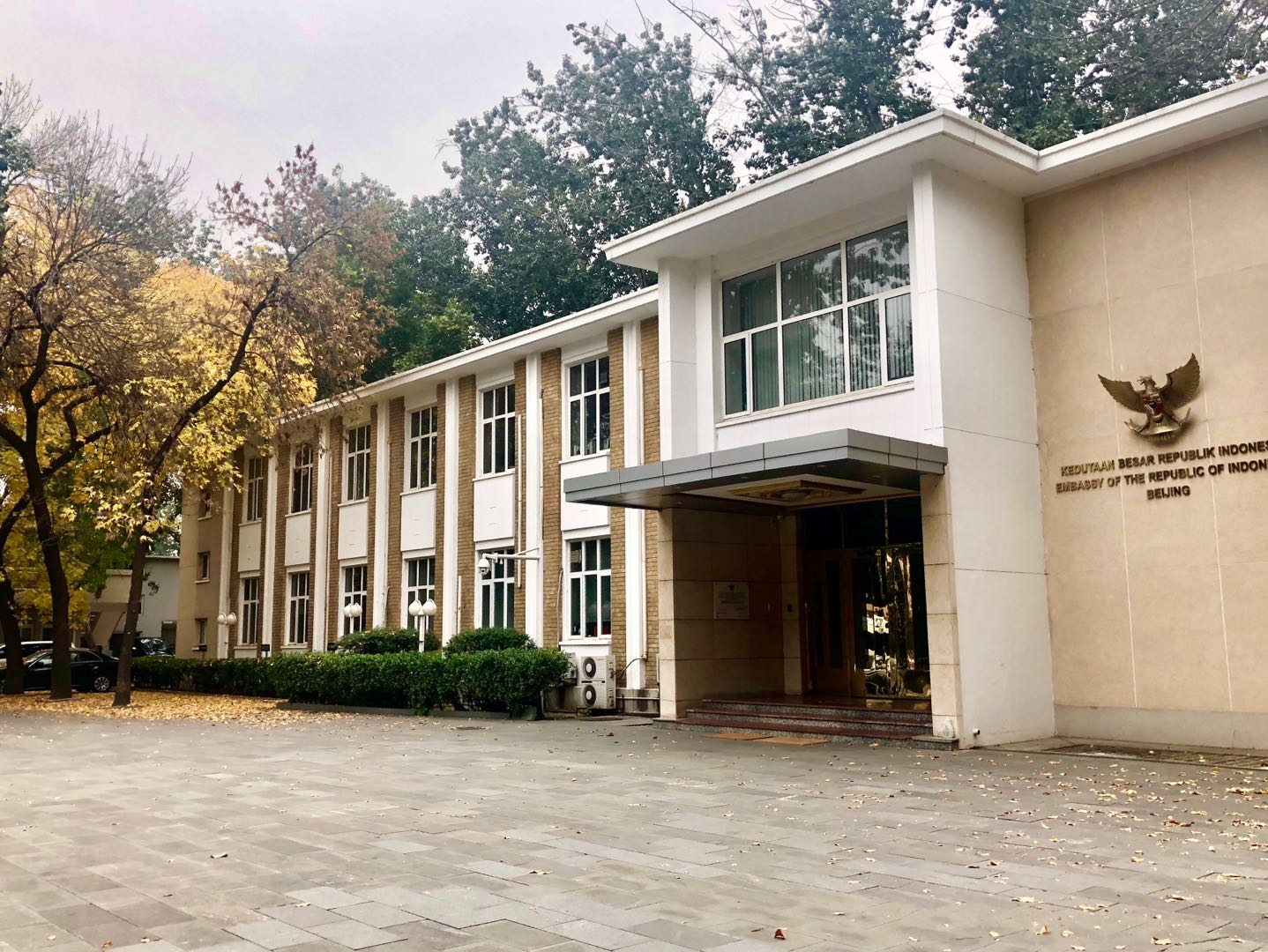
- Location: Beijing, China
- Address: 4, Dongzhimenwai Dajie; Chaoyang District; Beijing, 100600, China
- Coordinates: 39.9395°N 116.4540°E
- Ambassador: Djauhari Oratmangun
- Jurisdiction: China; Mongolia
- Website: kemlu.go.id/beijing/en/

The Embassy of the Republic of Indonesia in Beijing (Indonesian: Kedutaan Besar Republik Indonesia di Beijing; Chinese: 印度尼西亚共和国驻华大使馆) is the diplomatic mission of the Republic of Indonesia to the People's Republic of China. The embassy is concurrently accredited to Mongolia. Indonesia also has three consulate generals in Guangzhou, Hong Kong, and Shanghai. The first Indonesian ambassador to China was Arnold Mononutu (1953–1955). The current ambassador, Djauhari Oratmangun, was appointed by President Joko Widodo on 20 February 2018.

== History ==
Diplomatic relations between Indonesia and China were established on 13 April 1950. The Indonesian government sent Isak Mahdi from the Indonesian embassy in Bangkok to Beijing to establish a diplomatic mission. Mahdi was then appointed Chargé d'affaires of the mission until the arrival of the first Indonesian ambassador to China, Arnold Mononutu.

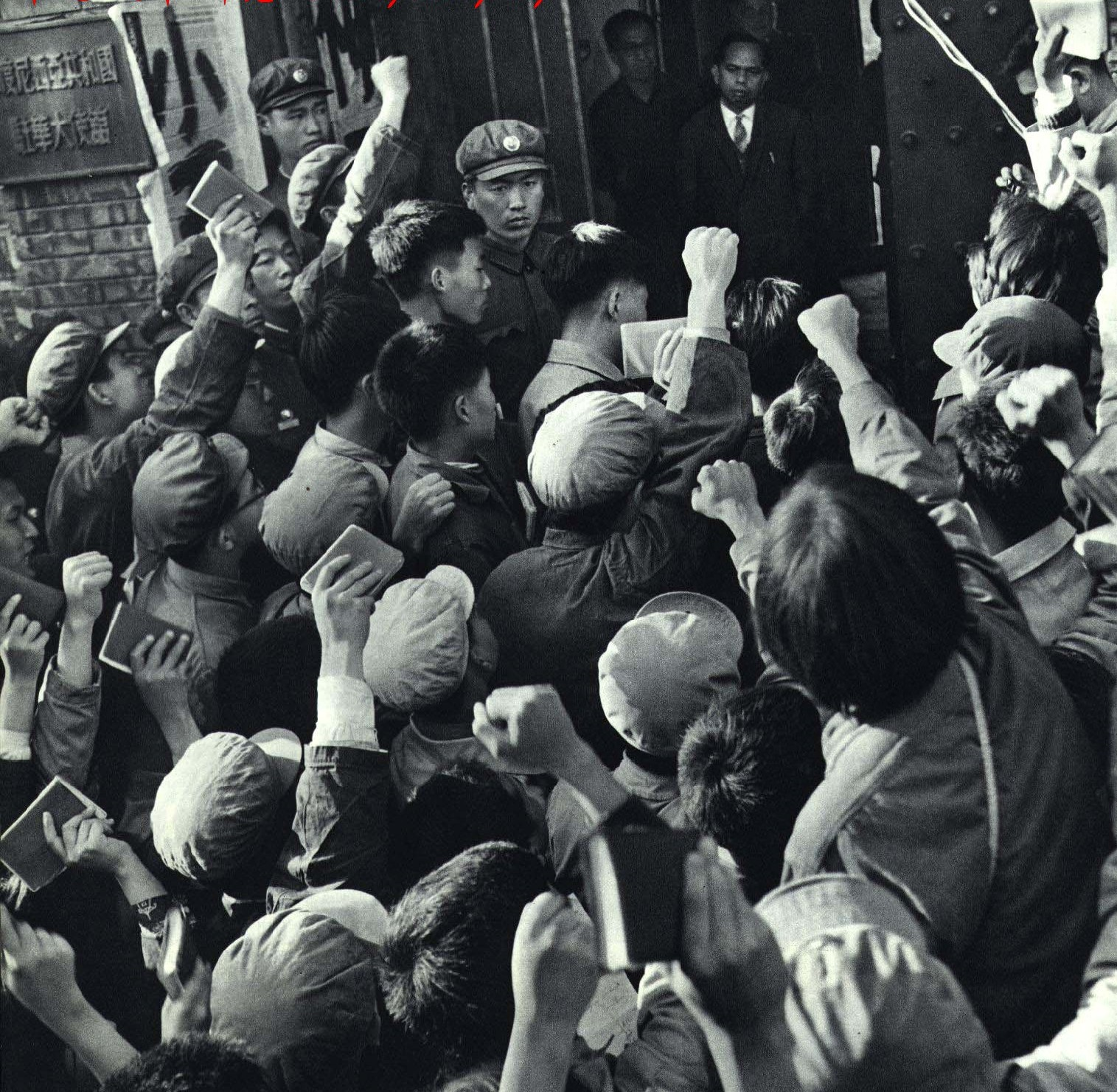
Protest at the Indonesian embassy in April 1967

The period between the failed 30 September Movement in 1965 and the transfer of power in Indonesia from Sukarno to Suharto in 1967 saw the deterioration of Indonesia–China relations. The Indonesian government assumed that China was involved in the 30 September Movement that killed six high ranking generals of the Indonesian National Armed Forces. On 30 October 1967, Indonesia froze its relations with China. Tensions were high leading up to the severing of ties between the two countries. Several large demonstrations in front of the Indonesian embassy included in April when 'revolutionary masses' forced their way into the embassy and in August when the Red Guards stormed the embassy. Such violent incidents also beset the Chinese embassy in Jakarta. The Indonesian government deemed that the ambassador in China at the time, Djawoto, was left-leaning and sympathetic to the Communist Party of Indonesia. His citizenship was even revoked by the government causing him to never return to Indonesia.

After more than 20 years of frozen diplomatic relations, on 23 February 1989, Indonesia and China announced that the two countries would restart diplomatic relations. This statement was announced after a meeting between President Suharto and Foreign Minister Qian Qichen of China in Tokyo, Japan, during Suharto's visit to the country to attend the funeral of Emperor Hirohito. Before this announcement, the two countries had already resumed free trade after an agreement was signed in July 1985. On 3 July 1990, a joint communiqué signed in Beijing stated that the official restart of diplomatic relations will commence on 8 August 1990. The first Indonesian ambassador to China after relations recommenced was Abdurrachman Gunadirdja (1990–1994).

In the 1950s, the chancery was located at Lishi Hutong in the Dongcheng District of Beijing. After the relations recommenced in 1990, the chancery was located at Building B of the Sanlitun Diplomatic Building Office in the Chaoyang District. In July 2004, the embassy moved to its current location at Dongzhimenwai Dajie.

== See also ==
- China–Indonesia relations
- Indonesia–Mongolia relations
- List of diplomatic missions of Indonesia
- List of diplomatic missions in China
