= List of ambassadors of China to Luxembourg =

Coordinates: 49.636555°N 6.143731°E

Chinese Ambassador to Luxembourg
- Incumbent; Huang Changqing since June 2015
- Inaugural holder: Wunz King
- Formation: 30 December 1948; 77 years ago

The Chinese ambassador to Luxembourg is the official representative of the People's Republic of China to the Grand Duchy of Luxembourg.

== History ==
- The Republic of China (ROC) and Luxembourg recognised each other. From 1948 to 26 October 1971, the Taiwanese Ambassador in Brussels was accredited in Luxembourg City.
- On 16 December 1964, the diplomatic rank of the Legation in Luxembourg City was elevated to that of an embassy.
- On 26 October 1971, diplomatic relations between the People's Republic of China (PRC) and Luxembourg was established.
- Since April 1988, the ambassador has his/her residence in Luxembourg City.

== List of representatives ==
Diplomatic agrément/Diplomatic accreditation	Ambassador	Chinese language zh:中国驻卢森堡大使列表	Observations	Premier of the Republic of China	List of prime ministers of Luxembourg	Term end
December 30, 1948	Wunz King	zh:金问泗		Weng Wenhao	Pierre Dupong	January 1, 1954
January 1, 1954	Wang Xiaoxi	zh:汪孝熙	with residence in Brussels. (*1905 - December 12, 1962 in Brussels.), After graduating from the University of Geneva, Switzerland, he served as the Ministry of Foreign Affairs.; In 1944 he was counselor in Brusles, and later the Ministry of Foreign Affairs East Asia Secretary.; In 1953, he became Chinese Ambassador to Belgium with concurrent accreditation in Luxembourg.; His father Wang Rongbao is also the diplomatic envoy of the Republic of China, served as the Republic of China in Belgium, Switzerland, Japan.; His brother Wang Yanxi, four younger brother Wang Jixi also with the diplomat.	Yu Hung-Chun	Pierre Werner	December 1, 1962
March 1, 1963	Chen xiongfei	zh:陈雄飞	(* February 27, 1911 in Shanghai January 7, 2004 in Taipei ): studied at the Aurora University received a doctoral study in France, the University of Paris received a doctorate in international law.; In 1943 he entered the foreign Service in China.; In 1949 he was first secretary at the Chinese embassy in Paris.; From 1963 to 1965 he was Chinese Ambassador to Belgium with concurrent accreditation in Luxembourg City.; In 1973 he was ambassador in Montevideo Uruguay.	Chen Cheng	Pierre Werner	January 1, 1965
January 1, 1965	Chen xiongfei	zh:陈雄飞	The Mission was upgraded to embassy but the ambassador had his residence in Brussels.	Yen Chia-kan	Pierre Werner	June 1, 1971
June 1, 1971	Li Lian-pi	zh:王蓬	(*1911 in Shanghai- 1992): graduated from Shanghai Aurora University, Paris Central University.; with residence in Brussels.	Yen Chia-kan	Pierre Werner	October 1, 1972
October 26, 1971			Recognition of the People's Republic of China (PRC)			

Diplomatic agrément/Diplomatic accreditation	Ambassador	Chinese language zh:中国驻卢森堡大使列表	Observations	Premier of the People's Republic of China	List of prime ministers of Luxembourg	Term end
December 1973	Li Lianbi	zh:李连璧	with residence in Brussels.	Zhou Enlai	Gaston Thorn	January 1976
September 1976	Huan Xiang	zh:宦乡	with residence in Brussels.	Hua Guofeng	Gaston Thorn	March 1978
May 1978	Kang Maozhao	zh:康矛召	with residence in Brussels.	Hua Guofeng	Gaston Thorn	February 1981
March 1981	Zheng Weizhi	zh:郑为之	with residence in Brussels.	Zhao Ziyang	Pierre Werner	February 1983
August 1983	Zhang Shu	zh:章曙	with residence in Brussels.	Zhao Ziyang	Pierre Werner	August 1985
August 1985	Liu Shan (PRC diplomat)	zh:刘山 (外交官)	with residence in Brussels.	Zhao Ziyang	Jacques Santer	March 1988
April 1988	Lu Qiutian	zh:卢秋田		Li Peng	Jacques Santer	August 1990
September 1990	Zhao Liang (PRC diplomat)	zh:赵梁		Li Peng	Jacques Santer	November 1994
November 1994	Shi Yanhua	zh:施燕华		Li Peng	Jacques Santer	February 1998
March 1998	Ding Baohua	zh:丁宝华		Zhu Rongji	Jean-Claude Juncker	July 2002
April 2002	Sun Rongmin	zh:孙荣民		Zhu Rongji	Jean-Claude Juncker	June 2007
August 2007	Ma Zhixue	zh:马志学		Wen Jiabao	Jean-Claude Juncker	August 2010
August 2010	Zeng Xianqi	zh:曾宪柒		Wen Jiabao	Jean-Claude Juncker	June 2015
June 2015	Huang Changqing	zh:黃長慶		Li Keqiang	Xavier Bettel	
