= Shi Yanhua =

Chinese interpreter and diplomat

- Born: December 1939; Shanghai, Republic of China
- Spouse: Wu Jianmin

Shi Yanhua (Chinese: 施燕华; b. December 1939 in Shanghai) was a Chinese government official interpreter and scholar. She served as high level interpreter for Deng Xiaoping's 1979 visit to the United States and Ambassador to Luxembourg.

Her husband, Wu Jianmin, was China's ambassador to the Netherlands. He was killed in an automobile crash in 2016.

== Education ==
In 1958, she was admitted to the Beijing Foreign Studies University under the Ministry of Foreign Affairs and became an English major. After graduating from university in 1963, she obtained a postgraduate degree. In 1965, the Ministry of Foreign Affairs recruited her as an intern. From 1971 to 1975, she worked in the Permanent Mission of China to the United Nations.

One study observed that in China at that time, students who graduated from a foreign language program were expected to serve as translator but to take on the role of interpreter, depending on the need, pointing to Ms. Shi as "one of the top interpreters in the Ministry of Foreign Affairs."

== Diplomatic career ==
While working in the Translation Office of the Ministry of Foreign Affairs from 1975 to 1985, she served as high-level interpreter for Deng Xiaoping's 1979 visit to the United States in 1979. In 1980, she interpreted for Deng in his interview with the Italian journalist, Oriana Fallaci.

From 1985 to 1988, she was counselor of the Permanent Mission to the United Nations. From 1989 to 1990, she served in the mission to the European Community and the counselor of the embassy in Belgium. From 1991 to 1994, she directed the Translation Office of the Ministry of Foreign Affairs, responsible for finalizing translations. From 1994 to 1998, she was as Ambassador to Luxembourg. From 1998 to 2003, she was Minister Counselor of the Embassy in France.

Preceded by Zhao Liang	Chinese Ambassador to Luxembourg; November 1994- February 1998	Succeeded by Ding Yuhua

== Publications ==
- "外交翻译60年 (Sixty years of diplomatic interpreting)", Chinese Translators Journal, 5 (2), 中国翻译 (Translators Association of China): 9–12, 2009
- 我的外交翻译生涯, 中国青年出版社, 2013, ISBN 9787515314617
- 在法国的外交生涯. 上海三聯書店. 2006. ISBN 9787542622891.

== Sources ==
- Li, Xiao (2014), 施燕华 Shi Yanhua, 中国翻译研究院 China Academy of Translation
