= Xiao Qian (diplomat) =

Chinese diplomat

- 肖千
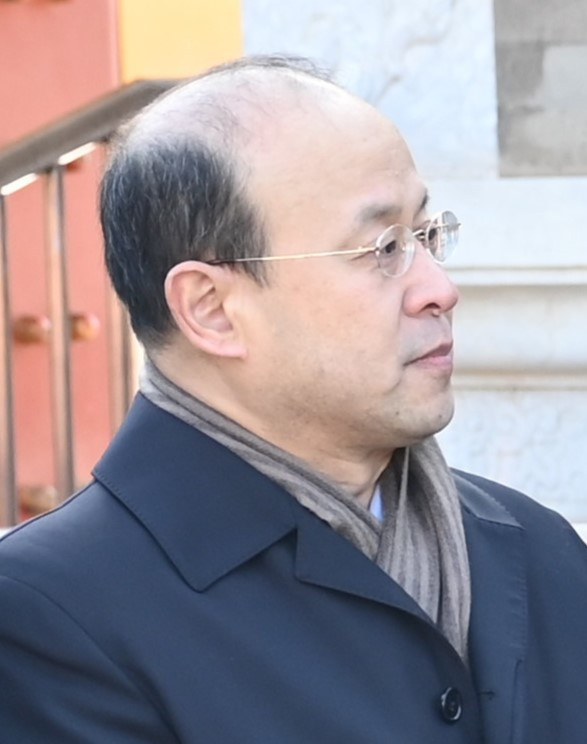
- Xiao in 2023

Chinese Ambassador to Australia
- In office 7 January 2022 – July 2026
- Appointed by: Xi Jinping
- Preceded by: Cheng Jingye
- Succeeded by: Liu Jinsong

Chinese Ambassador to Indonesia
- In office December 2017 – November 2021
- Appointed by: Xi Jinping
- Preceded by: Xie Feng
- Succeeded by: Lu Kang

Chinese Ambassador to Hungary
- In office November 2012 – June 2015
- Appointed by: Hu Jintao
- Preceded by: Gao Jian (diplomat)
- Succeeded by: Duan Jielong

Personal details
- Born: November 1964 (age 61–62) China
- Party: Chinese Communist Party
- Children: 1

Xiao Qian (Chinese: 肖千; pinyin: Xiāo Qián; born November 1964) is a Chinese diplomat. Previously he served as Chinese ambassador to Australia, Chinese ambassador to Indonesia and before that, Chinese ambassador to Hungary.

== Biography ==
Born in November 1964, Xiao joined the foreign service in 1986 and previously filled posts in Ethiopia, India, the United States, and the Philippines. In November 2012, he succeeded Gao Jian (diplomat) as Chinese ambassador to Hungary, serving in that position from 2012 to 2015. In 2015–17, he was director of the Asia Department of the Ministry of Foreign Affairs, in charge of Asia. He was designated by President Xi Jinping in December 2017 according to the decision of the National People's Congress, to replace Xie Feng as Chinese ambassador to Indonesia.

In January 2022, he was appointed Chinese ambassador to Australia, succeeding Cheng Jingye. In August 2026, Xiao Qian was removed from his position and was succeeded by Liu Jinsong.

== Political views ==
On 9 August 2022 during the National Press Club of Australia event, Ambassador Xiao Qian claimed that the Taiwanese people might need "re-educating" in the event of any reunification with Mainland China while responding to Australian reporters regarding similar comments from Chinese Ambassador to France.

== Personal life ==
Xiao is married and has a daughter.

== Honours and awards ==
- 2015 Hungarian Order of Merit

Diplomatic posts
Preceded by Gao Jian (diplomat)	Chinese Ambassador to Hungary; 2012–2015	Succeeded by Duan Jielong
Preceded by Xie Feng	Chinese Ambassador to Indonesia; 2017–2021	Succeeded by Lu Kang
Preceded by Cheng Jingye	Chinese Ambassador to Australia; 2022–2026	Succeeded by Liu Jinsong
Incumbent
Government offices
Preceded by Kong Xuanyou	Director of Department of Asian Affairs; 2015–2017	Succeeded by Wu Jianghao
