= Cong Peiwu =

Chinese diplomat

- 丛培武
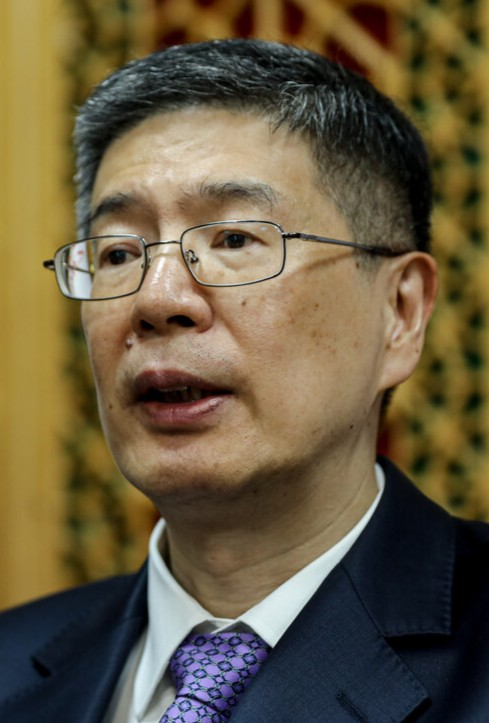
- Cong in 2024

Chinese Ambassador to Iran
- Incumbent
- Assumed office 14 May 2024
- Preceded by: Chang Hua

Chinese Ambassador to Canada
- In office September 2019 – April 2024
- Preceded by: Lu Shaye
- Succeeded by: Wang Di

Director of the North American and Oceanian Affairs Department of the Ministry of Foreign Affairs
- In office 2014–2019
- Minister: Wang Yi
- Preceded by: Xie Feng
- Succeeded by: Lu Kang

Personal details
- Born: May 1967 (age 59) China
- Party: Chinese Communist Party
- Children: 1
- Education: China Foreign Affairs University

Cong Peiwu (Chinese: 丛培武; pinyin: Cóng Péiwǔ; born May 1967) is a Chinese diplomat serving as Chinese Ambassador to Iran since 2024 and Chinese Ambassador to Canada between 2019 and 2024.

== Biography ==
Cong once served as counsellor of the Chinese Embassy in Britain. In 2014, he became head of the Department of North American and Oceanian Affairs of the Ministry of Foreign Affairs of the People's Republic of China, replacing Xie Feng. On September 5, 2019, Geng Shuang confirmed that Cong would serve as Chinese Ambassador to Canada.

== Career ==
=== Ambassador to Canada ===
On 15 October 2020, during an online press conference, Cong said "So if the Canadian side really cares about the stability and prosperity in Hong Kong, and really cares about the good health and safety of those 300,000 Canadian passport holders in Hong Kong, and the large number of Canadian companies operating in Hong Kong SAR, you should support those efforts to fight violent crimes." Asked if this was a threat to Canadians, he replied "That is your interpretation."

On 24 September 2021, Cong accompanied Huawei's deputy chairwoman and its chief financial officer, Meng Wanzhou to Vancouver International Airport to send her off aboard her repatriation flight back to Shenzhen, Guangdong, China, after over 1000 days under house arrest.

On 3 February 2023, Cong was summoned by officials of Global Affairs Canada amidst an incident of a balloon of Chinese origin crossing into Canadian and United States airspace eventually traversing the whole contiguous United States.

In April 2024, Cong left the position of Chinese ambassador to Canada after being reassigned to Iran.

=== Ambassador to Iran ===
In May 2024, Cong became the Chinese ambassador to Iran. He presented his credentials to Iranian foreign minister Hossein Amir-Abdollahian on May 15, four days before Abdollahian died in a helicopter crash.

Government offices
Preceded by Xie Feng (谢锋)	Head of the Department of North American and Oceanian Affairs of the Ministry of Foreign Affairs of the People's Republic of China; 2014–2019	Succeeded by Lu Kang
Diplomatic posts
Preceded by Lu Shaye	Chinese Ambassador to Canada; 2019–2024	Succeeded by Wang Di
