= Baren (writer) =

Chinese writer, critic and translator

Wang Renshu
- 王任叔

Chinese Ambassador to Indonesia
- In office August 1950 – November 1951
- Preceded by: New title
- Succeeded by: Zhong Qingfa (Chargé d'affaires)

Personal details
- Born: 19 October 1901 Fenghua, Zhejiang, Qing Empire
- Died: 25 July 1972 (aged 70) Beijing, China
- Party: Chinese Communist Party
- Education: Zhejiang Provincial 4th Normal School

Chinese name
- Chinese: 王任叔
Transcriptions
Standard Mandarin
- Hanyu Pinyin: Wáng Rènshū

Baren
- Chinese: 巴人
Transcriptions
Standard Mandarin
- Hanyu Pinyin: Bārén

Baren (Chinese: 巴人; pinyin: Bārén; 1901–1972) was a modern Chinese writer, critic and translator.

== Biography ==
Baren was born Wang Renshu (Chinese: 王任叔; pinyin: Wáng Rènshū) in Fenghua, Zhejiang. He went to elementary school when he was 8, and entered the Fourth Normal School of Zhejiang in 1915. After graduating in 1920, he became a grade school teacher. In 1923 he started to write short stories and poems, and joined the Literature Research Society. One year later, Baren became a member of the Chinese Communist Party. In 1930, he joined the League of the Left-Wing Writers. When the Second Sino-Japanese War broke out, Baren stayed in Shanghai to publicize anti-war culture. In 1942, he went to Indonesia, pursuing the anti-war movement. He returned to China in 1948.

After the founding of the People's Republic of China, he served as Chinese ambassador to Indonesia and the director of the People's Literature Publishing House. Baren was persecuted and put to death during the Cultural Revolution.

Baren preferred fiction writing. He created collections of short stories including Jail, Shack, In the Decline and Martyrdom, novellas such as Vagrant Life of Ah Quei and Badge, and the novel Rebellion of Mang Xiucai. His work on literary theory, On Literature, was heavily influenced by the ideals of anti-Soviet critics.

Diplomatic posts
New title	Chinese Ambassador to Indonesia; 1950–1951	Succeeded by Zhong Qingfa (Chargé d'affaires)
