= China–Indonesia relations =

- China: Indonesia

Diplomatic mission
- Embassy of China, Jakarta: Embassy of Indonesia, Beijing

The People's Republic of China (PRC) and Indonesia established diplomatic relations in 1950, and re-established relations in 1990 following a break in 1967. For many centuries, the two regions were largely tied together through informal trade. Under Sukarno’s presidency, relations with China deepened. In the early 1960s, Sukarno embarked on a series of foreign policies under a banner of anti-imperialism and a personal championing of the Non-Aligned Movement. These developments led to increasing friction with the West and closer relations both with the China and the Soviet Union. Sukarno's Guided Democracy relied on two conflicting pillars of support, the military and the Communist Party of Indonesia (PKI). He favored the latter, which grew to be the largest political party with 3 million members and in August 1965, Sukarno declared his intention to commit Indonesia to an anti-imperialist alliance with China and other communist regimes and warned the military not to interfere.

The military, nationalists, and Muslim groups objected to the prominence of the PKI, fearing the imminent establishment of a communist state in Indonesia and regarded Sukarno's close alliance with China as compromising Indonesia's sovereignty. This culminated in the progressive sidelining and eventual ousting of Sukarno from 1965 until 1967 by Suharto and his supporters, who instigated a prolonged persecution and eventual elimination of the PKI with estimates of killings varying from 500,000 to 1 million. In 1967, Suharto introduced orders banning Chinese literature, culture and characters, encouraging the abandonment of Chinese names and suspended diplomatic relationships with the PRC, to be restored only in 1990.

An important factor in relations is the small, only 3% of the population, but long-established and economically influential Chinese diaspora. This group has been keen to take advantage of trading opportunities with China, which has become Indonesia's biggest trading partner since the signing of the Indonesia-China Strategic Partnership in 2005. Trade flows increased steadily, turning in 2008 into a rising trade deficit for Indonesia. Two-way investment was boosted by President Joko Widodo and Chinese leader Xi Jinping’s close personal relationship, leading to a surge in investment under China's Belt and Road Initiative (BRI). Inbound investment from China, including Hong Kong, in 2019–2020, ranked second after Singapore. Both countries are among the largest nations in Asia in terms of both area and population. China is the second-most populous nation in the world, while Indonesia has the 4th largest population. China is Indonesia's largest trading partner. The annual trade between China and Indonesia was $135 billion as of 2024.

China has an embassy in Jakarta and consulates in Surabaya and Medan, while Indonesia has an embassy in Beijing and consulates in Guangzhou, Shanghai, and Hong Kong. Both nations are members of the APEC, BRICS and the G20.

== History ==
=== Kingdom era ===
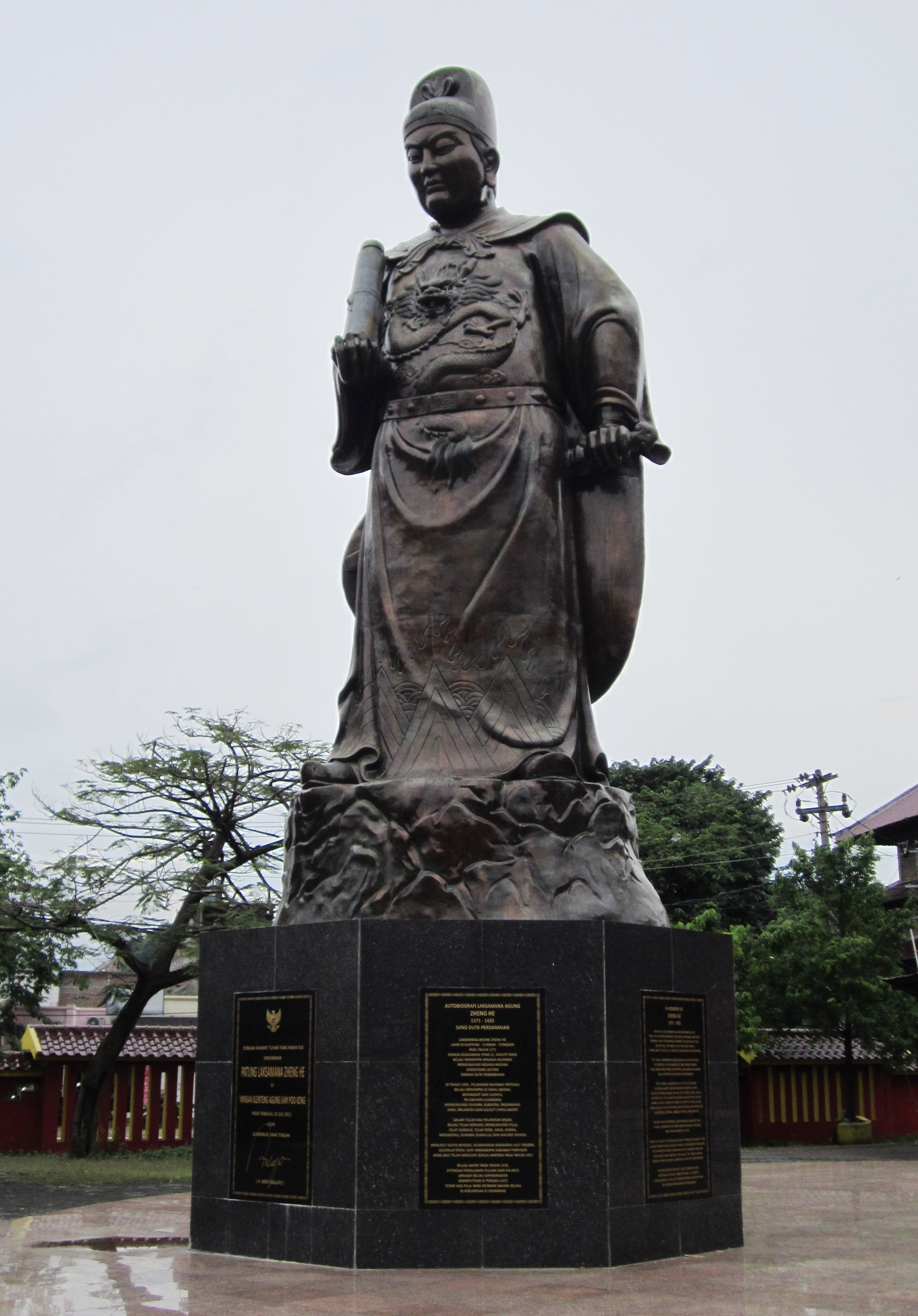
The Zheng He memorial statue in Sam Poo Kong temple, Semarang, commemorate the Ming naval voyage to Indonesian archipelago.

The relations between imperial China and ancient Indonesia commenced during the 7th century, possibly earlier. Indonesia was part of the maritime Silk Road connecting China with India and the Arab world. Numerous Chinese ceramics have been discovered throughout Indonesia, suggesting ancient trade links between the two regions. The National Museum of Indonesia has one of the most complete collections of Chinese ceramics discovered outside of China, dated from the Han, Tang, Song, Yuan, Ming and Qing dynasties, spanning for almost two millennia. This particular collection provides a good insight into Indonesia's maritime trade over the centuries. Research indicates that the Chinese sailed to India via Indonesia as early as Western Han period (205 BC to 220 AD) as a part of the maritime silk road and firm trade relations were subsequently established. Traditionally, the Indonesian archipelago, identified by ancient Chinese geographer as Nanyang, was the source of spices such as cloves, cubeb, and nutmeg, raw materials such as sandalwood, gold and tin, as well as exotic rare items such as ivory, rhino horn, tiger fur and bone, exotic birds and colorful feathers. While the fine silk and ceramics of China was sought by ancient Indonesian kingdoms. Indonesia also played some role in the expansion of Buddhism from India to China. A Chinese monk, I-Tsing, visited Srivijaya in 671 for 6 months during his mission to acquire sacred Buddhist texts from India. Other Chinese accounts and chronicles also mention several ancient states in Indonesia today. Chinese records mentioned about Kunlun sailors, presumably Cham or Malays sailors, that sailed and traded many products across ports in Southeast and South Asia. The Malay sailors are most probably hailed from Srivijayan empire in Sumatra. Ancient Indonesian sailors seem to actively sought trade around Southeast Asia and as far as China and India. Since I-Tsing, numbers of Chinese travelers such as Chou Ju-kua began to visit and wrote about the Indonesian archipelago.

Most ancient Chinese-Indonesia relations were trade-motivated and throughout their shared history, most were harmonious and peaceful, with one exception. In 1293, Kublai Khan of Yuan dynasty sent a massive expedition of 1,000 ships to Java to punish the defiant king Kertanegara of Singhasari. The naval expedition, however, was a failure as Java rose to be Majapahit empire instead. Maritime empires such as Srivijaya, Majapahit, and later Malacca sought trade permits to establish relations with lucrative Chinese markets. The numbers of Chinese immigrants and Chinese influences in the archipelago reached a new height, with the massive Ming dynasty naval expedition led by admiral Zheng He that visited Java, Sumatra, and the Malay peninsula in early the 15th century. Zheng He's translator Ma Huan wrote a detailed description of Majapahit and where the king of Java lived. The report was composed and collected in Yingya Shenglan, which provides a valuable insight on the culture, customs, also various social and economic aspects of Chao-Wa (Java) during Majapahit period. The Chinese naval expedition contributed to the establishment of overseas Chinese settlements in Indonesia, such as Semarang, Tuban and Rembang which have had significant Chinese populations since Majapahit era.

During the colonial Dutch East Indies Company and Dutch East Indies era, significant Chinese settlers began to fill labor needs and seek a new life in the Indonesian archipelago. Most of Chinese Indonesian immigrants came from the provinces of Southern China, such as Fujian and Guangdong. Significant Chinese settlements were established in West Kalimantan, the east coast of Sumatra, and the northern coast of Java. In 1932, China declared that its southernmost territory was the Paracels, not the seas surrounding the Natuna islands.

=== Post-Independence ===
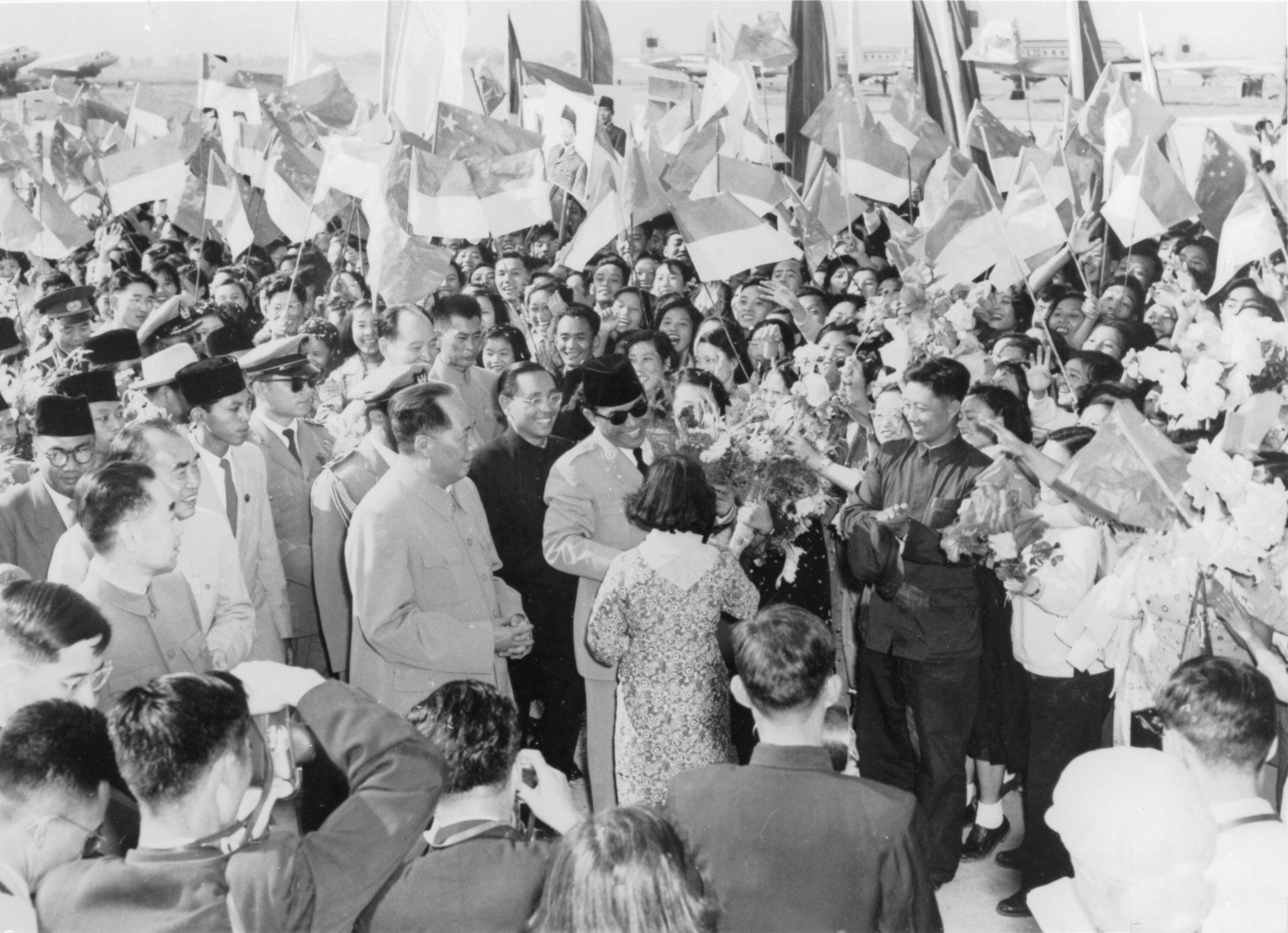
President Sukarno of Indonesia greeted at Beijing airport by Mao Zedong flocked by Indonesian-Chinese flags

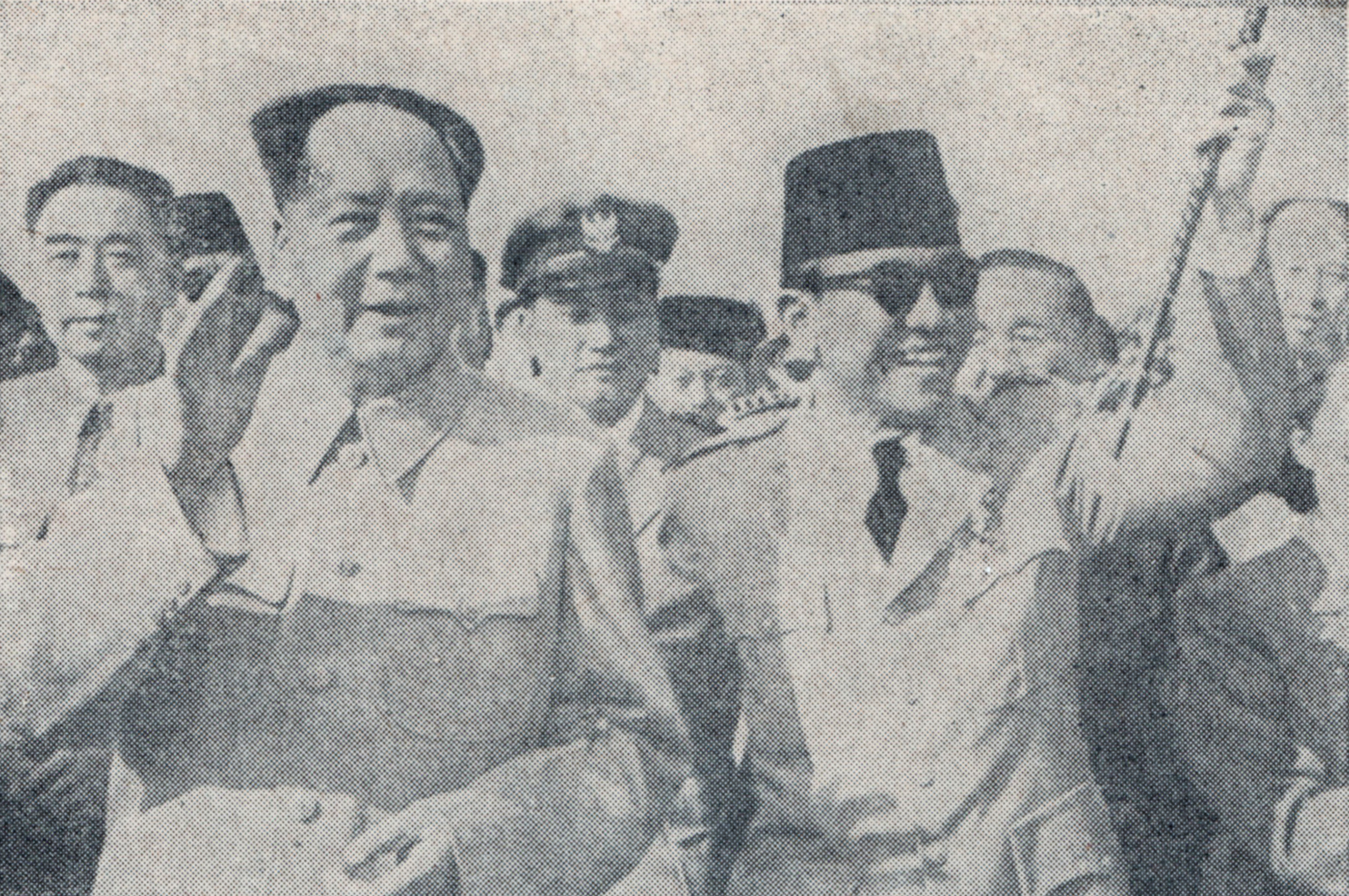
Mao Zedong and Sukarno

After Indonesia's independence in 1945 and the acknowledgement of its sovereignty from the Dutch in 1949, Indonesia established diplomatic relations with China (previously with Republic of China and later with People's Republic of China) in 1950. It was the first country in Southeast Asia to establish official diplomatic relations with the PRC. During the Sukarno administration, China and Indonesia enjoyed close relations.

In 1955, Indonesia and the PRC agreed to the Sino-Indonesian Dual Nationality Treaty, which required Chinese dual citizens to choose between Indonesian nationality and PRC nationality. If a Chinese did not elect between their former dual nationalities, the treaty deemed them to have repudiated their Indonesian nationality. This situation was complicated by the fact that many Chinese Indonesians held ROC passports and viewed themselves as ROC nationals. The ROC protested and in 1958 evacuated more than five thousand overseas Chinese to Taiwan. According to some estimates, by 1962 there were approximately 1 million ethnic Chinese in Indonesia without nationality.

In the 1950s to 1960s the Chinese Communist Party (CCP) had close relations with their Indonesian counterparts. Sukarno supported and won the bid for the 1962 Asian Games held in Jakarta. Political tensions arose when Indonesia refused entry to a delegation from Taiwan. After the International Olympic Committee imposed sanctions on Indonesia for this exclusionary policy, due to Indonesia's firm support for the One China policy. Sukarno retaliated by organizing a "non-imperialist" competitor event to the Olympic Games, called the Games of New Emerging Forces (GANEFO). Sukarno responded by accusing the IOC of being political in its refusal to accept the People's Republic of China; The IOC was merely an "imperialist and colonialist tool."

In January 1965, Sukarno, withdrew Indonesia from the United Nations after accusations that it was "dominated by imperialism." He attempted to establish a rival UN organization called the Conference of New Emerging Powers (CONEFO) with the support of the People's Republic of China, which was not yet a member of the UN, and he formed a new alliance of Indonesia with the new emergent forces (NEFO) countries with China, North Korea, North Vietnam, and Cambodia which he called the "Beijing-Pyongyang-Hanoi-Phnom Penh-Jakarta Axis." With the government heavily indebted to the Soviet Union, Indonesia became increasingly dependent on China for support. Sukarno increasingly spoke of the importance of the Beijing-Jakarta axis. However, after an unsuccessful coup attempt in 1965 resulted in the fall of Sukarno and the consolidation of power by right-wing military general Suharto, Indonesia severed diplomatic relations, maintaining that Communist China was partly responsible for the coup attempt. During the Indonesian mass killings of 1965–66, the Indonesian army and Chinese-hating guerillas massacred thousands of ethnic Chinese, contending that the Chinese were communists or loyal to the PRC.

=== Contemporary history ===
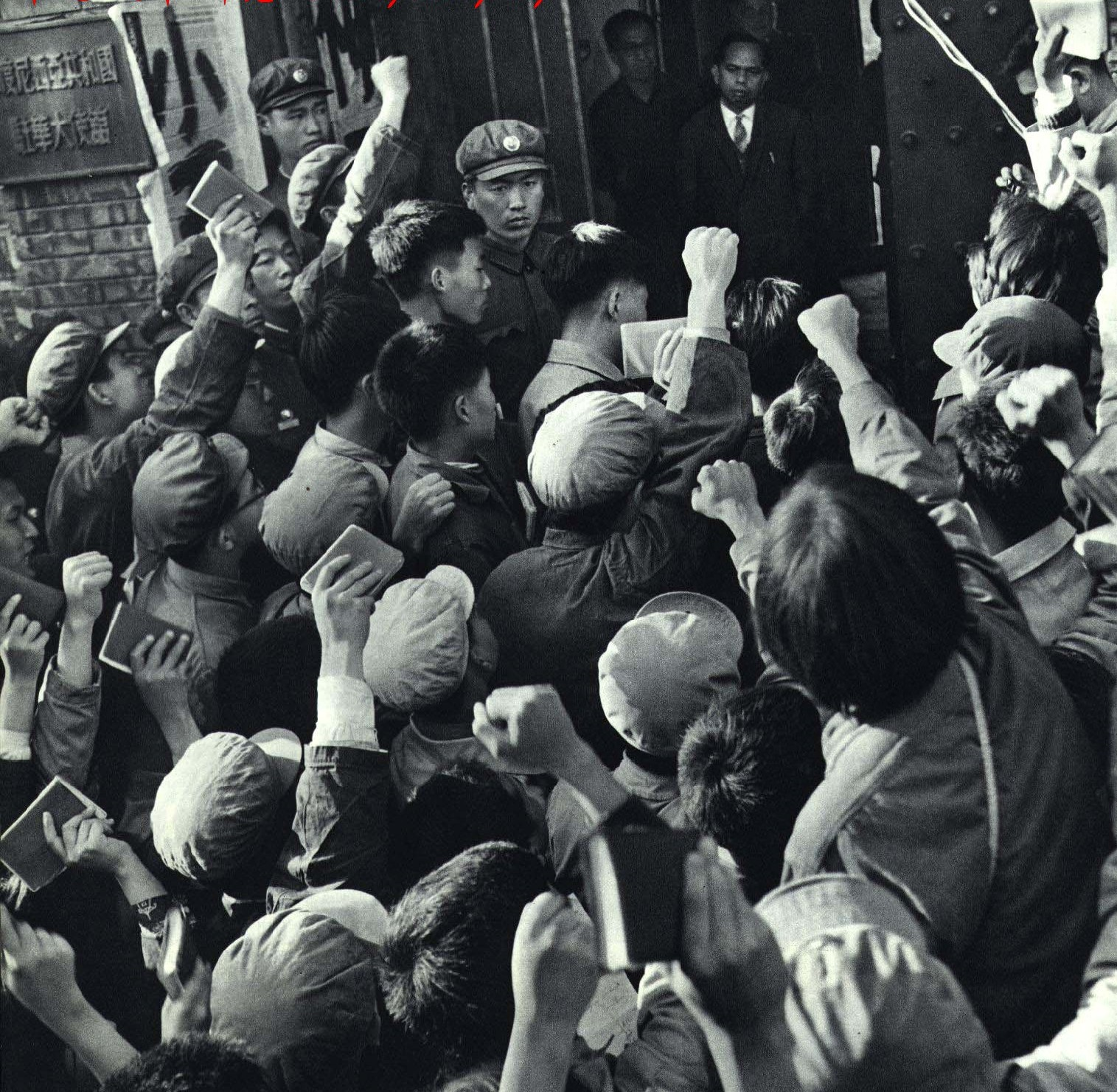
Protest at the Indonesian embassy in Beijing in April 1967 following Suharto's assumption of presidential power

China and Indonesia established diplomatic relations on April 13, 1950, which were suspended on October 30, 1967, due to the occurrence of the September 30 event of 1965, the subsequent 1967 seizure of power by Lt. General Suharto which appointed him to the office of acting president, the stepping down of President Sukarno and the eventual beginning of the New Order era, which, under Suharto's presidency, would last thirty-two years.

Entering the 1970s, relations between China and the West began to improve, especially after the visit of United States President Richard Nixon to Beijing after years of US diplomatic policy that favored the Republic of China in Taiwan. Previously, this policy was also followed by the acceptance of the People's Republic of China at the UN. The improving relations between the People's Republic of China and the West certainly influenced global politics at that time, especially Indonesia. In 1985, Indonesia held the 30th anniversary of the Asian-African Conference and invited representatives from countries that had attended the conference since 1955, including China. Chinese Foreign Minister Wu Xueqian was specially invited to attend the event and as a sign of the warming of relations between Beijing and Jakarta. China and Indonesia relations began to improve with the reopening of trade relations between the two countries in 1985.

Bilateral relations have improved since the 1980s. Foreign Minister Qian Qichen of China met with President Suharto and State Minister Moerdiono of Indonesia in 1989 to discuss the resumption of diplomatic relations of the two countries. In December 1989, the two sides held talks on the technical issues regarding the normalization of bilateral relations and signed the Minutes. Foreign Minister Ali Alatas of Indonesia visited China on invitation on 3 July 1990 and the two sides issued the "Communiqué on the Restoration of Diplomatic Relations between the Two Countries". Premier Li Peng visited Indonesia on invitation on August 6, 1990. In his talks with President Suharto, the two sides expressed their willingness to improve relations between the two countries on the basis of the Five Principles of Peaceful Co-Existence and the Ten Principles of the Bandung Conference. On 8 August, Foreign Ministers of China and Indonesia on behalf of their respective governments, signed the Memorandum of Understanding on the Resumption of Diplomatic Relations. The two sides declared the formal resumption of the diplomatic relations between China and Indonesia that day.

China's cautious response to the 1998 anti-Chinese riots caused an uproar among human rights groups. Following protests at the Indonesian embassy in Beijing in August, Foreign Minister Tang Jiaxuan made a direct appeal to the Indonesian government to ensure the protection of Chinese Indonesian communities.

In July 2012, Indonesia and China conducted a bilateral antiterrorism exercise. In September 2017, two giant pandas, Cai Tao and Hu Chun, arrived in Jakarta from Sichuan province to be placed in Taman Safari in Bogor as part of the 60th anniversary celebrations of China–Indonesia bilateral relations.

Indonesia joined the Belt and Road Initiative (BRI) in 2015.

== Sovereignty and human rights issues ==
Indonesia follows the one China principle, and recognizes government of the People's Republic of China as the sole legal government representing the whole of China and Taiwan as "an inalienable part" of China. Indonesia also supports all efforts by the PRC to "achieve national reunification", considers issues related to Xinjiang and Tibet as internal affairs of China and "firmly supports China’s efforts to maintain development and stability" in Xinjiang and Tibet.

In December 2018, the issue of China's human rights abuses against the Uyghur minority was brought up in parliament. Indonesian Vice President Jusuf Kalla said: "we don't want to intervene in the domestic affairs of another country." In November 2021, the Chinese embassy in Jakarta presented testimonies from Uyghur government and community representatives in Xinjiang as well as those from Nahdlatul Ulama to counter Western allegations of abuse. China has also granted scholarships for santri to study in the country, leading some of them to issue defenses of its Xinjiang policy in Indonesian media.

== Trade and investment ==
Countries which signed cooperation documents related to the Belt and Road Initiative

China and Indonesia are both parties to China-ASEAN free trade agreement and are both parties to the Regional Comprehensive Economic Partnership (RCEP). As of 2025, China and Indonesia do not have a bilateral free trade agreement.

Trade between China and Indonesia is on the rise, especially after the implementation of ACFTA since early 2010. Indeed, while in 2003 trade between Indonesia and China reached only US$3.8 billion, in 2010 it multiplied almost 10 times and reached US$36.1 billion. China's transformation into the fastest growing country in the 21st century has led to an increase of foreign investments in the bamboo network, a network of overseas Chinese businesses operating in the markets of Southeast Asia that share common family and cultural ties. China is Indonesia's largest trading partner. The annual trade between China and Indonesia was $135 billion as of 2024.

China has remained on top of Indonesia's key major trading partners, serving as the country's largest export and import market. China serves as Indonesia's largest export destination after overtaking Japan and United States, reaching US$16.8 billion. China is also Indonesia's most important source of imports, reaching US$30.8 billion, or 22.7% of Indonesian imports in 2016. The balance however was in favour of China as Indonesia booked a trade deficit of US$14 billion in 2016.

In Indonesia, Chinese companies invest in sectors including mining, hydropower, solar panel production, electric vehicle batteries, and industrial silicon. As of 2025, Chinese investment in Indonesia is predominantly mining-related. Illegal mining operations by the Chinese have contributed to pollution in Indonesia. A number of BRI agreements between the two countries encourage Chinese investment in Indonesia's mining and downstream industries with preferential financing for such ventures.

From China's perspective, since 2010 ASEAN as a whole has become its fourth-largest trading partner after the European Union, Japan and the United States. Among ASEAN member countries, Indonesia was China's fourth-largest trading partner, which, according to data as of May 2010 from the Ministry of Commerce of the People's Republic of China, amounted to US$12.4 billion, after Malaysia (US$22.2 billion), Singapore (US$17.9 billion) and Thailand (US$15.7 billion).

In April 2011, Indonesia and China signed a memorandum of understanding on the development of industrial technology and Chinese investment in related sectors in Indonesia.

Being the second-largest donor of foreign aid to Indonesia after Singapore, China has also financed and developed multiple infrastructure projects in the country to create more growth in its economy, particularly in the utility, transportation, industry and tourism, with surging inflows of aid in recent years.

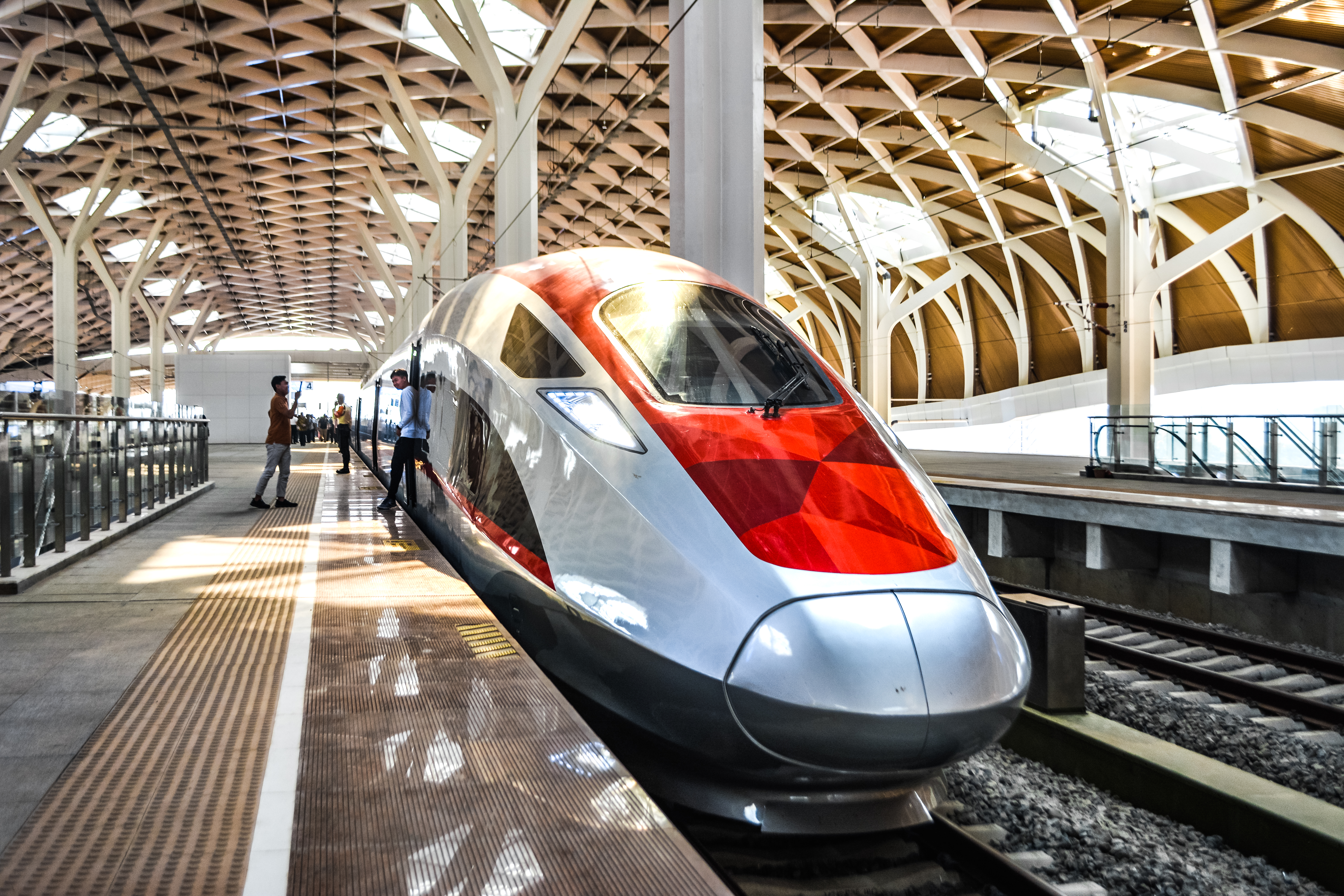
KCIC400AF in Halim station, East Jakarta. The Jakarta-Bandung HSR is the first Chinese overseas high-speed rail project as a prestigious example of Belt and Road Initiative

On late September 2015, Indonesia awarded a multibillion-dollar Jakarta-Bandung high-speed railway project to China. It was said that China's offer to build the Jakarta-Bandung line without requiring loan guarantee nor funding from Indonesia was the tipping point of Jakarta's decision. The Jakarta-Bandung high-speed rail was planned to begin its operations to public in 2019. However, the project was stalled for several years due to land acquisition problem and ensuing COVID-19 pandemic. Jakarta-Bandung High-speed rail officially opened its service on 2 October 2023.

In late 2021, the president of Indonesia Jokowi Widodo broke ground on a $132 billion U.S. "green" industrial estate to be constructed on Borneo with investments from China and the United Arab Emirates and electrified by a hydropower plant funded by China.

In 2024, Indonesia imposed tariffs of up to 200 percent on a range of Chinese goods. In 2024, The Financial Times reported that Indonesia is attempting to decrease Chinese investment in new nickel mining and processing projects. This strategy aims to help Indonesia's industry become eligible for tax incentives in the United States, aligning with the Biden administration's efforts to limit Beijing's impact on the electric vehicle supply chain. The Indonesian government and industry stakeholders are restructuring nickel investment deals to position Chinese companies as minority shareholders.

On May 25, 2025, Chinese Premier Li Qiang met with President Prabowo Subianto to discuss expanding trade relations amid a divisive global market and the mass installation of tariffs against foreign nations by the United States under President Donald Trump. The visit in Jakarta, which included 60 prominent Chinese businessmen, was noted by Premier Li as occurring in the same year as the 70th anniversary of the founding of the Non-Aligned Movement. At the talks, Premier Li encouraged Chinese investment in the Indonesian market.

== Culture ==
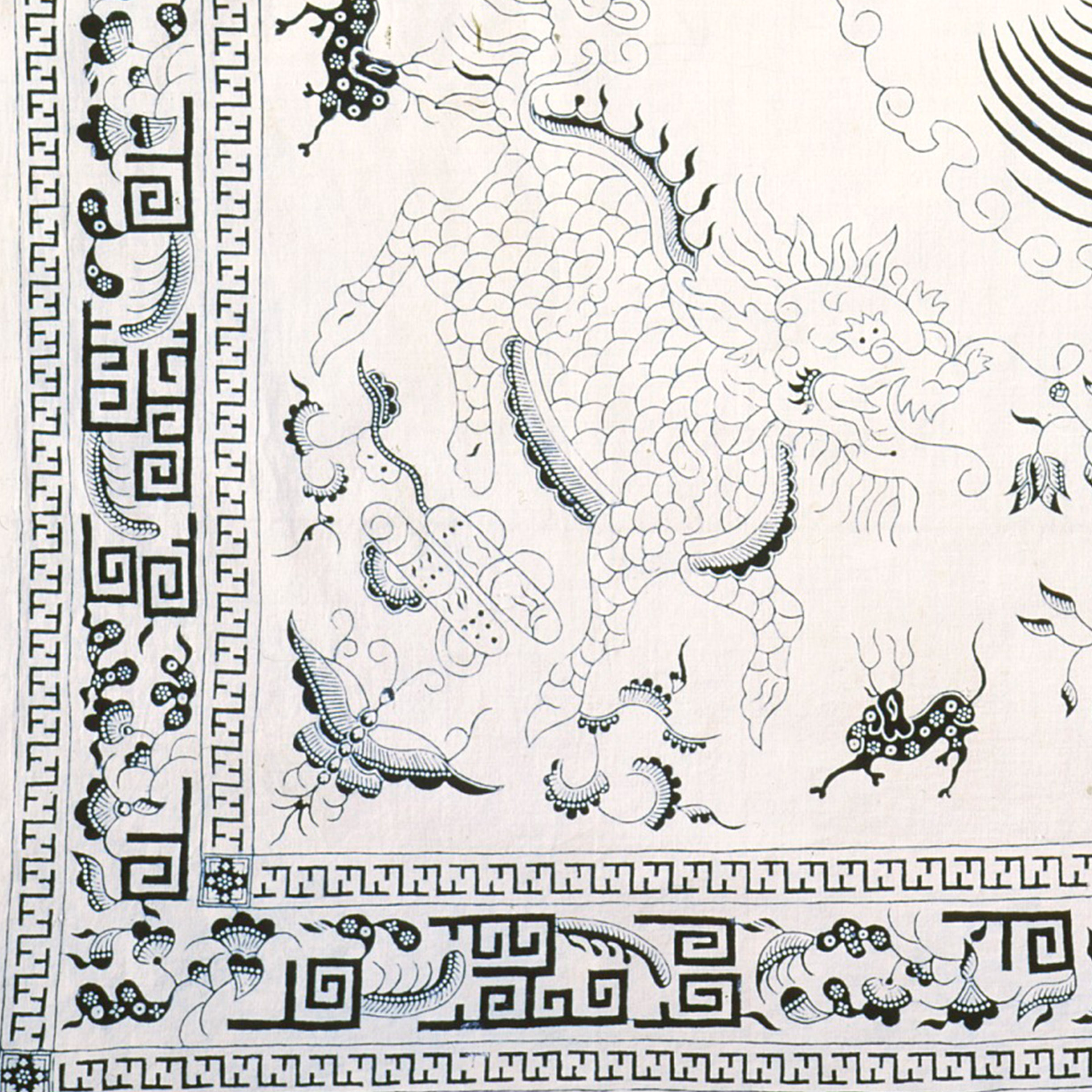
Batik Pesisiran with the image of qilin, demonstrate Chinese-influenced images, testify the centuries-old relations between China and Indonesia.

Since ancient times, Indonesian culture has absorbed many elements of Chinese culture, including Chinese loanwords that relate to a variety of topics, including cuisine, and art, seen through the Javanese Batik Pesisiran (coastal batik), which depicts Chinese images such as the cloud, phoenix, dragon, qilin, to peony flower.Chinese people began to settle in Indonesian coastal cities as early as Srivijaya (c. 7th century) and Majapahit (c. 14th century) period. And later accelerated during Dutch East Indies Company era (c. 17th century). Chinese immigrants brought with them Chinese culture of their homeland, intermarrying with local women and creating a hybrid peranakan culture, still observable today in some of Indonesian cities and in neighboring Malaysia and Singapore.Today, there are around 2,832,510 Chinese Indonesians, according to the 2010 census, forming 1.2% of the Indonesian population.

== State visits ==
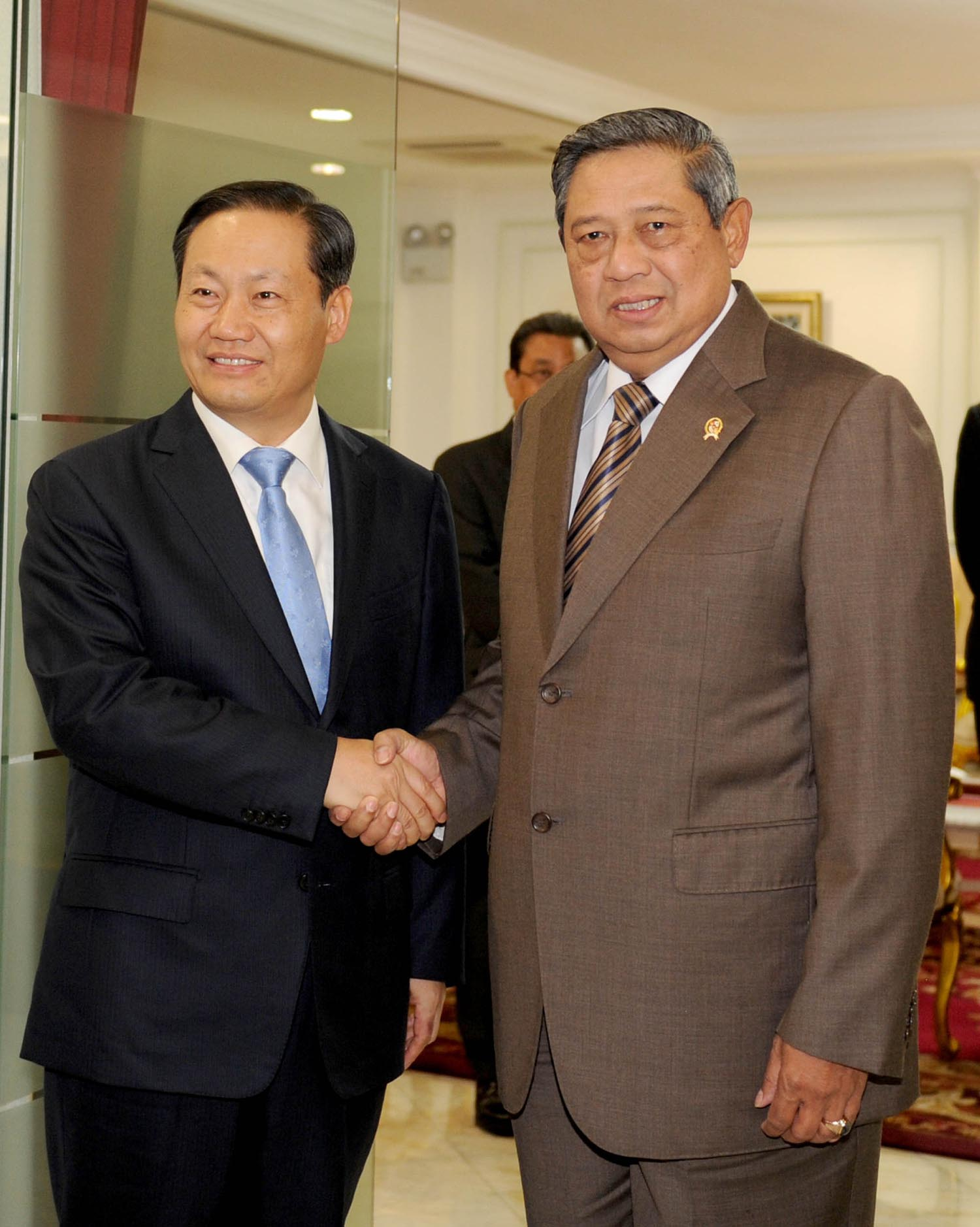
President Yudhoyono of Indonesia and Peng Qinghua, member of 18th Central Committee of the CCP, in Jakarta, June 17, 2013.

In 2013, CCP General Secretary Xi Jinping visited Indonesia and gave a speech to the Indonesian Parliament, announcing the signing of a comprehensive strategic partnership between the two countries and the establishment of the Asian Infrastructure Investment Bank. Xi also announced the Belt and Road Initiative's maritime element.

From November 8 to 11, 2014, newly elected Indonesian President Joko Widodo paid his first official overseas visit to China to attend the APEC summit in Beijing. He paid a bilateral meeting with Xi and Chinese premier Li Keqiang. Most recently in April 2015, Chinese leader Xi Jinping visited Bandung to commemorate the 60th anniversary of the Asian-African Conference, and Joko Widodo visited Beijing to attend the Belt and Road Forum from May 14 to 15, 2017.

== Tiongkok ==
Tiongkok (中国) is the Indonesian term for China, originating from the Min Nan (the local dialect of Southern Fujian) version of the word Zhongguo (中国), which is the term used to refer to China in Mandarin. The word—in its romanized form (Tiongkok)—was used in Indonesian by the Indonesian government to refer to China up until 1972, but its use ceased following a period of hostile relations in the 1960s. The authoritarian, anti-Chinese New Order government mandated the replacement of the term Tiongkok, as well as Tionghoa (中华), with "Cina". Many Chinese Indonesians felt that the term (in reference to them) was derogatory and racist, connoting "backwardness, humiliation, queues and bound feet". After the fall of President Suharto in 1998, the use of Tiongkok has seen a re-emergence.

On 14 March 2014, Indonesian President Susilo Bambang Yudhoyono signed Presidential Decree (Keputusan Presiden) No. 12/2014 to change the legal use of the Indonesian-language term to refer to China. Changes included replacing the term Cina or China to Tiongkok to refer to China as a country, and Tionghoa to refer to Chinese people, or Chinese descents. This change was meant to eradicate discrimination and prejudice towards Chinese Indonesians.

== South China Sea ==
Territorial claims in the South China Sea

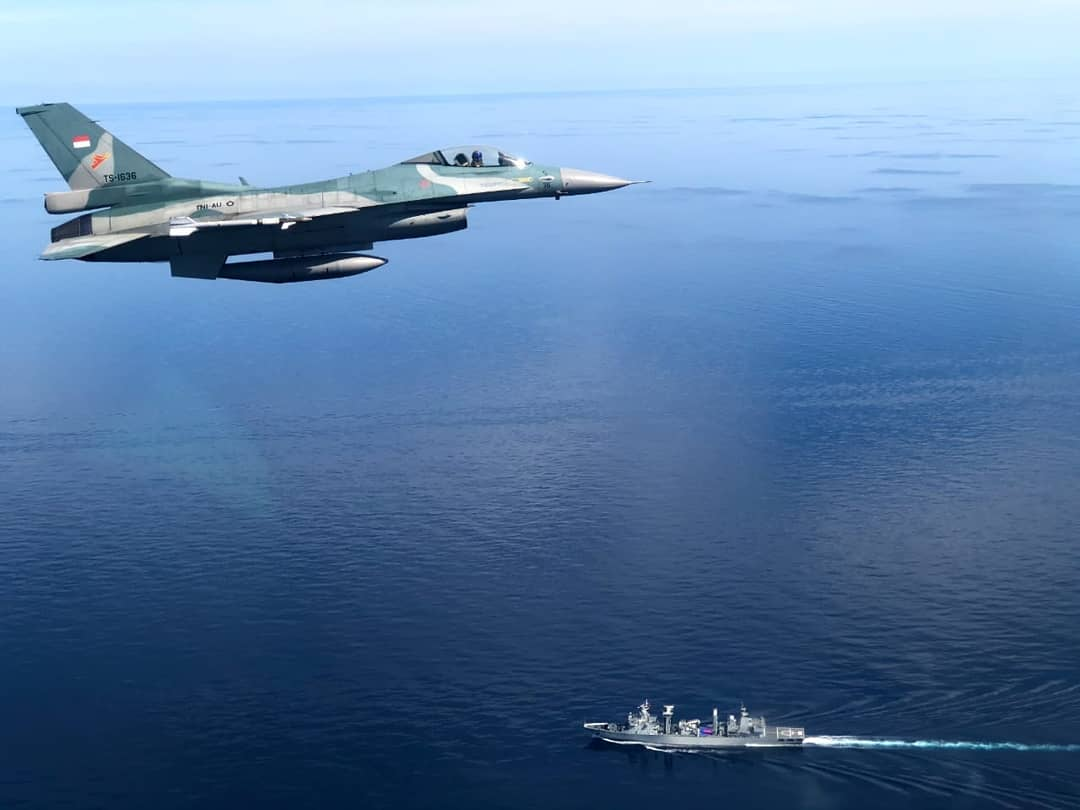
An Indonesian Air Force F-16 Fighting Falcon flying over what appeared to be a Chinese Navy Type 903 replenishment ship on the disputed region off the coast of Natuna, Riau Islands

Despite Indonesia's position as a non-claimant state in the South China Sea dispute, two countries were inevitably involved in this territorial dispute; as parts of China's unilaterally claimed nine-dash line is intersecting with Indonesia's exclusive economic zone near Natuna islands.

In 1932, China sent a Note Verbale to France, declaring that China's southernmost territory was the Paracels for the first time. In 1943, China again reiterated through its government-published book, China Handbook (1937–1943), that its southernmost territory was the Paracels, specifically Triton Island. In 1947, China revised its Handbook, stating that its southernmost territory was the Spratlys. In its revised 1947 Handbook and acknowledging that other states have claims to the Spratleys. During the same year, it began using a map with a dash-line to claim almost the entire sea, including the waters of the Natuna islands.

In March 2016, the two countries were involved in confrontation near Natuna Islands as Indonesian maritime authority that tried to capture a Chinese trawler accused for illegal fishing was prevented by Chinese coast guard. Indonesia insists to prosecute Chinese trawler crew, despite Beijing's demand to release them. An Indonesian official said that the "traditional fishing grounds" was not recognised under the UNCLOS. This incident prompted Indonesian military to increase its presence in Natuna area. On 23 June 2016, Indonesian President Joko Widodo visited Natuna islands on a warship, this was meant to send a "clear message" that Indonesia was "very serious in its effort to protect its sovereignty".

Following the Permanent Court of Arbitration ruling on 12 July 2016, Indonesia called on all parties involved in the territorial dispute to exercise self-restraint and to respect applicable international laws. The international ruling invalidated the dash-line utilized by China to claim the waters of the Natuna islands. Of the 556 vessels Indonesia had destroyed from October 2014 to 2019 for violating rules, 3 were from China while 9 other Chinese vessels escaped Indonesian custody. The amount of Chinese vessels destroyed was relatively small compared to vessels from countries like Vietnam (312), Philippines (91), and Malaysia (87).

In late 2019, China intensified its military activity in the waters of Indonesia's Natuna islands, which China claims as its territory. In January 2020, Chinese fishing boats, escorted by Chinese coast guard vessels, once again conducted fishing off the coast of northern islands of Natuna in waters claimed by Indonesia as its exclusive economic zone (EEZ). This led to a stand-off between the countries and Indonesia's decision to send its fishermen to join warships in the area to help defend against Chinese vessels. Indonesia had deployed two Kapitan Pattimura-class anti-submarine corvettes at Great Natuna Island in early January, and later added one Martadinata-class guided-missile frigate, two Bung Tomo-class corvettes, one Ahmed Yani-class frigate, one Makassar-class landing platform dock (LPD), one Cakra-class diesel submarine and four F-16C/D fighter jets to the deployment even when China vessels appeared to have backed down from the region. Indonesia responded by invoking the South China Sea Arbitration ruling.

In December 2021, China demanded Indonesia to stop its oil exploration activities in the waters of the Natuna islands, which China claims on the basis of the nine-dash line. China sent coast guard vessels to the area. Indonesia responded by deploying its navy to the area and completed its exploratory drilling. In October 2024, China sent its coast guard to an area where Indonesia was conducting exploratory drilling. Indonesia's navy deployed to protect the drilling, which was completed.

During a November 2024 state visit by Indonesian President Probowo Subianto to China, Indonesia and China signed a memorandum of understanding for "joint maritime development" in the area of the two countries "overlapping claims" near the Natuna Islands. Indonesia's Foreign Ministry subsequently issued a statement that the memorandum did not impact Indonesia's sovereignty or rights in the area and stating that in Indonesia's view the Chinese claims do not have a legal basis. Critics of the memorandum quoted by Voice of America and South China Morning Post contended that the wording could support China's position regarding the South China Sea claims.

== Espionage ==
In January 2021, Indonesian fishermen reported findings of underwater drones or gliders. This finding is thought to be related to a glider belonging to China that was previously found by fishermen around the waters of Selayar Island, South Sulawesi. Foreign media have highlighted these findings. Most of them call this incident a secret Chinese mission in Indonesian waters. The Guardian, in its Espionage rubric, details previously that a Chinese-made glider was also found by fishermen in Tanjung Pinang, Riau Islands in March 2019. Furthermore, the finding also occurred in Masalembo, East Java in January 2020.

== Public opinion ==
According to a 2014 BBC World Service Poll, 52% of Indonesians expressed a mainly positive view of China compared to 28% expressing a mainly negative view. A Pew Research Center poll in 2019 found that 36% of Indonesians expressed a favourable view of China while 36% expressed an unfavourable view. According to a December 2021 survey from the Australian Lowy Institute think tank, Indonesians were becoming increasingly wary of China and Chinese investments, with six in 10 of the 3,000 respondents agreeing that Jakarta should join with other nations to limit Beijing's rise. Only 43% of Indonesians polled said they felt China’s growth was good for Indonesia – down from 54% in 2011. According to a Morning Consult poll conducted in July 2022, 46% of Indonesians viewed China favourably while 18% viewed the country unfavourably. A survey published in 2026 by the Pew Research Center found that 72% of Indonesians had a favorable view of China, while 28% had an unfavorable view. It also found that 76% of Indonesians in the 18-35 age group had positive opinions of China.

== See also ==
- Chinese Indonesian (Tionghoa)
  - Chinese Indonesian surname
  - Legislation on Chinese Indonesians
- Foreign relations of the People's Republic of China
- Foreign relations of Indonesia
- Bamboo network
- Anti-Chinese sentiment in Indonesia

== Bibliography ==
- Mozingo, David (1976), Chinese Policy toward Indonesia, 1949–1967, Ithaca, N.Y.: Cornell University Press, ISBN 978-0-8014-0921-9.
- Purdey, Jemma (2006). Anti-Chinese violence in Indonesia, 1996-1999. Honolulu: University of Hawai'i Press. ISBN 978-0-8248-3057-1.
- Sukma, Rizal (1999), Indonesia and China: The Politics of a Troubled Relationship, London: Routledge, ISBN 978-0-415-20552-8.
- Zhou, Taomo. (2013), "Ambivalent Alliance: Chinese Policy towards Indonesia, 1960-1965," Cold War International History Project Working Paper No. 67.
- Zhou, Taomo. (2019) Migration in the Time of Revolution: China, Indonesia, and the Cold War (Cornell University Press, 2019) Online review
