= Xie Feng (diplomat) =

Chinese diplomat

- 谢锋
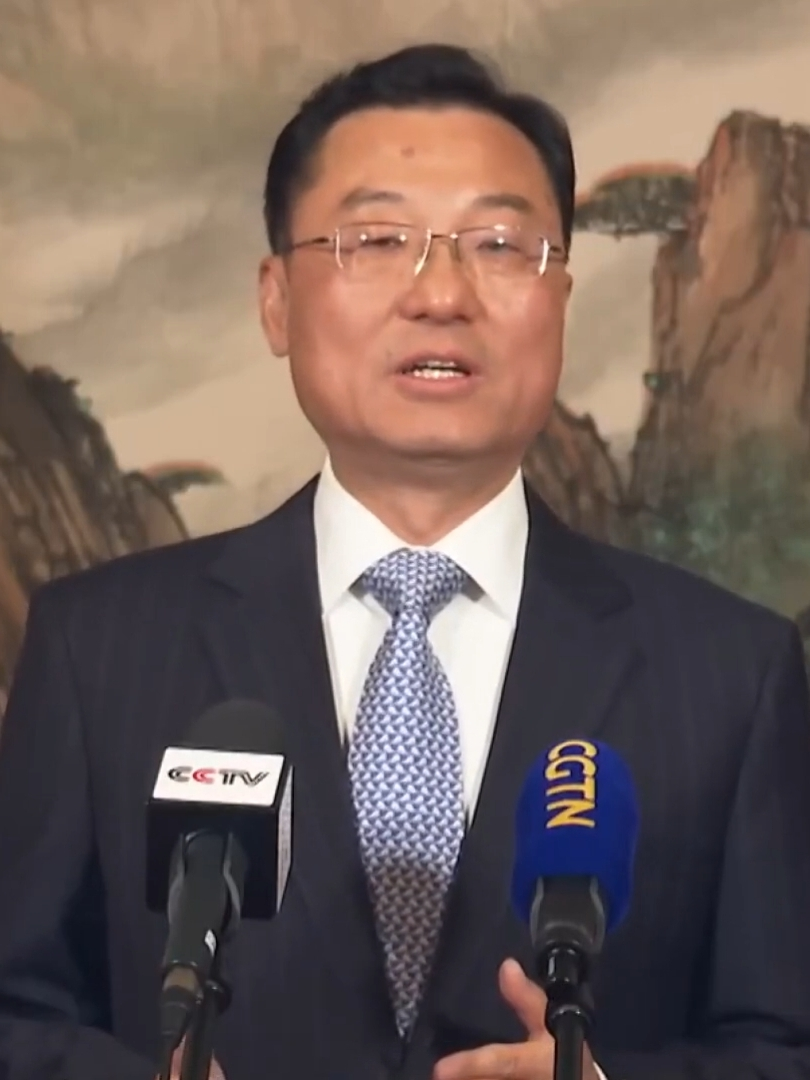
- Xie in 2023

Chinese Ambassador to the United States
- Incumbent
- Assumed office 23 May 2023
- Preceded by: Qin Gang

Vice Minister of Foreign Affairs
- In office 13 January 2021 – 24 May 2023 Serving with Ma Zhaoxu, Sun Weidong, Deng Li
- Minister: Wang Yi; Qin Gang

Commissioner of Office of Ministry of Foreign Affairs in Hong Kong
- In office June 2017 – January 2021
- Minister: Wang Yi
- Preceded by: Song Zhe
- Succeeded by: Liu Guangyuan

Chinese Ambassador to Indonesia
- In office February 2014 – June 2017
- Preceded by: Liu Jianchao
- Succeeded by: Xiao Qian

Personal details
- Born: April 1964 (age 62) Jiangdu County, Jiangsu, China
- Party: Chinese Communist Party
- Children: 1
- Education: China Foreign Affairs University (LLB); Renmin University (MPA)

Chinese name
- Simplified Chinese: 谢锋
- Traditional Chinese: 謝鋒
Transcriptions
Standard Mandarin
- Hanyu Pinyin: Xiè Fēng

Xie Feng (Chinese: 谢锋, born April 1964) is a Chinese diplomat who has been serving as the 12th Ambassador of China to the United States since May 2023. He previously served as Vice Minister of Foreign Affairs from 2021 to 2023, as Commissioner to Hong Kong from 2017 to 2021, and as Ambassador of China to Indonesia from 2014 to 2017.

== Early life and education ==
Xie was born in Jiangdu, Yangzhou, Jiangsu, China, in 1964. He enrolled at China Foreign Affairs University in 1981 and graduated with a Bachelor of Laws in 1986. He earned a Master of Public Administration from the Renmin University of China in 2008.

== Career ==
Xie joined the Ministry of Foreign Affairs in 1986. His first prominent position was Director of the Department of North American and Oceanian Affairs for the Ministry of Foreign Affairs from 2010 to 2014. He served as Ambassador of China to Indonesia from 2014 to 2017 and as commissioner of the Ministry of Foreign Affairs to Hong Kong from 2017 to 2021.

In 2021, he was appointed Vice Minister of Foreign Affairs of China, where he was responsible for specifically managing China's relationship with the United States. He served as a member of the 14th National Committee of the Chinese People's Political Consultative Conference on 17 January 2023 from the Friendship with Foreign Countries Sector. He was removed from the office of vice minister of foreign affairs on 24 May 2023.

On 23 May 2023, he was appointed Ambassador of China to the United States. On 1 July 2023, Xie presented his credentials to United States president Joe Biden.

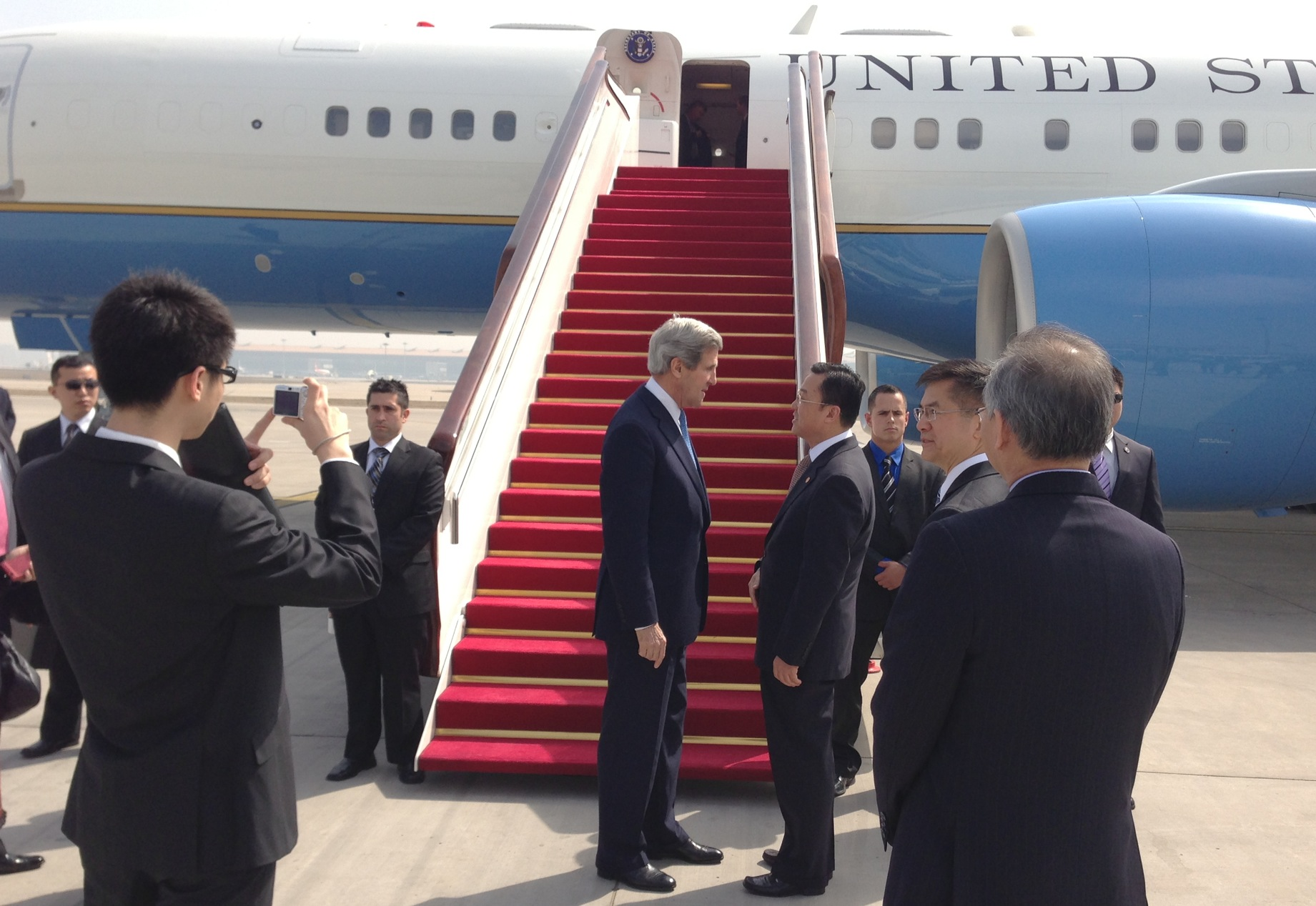
Xie Feng greets U.S. Secretary of State John Kerry upon his arrival in Beijing, on 13 April 2013. Xie was acting as China's Director General of the Ministry of Foreign Affairs for North America at the time.

On 20 April 2024, while speaking at the China Conference in Harvard Kennedy School, Xie's speech was disrupted by students belonging to organizations Students for a Free Tibet and Coalition of Students Resisting the CCP who shouted slogans condemning human rights violations in Tibet, Xinjiang and Hong Kong, and Chinese aggression against Taiwan.

== Personal life ==
Xie is married and has a son.

Diplomatic posts
Preceded by Qin Gang	Ambassador of China to the United States; 2023–present	Incumbent
Preceded by Liu Jianchao	Chinese Ambassador to Indonesia; 2014–2017	Succeeded by Xiao Qian
Government offices
Preceded by Song Zhe	Commissioner of Office of China's Foreign Ministry in the Hong Kong S.A.R. 2017–2021	Succeeded by Liu Guangyuan
Preceded by Zheng Zeguang	Vice Foreign Minister; 2021–2013	Succeeded by TBA
