= Lu Kang (diplomat) =

Chinese diplomat

- 陆慷
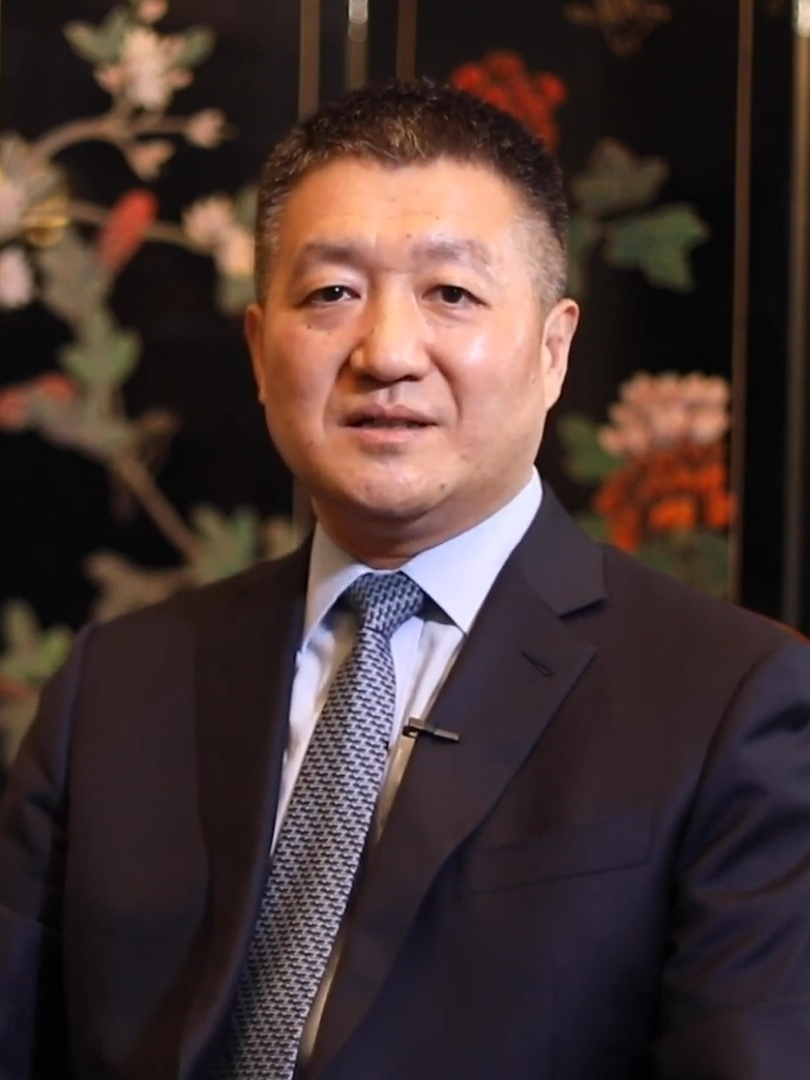
- Lu Kang in 2023

Deputy Head of the International Department of the Chinese Communist Party
- Incumbent
- Assumed office March 2024

Chinese Ambassador to Indonesia
- In office 22 February 2022 – 18 May 2024
- Minister: Wang Yi → Qin Gang → Wang Yi
- Preceded by: Xiao Qian
- Succeeded by: Wang Lutong

Director of the Foreign Ministry North American and Oceanian Affairs Department of the People's Republic of China
- In office 18 July 2019 – December 2021
- Preceded by: Cong Peiwu
- Succeeded by: Yang Tao

Director of Foreign Ministry Information Department of the People's Republic of China
- In office 16 April 2015 – 18 July 2019
- Preceded by: Liu Jianchao
- Succeeded by: Hua Chunying

Personal details
- Born: 14 May 1968 (age 58) Nanjing, Jiangsu, China
- Party: Chinese Communist Party
- Occupation: Politician, diplomat

Chinese name
- Simplified Chinese: 陆慷
- Traditional Chinese: 陸慷
Transcriptions
Standard Mandarin
- Hanyu Pinyin: Lù Kāng

Lu Kang (Chinese: 陆慷; born 14 May 1968) is a Chinese diplomat currently serving as deputy minister of the International Department of the Chinese Communist Party since May 2024. He previously served as the director of the Department of North American and Oceanian Affairs of the Ministry of Foreign Affairs of the People's Republic of China. His most recent diplomatic post was as the Chinese ambassador to Indonesia, where he served from 2022 to 2024.

== Life ==
Lu was born in Nanjing, Jiangsu, on May 14, 1968.

In 1993, Lu joined the Foreign Service and from 1993 to 1996 Lu served as a consultant and attaché for the Department of International Organizations and Conferences of the Ministry of Foreign Affairs. From 1996 to 1999 he was assigned to the mission at the UN headquarters in New York City. Subsequently, from 1999 to 2000 he was secretary of the Third Class in the Department of International Organizations and Conferences.

From 2000 to 2001 he attended the National University of Singapore, from which he graduated with a master's in public policy. As of 2001, he served as second-level legation secretary, deputy head of department, department head of the arms control and disarmament department, and served until 2006. From 2006 he was then counselor in Dublin, Ireland, until 2008.

From 2008 to 2010, he served as a legation counselor, deputy director-general of the Department of International Organizations and Conferences, and led the Chinese delegation to sessions of the Asia-Pacific Economic Community. As of 2010, he was deputy general director of the Department of North American and Oceanic Affairs. From 2012 to 2015, he served as minister in Washington, D.C. Since 2015, he has been director-general of the Information Division, a post which includes the function of speaker of the Ministry of Foreign Affairs of the People's Republic of China.

On March 14, 2016, he spoke about the 2001 Sino-Russian Treaty of Friendship as well as Foreign Minister Wang Yi's visit to Russia. Lu also spoke about Eurasian Economic Union, the alignment of the Silk Road Economic Belt and missile tests on Korean Peninsula, as well as resumption of six-party talks regarding those tests. Lu was very critical of the THAAD defense system that was introduced to South Korea by the United States to defend it against possible nuclear attack from DPRK, citing a "direct harm [of] the strategic security interests [for] China and Russia".

Regarding Syrian Civil War, Lu commented that he supports Geneva peace talks and blasted China-India Line of Actual Control crossing as media hype.

In 2017, he stated that the Sino-British Joint Declaration "no longer had any practical significance" with regards to the governance of Hong Kong, a view that was disputed by the British Foreign Office. After several days, China's Ministry of Foreign Affairs stated that the declaration was still binding and that Lu had been misinterpreted.

On July 18, 2019, he was appointed director of the Foreign Ministry North American and Oceanian Affairs Department of the People's Republic of China. He says China has freedom of religion.

On February 22, 2022, he became the Chinese Ambassador to Indonesia. In May 2024, he was recalled back to China, ending his tenure as ambassador.

On 19 May 2024, he was appointed a deputy minister of the International Department of the Chinese Communist Party.

Government offices
Preceded by Liu Jianchao	Director of Foreign Ministry Information Department of the People's Republic of China; 2015–2019	Succeeded by Hua Chunying
Preceded by Cong Peiwu	Director of the Foreign Ministry North American and Oceanian Affairs Department of the People's Republic of China; 2019–2021	Succeeded by Yang Tao
Diplomatic posts
Preceded by Xiao Qian	Chinese Ambassador to Indonesia; 2022–2024	Succeeded by Wang Lutong
