= Wu Jianmin =

Chinese diplomat

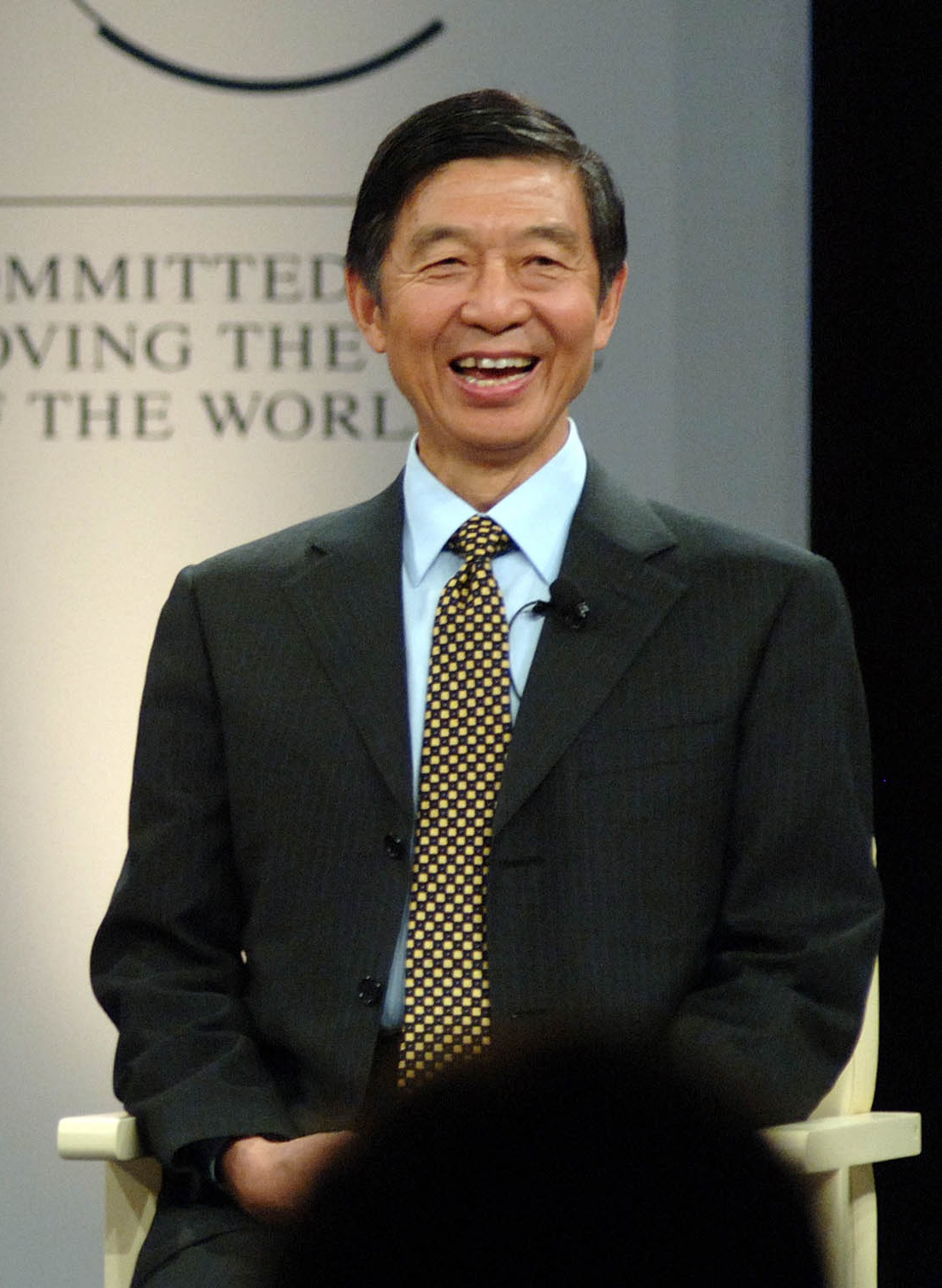

Personal details
- Born: March 30, 1939 Chongqing, China
- Died: June 18, 2016 (aged 77) Wuhan, China
- Spouse: Shi Yanhua

Wu Jianmin (Chinese: 吴建民; March 30, 1939 – June 18, 2016) was a prominent Chinese diplomat. He worked as the spokesman of Chinese Foreign Ministry, ambassador of China to the Netherlands, Permanent Mission to the United Nations Office at Geneva and other International Organizations in Switzerland, and France, and the president of the Bureau International des Expositions.

Wu was born in Chongqing, where his parents, natives of Nanjing, found refuge amidst the Second Sino-Japanese War. When Wu was seven years old, his family returned to Nanjing. He attended Nanjing No.2 Middle School and went on to the Beijing Foreign Languages Institute (now Beijing Foreign Studies University) where he graduated in 1959, majoring in French. Upon graduation, he was chosen to work for the Chinese Foreign Ministry, where he served as an interpreter for Chinese leaders including Mao Zedong, Zhou Enlai and Chen Yi.

Wu had a distinguished career as a diplomat. He worked at the Chinese mission to the United Nations in New York in the 1970s. He became the spokesman of Chinese Foreign Ministry in 1991. From 1994 to 2003, he worked as ambassador of China to the Netherlands, the UN organizations in Geneva and France. Afterwards, he worked as the president of China Foreign Affairs University. In 2003 he was elected as the president of the Bureau International des Expositions, and he was the first Chinese and Asian as well as the first person from a developing country to serve in the post, in which he served two two-year terms. Wu was a member of the Berggruen Institute's 21st Century Council.

On June 18, 2016, Wu died when the car in which he was traveling struck a median while exiting the Donghu Lake Tunnel in Wuhan, China. Wu was on his way to lecture at Wuhan University. He was 77.

His wife, Shi Yanhua, was also a professional diplomat who served as the English interpreter for Deng Xiaoping and was ambassador of China to Luxembourg.
