= List of ambassadors of China to Greece =

The ambassador of China to Greece is the official representative of the People's Republic of China to Greece.

== List of representatives ==
=== Republic of China ===
Name (English)	Name (Chinese)	Tenure begins	Tenure ends	Note
Wen Yuan-ning	温源宁	25 June 1947	30 July 1968	
Han Lih-wu	杭立武	30 July 1968	16 July 1972	

=== People's Republic of China ===
Name (English)	Name (Chinese)	Tenure begins	Tenure ends	Note
Shen Zhiwei	申志伟	November 1972	March 1973	
Zhou Boping	周伯萍	March 1973	9 June 1975	
He Yang	何扬	September 1975	June 1980	
Yang Gongsu	杨公素	September 1980	10 August 1982	
Zhuang Yan	庄焰	May 1983	May 1985	
Chang Hongsheng	唱鸿声	August 1985	June 1988	
Zhu Youwan	祝幼琬	August 1988	August 1992	
Wu Jiagan	吴家淦	September 1992	February 1996	
Yang Guangsheng	杨广胜	April 1996	February 2000	
Zhen Jianguo	甄建国	February 2000	July 2002	
Tang Zhenqi	唐振琪	July 2002	December 2004	
Tian Xuejun	田学军	December 2004	October 2007	
Luo Linquan	罗林泉	November 2007	20 July 2011	
Du Qiwen	杜起文	August 2011	January 2014	
Zou Xiaoli	邹肖力	January 2014	20 June 2018	
Zhang Qiyue	章启月	August 2018	April 2021	
Xiao Junzheng	肖军正	September 2021		

== See also ==
- China–Greece relations
