= Wang Di (diplomat) =

Chinese diplomat

- 王镝
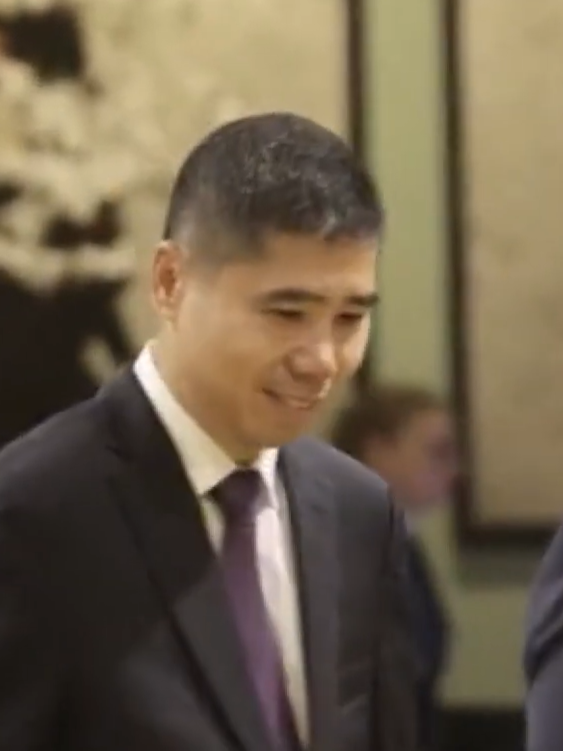
- Wang in 2024

Chinese Ambassador to Canada
- Incumbent
- Assumed office 5 July 2024
- Preceded by: Cong Peiwu

Chinese Ambassador to Kuwait
- In office May 2015 – Oct 2018
- Preceded by: Cui Jianchun
- Succeeded by: Li Mingang

Director of the Department of West Asian and North African Affairs
- In office 2019–2024
- Preceded by: Deng Li
- Succeeded by: Chen Weiqing

Personal details
- Born: June 1968 (age 57) China
- Party: Chinese Communist Party

Wang Di (simplified Chinese: 王镝; traditional Chinese: 王鏑; pinyin: Wáng Dí; born June 1968) is a Chinese diplomat and the current Chinese Ambassador to Canada since 2024. He previously served as deputy director of the Department of West Asian and North African Affairs of the Ministry of Foreign Affairs of the People's Republic of China, later serving as the department's director until May 2024, and the Chinese Ambassador to Kuwait.

As director of the MFA’s Department of West Asian and North African Affairs, he had been involved in discussions regarding Houthis attacks alongside diplomats from Saudi Arabia, Yemen and Oman. Upon becoming Chinese ambassador to Canada, Wang dismissed allegations of China's interference on Canadian elections and warned of retaliation if Canada plans to impose tariffs on Chinese electronic vehicle (EV) exports.

Diplomatic posts
Preceded by Cui Jianchun (崔建春)	Chinese Ambassador to Kuwait; 2015–2018	Succeeded by Li Mingang (李名刚)
