= List of ambassadors of China to Canada =

Ambassador of People's Republic of China to Canada
- 中国驻加拿大大使
- National emblem of China

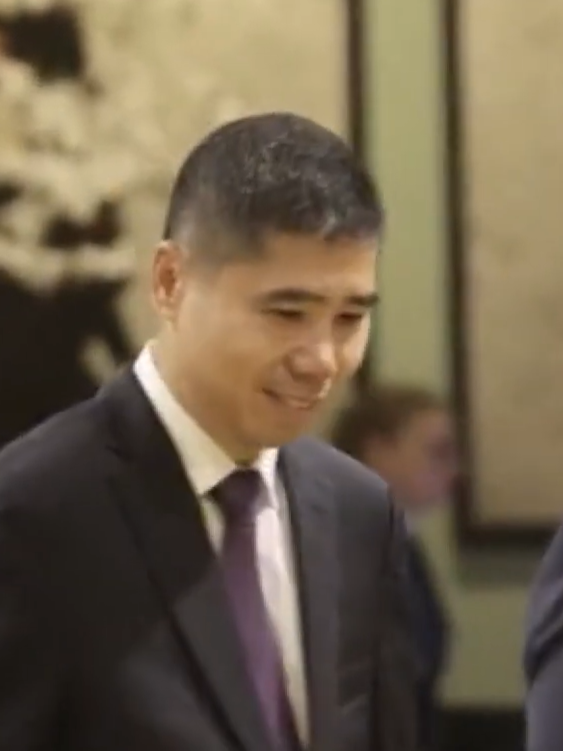
- Incumbent; Wang Di since July 2024
- Appointer: The president pursuant to a National People's Congress Standing Committee decision
- Inaugural holder: Xu Zhongfu
- Formation: February 1971; 55 years ago
- Website: Chinese Embassy – Ottawa

The ambassador of China to Canada is the official representative of the People's Republic of China to Canada.

== List of representatives ==
Name (English)	Name (Chinese)	Tenure begins	Tenure ends	Note
Xu Zhongfu	徐中夫	February 1971	July 1971	
Huang Hua	黄华	July 1971	November 1971	
Yao Guang	姚广	March 1972	September 1973	
Zhang Wenjin	章文晋	September 1973	December 1976	
Wang Dong	王栋	July 1977	February 1983	
Yu Zhan	余湛	September 1983	October 1986	
Zhang Wenpu	张文朴	December 1986	July 1990	
Wen Yezhan	温业湛	September 1990	November 1992	
Zhang Yijun	张毅君	December 1992	February 1997	
Zha Peixin	查培新	February 1997	June 1998	
Mei Ping	梅平	August 1998	March 2005	
Lu Shumin	卢树民	March 2005	May 2008	
Lan Lijun	兰立俊	June 2008	November 2010	
Zhang Junsai	章均赛	November 2010	April 2014	
Luo Zhaohui	罗照辉	May 2014	September 2016	
Lu Shaye	卢沙野	February 2017	June 2019	
Cong Peiwu	丛培武	September 2019	April 2024	
Wang Di	王镝	July 2024		

== See also ==
- China–Canada relations
