= Zhang Shu =

Chinese diplomat (1925-1998)

Zhang Shu (Chinese: 章曙) (1925–1998) was a Chinese diplomat. He was born in Beijing with his ancestral home in Liaocheng, Shandong. He was Ambassador of the People's Republic of China to Belgium (1983–1985) and Japan (1985–1988). He was President of China Foreign Affairs University.

Diplomatic posts
Preceded by Zheng Weizhi	Ambassador of China to Belgium with concurrent accreditation in Luxembourg; 1983–1985	Succeeded by Liu Shan
Preceded by Song Zhiguang	Ambassador of China to Japan; 1985–1988	Succeeded by Yang Zhenya
Academic offices
Preceded by Zhou Nan	President of China Foreign Affairs University; 1988–1992	Succeeded by Liu Shan
