= List of ambassadors of China to Sweden =

Ambassador of China to Sweden
- Incumbent; Vacant since September 2021
- Inaugural holder: Yan Huiqing
- Formation: 13 April 1916; 110 years ago
- Website: http://se.china-embassy.org/

The ambassador of China to Sweden is the official representative of the People's Republic of China to the Kingdom of Sweden.

== List of representatives ==
Diplomatic agrément/Diplomatic accreditation	Ambassador	Chinese language zh:中国驻瑞典大使列表	Observations	Premier of China	List of prime ministers of Sweden	Term end
October 6, 1913			The governments in Stockholm and Beijing established diplomatic relations, Sweden recognized the Republic of China.	Xiong Xiling	Karl Staaff	
April 13, 1916	Yan Huiqing	zh:颜惠庆	Accredited in Germany, Sweden and Denmark	Xu Shichang	Hjalmar Hammarskjöld	May 1, 1920
October 3, 1920	Tchang Tsou Seng	zh:章祖申	Both in Norway	Sa Zhenbing	Hjalmar Branting	June 17, 1922
June 17, 1922	Tai Tch’enne Linne	戴陈霖	Both in Norway and Denmark	Wang Ch'ung-hui	Oscar von Sydow	October 24, 1925
February 23, 1926	Tseng Tsung-Kien	zh:曾宗鉴	Both in Norway	Du Xigui	Carl Gustaf Ekman	February 27, 1929
February 27, 1929	Chu Chang Nien	zh:诸昌年	Both in Norway and Finland	Tan Yankai	Arvid Lindman	February 1, 1934
July 16, 1934	Beue Tann		Charge d Affairs	Wang Jingwei	Felix Hamrin	September 1, 1936
May 19, 1936	Wang King-Ky	zh:王景岐	Both in Norway	Chiang Kai-shek	Per Albin Hansson	October 21, 1938
October 21, 1938	Hsieh Wei-lin	谢维麟	At the beginning of the year, August 31, 1943,	H. H. Kung	Per Albin Hansson	September 18, 1947
September 18, 1947			the Swedish Embassy upgraded to the embassy, the Minister Xie Weilin was promoted to ambassador.	Chang Ch’ün	Östen Undén	
September 18, 1947	Hsieh Wei-lin	谢维麟		Chang Ch’ün	Östen Undén	January 19, 1950
January 19, 1950			the embassy was closed due to severance.	Chang Ch’ün	Östen Undén	
May 9, 1950			establishment of diplomatic relations between the People's Republic of China and the Kingdom of Sweden.	Zhou Enlai	Östen Undén	

- Geng Biao (1950.09 - 1956.02)
- Han Nianlong (1956.05 - 1958.10)
- Dong Yueqian (1959.01 - 1964.01)
- Yang Bozhen (1964.02 - 1969.05)
- Wang Dong (politician) (1969.06 - 1971.12)
- Wang Luming (1972.03 - 1974.04)
- Qin Lizhen (1974.08 - 1979.06)
- Cao Keqiang (1979.09 - 1982.12)
- Wang Ze (1983.02 - 1984.09)
- Wu Jiagan (1984.12 - 1988.06)
- Tang Longbin (1988.07 - 1993.07)
- Yang Guirong (1993.08 - 1997.02)
- Qiao Zonghuai (1997.03 - 1998.10)
- Wang Guisheng (1998.12 - 2001.11)
- Zou Mingrong (2001.12 - 2004.06)
- Lu Fengding (2004.09 - 2008.04)
- Chen Mingming (2008.05 - 2011.03)
- Lan Lijun (2011.03 - 2017.08)
- Gui Congyou (2017.08 - 2021.09)
- Cui Aimin (2021.12 - present)
