= Jinhua (disambiguation) =

Jinhua (金华市) is a prefecture-level city in central Zhejiang province, People's Republic of China.

Jinhua may also refer to:

== Subdistricts ==
- Jinhua Subdistrict, Guangzhou (金花街道), subdivision of Liwan District, Guangzhou, Guangdong
- Jinhua Subdistrict, Chishui (金华街道), subdivision of Chishui City, Guizhou
- Jinhua Subdistrict, Gaoyang County (锦华街道), subdivision of Gaoyang County, Hebei
- Jinhua Subdistrict, Da'an, Jilin (锦华街道), subdivision of Da'an, Jilin
- Jinhua Subdistrict, Jinzhong (晋华街道), subdivision of Yuci District, Jinzhong, Shanxi

== Towns ==
- Jinhua, Mianzhu (zh; 金花镇), subdivision of Mianzhu, Sichuan

Written as "金华镇"

- Jinhua, Guiyang (zh), subdivision of Wudang District, Guiyang, Guizhou
- Jinhua, Shehong County (zh), subdivision of Shehong County, Sichuan
- Jinhua, Xinjin County (zh), subdivision of Xinjin County, Sichuan
- Jinhua, Yunnan(zh), subdivision of Jianchuan County, Yunnan

Written as "进化镇"

- Jinhua, Fengyang County (zh), subdivision of Fengyang County, Guizhou
- Jinhua, Meihekou (zh), subdivision of Meihekou, Jilin
- Jinhua, Hangzhou (zh), subdivision of Xiaoshan District, Hangzhou, Zhejiang

== Townships ==
Written as "金华乡"

- Jinhua Township, Henan (zh), subdivision of Wancheng District, Nanyang, Henan
- Jinhua Township, Jilin (zh), subdivision of Changbai County, Jilin

Written as "金花乡"

- Jinhua Township, Rong County, Sichuan (zh), subdivision of Rong County, Sichuan
- Jinhua Township, Meishan (zh), subdivision of Dongpo District, Meishan, Sichuan

== People ==
- Chen Jinhua, Chinese politician
- Dai Jinhua (Chinese: 戴锦华; born 1959), Chinese feminist critic
- Li Jinhua (diplomat) (Chinese: 李金华; born 1932), Chinese diplomat
- Li Jinhua (politician) (Chinese: 李金华; born 1943), Chinese politician
- Lu Jinhua (1927–2018), Chinese opera performer
- Mao Jinhua, eldest daughter of Mao Zedong
- Sai Jinhua (Chinese: 賽金花; 1872–1936), Chinese prostitute
- Tang Jinhua (Chinese: 汤金华; born 1992), Chinese badminton player
- Xue Jinhua (born 1965), Chinese handball player
- Yang Jinhua (Chinese: 楊謹華; born 1977), Taiwanese actress
- Jinhua Ye, Chinese chemist

== Other uses ==
- Jin Chinese (晋话), a subdivision of spoken Chinese
- Jinhua dialect, a dialect of Wu Chinese specific to the city of Jinhua
- Jinhua railway station (金华站), (both CRH and China Railway) in Jinhua
- Jinhua station (Chengdu Metro), a metro station in Chengdu
