= Wang Dong (diplomat) =

Chinese diplomat

Wang Dong (Chinese: 王栋) (1922–1983) was a Chinese diplomat. He was Ambassador of the People's Republic of China to Sweden (1969–1971) and Canada (1977–1983).

Preceded by Yang Bozhen	Ambassador of China to Sweden; 1969–1971	Succeeded by Wang Luming
Preceded by Zhang Wenjin	Ambassador of China to Canada; 1977–1983	Succeeded by
