= List of ambassadors of China to New Zealand =

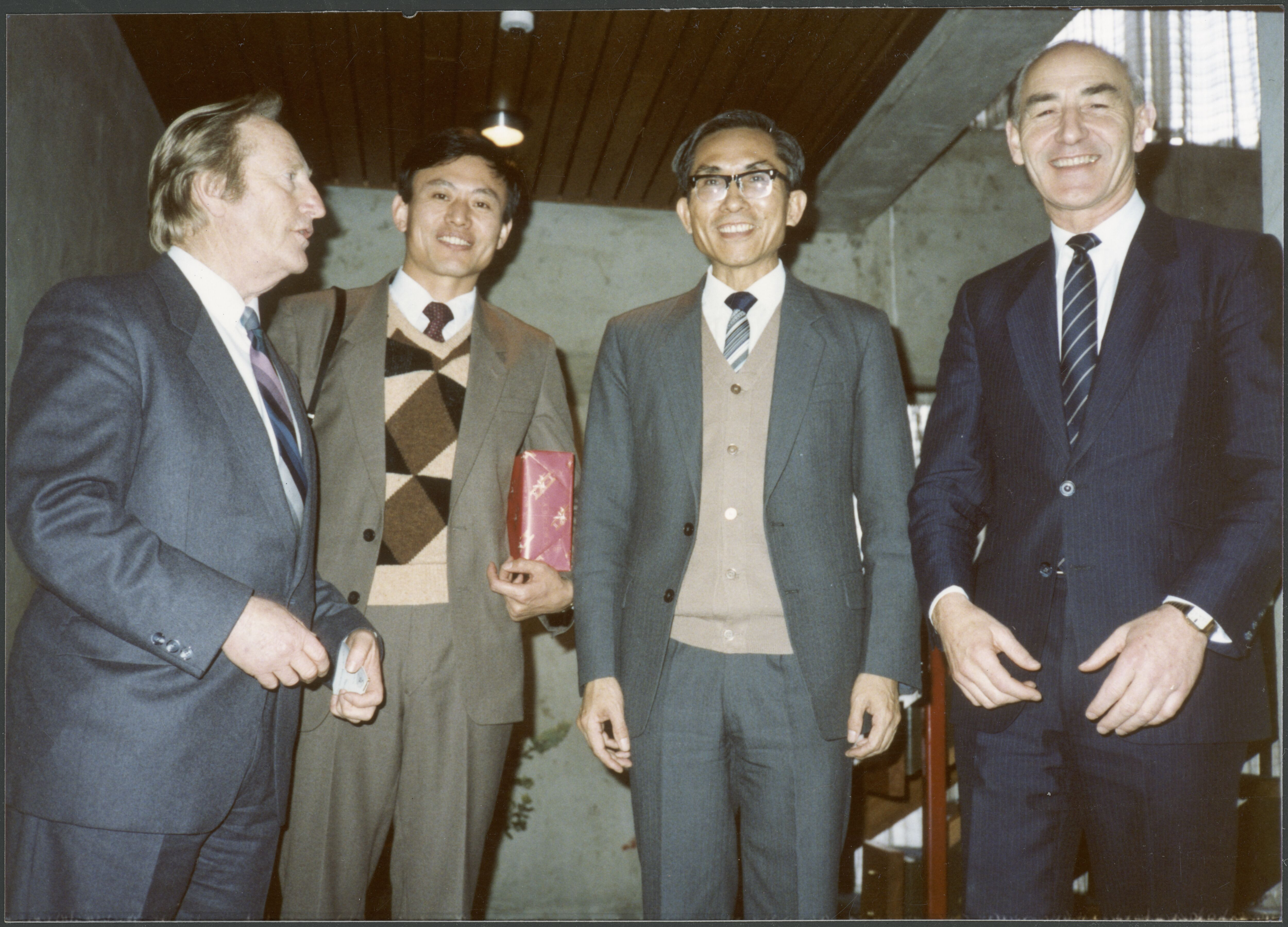
Visit of Ambassador Ni Zhengjian (second from right) to Palmerston North (mayor Paul Rieger on the right)

The ambassador of China to New Zealand is the official representative of the People's Republic of China to New Zealand.

The ambassador is also accredited to the Cook Islands and Niue.

== List of representatives ==
Designated	Accredited	Consul General/Ambassador	Chinese language zh:中国驻新西兰大使列表	Observations	Premier of China	Prime Minister of New Zealand	End of Term
May 1908		Yung-Liang Hwang	zh:黄荣良	Consul (representative) (*1876 in Wuwei, Anhui): 1896: received the degree of A. B. from the University of Nanking.; 1897–1899: professor and dean at the same institution.; In October 1909, he served in New Zealand's first Consul General Consulate, Consul General in Australia.; 1920 he was minister to Vienna,	Xuantong Emperor	Joseph Ward	May 1911
May 1911		Wong Wing Leung	夏廷献	Consul (representative)	Xuantong Emperor	Joseph Ward	1911
1911		Zhou Xi	周玺	Consul (representative)	Xuantong Emperor	Joseph Ward	
9 December 1912	21 November 1913	Kwei Chin	桂植	Consul (representative)	Yuan Shikai	Thomas Mackenzie	
15 October 1917		Lin Shi Yuan	林軾垣		Duan Qirui	William Massey	5 August 1922
5 August 1922		Li Guangheng	李光亨		Wang Ch'ung-hui	William Massey	
1939		Wang Feng (1902)	汪丰	Consul General with the rank of Minister (* 1902 in Beiping) 1925: graduated from Nankai University, 1919–1925 took an active part in various students patriotic movements, Tientsin, 1926–1929: participated in revolutionary activities, concurrently engaged in the political training of the 33rd Army, Nationalist Northern Expeditionary Force, and in organizing the masses in Anhui; secretary, Ministry of Foreign affairs in Portuguese East Africa, Northern and Southern Rhodesia and Belgian Congo; Chinese Consul General at Wellington, New Zealand, 1939 and with the rank of Minister since 1946	H. H. Kung	Michael Joseph Savage	1946
29 April 1946		Wang Shih-Chieh	余职慎	(* 1891 – 1981) Consul General	Chiang Kai-shek	Peter Fraser	13 December 1956
1953		Tien Fang Cheng	田方城	(* 1905 in Hupeh) m. Chou Wen-tsun; 4 children. Educ.: Grad., Coll. of Finance and Commerce; London Univ. Attache, Sec, Chinese Embassy, London, 33–41; Sec. and Sect. Chief, Min. of Foreign Affairs, 41–43; Sec, Chinese Legation to Portugal, 43–47; Sec, Office of Chinese Del. to UN, 1947/1948; Sec, Min. of Foreign Affairs, 48–49; Chief, Personnel Dept., Min. of Foreign Affairs, 49–53; Consul Gen., Wellington, 53–58.	Chen Cheng	Sidney Holland	13 December 1958
1958		Daniel Yu-tang Lew	劉毓棠	Consul Gen., Wellington, 58–63 (*1913 in Guangzhou †2005 in Taipei) m. Zhang Yalan; 3 sons. Educ.: Grad., Yenching University; Ph.D, Harvard University, 1941. Secretary to the Chinese Ambassador in Washington, DC, 43–46; Secretary to the Chinese Delegation at the United Nations Charter Conference, San Francisco, 45; Secretary to the Prime Minister, Nanjing 47–48; Diplomatic Liaison Officer, Chinese Mission to Gen. Douglas MacArthur's Headquarters, Tokyo, 1950; Consul Gen., Vancouver, BC, Canada, 1956–58	Chen Cheng	Keith Holyoake	1961
1 December 1960	1961	Chen Chih-Mai	陳之邁	(23 August 1908 in Tianjin – 8 November 1978) with residence in Canberra. Was a graduate of Tsing-hua College, first ambassador of the Republic of Chinese to New Zealand.	Chen Cheng	Keith Holyoake	1963
30 May 1963		Daniel Yu-tang Lew	劉毓棠	First resident Chinese Ambassador in New Zealand, 63–66 (*1913 in Guangzhou †2005 in Taipei) m. Zhang Yalan; 3 sons. Educ.: Grad., Yenching University; Ph.D, Harvard University, 1941. Secretary to the Chinese Ambassador in Washington, DC, 43–46; Secretary to the Chinese Delegation at the United Nations Charter Conference, San Francisco, 45; Secretary to the Prime Minister, Nanjing 47–48; Professor, National Tsinghua University, Beijing, 48–49; Diplomatic Liaison Officer, Chinese Mission to Gen. Douglas MacArthur's Headquarters, Tokyo, 1950; Consul Gen., Vancouver, BC, Canada, 1956–58; Consul Gen., Wellington, 58–63; Professor of Political Science, Mackinac College, 1966–70; Ambassador, United Nations, New York, 70–71; Minister, Brasilia, DF, 72–74; Prof. and Dir., Graduate Institute of American Studies, Chinese Culture University, 75–88	Chen Cheng	Keith Holyoake	1966
1966		Tsai Wei-ping	zh:蔡維屏	(*9 August 1911 † 25 January 1997 in Taipei): graduated from Nanjing University of Nanking, MA, Ph.D., University of Illinois political science literature.; consul general in Honolulu, 7 July 1968 vice foreign minister.; Ambassador in Saudi Arabia.	Yen Chia-kan	Keith Holyoake	7 July 1968
17 August 1968		Konsin C. Shah	zh:夏功權	(*17 September 1919 in Chekiang province † 18 October 2008): graduate of Georgetown University in Washington D.C.; In 1949 He was co-pilot and navigator on the flight that brought Chiang Kai-shek to Taiwan.; from 1964 to 1968 He was director of the protocol department of the Ministry of Foreign Affairs.; from 1973 to 1978 last Permanent Representative of Taiwan to the United Nations and Consul General in New York City.; 1978–1979 he was Chairman of the Asia World Plaza Corp.; 1979–1981 first unofficial representative Coordinating Council for North American Affairs after derecognition in 1979.; 1981–1985: Ambabassador to Montevideo Uruguay.	Yen Chia-kan	Keith Holyoake	4 December 1972
May 1973		Pei Jianzhang	zh:裴坚章		Zhou Enlai	Norman Kirk	April 1979
December 1979		Qin Lizhen	zh:秦力真		Hua Guofeng	Robert Muldoon	October 1983
January 1984		Zhang Longhai	zh:张龙海		Zhao Ziyang	David Lange	August 1987
October 1987		Ni Zhengjian	zh:倪政健	December 1984 – August 1987 Ambassador in Guyana.	Li Peng	David Lange	October 1991
November 1991		Li Jinhua	zh:李金华 (外交官)	(* September 1932 in Jinan): Nankai University history graduate.; On the eve of the founding of the People's Republic of China, Li Jinhua was admitted to Nankai University Department of History.; After graduation, she was assigned to the Ministry of Foreign Intelligence Division.; Deputy Director of the Foreign Ministry Information Department.; She was the first People's Republic of China Foreign Ministry spokeswoman.	Li Peng	Jim Bolger	March 1995
May 1995		Huang Guifang	zh:黄桂芳	(*September 1939 in Xiamen, Fujian Province): In 1964 he graduated from the Diplomatic Academy, Ministry of Foreign Affairs into the People's Republic of China.; Stationed: Ministry of Foreign Affairs Research Center, Kampala Uganda, the Information Department as Attaché, Third Secretary, Deputy Director, First Secretary, Counsellor.; 1988–1991, director of the General Office of the State Council Huang Guifang, deputy director of Foreign Affairs Office of the State Council.; In 1991 ambassador in Manila.; In 1998 ambassador in Harare (Zimbabwe); In July 2000 retirement.	Li Peng	Jim Bolger	January 1998
2 April 1998	February 1998	Chen Wenzhao	zh:陈文照	1993: first Secretary in Ottawa	Zhu Rongji	Jenny Shipley	February 2001
30 March 2001	March 2001	Chen Mingming	zh:陈明明	From 2008 to 2011 he was Ambassador Stockholm Sweden.	Zhu Rongji	Helen Clark	December 2005
6 December 2005	February 2006	Zhang Yuanyuan (1950)	zh:张援远	(*November 1950 in Harbin, Heilongjiang Province): He graduated from the University of Toronto, Ontario, Canada, the United States and the Fletcher School of Law graduate diplomacy.; 1973–1976 Carleton University, University of Toronto student; 1977–1981 Chinese Consulate General in Vancouver; 1986–1990 Second Secretary, Permanent Mission, First Secretary People's Republic of China; 1990–1994 First Secretary Ministry of Foreign Affairs Translation Office, Director; 1994–1995 American Fletcher School of Law graduate and diplomacy; Ministry of Foreign Affairs 1995–1998 Counsellor Interpreter; 2001–2005: director of the Foreign Ministry Interpreter; 2008 to 2011 ambassador to Belgium.	Wen Jiabao	Helen Clark	
19 August 2008	August 2008	Zhang Limin	zh:张利民	From March 2003 to October 2005 he was Ambassador to Cyprus; From November 2005 to July 2008 he was ambassador in Latvia; From August 2008 to August 2010 he was Ambassador to New Zealand and also to the Cook Islands and Niue; Since December 2012 he is ambassador to Guyana.	Wen Jiabao	John Key	
19 September 2010	August 2010	Xu Jianguo (1955)	zh:徐建国 (外交官)		Wen Jiabao	John Key	
26 November 2013	October 2013	Wang Lutong	王鲁彤		Li Keqiang	John Key	16 November 2017
	26 March 2018	Wu Xi			Li Keqiang	Jacinda Ardern	

== See also ==
- China–New Zealand relations
- List of ambassadors of New Zealand to China
