= Li Jinhua =

Li Jinhua may refer to:

- Li Jinhua (politician)
- Li Jinhua (diplomat)
