= Hua Chunying =

Chinese diplomat (born 1970)

- 华春莹
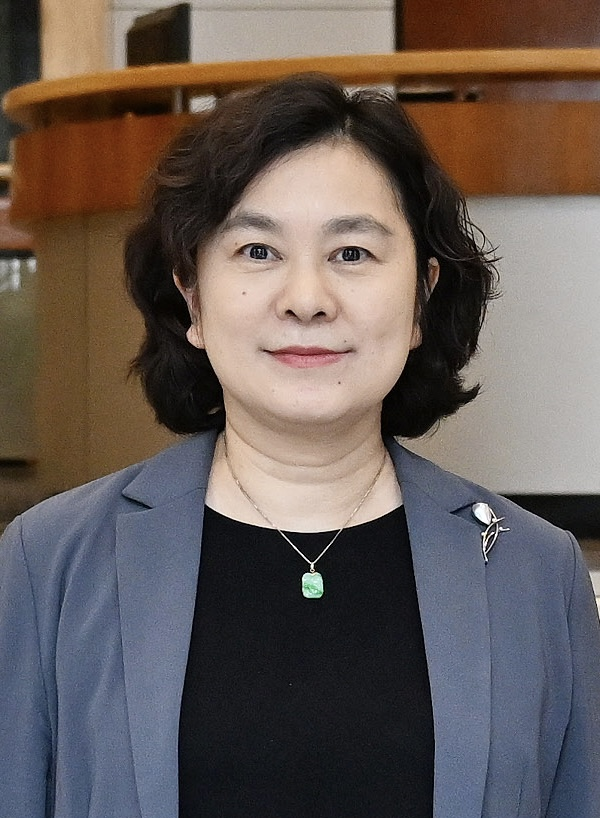
- Hua in 2024

Vice Minister of Foreign Affairs
- Incumbent
- Assumed office 27 May 2024 Serving with Deng Li, Ma Zhaoxu, Sun Weidong
- Minister: Wang Yi

Assistant Minister of Foreign Affairs
- In office 25 October 2021 – 27 May 2024
- Minister: Wang Yi; Qin Gang
- Preceded by: Deng Li
Additional positions
Director General of the Department of Press, Communication and Public Diplomacy of the Ministry of Foreign Affairs
In office 18 July 2019 – 15 January 2025
Deputy	Mao Ning, Hu Jian, Lin Jian, Jiang Xiaoyan
Preceded by	Lu Kang
Succeeded by	Mao Ning
Deputy Director General of the Department of Press, Communication and Public Diplomacy of the Ministry of Foreign Affairs
In office August 2012 – July 2019
Director	Qin Gang; Liu Jianchao; Lu Kang
Preceded by	Hong Lei
Succeeded by	Yu Dunhai

Personal details
- Born: April 24, 1970 (age 56) Huaiyin, Jiangsu, China
- Party: Chinese Communist Party (1993–present)
- Parent(s): Qian Yong (father); Hua Jie (mother)
- Relatives: Qian Chunmin (sister)
- Education: Nanjing University (BLit)
- Occupation: Diplomat

Chinese name
- Simplified Chinese: 华春莹
- Traditional Chinese: 華春瑩
Transcriptions
Standard Mandarin
- Hanyu Pinyin: Huà Chūnyíng

Hua Chunying (Chinese: 华春莹; born 24 April 1970) is a Chinese diplomat who has been serving as Vice Minister of Foreign Affairs of China since 2024. She most notably served as spokesperson of the Ministry of Foreign Affairs.

After graduating from Nanjing University with a major in English language and literature in 1992, Hua joined the Ministry of Foreign Affairs as a section member. She served as staff member, attaché, and third secretary in the Ministry's Department of Western Europe and the China Embassy in Singapore from 1992 to 2003. She served as second secretary, first secretary, and then counselor in the Mission of China to the European Union from 2003 to 2010. Hua then served as counselor at the Department of European Affairs from 2010 to 2012, deputy director general of the Department of Press, Communication and Public Diplomacy from 2012 to 2019, and director general of the Department of Press, Communication and Public Diplomacy from 2019 to 2025. She was appointed as the Assistant Minister of Foreign Affairs from 2021 to 2024.

== Early life ==
Hua was born in Huai'an, Jiangsu. Both her parents were officials. Her father was formerly secretary of the Chinese Communist Party Huai'an County Discipline Inspection Commission, and her mother was the deputy director of a local district. She graduated from Nanjing University in 1992 with a Bachelor of Literature, majoring in English language and literature.

== Career ==
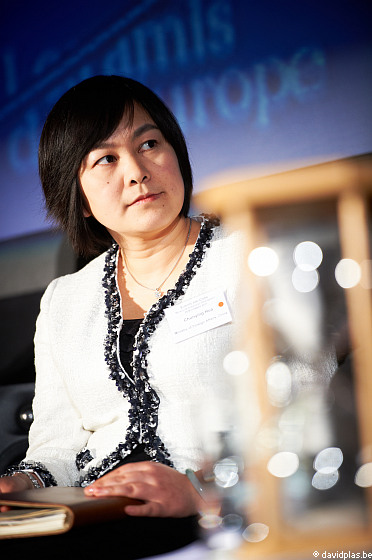
Hua as Counsellor at the European Department of the Ministry of Foreign Affairs, November 2011

After graduation, Hua joined the Ministry of Foreign Affairs of China as a section member in the ministry's Department of Western Europe. Over a period of 20 years, Hua worked her way up to the position of spokeswoman. From 1995, she spent four years in Singapore as an attaché. During 2003 to 2010, she was promoted from secretary to counselor in China's mission to the European Union.

In 2012, Hua was promoted to deputy director of the Information Department of the Ministry of Foreign Affairs. She served concurrently as the spokeswoman for the ministry. In February 2018, during a prolonged absence at the Foreign Ministry, there were reports that Hua was investigated for storing large amounts of U.S. dollars in her home. On March 1, 2018, Hua returned to work as Foreign Ministry spokeswoman.

On July 18, 2019, she was appointed director general of the Foreign Ministry Department of Press, Communication and Public Diplomacy, succeeding Lu Kang. She became the second female director general of the Department of Press, Communication and Public Diplomacy after Gong Peng, the very first director general of this department. In October 2021, she was promoted to assistant minister of foreign affairs. Hua oversees the ministry's work related to press, protocol, and translation. Hua was a delegate to the 19th and 20th National Congress of the Chinese Communist Party.

On May 27, 2024, the State Council appointed Hua Chunying as Vice Minister of Foreign Affairs.

On January 15, 2025, Hua stepped down from her role as the spokesperson of the Chinese Foreign Ministry. She continued to serve as Vice Minister.

== Commentary ==
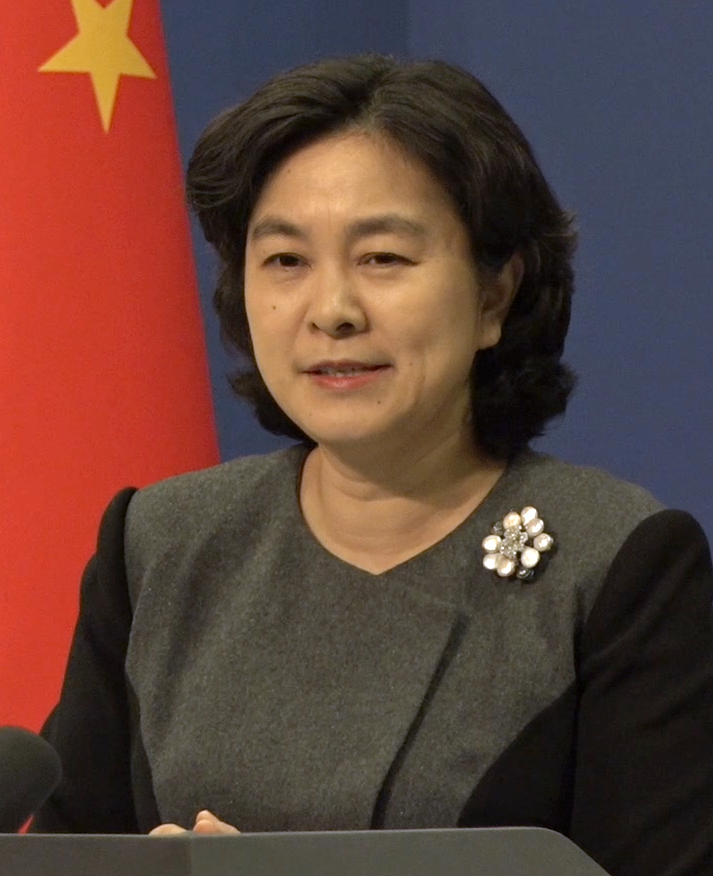
Hua as spokeswoman of the foreign ministry, 2019

Hua is widely considered as a wolf warrior diplomat. In 2020, she stated that she was "fine" being called a wolf-warrior diplomat as long as she defends the legitimate interests of China regarding sovereignty, security, and development. Academics noted her "manly" assertiveness in diplomatic discourse, noting similar communication patterns with her male colleagues such as Zhao Lijian. Hua's diplomatic style was soon copied by female diplomats such as Mao Ning, who became spokeswoman in September 2022.

Hua has criticized the US plea to release Pu Zhiqiang, saying, "I think lots of people have the same feeling with me, that some people in the United States have hearts that are too big and hands that are too long. Washington should address human rights problems at home and stop trying to be the world's policeman or judge." In 2020, Hua retweeted a story published by The Grayzone that claimed to debunk research into the re-education camps in Xinjiang detaining Uyghurs.

In 2021, she compared the January 6 United States Capitol attack with the 2019 storming of the Legislative Council Complex.

=== Afghanistan ===
Amidst criticism from the Australian and New Zealand governments in 2020 over a computer-generated image posted by Chinese Foreign Ministry Spokesman Zhao Lijian on Twitter depicting an Australian soldier cutting an Afghan child's throat, Hua said: "The Australian side has been reacting so strongly to my colleague's tweet. Why is that? Do they think that their merciless killing of Afghan civilians is justified but the condemnation of such ruthless brutality is not? Afghan lives matter!"

Just hours after the fall of Kabul in August 2021, Hua stated in a press conference that China stood "ready to continue to develop good-neighborliness and friendly cooperation with Afghanistan and play a constructive role in Afghanistan's peace and reconstruction."

=== COVID-19 conspiracy theory ===
In January 2021, Hua renewed the conspiracy theory that the SARS-CoV-2 virus originated in the United States at the Fort Detrick Army Medical Command Installation. Her words quickly became a trending topic on the Chinese social media platform Weibo, and Hua continued to cite evidence on Twitter, while asking the government of the United States to open up Fort Detrick for further investigation to determine if it is the source of the SARS-CoV-2 virus.

Regarding the State Council's white paper Fighting COVID-19, China in Action, Hua stated that it was published to "keep a record" and ensure that "the history of the combat against the pandemic" was not "tainted by lies and misinformation" but "recorded with the correct collective memory of all mankind".

=== Pakistan ===
After Indian PM Narendra Modi indirectly called Pakistan a "mothership of terrorism" at the 2016 BRICS summit, Hua told a local news briefing: "Everyone knows that India and Pakistan are victims of terrorism. Pakistan has made huge efforts and great sacrifices in fighting terrorism. I think the international community should respect this." She published a similar statement in August 2017 after US President Trump accused Pakistan of offering safe haven to terrorists.

=== Social media ===
In February 2021, Hua said that many Western officials use Weibo and Wechat, and asked, "Why can't Chinese people use Twitter or Facebook when foreigners can use Chinese social media platforms?" Twitter and Facebook have been banned by the mainland Chinese government since 2009.

=== Taiwan ===
In August 2022, Hua warned that Nancy Pelosi should not visit Taiwan, threatening that, "We closely follow Pelosi's itinerary. If the U.S. insists on going its own way, China will take firm and powerful measures to safeguard China's sovereignty and security interests." Later that month, after Pelosi's visit, Hua made a tweet asserting that Taiwan was a part of China because "Baidu Maps show [sic] that there are 38 Shandong dumpling restaurants and 67 Shanxi noodle restaurants in Taipei." The tweet was ridiculed by other Twitter users, who replied with examples of restaurant listings across the world.

=== Gaza war ===
In April 2024, Hua posted several video screenshots and photos in the social media platform X showing American police crackdowns on large-scale campus protests against United States support for Israel in the Gaza war. She said in one post: "Remember how U.S. officials reacted when these protests happened elsewhere."

== See also ==
- Xi Jinping Thought on Diplomacy

Government offices
Preceded by Hong Lei	Deputy Director General of the Department of Press, Communication and Public Diplomacy of the Ministry of Foreign Affairs; 2012–2019	Succeeded by Yu Dunhai
Preceded by Lu Kang	Director General of the Department of Press, Communication and Public Diplomacy of the Ministry of Foreign Affairs; 2019–2025	Succeeded by Mao Ning
Preceded by Deng Li	Assistant Minister of Foreign Affairs; 2021–2024	Incumbent
