= Yu Dunhai =

Chinese diplomat

- 于敦海

Chinese Ambassador to Nigeria
- Incumbent
- Assumed office August 2024
- Preceded by: Cui Jianchun

Chinese Ambassador to Malta
- In office December 2020 – June 2024
- Preceded by: Jiang Jiang

Deputy Director of the Information Department of the Ministry of Foreign Affairs
- In office July 2019 – December 2020 Serving with Wang Wenbin and Zhao Lijian
- Director: Liu Jianchao; Lu Kang; Hua Chunying
- Preceded by: Hua Chunying

Personal details
- Born: September 1973 (age 52) Jimo, Shandong, China (present-day Jimo District in Qingdao, Shandong, China)
- Party: Chinese Communist Party

Yu Dunhai (Chinese: 于敦海; born September 1973) is a Chinese diplomat, currently serving as Chinese Ambassador to Nigeria, in office since August 2024. He previously served as the Chinese Ambassador to Malta from 2020 to 2024 and deputy director of the Information Department of the Ministry of Foreign Affairs of China from 2019 to 2020.

== Early life ==
Yu was born in the city of Jimo in Shandong, in 1973. He graduated from Renmin University.

== Diplomatic career ==
In 1998, he joined the Ministry of Foreign Affairs of China and from 1998 to 2001, he served as staff member and attaché of the Arms Control Department within the ministry. From 2001 to 2005, he served as the attaché and third secretary of the Permanent Mission to the Organisation for the Prohibition of Chemical Weapons. From 2005 to 2010, Yu was the third secretary and deputy director of the Arms Control Department. He served as second secretary, first secretary and counselor at the Embassy of China in the United States, from 2010 to 2016.

Upon his arrival from the United States in 2016, he was appointed as counsellor of the Information Department within the ministry. During his tenure, he served as the director of the press center of the 2017 BRICS Summit in Xiamen, China. In 2018, he was appointed as the deputy director-general of the Information Department, succeeding Hua Chunying. While in this position, he served as press director at the 2018 Shanghai Cooperation Organization summit in Qingdao, China.

In December 2020, he was appointed as the Ambassador Extraordinary and Plenipotentiary to Malta. During his tenure, a China pavilion consisting of Chinese art and cultural exhibits, was featured at Malta's first art biennale held at Fort Saint Elmo in 2024. In a 2022 op-ed for Times of Malta, Yu wrote that the China and Malta friendship has "gone from strength to strength and continues to renew its vigour." He resigned from the position in June 2024 and in the August of the same year, he was appointed as the Ambassador Extraordinary and Plenipotentiary to Nigeria.

== Personal life ==
He is married and has a daughter.

Diplomatic posts
Preceded by Cui Jianchun (崔建春)	Chinese Ambassador to Nigeria; 2024-	Succeeded by Incumbent
Preceded by Jiang Jiang (姜江)	Chinese Ambassador to Malta; 2020-2024	Succeeded by Zhang Zuo
