= Pei Jianzhang =

Chinese diplomat

Pei Jianzhang (Chinese: 裴坚章; born 1927) is a Chinese retired diplomat. He was born in Rizhao, Shandong.

He joined the Chinese Communist Party in 1945. He was acting chargé d'affaires for China in the United Kingdom (1971). He served as the first Chinese ambassador to New Zealand (1973–1979) and concurrently to Papua New Guinea (1977–1979). He later served as the Chinese ambassador to Libya from 1979 to 1983.

| Preceded by New office | Chinese Ambassador to New Zealand and Papua New Guinea; 1973–1979 | Succeeded by Qin Lizhen (New Zealand), Lin Ping (Papua New Guinea) |
| Preceded by New office | Chinese Ambassador to Libya; 1979–1984 | Succeeded by |
