= List of ambassadors of China to Norway =

Coordinates: 59.941377°N 10.701312°E

Chinese Ambassador to Norway
- Incumbent; Wang Min since March 2016
- Inaugural holder: Shen Jui-ling
- Formation: 3 October 1920; 105 years ago

The Chinese ambassador to Norway is the official representative of the People's Republic of China to the Kingdom of Norway.

== List of representatives ==
Diplomatic agrément/Diplomatic accreditation	ambassador	Chinese language zh:中国驻挪威大使列表	Observations	Premier of the People's Republic of China	List of heads of government of Norway	Term end
May 27, 1920			The government of the Republic of China set up a consulate in Oslo and appointed the ambassadors with residence in Stockholm concurrently to Oslo.	Sa Zhenbing	Otto Bahr Halvorsen	
October 3, 1920	Shen Jui-ling	zh:章祖申	Shen Juiling	Sa Zhenbing	Otto Bahr Halvorsen	June 17, 1922
June 16, 1922	Tai Chen Lin	戴陈霖	Tai Ch'en-Lin, (戴陈霖 — Chekiang.: Studied in language schools in Shanghai and Peking.; Graduated from a college in France.; Attached to Chinese Legation at Paris.; Councillor of the Waichiaopu, April, 1912.; Chinese Minister at Madrid. Appointed Minister to Sweden, Norway and Denmark, June 16, 1922.	Wang Ch'ung-hui	Otto Albert Blehr	October 24, 1925
February 23, 1926	T. K. Tseng	zh:曾宗鑒	Tseng Tsung-chien Tsen Tsung-kien T. K. Tseng (born 1881 in Minhou, Fujian, died in 1958 in the United States). *In 1901 he took his first degree at Nanyang College in Shanghai and was sent to England. *From 1901 to 1907 he studied at King's College after which he studied at Pembroke College at Cambridge University. *From 1911 to 1912, during the Xinhai Revolution he was secretary of the Duan Qirui. *Till 1917 he was employed in the Foreign Ministry in Beijing. *From 1926 to 1929 he was Consul General in Australia and Minister of Sweden and Norway.	Du Xigui	Ivar Lykke (politician)	February 27, 1929
February 27, 1929	Chu Chang-nien	zh:诸昌年	Chu Chang-nien, former Chinese Minister to Norway and Sweden, is understood to have been slated as Customs Superintendent of Shanghai succeeding H. O. Tong.: Expulsion of Chinese Merchants in Norway; The right of three Chinese merchants to continued residence in Norway has become an issue between the Chinese Legation at Oslo and the Norwegian government.; In May last, the Ministry of Foreign Affairs instructed the Chinese Minister to Norway to take up the matter with the Norwegian Government.	Tan Yankai	Christopher Hornsrud	February 1, 1934
May 19, 1936	Wang King-ky	zh:王景岐	Dr. Wang King-ky, vice-chairman of the Treaty Commission of the Waichiaopu, was appointed May 3 Chinese Minister to Norway and Sweden, a post that has been vacant for some time.	Chiang Kai-shek	Johan Nygaardsvold	October 21, 1938
October 21, 1938	Hsieh Wei-lin	谢维麟		H. H. Kung	Johan Nygaardsvold	May 31, 1943
August 1, 1940			Due to the German invasion of Norway the Chinese mission in Oslo was closed.	Chiang Kai-shek	Johan Nygaardsvold	
June 17, 1943			The representation of the Chinese evasive government in Chongqing to the Norwegian exil government in London was declared embassy.	Chiang Kai-shek	Johan Nygaardsvold	
August 31, 1943	Tsien Tai	钱泰	Chien, Tai (prefiere Tsien, Tai) Funcionario diplomático, nativo de Chekiang, nacido en 1887 docteur en droit, Ministro de París y más tarde Embajador en Bélgica, 1933–42 Viceministro de Relaciones Exteriores, 1942 Embajador en Bélgica, 1943–44 Embajador en Francia, 1944–49., Appointed in July 1943 to be concurrently first Chinese Ambassador to the Norwegian Government in London.	Chiang Kai-shek	Johan Nygaardsvold	September 6, 1944
September 6, 1944	Wunz King	zh:金问泗		Chiang Kai-shek	Johan Nygaardsvold	October 5, 1949
October 5, 1950			The governments in Beijing and Oslo established diplomatic relations.	Zhou Enlai	Einar Gerhardsen	
October 1950	Geng Biao	zh:耿ヒョウ		Zhou Enlai	Einar Gerhardsen	May 1955
June 1, 1955	Wang Youping	zh:王幼平		Zhou Enlai	Einar Gerhardsen	April 1958
May 1958	Xu Yixin	zh:徐以新		Zhou Enlai	Einar Gerhardsen	February 1962
April 1962	Qin Lizhen	zh:秦力真		Zhou Enlai	Einar Gerhardsen	January 1965
March 1965	Feng Yujiu	zh:冯于九		Zhou Enlai	Per Borten	July 1967
February 1971	Hao Deqing	zh:郝德青		Zhou Enlai	Trygve Bratteli	August 1972
September 1972	Cao Chun'geng	zh:曹春耕		Zhou Enlai	Lars Korvald	December 1976
May 1977	Liu Shuqing	zh:刘述卿		Hua Guofeng	Odvar Nordli	March 1980
August 1980	Ding Guoyu	zh:丁国珏		Zhao Ziyang	Odvar Nordli	November 1982
August 1983	Zhang Yongkuan	zh:张永宽		Zhao Ziyang	Gro Harlem Brundtland	December 1986
January 1987	Li Baocheng	zh:李宝城		Li Peng	Gro Harlem Brundtland	December 1989
April 1990	Wang Xin'gui	zh:王桂新		Li Peng	Gro Harlem Brundtland	December 1993
February 1994	Zhu Yinglu	zh:朱应鹿		Li Peng	Gro Harlem Brundtland	June 1998
June 1998	Ma Enhan	zh:马恩汉		Zhu Rongji	Kjell Magne Bondevik	December 2002
January 2003	Chen Naiqing	zh:陈乃清		Wen Jiabao	Kjell Magne Bondevik	March 2007
April 2007	Gao Jian (diplomat)	zh:高建 (外交官)		Wen Jiabao	Jens Stoltenberg	June 2009
September 2009	Tang Guoqiang (PRC diplomat)	zh:唐国强 (外交官)		Wen Jiabao	Jens Stoltenberg	March 2012
May 2012	Zhao Jun (ambassador)	赵 军		Wen Jiabao	Jens Stoltenberg	
March 2016	Wang Min (PRC diplomat)	王民		Li Keqiang	Erna Solberg	
