= List of ambassadors of China to Libya =

Coordinates: 32.884850°N 13.185565°E

Chinese Ambassador to Libya
- Incumbent; Ma Xuliang since 18 February 2026
- Inaugural holder: Chih-Ping Chen
- Formation: 1 August 1959; 67 years ago

The Chinese ambassador to Libya is the official representative of the People's Republic of China to Libya.

== History ==
- From 1959 to September 14, 1978 the governments in Tripoli and Taipei maintained diplomatic relations.
- Since August 9, 1978 the governments of Tripoli and Beijing maintain diplomatic relations.

== List of representatives ==
Diplomatic agrément/Diplomatic accreditation	Ambassador	Chinese language 中国驻利比亚大使列表	Observations	Premier of the People's Republic of China	List of heads of state of Libya	Term end
September 11, 1959	Chih-Ping Chen	陈质平		Chen Cheng	Idris of Libya	June 30, 1965
August 23, 1965	Kiding Wang	王季征	(* March 26, 1914 in Fujian) He served as Minister of the Republic of China in Panama, in San Salvador, Minister of Honduras, Adviser to the Ministry of Foreign Affairs, Ambassador to Libya, Ambassador to Central Africa.: From October 1, 1957 to February 1, 1962 he was Chinese Ambassador to Lebanon.	Yen Chia-kan	Idris of Libya	November 16, 1968
December 2, 1968	Tsai Pa	蔡葩	(1914 in Hebei ) belongs to the Daxing people, presented his credentials on January 27, 1969. CHINA AND LIBYA Ambassador Tsai Pa presented his credentials on January 27, 1969.: Vice Foreign Minister H. K. Yang arrived in Libya October 4, 1968.; In 1957 he entered the foreign service was Counselor of the Embassy of the Republic of China in Jordan, Iran, Saudi Arabia, Brazil and other countries.; In 1964, he served as Deputy Director of the Ministry of Foreign Affairs, and later promoted to Director.; In 1968 he was succeeded by Tien Pao-tsi as head the Department of East Asian Affairs.	Yen Chia-kan	Idris of Libya	November 8, 1978
August 9, 1978			The governments in Tripoli and Beijing established diplomatic relations.	Hua Guofeng	Muammar Gaddafi	
September 6, 1979	Pei Jianzhang	裴坚章		Hua Guofeng	Muammar Gaddafi	November 1984
February 1985	Yang Hushan	杨虎山		Zhao Ziyang	Muammar Gaddafi	May 1989
August 4, 1989	Wang Houli	王厚立		Li Peng	Muammar Gaddafi	October 1994
November 12, 1994	Qin Hongguo	秦鸿国		Li Peng	Muammar Gaddafi	November 1997
December 1, 1997	Zhai Jun	翟隽		Li Peng	Muammar Gaddafi	June 2000
August 4, 2000	Luo Xingwu	罗兴武		Zhu Rongji	Muammar Gaddafi	August 2003
September 13, 2003	Huang Jiemin	黄杰民		Wen Jiabao	Muammar Gaddafi	April 2008
June 7, 2008	Wang Wangsheng	王旺生		Wen Jiabao	Muammar Gaddafi	July 2013
August 6, 2013	Li Zhiguo	李志国		Li Keqiang	Nouri Abusahmain	July 2017
February 18, 2026	Ma Xuliang	马旭亮		Li Qiang	Mohamed al-Menfi	
