= List of ambassadors of China to South Sudan =

Coordinates: 4.851456°N 31.590988°E

Chinese Ambassador to South Sudan
- Incumbent; He Xiangdong since 1 September 2016
- Inaugural holder: Chang Ching-yang
- Formation: 1 September 2008; 18 years ago

The Chinese ambassador to South Sudan is the official representative of the People's Republic of China to the Republic of South Sudan.

== List of representatives ==
Diplomatic agrément/Diplomatic accreditation	Ambassador	Chinese language zh:中国驻南苏丹大使列表	Observations	Premier of the People's Republic of China	List of heads of state of South Sudan	Term end
September 1, 2008	Chang Ching-yang	张清洋	Consul General	Wen Jiabao	Salva Kiir	September 1, 2010
November 1, 2010	Li Zhiguo	李志国	Consul General	Wen Jiabao	Salva Kiir	July 1, 2011
July 9, 2009			The founding of the Republic of South Sudan, China and South Sudan established diplomatic relations, the Consulate General in Juba was upgraded to the embassy.	Wen Jiabao	Salva Kiir	
July 1, 2011	Li Zhiguo	李志国		Wen Jiabao	Salva Kiir	July 1, 2013
July 1, 2013	en:Ma Qiang	zh:马强		Li Keqiang	Salva Kiir	September 1, 2016
September 1, 2016	He Xiangdong	何向东		Li Keqiang	Salva Kiir	

== See also ==
- China–South Sudan relations
