= Ma Qiang =

Chinese diplomat (born 1956)

- 马强

2nd Chinese Ambassador to South Sudan
- In office July 2013 – August 2016
- Preceded by: Li Zhiguo
- Succeeded by: He Xiangdong

Personal details
- Born: May 1956 (age 70) China
- Party: Chinese Communist Party
- Children: 1
- Education: Beijing Language and Culture University

Ma Qiang (simplified Chinese: 马强; traditional Chinese: 馬強; pinyin: Mā Qiáng; born May 1956) is a Chinese diplomat who served as Chinese Ambassador to South Sudan from 2013 to 2016.

== Life and career ==
Ma was born in May 1956. He graduated from Beijing Language and Culture University in 1982.

In July 2013, the 12th Standing Committee of the National People's Congress appointed him the Chinese Ambassador to South Sudan, succeeding Li Zhiguo.

Diplomatic posts
Preceded by Li Zhiguo	2nd Chinese Ambassador to South Sudan; 2013–2016	Succeeded by He Xiangdong
