= List of ambassadors of China to Hungary =

Coordinates: 47.509181°N 19.075753°E

Ambassador of China to Hungary
- Incumbent; Duan Jielong since June 2016
- Inaugural holder: Huang Zhen
- Formation: August 1950; 76 years ago

The ambassador of China to Hungary is the official representative of the People's Republic of China to Hungary.

== List of representatives ==
Diplomatic agrément/Diplomatic accreditation	Ambassador	Chinese language zh:中国驻匈牙利大使列表	Observations	Premier of the People's Republic of China	List of heads of state of Hungary	Term end
July 1, 1942	Wang Teh-Yin	zh:呂宜文	Representative of Manchukuo with residency in Berlin.	Puyi	Miklós Horthy	
November 12, 1938	Lue-I-Wen	zh:李芳 (1895年)	(*1895) Representative of the Reorganized National Government of the Republic of China with residency in Berlin, Minister to Bucarest and Copenhague.	Wang Jingwei	Miklós Horthy	
August 1950	Huang Zhen	zh:黄镇		Zhou Enlai	Sándor Rónai	October 1954
November 1954	Hao Deqing	zh:郝德青		Zhou Enlai	István Dobi	April 1961
June 1961	Chai Zemin	zh:柴泽民		Zhou Enlai	István Dobi	July 1964
August 1964	Han Kehua	zh:韩克华	(1919 - 1. September März 2003)	Zhou Enlai	István Dobi	August 1967
August 1970	Lü Zhixian	zh:吕志先		Zhou Enlai	Pál Losonczi	February 1973
March 1973	Li Zewang	zh:李则望		Zhou Enlai	Pál Losonczi	December 1976
March 1977	Liu Tiesheng	刘铁生		Hua Guofeng	Pál Losonczi	May 1978
April 1979	Feng Yujiu	zh:冯于九		Hua Guofeng	Pál Losonczi	January 1983
March 1983	Ma Lie	馬列		Zhao Ziyang	Pál Losonczi	May 1985
September 1985	Zhu Ankang	zh:朱安康		Zhao Ziyang	Pál Losonczi	October 1989
November 1989	Dai Bingguo	zh:戴秉国		Li Peng	Mátyás Szűrös	February 1992
May 1992	Chen Zhiliu	陈之骝		Li Peng	Árpád Göncz	June 1996
July 1996	Chen Guoyan	陈国焱		Li Peng	Árpád Göncz	January 2000
January 2000	Zhao Xidi	zh:赵希迪		Zhu Rongji	Ferenc Mádl	July 2003
September 2003	Zhu Zushou	zh:朱祖寿	(*June 1945)	Wen Jiabao	Ferenc Mádl	January 2007
March 2007	Zhang Chunxiang	zh:张春祥		Wen Jiabao	László Sólyom	July 2009
August 2009	Gao Jian	zh:高建 (外交官)		Wen Jiabao	László Sólyom	October 2012
November 2012	Xiao Qian	肖千		Wen Jiabao	János Áder	June 2015
June 2015	Duan Jielong	段潔龍		Li Keqiang	János Áder	
