= List of ambassadors of China to Zambia =

Coordinates: 15.418489°S 28.311849°E

Chinese Ambassador to Zambia
- Inaugural holder: Qin Lizhen
- Formation: 1 March 1965; 61 years ago

The Chinese ambassador to Zambia is the official representative of the People's Republic of China to the Republic of Zambia.

== List of representatives ==
Diplomatic agrément/Diplomatic accreditation	Ambassador	Chinese language zh:中国驻赞比亚大使列表	Observations	Premier of the People's Republic of China	List of presidents of Zambia	Term end
March 1, 1965	Qin Lizhen	zh:秦力真		Zhou Enlai	Kenneth Kaunda	July 1, 1972
September 1, 1972	Li Qiangfen	zh:李强奋		Zhou Enlai	Kenneth Kaunda	September 1, 1977
March 1, 1978	Ge Buhai	zh:葛步海		Hua Guofeng	Kenneth Kaunda	June 1, 1981
June 1, 1982	Zhang Junhua	zh:张俊华		Zhao Ziyang	Kenneth Kaunda	November 1, 1984
January 1, 1985	Gu Jiaji	zh:顾家骥		Zhao Ziyang	Kenneth Kaunda	June 1, 1987
August 1, 1987	Zhou Mingji	zh:周明基		Li Peng	Kenneth Kaunda	July 1, 1991
October 1, 1991	Yang Zengye	杨增业		Li Peng	Frederick Chiluba	October 1, 1996
November 1, 1996	Wang Yunxiang	王雲翔		Li Peng	Frederick Chiluba	July 1, 1999
August 1, 1999	Peng Keyu	彭克玉		Zhu Rongji	Frederick Chiluba	December 1, 2003
January 1, 2004	Hu Shouqin	胡守勤		Wen Jiabao	Levy Mwanawasa	November 1, 2004
August 1, 2005	Li Baodong	zh:李保东		Wen Jiabao	Levy Mwanawasa	March 1, 2007
April 1, 2007	Li Qiangmin	zh:李强民		Wen Jiabao	Levy Mwanawasa	May 1, 2011
May 1, 2011	Zhou Yuxiao	zh:周欲晓		Wen Jiabao	Michael Sata	July 1, 2014
July 1, 2014	Yang Youming	杨优明		Li Keqiang	Michael Sata	March 11, 2023

== See also ==
- China–Zambia relations
