= Feng Yujiu =

Chinese diplomat

Hao Deqing (Chinese: Chinese: 郝德青)

Ambassador of China to Hungary

Personal details
- Born: 1912 (age 113–114) Pingyao County, Shanxi, China
- Education: Peiping Normal University; Peiping University

Feng Yujiu (1912 -, Chinese: 冯于九) was a prominent Chinese diplomat and senior official. He served as the Chinese ambassador to Hungary, North Korea, Norway, the Netherlands, and Iran.

== Biography ==
He joined the Eighth Route Army in 1937 and became a member of the Chinese Communist Party in 1939. During the war years, he served as a councilor at the headquarters of the Eighth Route Army, deputy director of the Secretariat of the Government of the Jin–Ji–Lu–Yu Border Region, county magistrate of Piancheng County, deputy mayor of Handan, and director of the Secretariat of the Fiscal Affairs Office of the Border Region Government.

After the founding of the People’s Republic of China, he held several important posts, including deputy director of the Highway Administration of the Ministry of Transport, director of the General Office, assistant minister, and director of the Ocean Shipping Bureau. Later, he was Ambassador of the People's Republic of China to Norway (1965–1967), Mauritania (1969–1973), Nigeria (1973–1979) and Hungary (1979–1983).

Diplomatic posts
Preceded by Qin Lizhen	Ambassador of China to Norway; March 1965 – July 1967	Succeeded by Hao Deqing
Preceded by Lü Zhixian	Ambassador of China to Mauritania; July 1969 – March 1973	Succeeded by Wang Peng
Preceded by Yang Qiliang	Ambassador of China to Nigeria; November 1973 – January 1979	Succeeded by Lei Yang
Preceded by Liu Tiesheng	Ambassador of China to Hungary; April 1979 – January 1983	Succeeded by Ma Lie
