= Spokesperson of the Ministry of Foreign Affairs of China =

This article lists the 35 Spokespersons of the Ministry of Foreign Affairs of the People's Republic of China since 1976. The current spokespersons are Mao Ning, Lin Jian and Guo Jiakun.

== List of Spokespersons ==
This indicates the current spokespersons

	Name	Image	Year of birth	Term	Ref.
1	Qian Qichen		1928	1982	
2	Qi Huaiyuan		1930	1983–1984	
3	Yu Zhizhong			1984–1985	
4	Wang Zhenyu			1984–1985	
5	Ma Yuzhen		1934	1984–1988	
6	Li Zhaoxing		1940	1985–1990	
7	Li Jinhua		1932	1987–1991	
8	Jin Guihua		1935	1988–1991	
9	Duan Jin			1990–1993	
10	Wu Jianmin		1939	1990–1994	
11	Fan Huijuan		1935	1990–1993	
12	Li Jianying		1946	1991–1993	
13	Chen Jian		1942	1994–1996	
14	Shen Guofang		1952	1996–1998	
15	Cui Tiankai		1952	1996–1997	
16	Tang Guoqiang		1951	1996–1998	
17	Zhu Bangzao		1952	1998–2001	
18	Sun Yuxi		1951	1998–2002	
19	Zhang Qiyue		1959	1998–2004	
20	Kong Quan		1955	2001–2006	
21	Liu Jianchao		1964	2001–2009	
22	Qin Gang		1966	2005–2010; 2011-2014	
23	Jiang Yu		1964	2006–2012	
24	Ma Zhaoxu		1963	2009–2012	
25	Hong Lei		1969	2010–2016	
26	Liu Weimin		1968	2011–2012	
27	Qin Gang		1966	2011-2014	
28	Hua Chunying		1970	2012–2025	
29	Lu Kang		1968	2015–2019	
30	Geng Shuang		1973	2016–2020	
31	Zhao Lijian		1972	2020–2023	
32	Wang Wenbin		1971	2020–2024	
33	Mao Ning		1972	2022–present	
34	Lin Jian		1977	2024–present	
35	Guo Jiakun		1980	2025–present	
