= Zhang Longhai =

Chinese diplomat

Zhang Longhai (Chinese: 张龙海) was a Chinese diplomat. He was Ambassador of the People's Republic of China to New Zealand (1984–1987), and to Denmark and Iceland (1988–1991).

Preceded by Qin Lizhen	Chinese Ambassador to New Zealand; 1984–1987	Succeeded by Ni Zhengjian
Preceded by	Ambassador of China to Denmark and Iceland; 1988–1991	Succeeded by
