= Hao Deqing =

Diplomat for People's Republic of China

Hao Deqing 郝德青

President of the Chinese People's Institute of Foreign Affairs
- In office 1971–1983

Personal details
- Born: 1906 Pingyao County, Shanxi, China
- Died: 1993 (aged 86–87) Beijing, China
- Education: Peking Normal University; Peking University

Hao Deqing (Chinese: 郝德青, 1906–December 14, 1993) was a Chinese diplomat and senior official who served as ambassador to Hungary (1954–1961), North Korea (1961–1965), Norway (1971–1972), the Netherlands (1972–1974), and Iran (1974–1977). He also held key positions within the Chinese Communist Party and the central government, including First Secretary of the CCP Chengdu Municipal Committee, Deputy Director of the Foreign Affairs Office of the State Council, and President of the Chinese People's Institute of Foreign Affairs. He was elected a member of the Standing Committee of the 5th National People's Congress in 1978, and continued to serve as a representative, Standing Committee member, and member of the Foreign Affairs Committee during the 6th National People's Congress.

== Biography ==
Hao Deqing was born in 1906 in Pingyao County, Shanxi Province. He joined the Chinese Communist Party in 1928 while studying in Beiping, where he served as chairman of the student union and led protests against school authorities before being expelled. He subsequently studied at Peking Normal University and later enrolled in the Department of Political Science at Peking University. During this period, he served as secretary of the Party branch at the law school, secretary of the CCP Xicheng District Committee, and a member of the CCP Cultural Committee in Beiping, while also holding leadership roles in the Anti-Imperialist Alliance and the Municipal Federation of Social Organizations. He took part in editing the publication Northern Youth.

In 1930, Hao was arrested for participating in the August 1 demonstrations. After his release, he continued underground Party activities in Dai County, Yu County, Taiyuan, and Luoyang, working under the cover of a secondary school teacher. After the outbreak of the Second Sino-Japanese War, he served successively as county Party secretary in Jiexiu and Fenxi and later as political director of the 4th Regiment of the 2nd Juedou Column. During the 1939 Jinxi Incident, he helped organize and lead self-defense actions against local warlord forces. He later returned to the 4th Regiment as political commissar and directed a major reorganization effort within the unit.

In 1941, Hao became director of the Political Department of the 2nd Juedou Column and director of the Political Department of the Eighth Military Subdistrict. In 1943, he arrived in Yan'an to study at the Central Party School, where he attended lectures by Mao Zedong and other central leaders. After Japan's surrender, he returned to northwestern Shanxi, serving as principal of an experimental school and later as president of the Jin-Sui Daily.

In 1946, he became secretary-general of the CCP Jin-Sui Sub-bureau. After the founding of the People's Republic of China, Hao served as political secretary to He Long and secretary-general of the Northwest Sichuan Military and Political Committee. When the CCP Sichuan West Committee was established, he became a member of the Standing Committee and secretary-general, overseeing political and legal affairs, united front work, and foreign affairs. In 1951, he directed land-reform campaigns in Xindu, Jintang, and Huayang counties, and in early 1952 was appointed First Secretary of the CCP Chengdu Municipal Committee.

In 1954, Hao was transferred to diplomatic work and subsequently served as China's ambassador to Hungary, North Korea, Norway, the Netherlands, and Iran. During this period, he also worked for five years as Deputy Director of the Foreign Affairs Office of the State Council. From 1971 to 1983, he served as president of the Chinese People's Institute of Foreign Affairs. He was elected a member of the Standing Committee of the 5th National People's Congress in 1978, and was re-elected as a representative and Standing Committee member during the Sixth National People's Congress, serving concurrently as a member of its Foreign Affairs Committee.

Hao Deqing died in 1993.

Diplomatic posts
Preceded by Huang Zhen	People's Republic of China Ambassador to Hungary; 1954–1961	Succeeded by Chai Zemin
Preceded by Qiao Xiaoguang	People's Republic of China Ambassador to North Korea; 1961–1965	Succeeded by Jiao Ruoyu
Preceded by Feng Yujiu	People's Republic of China Ambassador to Norway; 1971–1972	Succeeded by Cao Chungeng
Preceded by new office	People's Republic of China Ambassador to the Netherlands; 1972–1974	Succeeded by Chen Xinren
Preceded by Chen Xinren	Chinese Ambassador to Iran; 1974–1977	Succeeded by Jiao Ruoyu
