= Wu Xi (diplomat) =

Chinese diplomat

Wu Xi (Chinese: 吴玺; pinyin: Wú Xǐ; born January 1968), a native of Ningbo, Zhejiang, is a female diplomat of the People's Republic of China.

== Biography ==
Wu Xi completed her studies at the China Foreign Affairs University. In 1990, she commenced her tenure at the Ministry of Foreign Affairs of the People's Republic of China (MFA), subsequently serving in the North American and Oceania Department, the Embassy in Iraq, and the Embassy in Australia. In 2007, she held the position of Counselor at the Embassy of the People's Republic of China in Australia. In 2010, she assumed the role of Counselor in the Department of the Ministry of Foreign Affairs of the People's Republic of China for North America and Oceania. In 2011, she ascended to the position of Deputy Director General of the Department of North America and Oceania.

In April 2018, she was appointed Ambassador of the People's Republic of China to New Zealand, as well as Ambassador to the Cook Islands and Niue. In November 2021, she vacated her position as Ambassador to New Zealand to assume the role of Director of the Department of Consular Affairs at the Ministry of Foreign Affairs. In April 2024, she was assigned as Deputy Director General of the Taiwan Affairs Office of the State Council of the People's Republic of China.

Diplomatic posts
| Preceded by Wang Lutong | Ambassador of the People's Republic of China to New Zealand, April 2018 - November 2021; With: Ambassador to the Cook Islands and Niue | Succeeded by Wang Xiaolong |
| Preceded by Cui Aiming | Director, Department of Consular Affairs at the Ministry of Foreign Affairs; 2021–2024 | Succeeded by Long Zhou |
