= He Xiangdong =

Chinese diplomat (born 1964)

- 何向东
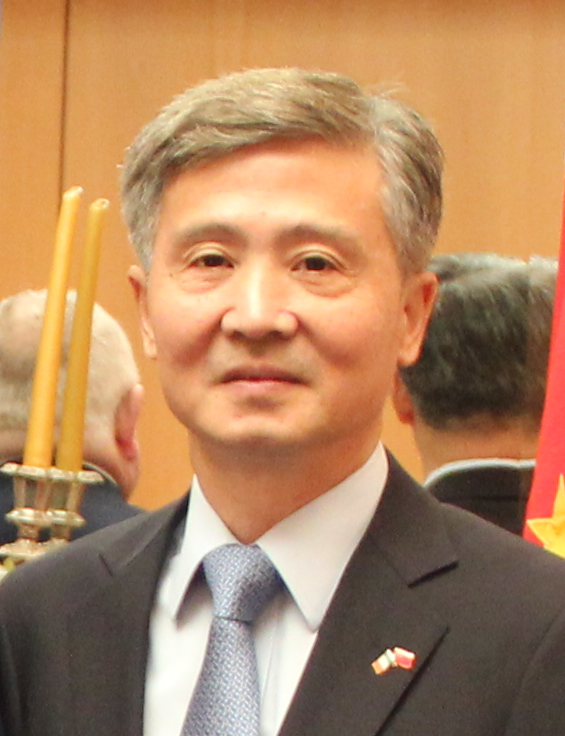
- He in 2024

Ambassador of China to Ireland
- In office May 2019 – October 2024
- Preceded by: Yue Xiaoyong
- Succeeded by: Zhao Xiyuan

Ambassador of China to South Sudan
- In office September 2016 – April 2019
- Preceded by: Ma Qiang
- Succeeded by: Hua Ning

Personal details
- Born: February 1964 (age 62) Hunan, China
- Party: Chinese Communist Party
- Education: Wuhan University; China Foreign Affairs University

Chinese name
- Traditional Chinese: 何向東
- Simplified Chinese: 何向东
Transcriptions
Standard Mandarin
- Hanyu Pinyin: Hé Xiàngdōng

He Xiangdong (Chinese: 何向东; born February 1964) is a Chinese diplomat who served as the Ambassador of China to Ireland from 2019 to 2024 and as Ambassador of China to South Sudan from 2016 to 2019.

== Biography ==
He Xiangdong was born in Hunan in February 1964, while his ancestral home in Wuyi County, Zhejiang. In September 1981, he entered Wuhan University, majoring in economics, where he graduated in July 1985.

After university, he worked as a journalist at World Knowledge. In September 1989, he was accepted to China Foreign Affairs University. After graduating in July 1991, he returned to his former work unit, the World Knowledge magazine. He was second secretary at Chinese Embassy in Oman from October 1994 to July 1996 and second secretary then first secretary at Chinese Embassy in Saudi Arabia from July 1996 to November 1999. He returned to China in November 1999, when he was appointed director and first secretary of the Political Research Department of the Ministry of Foreign Affairs. In June 2004, he was promoted to become counsellor of the Chinese Embassy in the United States, a position he held until August 2012. He became vice-mayor and member of the Standing Committee of the Lanzhou Municipal Committee of the Chinese Communist Party in March 2014, and served until September 2016.

He was granted his first ambassadorship as Chinese Ambassador to South Sudan in September 2016. He served from 2016 through 2019. He was appointed Chinese Ambassador to Ireland in May 2019 in succession to Yue Xiaoyong. He left the position in October 2024, and was succeeded by Zhao Xiyuan in November.

Diplomatic posts
Preceded by Ma Qiang	Chinese Ambassador to South Sudan; 2016–2019	Succeeded by Hua Ning (华宁)
Preceded by Yue Xiaoyong (岳晓勇)	Chinese Ambassador to Ireland; 2019–2024	Succeeded by Zhao Xiyuan (赵希源)
Incumbent
