= Li Qiangfen =

Chinese diplomat

Li Qiangfen (Chinese: 李强奋) (1917-?) was a Chinese diplomat. He was Ambassador of the People's Republic of China to South Yemen (1968–1972), Zambia (1972–1977) and East Germany (1982–1984).

Preceded by New office	Chinese Ambassador to Yemen (South Yemen); 1968–1972	Succeeded by
Preceded by Qin Lizhen	Ambassador of China to Zambia; 1972–1977	Succeeded by
Preceded by	Ambassador of China to East Germany; 1982–1984	Succeeded by
