= List of ambassadors of China to Malta =

Coordinates: 35.916175°N 14.489286°E

Chinese Ambassador to Malta
- Incumbent; Yu Dunhai since December 2020
- Inaugural holder: Hsu Shao-chang
- Formation: 25 April 1968; 58 years ago

The Chinese ambassador to Malta is the official representative of the People's Republic of China to the Republic of Malta.

== List of representatives ==
Diplomatic agrément/Diplomatic accreditation	Ambassador	Chinese language zh:中国驻马耳他大使列表	Observations	Premier of the Republic of China	List of prime ministers of Malta	Term end
April 25, 1968	Hsu Shao-chang	许绍昌	As ambassador to Italy he had his residence in Rome. On April 11, 1968 The Executive Yuan appoints Ambassador to Italy Hsu Shao-chang as concurrent ambassador to Malta.; From June 1963 to January 1968 he was Chinese Ambassador to Brazil in Rio de Janeiro.	Yen Chia-kan	George Borg Olivier	February 18, 1971
January 26, 1971	Chen Chin-Mai	zh:陈之迈	(*August 23, 1908 in Tianjin; † November 8, 1978): in 1928 he graduated from Tsinghua University.; During the Second Sino-Japanese War he was Counselor in the Ministry of Education.; In 1944 he was Minister Counselor in Washington.; In 1955 he became ambassador in Manila, (Philippines).; In 1959 he became ambassador in Canberra (Australia) and New Zealand.; In 1968 he was ambassador in Tokyo (Japan).; In 1969 he became ambassador to the Holy See.; In 1971 he became ambassador in Valletta (Malta).	Yen Chia-kan	George Borg Olivier	February 24, 1972
Diplomatic agrément/Diplomatic accreditation	Ambassador	Chinese language zh:中国驻马耳他大使列表	Observations	Premier of the People's Republic of China	List of prime ministers of Malta	Term end
January 31, 1972			The governments in Valletta and Beijing established diplomatic relations.	Zhou Enlai	George Borg Olivier	
June 1972	Liu Pu	zh:刘溥 (外交官)	From June 1972 to May 1977 he was ambassador of the People's Republic of China to Malta. *From August 1977 to December 1980 he was ambassador in Mexico. *From June 1981 – January 1985 Ambassador of the People's Republic of China to Liberia	Zhou Enlai	Dom Mintoff	May 1977
July 1977	Cheng Zhiping	程之平		Hua Guofeng	Dom Mintoff	February 1983
May 1983	Hua Renqin	华人琴		Zhao Ziyang	Dom Mintoff	October 1986
November 1986	Guo Jiading	zh:过家鼎	From November 1986 to September 1989 he was ambassador in La Valette (Malta).; From August 1989 to January 1993 he was ambassador to Lisbon (Portugal).	Zhao Ziyang	Karmenu Mifsud Bonnici	September 1989
September 1989	Mei Ping	梅平		Li Peng	Eddie Fenech Adami	August 1992
September 1992	Yin Yufu	zh:尹玉福	From September 1989 to August 1992 he was ambassador to La Valletta (Malta).; From April 1998 to March 2005 he was ambassador in Ottawa (Canada).	Li Peng	Eddie Fenech Adami	April 1995
May 1995	Yu Wuzhen	zh:于武真	From May 1995 to February 1998 he was ambassador in La Valletta (Malta).; From October 1998 to October 2001 he was ambassador to Sierra Leone.	Li Peng	Eddie Fenech Adami	February 1998
March 1998	Zu Qinshun	祖钦舜		Zhu Rongji	Alfred Sant	June 2000
July 2000	Yang Guirong	zh:杨桂荣	From March 1985 to May 1987 he was ambassador to Madagascar.; From August 1993 to February 1997 he was ambassador in Stockholm (Sweden).; From July 2000 to August 2003 he was ambassador in La Valletta Malta.	Zhu Rongji	Eddie Fenech Adami	August 2003
September 2003	Liu Zhengxiu	刘正修		Wen Jiabao	Eddie Fenech Adami	March 2007
April 2007	Chai Xi	柴玺		Wen Jiabao	Lawrence Gonzi	July 2009
August 2009	Zhang Keyuan	zh:张克远	From October 2003 to March 2007 he was ambassador to Dhaka (Bangladesh).; From April 2007 to July 2009 he was ambassador in La Valletta (Malta).; From July 2010 to January 2014 he was ambassador in Kuala Lumpur (Malaysia).	Wen Jiabao	Lawrence Gonzi	March 2012
March 2012	Cai Jinbiao (PRC diplomat)	蔡金彪		Wen Jiabao	Lawrence Gonzi	
July 2016	Jiang Jiang	zh:姜江	(* May 1965): From April 2013 to May 2016 he was ambassador in Beirut (Lebanon).	Li Keqiang	Joseph Muscat	November 2020
December 2020	Yu Dunhai	于敦海	(* September 1973): From 2010 to 2016, he served as second secretary, first secretary and counselor at the Embassy of China in the United States. From 2018 to 2020, he served as the Deputy Director of the Information Department of the Ministry of Foreign Affairs	Li Keqiang; Li Qiang	Joseph Muscat; Robert Abela	
