= Li Zhiguo =

Chinese diplomat

- 李志国

Chinese Ambassador to Libya
- In office July 2013 – July 2017
- Preceded by: Wang Wangsheng
- Succeeded by: Wang Qimin (acting)

1st Chinese Ambassador to South Sudan
- In office September 2011 – July 2013
- Preceded by: New title
- Succeeded by: Ma Qiang

Chinese Ambassador to Bahrain
- In office February 2006 – 2009
- Preceded by: Wu Congyong
- Succeeded by: Yang Weiguo

Personal details
- Born: October 1956 (age 69–70) Heilongjiang, China
- Party: Chinese Communist Party
- Education: Beijing Foreign Studies University

Li Zhiguo (simplified Chinese: 李志国; traditional Chinese: 李志國; pinyin: Lǐ Zhìguó; born October 1956) is a Chinese diplomat and the Chinese ambassador to Libya.

== Life and career ==
Li was born in Suiling County, Heilongjiang, in October 1956. He graduated from Beijing Foreign Studies University in 1978, majoring in Arabic language. He became employed by the Ministry of Foreign Affairs in 1978.

From 1997 to 2001 he was China's consulate general in Dubai.

In February 2006 he became the Chinese Ambassador to Bahrain, a position he held until 2009.

He was China's consulate general in Juba in November 2010, and held that office until August 2011.

In September 2011, he was appointed the Chinese Ambassador to South Sudan by Chinese president Hu Jintao, he remained in that position until July 2013, when he was transferred to Tripoli, capital of Libya, and appointed the Chinese Ambassador. He supervised the Tripoli-based Chinese embassy's termination of operations in July 2014.

Diplomatic posts
Preceded by Wu Congyong	Chinese Ambassador to Bahrain; 2006–2009	Succeeded by Yang Weiguo
New title	1st Chinese Ambassador to South Sudan; 2011–2013	Succeeded by Ma Qiang
Preceded by Wang Wangsheng	Chinese Ambassador to Libya; 2013–2017	Succeeded by Wang Qimin (acting)
