= Gui Congyou =

Chinese diplomat

- 桂从友
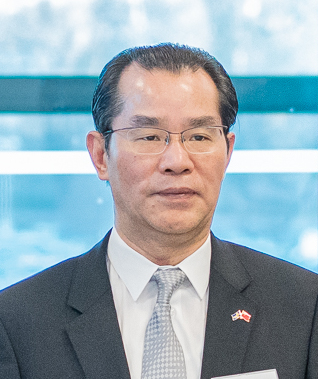

Chinese Ambassador to Sweden
- In office August 2017 – September 2021
- Succeeded by: Cui Aimin
- Minister: Wang Yi

Personal details
- Party: Chinese Communist Party

Gui Congyou (Chinese: 桂从友; born 1965) is a Chinese diplomat who served as the Chinese Ambassador to Sweden until his resignation in September 2021.

== Biography ==
Gui was born in May 1965. From 1991 to 1994 he worked in the Policy Research Office of the Central Committee of the Chinese Communist Party. From 1994 to 1997 he worked at the Chinese Embassy in the Russian Federation. From 1997 to 2003 he worked in the Ministry of Foreign Affairs' Department of European-Central Asian Affairs. From 2003 to 2009 he again worked in the Chinese Embassy in Moscow. From 2009 to 2017 he returned to the Department of European-Central Asian Affairs.

== Ambassadorship ==
Gui was appointed Ambassador Extraordinary and Plenipotentiary of the People's Republic of China to the Kingdom of Sweden in 2017.

In November 2019, Gui threatened Sweden during an interview with broadcaster Swedish PEN saying that “We treat our friends with fine wine, but for our enemies we got shotguns” over the decision to award Gui Minhai with the Tucholsky Prize. All eight major Swedish political parties have condemned the Ambassador's threats. On December 4 after the prize had been awarded, Ambassador Gui said that one could not both harm China's interests and benefit economically from China. When asked to clarify his remarks he said that China would impose trade restrictions on Sweden, these remarks were backed up by the Chinese Foreign Ministry in Beijing. The embassy has systematically worked to influence the reporting on China by Swedish journalists.

In April 2021, it was revealed that the Chinese embassy threatened a journalist working for the newspaper Expressen. Several political parties publicly expressed that they believe the ambassador should be declared persona non grata and deported. The reason given was that the Chinese embassy, during his time as ambassador, consistently ignores the Swedish constitution by threatening and attempting to influence journalists to not be critical of China.

Within Gui's first two years of the ambassadorship, Sweden's Foreign Ministry summoned him over forty times to protest Gui's remarks.

== See also ==
- List of ambassadors of China to Sweden
- Wolf warrior diplomacy
