= Qin Lizhen =

Chinese diplomat

Qin Lizhen (Chinese: 秦力真; 1914–2007) was a Chinese diplomat. He served as the Chinese Ambassador to Norway between 1962 and 1965, Chinese Ambassador to Zambia between 1965 and 1972, Chinese Ambassador to Sweden between 1974 and 1979, and Chinese Ambassador to New Zealand between 1979 and 1983.

Preceded by Xu Yixin	Chinese Ambassador to Norway; 1962–1965	Succeeded by Feng Yujiu
New title	Chinese Ambassador to Zambia; 1965–1972	Succeeded by Li Qiangfen
Preceded by Wang Luming	Chinese Ambassador to Sweden; 1974–1979	Succeeded by Cao Keqiang
Preceded by Pei Jianzhang	Chinese Ambassador to New Zealand; 1979–1983	Succeeded by Zhang Longhai
