= Guo Jiakun =

Chinese diplomat (born 1980)

- 郭嘉昆
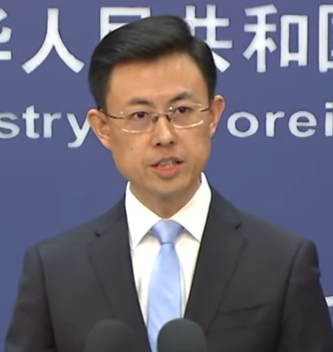
- Guo in 2025

35th Spokesperson of the Ministry of Foreign Affairs of China
- Incumbent
- Assumed office 6 January 2025

Personal details
- Born: August 1980 (age 46)
- Party: Chinese Communist Party
- Education: Nankai University (BA)
- Occupation: Diplomat

Guo Jiakun (Chinese: 郭嘉昆; pinyin: Guō Jiākūn; born August 1980) is a Chinese diplomat, currently serving as the 35th spokesperson of the Ministry of Foreign Affairs of China since 6 January 2025. He joined the foreign service of China right after he graduated from college in 2002.

== Biography ==
Guo Jiakun graduated from Nankai University in Tianjin in 2002 with a bachelor's degree in foreign languages, with a concentration in English. He joined the Ministry of Foreign Affairs (MFA) of China after his graduation. He served as third secretary of the Permanent Mission of the People's Republic of China to the United Nations, as deputy director of the Fourth Division of the MFA Department of African Affairs, and as director of the MFA Policy Planning Department.

=== MFA spokesperson ===
On 6 January 2025, Guo Jiakun was appointed as the 35th spokesperson of the Ministry of Foreign Affairs and conducted a regular press conference on the same day.

==== US TikTok ban ====
In January 2025, as TikTok restrictions were due and American users migrated to Chinese social media app RedNote, Guo responded to the question of Chinese censorship and replied that "no matter what platforms you use, it's a personal choice." He further added that the Chinese government encourages and supports "people-to-people exchanges". After President Donald Trump signed an executive action to delay the ban on TikTok for 75 days, he stated in a press briefing that the U.S. should listen "to the voice of reason" and "provide an open, fair, just and non-discriminatory business environment" for companies from all countries.

==== Philippines ====
In September 2025, Guo called on the Philippines for their "wrongful and provocative" actions on Taiwan while undermining China's "core interests". He noted that Philippine Defense Secretary Gilbert Teodoro and numerous Filipino officials have kept "trampling on China's red line." In August, a Taiwanese delegate had visited the Philippines. He warned that such actions would "backfire" on the country. He also cautioned the Philippines to avoid being used as "chess pieces" in regional power struggles, describing the Philippines' military cooperation with the United States.

== See also ==
- List of spokespersons of the Ministry of Foreign Affairs of China
