= List of ambassadors of China to Ireland =

The ambassador of China to Ireland is the official representative of the People's Republic of China to Ireland.

== List of representatives ==
Name (English)	Name (Chinese)	Tenure begins	Tenure ends	Note
Li Tianmin	李天民	April 1980	August 1980	Charge d'affaires preparing for opening.
Gong Pusheng	龚普生	August 1980	September 1984	
Xing Zhongxiu	邢忠修	September 1984	August 1987	
Zhou Yang	周阳	September 1987	October 1989	
Han Lili	韩琍琍	November 1989	October 1993	
Fan Huijuan	范慧娟	December 1993	November 1997	
Zheng Jintong	郑锦炯	December 1997	February 2000	
Zhang Xiaokang	张小康	March 2000	July 2002	
Sha Hailin	沙海林	August 2002	December 2005	
Zhang Xinsen	张鑫森	December 2005	October 2007	
Liu Biwei	刘碧伟	December 2007	August 2011	
Luo Linquan	罗林泉	August 2011	March 2014	
Xu Jianguo	徐建国	March 2014	31 May 2016	
Qiu Xiaoyong	岳晓勇	June 2016	April 2019	
He Xiangdong	何向东	May 2019	October 2024	
Zhao Xiyuan	赵希源	November 2024		

== See also ==
- China–Ireland relations
