= Fu Xiaotian =

Chinese journalist (born 1983)

Fu Xiaotian OSI
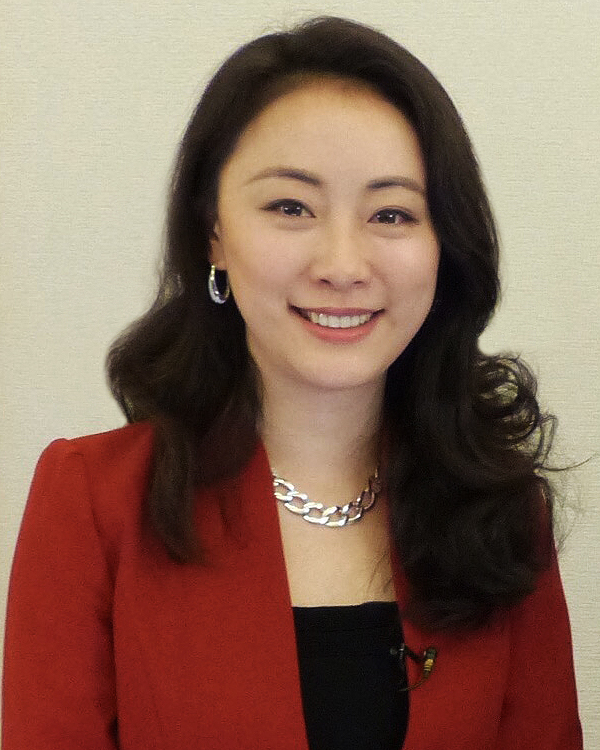
- Fu Xiaotian in 2019
- Born: 12 June 1983 (age 43); Chongqing, China
- Disappeared: June 2023
- Citizenship: Chinese (Hong Kong)
- Education: Beijing Language and Culture University; Peking University; University of Cambridge
- Occupations: Journalist, TV Host and Producer
- Years active: 2009-2023
- Television: Talk with World Leaders
- Website: fuxiaotian.com (Archived 10 January 2022 at the Wayback Machine)

Fu Xiaotian (simplified Chinese: 傅晓田; traditional Chinese: 傅曉田; pinyin: Fù Xiǎotián, born 12 June 1983) is a Chinese news correspondent. Fu joined Phoenix Television’s London bureau in 2009 and gained prominence for her wartime reporting from Libya in 2011. After her transfer to Phoenix TV's Hong Kong headquarters, she became known as the host of Talk with World Leaders.

In June 2023, she disappeared.

== Early life ==
Fu was born in Chongqing, China, to an engineer and a housewife. Her grandparents enlisted in the Chinese Red Army before settling in Chongqing. She received a bachelor's degree from Beijing Language and Culture University and another from Peking University. She received a master's degree in education from Churchill College, Cambridge, in 2007.

== Talk with World Leaders ==
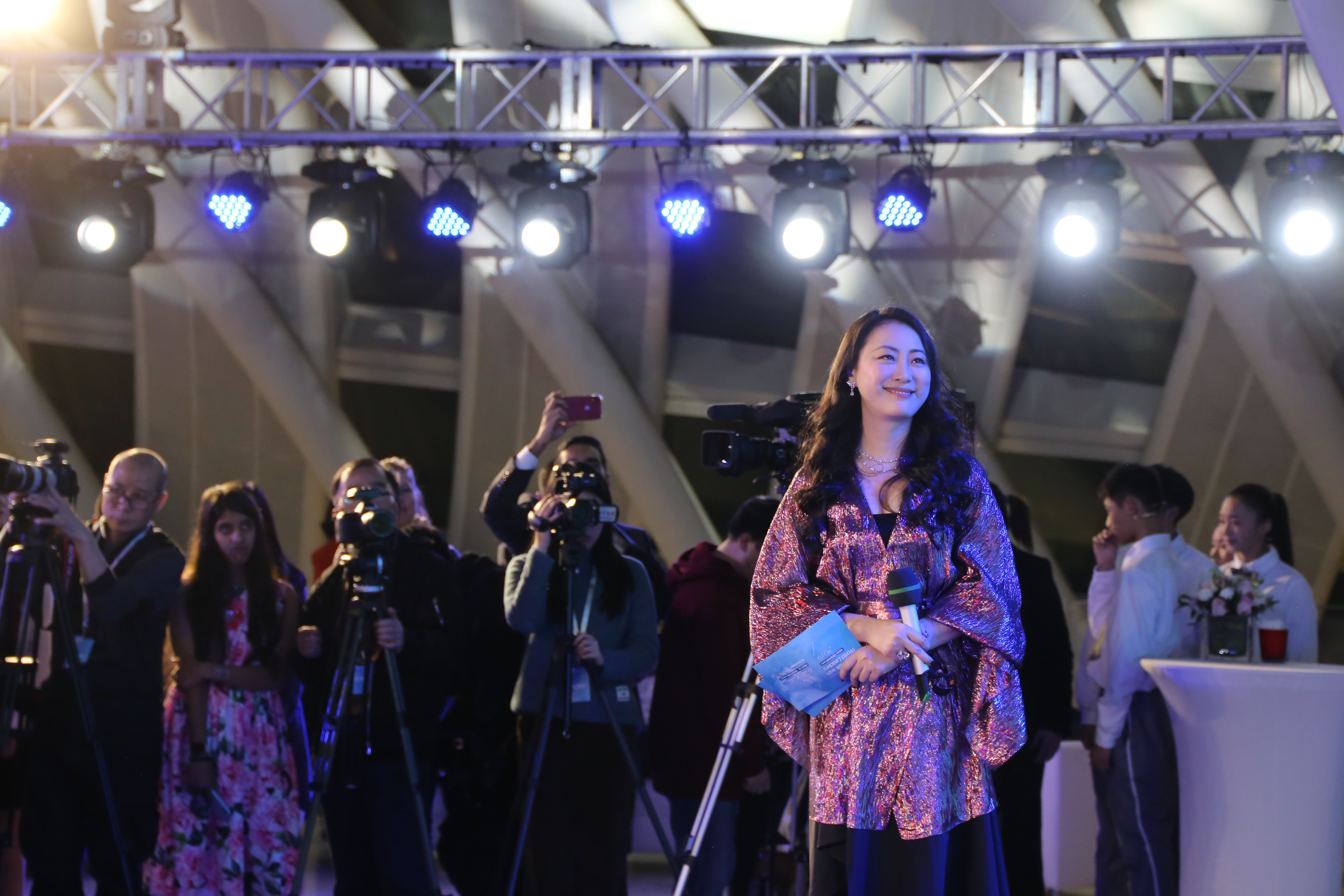
Fu at Meet with World Leaders book launching event

Talk with World Leaders is a one-on-one interview program on Phoenix TV, aiming to provide a platform for international leaders to communicate their views directly to Chinese audiences. The 32-minute program broadcasts worldwide on Phoenix Chinese Channel, Phoenix North American Channel, Phoenix European Channel, as well as Phoenix Hong Kong Channel on a weekly basis.

Fu headed the program from 2014 to 2022. Her final interview in the Talk with World Leaders series was in March 2022 with Chinese diplomat Qin Gang, who at the time was Chinese ambassador to the United States.

== Awards and recognition ==
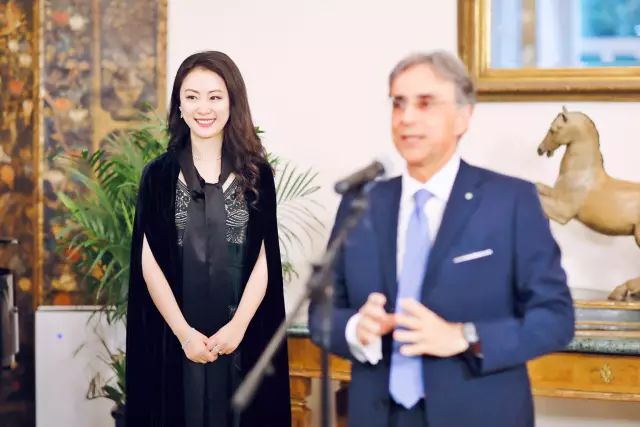
Fu at the knighting ceremony

Fu was knighted with the Order of Stella d'Italia (Star of Italy) by President Sergio Mattarella of Italy in 2017. Italy's Ambassador to China at the time, Ettore Sequi, delivered a speech at the ceremony.

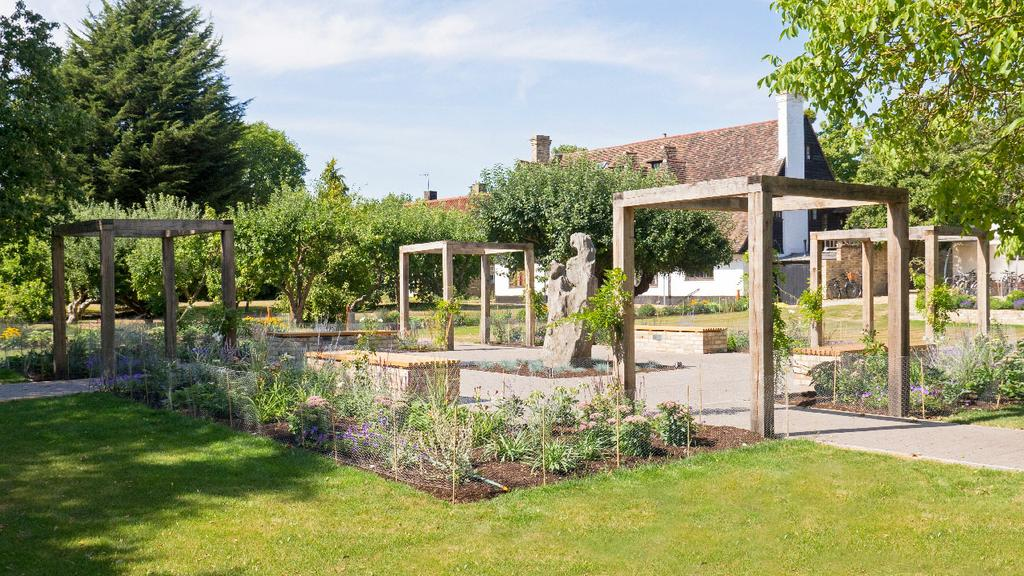
The Xiaotian Fu Garden in Churchill College, University of Cambridge

In 2016, her alma mater, Churchill College at the University of Cambridge, named the Xiaotian Fu Garden in recognition of her £250,000 contribution to support education, learning and research.

== Disappearance ==
In July 2023, China's foreign minister Qin Gang disappeared amid speculation over an alleged affair with Fu. Around the same time, Fu also disappeared from public view. A 26 September article by the Financial Times claims Fu was in a relationship with Qin, citing unnamed sources. According to the article, Qin and Fu met in London in 2010, when both were in the UK, and they developed a closer relationship nearly a decade later in Beijing. It also mentioned that Fu had a child with the help of a surrogate mother in the US. It mentioned that Qin began to limit contact with Fu after his appointment as foreign minister, prompting Fu to drop hints about their relationship on social media.

== Personal life ==
Fu has a son whom she calls "Er-Kin," delivered via surrogacy in the United States.

== Publications ==
- Talk with World Leaders on China (世界政要谈中国：晓田访谈录) ISBN 978-7-5085-3675-0 (2017)
- Meeting World Leaders (风云之交) ISBN 978-7-5146-1780-1 (2020)
