= Hong Lei (diplomat) =

Chinese diplomat and politician

- 洪磊
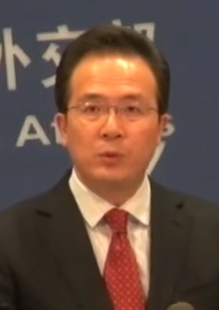
- Hong in 2016

Assistant Minister of Foreign Affairs
- Incumbent
- Assumed office October 2024
- Minister: Wang Yi

Director-General of the Protocol Department of the Ministry of Foreign Affairs
- Incumbent
- Assumed office February 2019
- Preceded by: Qin Gang

Chinese Consul-General to Chicago
- In office 22 July 2016 – 28 August 2018
- Preceded by: Zhao Weiping
- Succeeded by: Liu Jun

Deputy Director of the Information Department of the Ministry of Foreign Affairs
- In office November 2010 – July 2016
- Preceded by: Qin Gang
- Succeeded by: Hua Chunying

Personal details
- Born: August 1969 (age 57) Fuyang, Zhejiang, China
- Party: Chinese Communist Party
- Education: Beijing Language and Culture University

Hong Lei (Chinese: 洪磊; pinyin: Hóng Leǐ; born August 1969) is a Chinese diplomat and politician, serving as Director-General of the Department of Protocol, Ministry of Foreign Affairs. He was Chinese Consul General in Chicago from 2016 to 2018 and served as spokesperson for the Ministry of Foreign Affairs from 2010 to 2016. Hong was the 25th spokesperson since the spokesperson system was established in the ministry in 1983. He is currently serving as Director-General of the Protocol Department since 2019 and Assistant Minister of the Ministry of Foreign Affairs since 2024.

== Biography ==
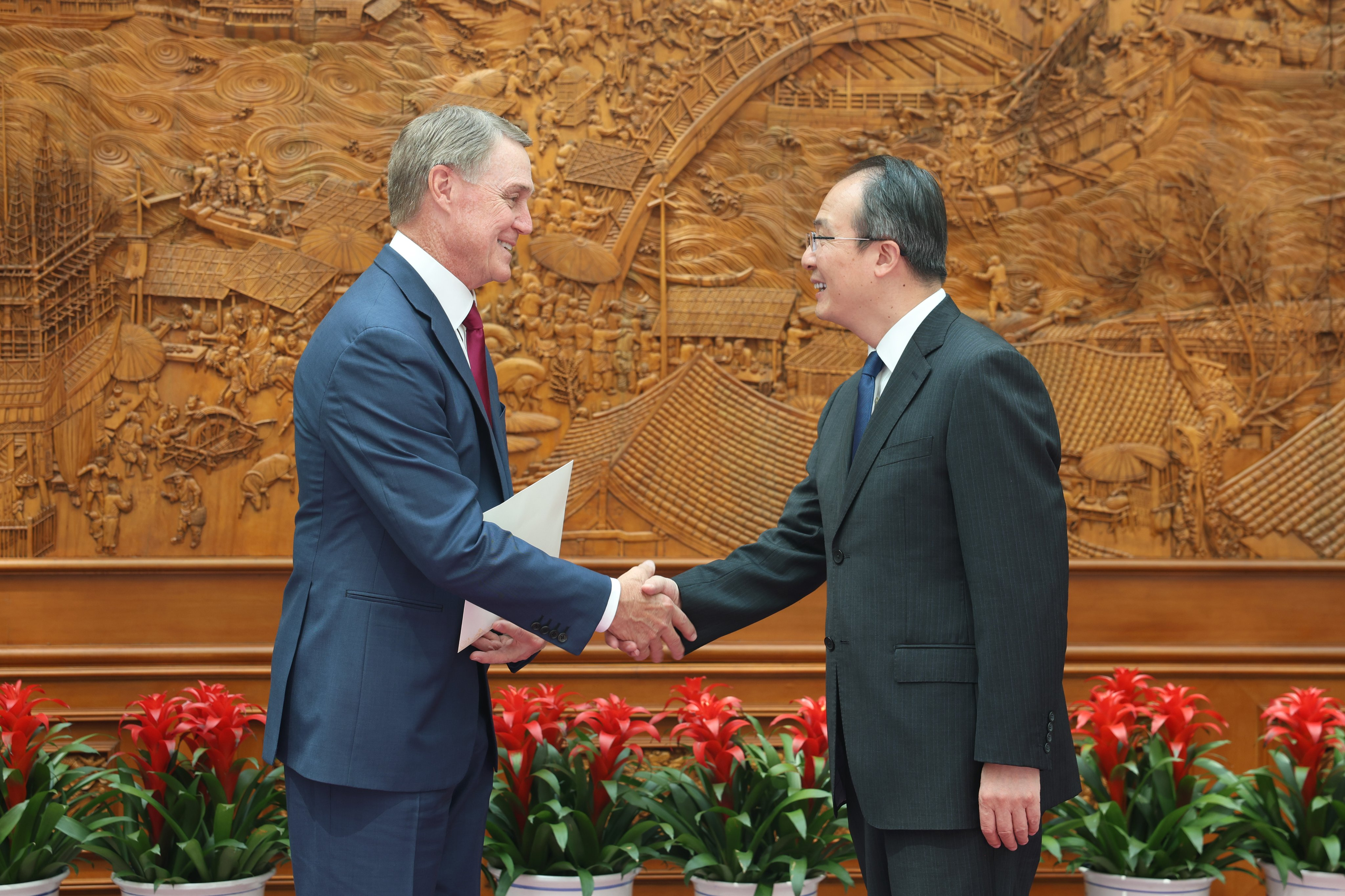
Hong (right) with US Ambassador to China David Perdue, May 2025

A native of Fuyang, Zhejiang, Hong Lei graduated from Beijing Language and Culture University in 1991. After college, he was appointed as an official in the Ministry of Foreign Affairs, and worked in the Information Department and served abroad at the Chinese embassy in the Netherlands and the consulate general in San Francisco. From 2010 to 2016, he held the post of Deputy Director‑General of the Information Department and was spokesman for the Ministry of Foreign Affairs—the 25th in this role.

He was appointed Consul General of China in Chicago in 2016, serving until 2018. That year, he returned to take up leadership in the Protocol Department, becoming Deputy Director‑General and then Director‑General in 2019. In 2023, the Taliban's foreign ministry announced that Hong had accepted their ambassador's credentials. China became the first country to host a Taliban ambassador since the Taliban took power in Afghanistan in 2021. Hong noted this as an important step between the relations of China and Afghanistan.

In October 2024, he was appointed Assistant Minister of Foreign Affairs.

== Official statements ==
=== Human rights and censorship ===
After US concerns over Chinese government crackdown on dissent in 2011, Hong, as MFA spokesman, urged the United States to stop interfering with other countries' affairs and "to reflect on its own human rights issues." In May 2012, he referred to the Chen Guangcheng case in a news briefing stating that the "US side should draw a lesson from the relevant incident with a responsible attitude" and "take necessary measures to prevent similar incidents." When asked if Chen should return to China after his escape to the US, Hong replied that he should abide to Chinese laws and regulations due to him being a Chinese citizen.

In 2013, he commented that "relevant media should tell right from wrong" after 140,000 Chinese web users voted in an online petition to ban CNN in China.

=== South China Sea dispute ===
In February 2013, Hong rejected the Philippines' attempt to take China for international arbitration regarding the South China Sea. He urged the Philippines to increase their "education and indoctrination" of Filipino fisherman regarding the disputed area after an incident involving three Filipino fishing boats in Scarborough Shoal in January 2015. Hong defended the actions made by China's coast guard saying that it is in "accordance with the law".

Government offices
Preceded by Qin Gang	Spokesperson for the Ministry of Foreign Affairs of the People's Republic of China; 2010–2016	Succeeded by Hua Chunying
Preceded by Qin Gang	Head of the Department of Protocol, Ministry of Foreign Affairs; 2019	Incumbent
Diplomatic posts
Preceded by Zhao Weijun	Consul General of the people's Republic of China in Chicago; 2016–2018	Succeeded by Liu Jun
