= Dong Yueqian =

Chinese diplomat

Dong Yueqian (Chinese: 董越千) (1914–1978) was a Chinese diplomat. He was Ambassador of the People's Republic of China to Sweden (1959–1964).

Preceded by Han Nianlong	Ambassador of China to Sweden; 1959–1964	Succeeded by Yang Bozhen
