= Qin Gang =

Chinese diplomat (born 1966)

- 秦刚
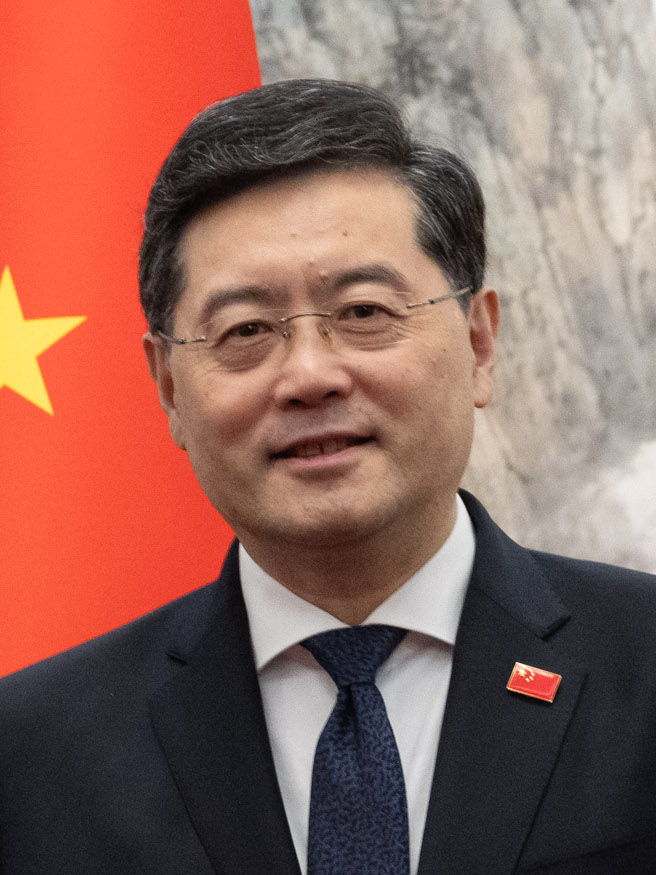
- Qin in 2023

State Councilor of China
- In office 12 March 2023 – 24 October 2023 Serving with Li Shangfu, Wang Xiaohong, Wu Zhenglong, Shen Yiqin
- Premier: Li Qiang

Minister of Foreign Affairs
- In office 30 December 2022 – 25 July 2023
- Premier: Li Keqiang; Li Qiang
- Preceded by: Wang Yi
- Succeeded by: Wang Yi

Chinese Ambassador to the United States
- In office 27 July 2021 – 5 January 2023
- Preceded by: Cui Tiankai
- Succeeded by: Xie Feng

Vice Minister of Foreign Affairs
- In office 7 September 2018 – 27 July 2021 Serving with Zheng Zeguang, Ma Zhaoxu, Luo Zhaohui
- Minister: Wang Yi
- Preceded by: Li Baodong
- Succeeded by: Deng Li

Director of the Protocol Department of the Ministry of Foreign Affairs
- In office 2 January 2015 – 7 September 2018
- Preceded by: Zhang Kunsheng
- Succeeded by: Hong Lei

Director of the Information Department of the Ministry of Foreign Affairs
- In office December 2011 – January 2015
- Preceded by: Ma Zhaoxu
- Succeeded by: Liu Jianchao

Personal details
- Born: 19 March 1966 (age 60) Tianjin, Hebei, China (now Tianjin, China)
- Party: Chinese Communist Party (1988–present)
- Spouse: Lin Yan
- Children: 2
- Education: University of International Relations (LLB)
- Cabinet: Li Qiang Government

Chinese name
- Simplified Chinese: 秦刚
- Traditional Chinese: 秦剛
Transcriptions
Standard Mandarin
- Hanyu Pinyin: Qín Gāng

Qin Gang (Note: Chinese: 秦刚; pinyin: Qín Gāng) (born 19 March 1966) is a Chinese former diplomat and politician who served as the 12th minister of foreign affairs from December 2022 to July 2023 and as State Councillor from March to October 2023.

Qin previously served as Ambassador of China to the United States from 2021 to 2023, vice minister of foreign affairs of China from 2018 to 2021, director of protocol at the Ministry of Foreign Affairs from 2015 to 2018, and director of information at Ministry of Foreign Affairs from 2011 to 2015. He disappeared from public view in June 2023 and was removed from the post of Minister of Foreign Affairs on 25 July 2023. According to The Washington Post, Qin had been demoted to a position at an MFA-affiliated publishing house as of September 2024.

== Early life and education ==
Qin Gang was born in Tianjin, China on 19 March 1966.

Qin received a Bachelor of Law with a major in international politics from the University of International Relations in 1988.

== Early career ==
After his graduation from college, Qin worked as a staff member at the Beijing Service Bureau for Diplomatic Missions. In 1992, he entered China's Ministry of Foreign Affairs as attaché and Third Secretary at the Department of West European Affairs. Later, he worked at the Chinese Embassy in the United Kingdom as Secretary and Counselor from 1995 to 2005, and worked at the Ministry of Foreign Affairs Information Department as the Deputy Director-General and spokesman from 2005 to 2010.

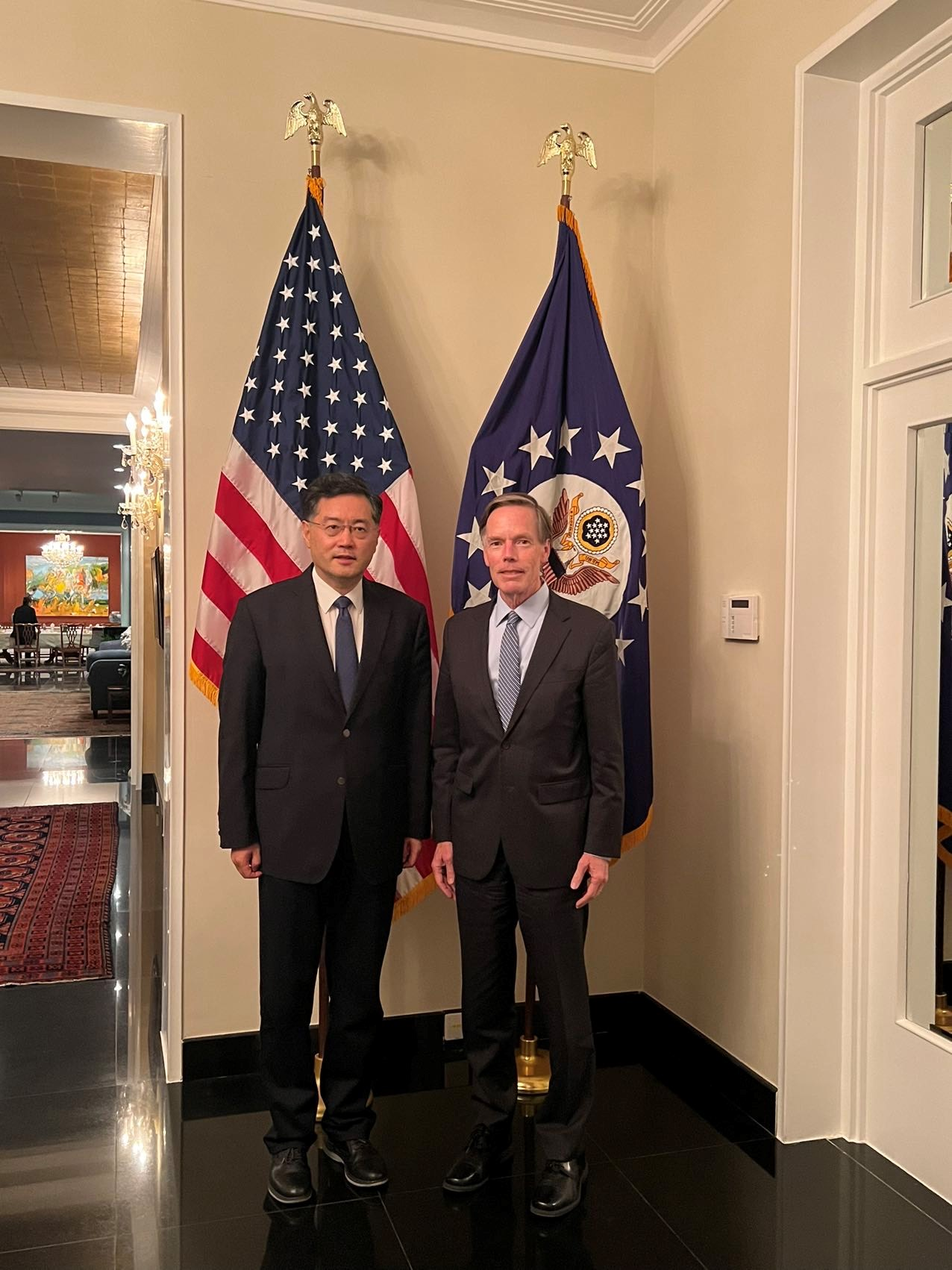
U.S. Ambassador to China Nicholas Burns meeting with Chinese Ambassador to the U.S. Qin Gang, before Qin's departure for the U.S.

In September 2010, Qin was appointed as the Envoy of the People's Republic of China to the United Kingdom. In December 2011, he returned to Beijing to serve as the director general of the Foreign Ministry Information Department. From 2014 to 2017, Qin served as the Director General of the Foreign Ministry Protocol Department. He became Assistant Minister of Foreign Affairs of China in 2017 and Vice Minister of Foreign Affairs of China in September 2018.

== Ambassador to the United States ==
In July 2021, Qin became the 11th Ambassador of the People's Republic of China to the United States, succeeding Cui Tiankai, pursuant to a National People's Congress Standing Committee decision.

On 22 September 2021, Qin advocated the CCP General Secretary Xi Jinping's concept of whole-process people's democracy at a conference organized by U.S. think tanks the Carter Center and The George H. W. Bush Foundation for US-China Relations, stating, "Isn't it obvious that both China's people-center philosophy and President Lincoln's 'of the people, by the people, for the people' are for the sake of the people? [...] Shall we understand China's socialist whole-process democracy as this: from the people, to the people, with the people, for the people?"

In January 2022, in an interview with NPR, Qin called allegations of Uyghur genocide "fabrications, lies, and disinformation."

In April 2022, a special question and answer (Q&A) session between the three taikonauts of Shenzhou 13 aboard the Tiangong space station and American students was held in the Chinese Embassy in the United States, Washington, D.C. Qin served as the official host of the event.

In August 2022, Qin called the 2022 visit by Nancy Pelosi to Taiwan a "farce" and a "total political provocation."

== Minister of Foreign Affairs ==
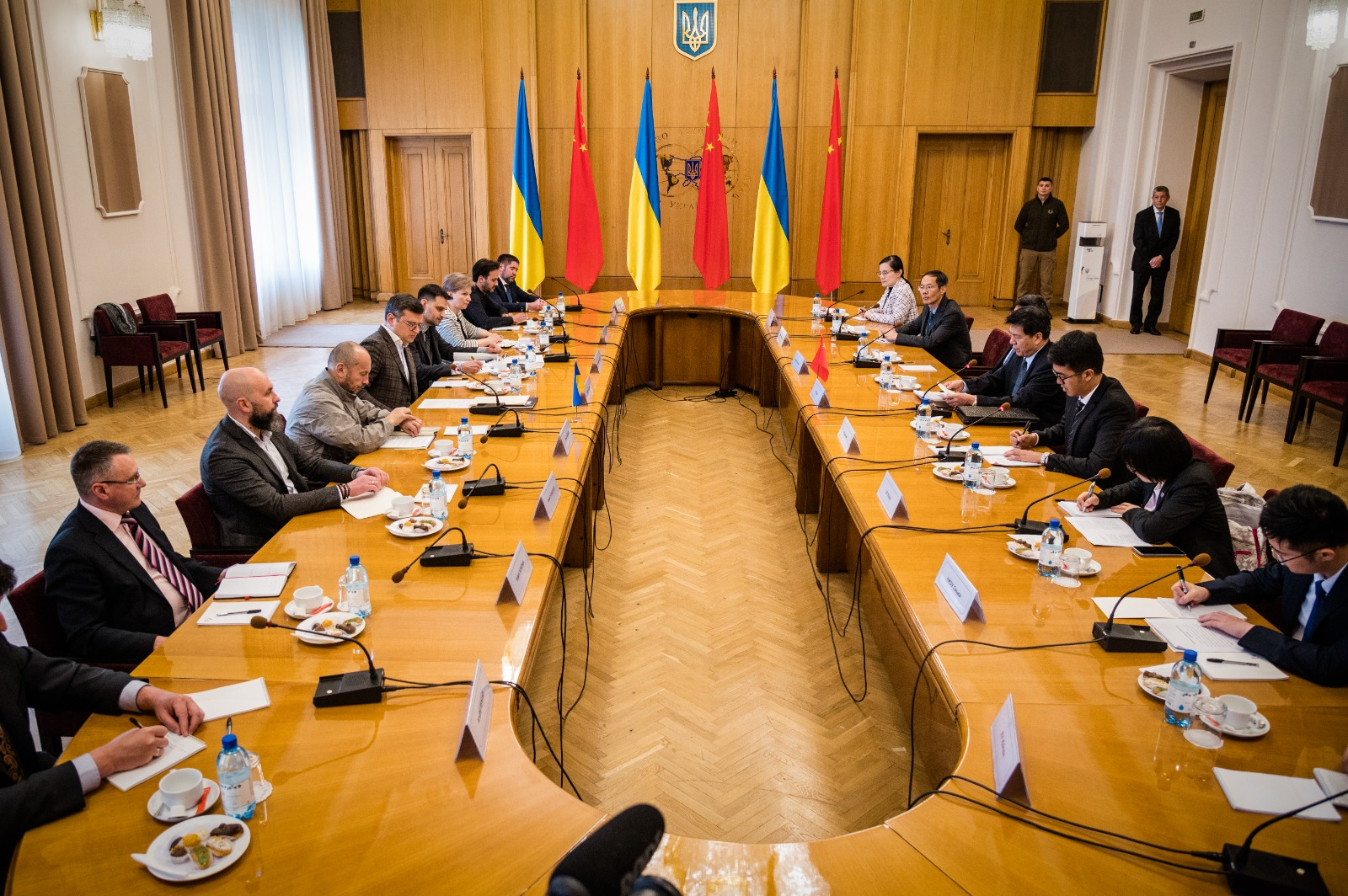
Qin was reportedly the person responsible for sending Chinese diplomat Li Hui to Ukraine, against Russia's wishes.

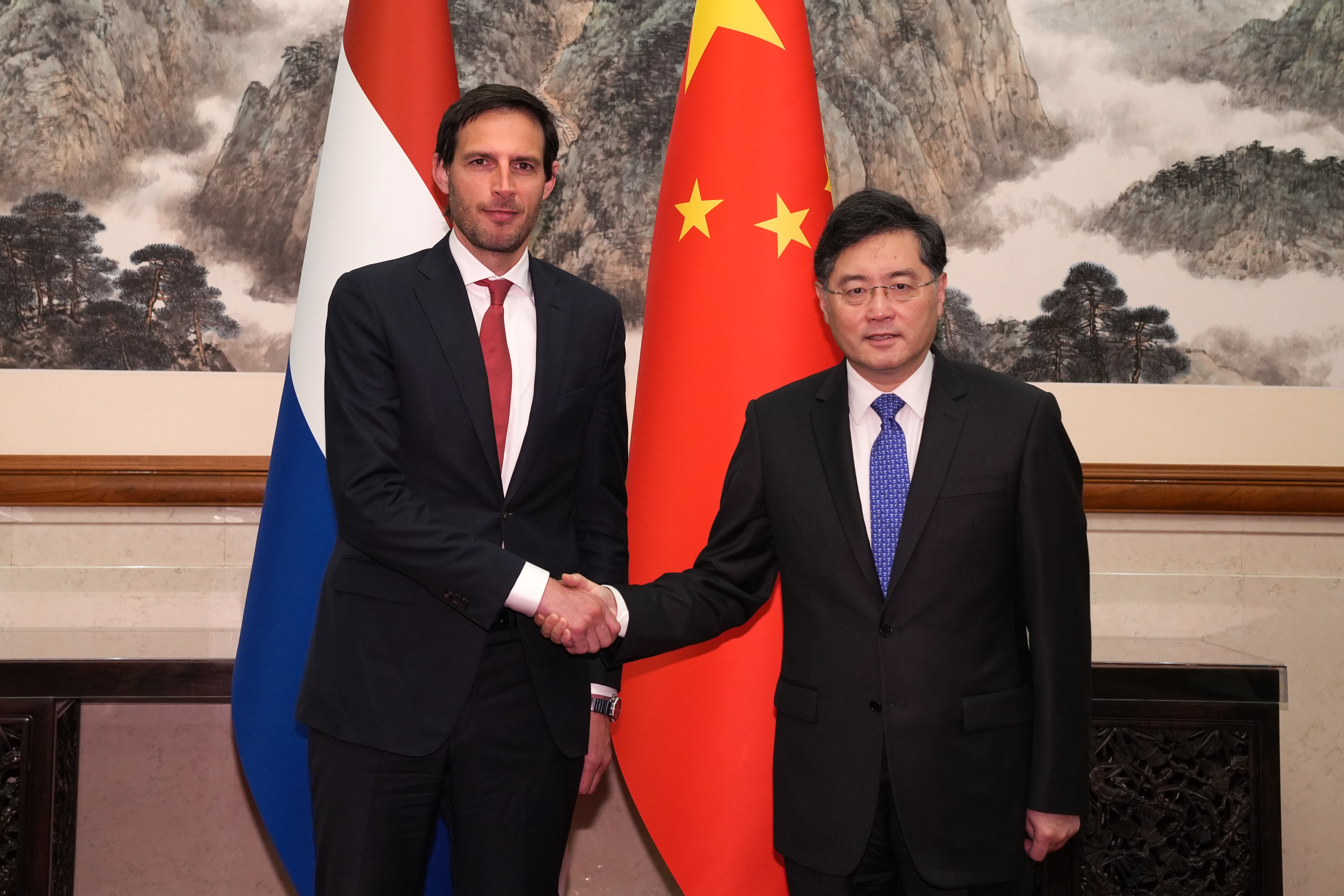
Qin with Dutch Foreign Minister Wopke Hoekstra, 23 May 2023

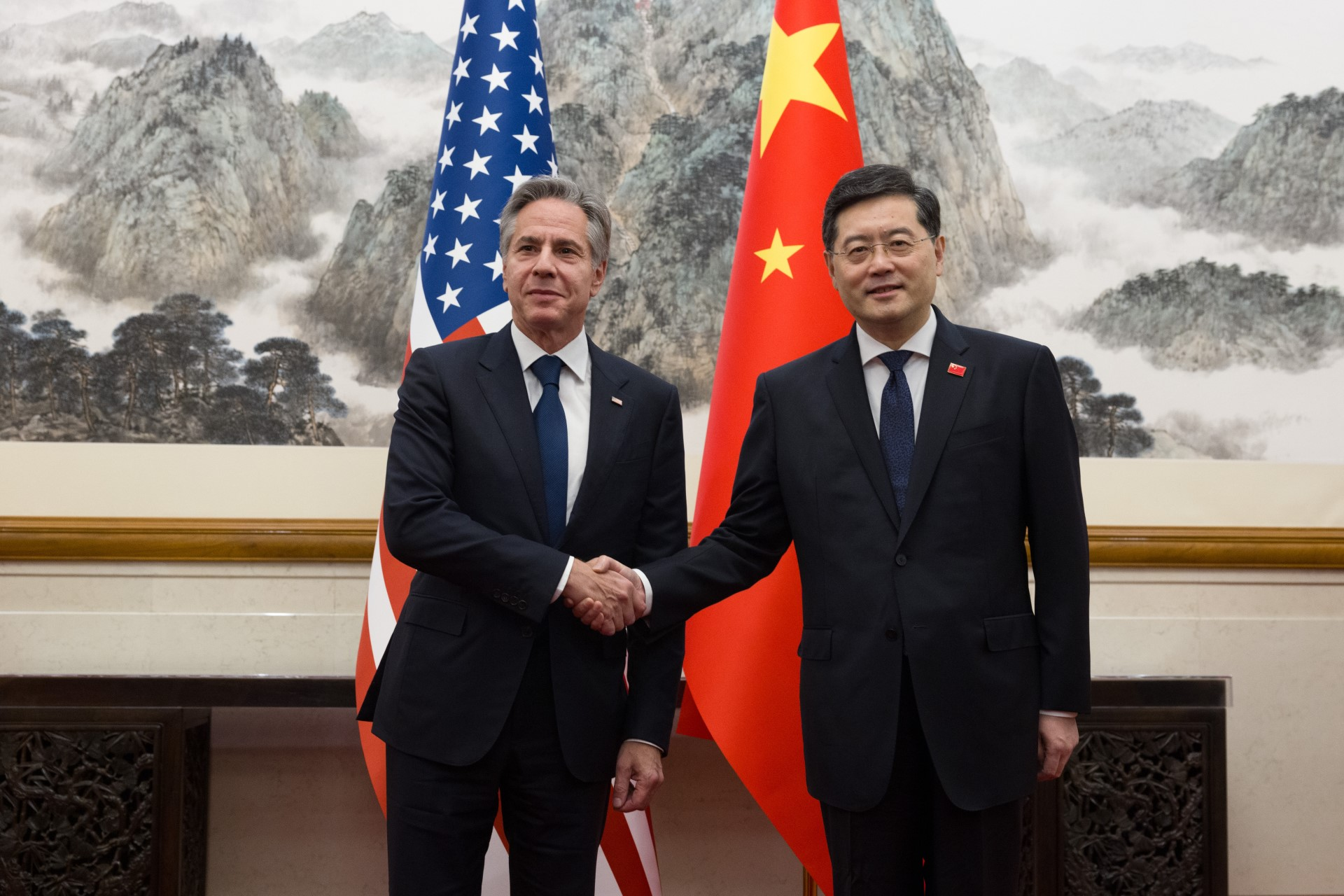
Qin with U.S. Secretary of State Antony Blinken in Beijing, 18 June 2023

Qin was appointed as Minister of Foreign Affairs of China on 30 December 2022, succeeding Wang Yi. He vacated the post of Chinese ambassador to the United States on 5 January 2023. Qin was appointed as a State Councilor during the first session of the 14th National People's Congress on the nomination of the newly appointed premier Li Qiang on 12 March 2023.

As foreign minister, in 2023, Qin criticized the tag of being a wolf warrior diplomat saying that the label is a "narrative trap" by those who "know little about China and its diplomacy or have a hidden agenda in disregard of facts."

=== Removal ===
On 11 July 2023, Chinese Foreign Ministry spokesperson Wang Wenbin announced that Qin would not be attending the ASEAN foreign ministers meetings held in Jakarta, Indonesia, on 13 and 14 July for health reasons. Instead, he was represented by his predecessor Wang Yi, who is serving as the director of the Office of the CCP's Central Foreign Affairs Commission, the top diplomatic post in China at the meetings. Qin has not been seen in public since 25 June 2023 – when he held talks with counterparts from Russia, Vietnam, and Sri Lanka – and did not meet visiting dignitaries including United States Treasury Secretary Janet Yellen and former United States Secretary of State Henry Kissinger in July. His non-availability was one of the reasons for the cancellation of High Representative of the Union for Foreign Affairs and Security Policy Josep Borrell's visit to China in July. Speculation around Qin's disappearance centered on an alleged affair with Hong Kong reporter Fu Xiaotian, who also seemed to disappear around the same time.

On 25 July 2023, Qin was removed from the office as the Minister of Foreign Affairs of China by a decree signed by president Xi Jinping, after a list of appointments and removals was passed by the Standing Committee of the 14th National People's Congress (NPC). Qin's predecessor Wang Yi, was re-appointed to the office. China's foreign ministry and state media agencies, including Xinhua News Agency, did not explain Qin's dismissal. All mentions of Qin during his tenure as foreign minister were removed from the Ministry of Foreign Affairs website, though they were restored the following day. With a tenure of 207 days, Qin is the shortest-serving minister of foreign affairs of the People's Republic of China.

The sixth meeting of the Standing Committee of the 14th NPC, concluded on 24 October 2023, decided to remove Qin Gang from the post of State Councillor, and remove Li Shangfu from the posts of State Councillor and Minister of National Defense.

On 27 February 2024, Chinese state media announced that Qin had resigned as a lawmaker from the 14th NPC and his resignation was accepted by the Tianjin Municipal People's Congress Standing Committee. On 18 July 2024, the 3rd Plenary Session of the 20th CCP Central Committee approved Qin's resignation from the Central Committee.

==== Speculation ====
According to a 19 September 2023 article in The Wall Street Journal, Qin had engaged in an extramarital relationship while serving as ambassador. The Journal cited two unnamed sources who stated that the relationship resulted in the birth of a child while in the United States. According to the Journal, Qin was cooperating with a CCP investigation focusing on whether the extramarital relationship or Qin's conduct had compromised Chinese national security.

According to a 26 September 2023 article by the Financial Times, Qin was in a relationship with Fu Xiaotian, citing unnamed sources. According to the article, Qin and Fu met in London in 2010, when both were in the UK, and they developed a closer relationship nearly a decade later in Beijing. It also mentioned that Fu had a child with the help of a surrogate mother in the U.S. It mentioned that Qin began to limit contact with Fu after his appointment as foreign minister, prompting Fu to drop hints about their relationship on social media. Citing two unnamed individuals, Politico Europe wrote that Qin may have committed suicide or died following torture in July. According to Nikkei Asia, sources familiar with China–Russia relations said that "Qin Gang became the first victim of the informational warfare that reflects a discord between China and Russia."

BBC Chinese noted that the 18 July 2024 announcement of Qin's resignation from the 20th CCP Central Committee referred him as "Comrade" (Chinese: 同志; pinyin: Tóngzhì), suggesting that Qin was allowed to resign voluntarily and that he will not be held criminally responsible for the actions that brought about his removal. In September 2024, two former U.S. officials who spoke to The Washington Post stated that Qin has been nominally assigned to a low-level job at the World Affairs Press, a publishing house affiliated with the Ministry of Foreign Affairs. Ming Pao reported citing sources that this reporting was mistaken, and that World Affairs Press only had a staff member who happened to share the same name with Qin. On 18 October 2024, The Wall Street Journal released a three-part podcast which stated sources told them the Russians told the Chinese that Fu Xiaotian was a UK MI6 agent. On 17 October 2025, Qin was rumored to attend the 28th Beijing International Music Festival hosted by the Beijing Municipal People's Government. In March 2026, Ming reported that Qin Gang had been demoted to a vice-ministerial level official and had retired early.

== Personal life ==
Qin is married to Lin Yan. According to the official resume published by the Ministry of Foreign Affairs, he has one son.

== Notes ==
Government offices
| Preceded by Ma Zhaoxu | Director of Foreign Ministry Information Department; 2011–2015 | Succeeded by Liu Jianchao |
| Preceded by Zhang Kunsheng | Director of Foreign Ministry Protocol Department; 2015–2018 | Succeeded by Hong Lei |
| Preceded by Li Baodong | Vice Minister of Foreign Affairs; 2018–2021 | Succeeded by Deng Li |
| Preceded by Wang Yi | Minister of Foreign Affairs; 2022–2023 | Succeeded by Wang Yi |
Diplomatic posts
| Preceded by Cui Tiankai | Ambassador of China to the United States; 2021–2023 | Succeeded by Xie Feng |
