= Jinhua Ye =

Chinese chemist

- Education: Zhejiang University; University of Tokyo
- Scientific career
- Workplaces: Osaka University; National Institute for Materials Science

Jinhua Ye is a Chinese chemist who is a professor at the National Institute for Materials Science in Tsukuba. Her research considers high-temperature superconductors for photocatalysis. She was elected Fellow of the Royal Society of Chemistry in 2016 and has been included in the Clarivate Analytics Highly Cited Researcher every year since then.

== Early life and education ==
Ye became interested in science fiction as a child. She was particularly interested in a story by Ye Yonglie that included a castle made from diamond. Ye learned that photocatalysis could split water into hydrogen and oxygen. She then became inspired by Jules Verne's The Mysterious Island,

I believe that water will one day be employed as fuel, that hydrogen and oxygen which constitute it, used singly or together, will furnish an inexhaustible source of heat and light, of an intensity of which coal is not capable.

She studied chemistry at the Zhejiang University. After completing her undergraduate degree, she moved to Japan, where she joined the University of Tokyo. After earning her doctorate in 1990, she joined Osaka University as a research associate.

== Research and career ==
In 1991, Ye joined the National Institute for Materials Science. She was made Director of Photocatalytic Materials Center in 2006 and Director of Environmental Remediation Materials in 2011.

Ye has dedicated her career to the realization of artificial photosynthesis. She is particularly interested in the development of materials that harvest the most sunlight. Ye has studied the reaction mechanisms, and, in an effort to overcome harsh reaction kinetics, has worked on the careful construction of interfaces. In particular, Ye has developed nano-structured surfaces that enhance reactivities, and, using localized surface plasmon resonance, broaden the spectral range of her photocatalytic materials.

Ye was elected Fellow of the Royal Society of Chemistry in 2016. In 2022, she was included by the American Chemical Society Energy Letters in their list of the world's leading women scientists in energy research.

== Selected publications ==
- Zhigang Zou; Jinhua Ye; Kazuhiro Sayama; Hironori Arakawa (December 2001). "Direct splitting of water under visible light irradiation with an oxide semiconductor photocatalyst". Nature. 414 (6864): 625–627. doi:10.1038/414625a. ISSN 1476-4687. PMID 11740556. Wikidata Q58402507.
- Hua Tong; Shuxin Ouyang; Yingpu Bi; Naoto Umezawa; Mitsutake Oshikiri; Jinhua Ye (4 October 2011). "Nano-photocatalytic materials: possibilities and challenges". Advanced Materials. 24 (2): 229–251. doi:10.1002/adma.201102752. ISSN 0935-9648. PMID 21972044. Wikidata Q37942515.
- Zhiguo Yi; Jinhua Ye; Naoki Kikugawa; et al. (6 June 2010). "An orthophosphate semiconductor with photooxidation properties under visible-light irradiation". Nature Materials. 9 (7): 559–564. doi:10.1038/nmat2780. ISSN 1476-1122. PMID 20526323. Wikidata Q34119300.
