= List of ambassadors of China to Nigeria =

The ambassador of China to Nigeria is the official representative of the People's Republic of China to Nigeria.

== List of representatives ==
Name (English)	Name (Chinese)	Tenure begins	Tenure ends	Note
Zhang Li	章立	April 1971	August 1971	Chargé d'affaires
Yang Qiliang	杨琪良	August 1971	August 1973	
Feng Yujiu	冯于九	November 1973	January 1979	
Lei Yang (diplomat)	雷阳	April 1980	February 1985	
Wang Yusheng	王嵎生	March 1985	April 1988	
Jin Boxiong	金伯雄	July 1988	May 1992	
Hu Lipeng	胡立鹏	July 1992	January 1995	
Lü Fengding	吕凤鼎	February 1995	March 1999	
Liang Yinzhu	梁银柱	April 1999	June 2003	
Wang Yongqiu	王永秋	June 2003	August 2006	
Xu Jianguo	徐建国	September 2006	August 2010	
Deng Boqing	邓波清	September 2010	February 2014	
Gu Xiaojie	顾小杰	April 2014	June 2016	
Zhou Pingjian	周平剑	September 2016	July 2020	
Cui Jianchun	崔建春	March 2021		

== See also ==
- China–Nigeria relations
