= Han Nianlong =

Chinese diplomat

Han Nianlong (Chinese: 韩念龙) (1910–2000) was a Chinese diplomat. He was Ambassador of the People's Republic of China to Pakistan (1951–1956) and Sweden (1956–1958).

Nianlong was a native of Renhuai, Guizhou province. He was a member of the Chinese Communist Party. He took part in the revolution in the spring of 1935 and joined the Chinese Communist Party in March 1936. He served as a member of the Working Committee of Chongming County, Jiangsu Province and director of the political Department of the Chongming guerrillas, director of the Political Department of the 3rd Brigade of Chongqi Sea, and director of the Political Department of the 9th Regiment of the 3rd Brigade of the 1st Division of the New Fourth Army. He served as director of the eighth column political department of the Central China Field Army, representative of the Military coordination Department in Huaiyin Executive group, minister of the Propaganda Department of the Political Department of the East China Field Army, Deputy political Commissar of Shanghai Garrison Command, head of the Chinese People's Volunteers captured management group.

Han Nianlong entered Ministry of Foreign Affairs in December 1949 and served as ambassador to Pakistan from 1951 to 1956 and to Sweden from 1956 to 1958. He was former member of Central Advisory Commission of the Chinese Communist Party and former Vice Foreign Minister. He retired in October 1994 and died in June 2000.

== Early life in the military before PRC was established ==
=== Shanghai anti-Japanese strike movement ===
In 1935, Han Nianlong participated as a leader in Shanghai anti-Japanese strike movement, which has involved more than 60,000 people, implemented the spirit of Liu Shaoqi's "Outline of the White Area Workers' Movement" and the CCP Central Committee's policy on the Anti-Japanese national United front, so that the strike struggle won a victory.

=== Preside over the "Gao You War" surrender ceremony ===
On August 15, 1945, the Emperor of Japan formally issued the imperial rescript to surrender, but the Japanese troops stationed in Gaoyou, Jiangsu, refused to surrender. Until December 25, he ignored the new Fourth Army's ultimatum to surrender. SuYu commander ordered the new fourth army took advantage of the heavy fog, against the wind and rain, in the mud, to catch the enemy unaware respectively from three directions, north, east, south of the city launched an all-out offensive the gaoyou city, at 4 PM to 26, the new fourth army breached in gaoyou city, the Japanese aggressors defeat is a foregone conclusion, the command is surrounded by the new fourth army closely, and under the powerful artillery deterrent Siege of the soldiers Shouting, Gaoyou Japanese commander of the city defense colonel Rock had to agree to surrender the New Fourth Army, then held a surrender ceremony.

The ceremony was held in the Park Auditorium, No. 70, Yihe Lane, Gaoyou District. At eleven o 'clock in the evening, Han Nianlong, director of the political Department of the eighth column of the New Fourth Army, went to deal with the surrender as the pleniary representative of the New Fourth Army.

During the ceremony, Han Nianlong announced three requirements to the Japanese army that surrendered: First, the surrender of the Japanese officers and men, each back to standby. For safety, activities are limited to the hospital; Second, The Japanese soldiers killed in battle may be cremated according to Japanese custom and their ashes collected for taking back to the mainland; Third, the injured Japanese officers and soldiers will be treated by our medical staff in collaboration with The Japanese medical staff.

The surrender of Gaoyou was the largest surrender ceremony held by the Chinese Communist Party] and the New Fourth Army under its leadership, and the last surrender ceremony of the Japanese aggressors to the Eighth Route Army and the New Fourth Army under the leadership of the CCP.

== Diplomacy after PRC was established ==
=== Start of diplomatic career ===
The People's Republic of China was established in October 1949. Since then, China has shown strong need to associate with the rest of the world. But considering having to get rid of Kuomintang diplomatic clout, PRC selected a new group of potential diplomats from the People's Liberation Army, Han included. In 1951, Han officially began his diplomatic career as Ambassador to Pakistan.

In early 1951, Pakistan has expressed the strong wish to establish diplomatic relations with China. In the same year, PRC government decided to appoint Han to be Chinese Ambassador to Pakistan. Han strengthened when he arrived in Pakistan that PRC had developed diplomatic relationship with Pakistan on the basis of equality, mutual benefit and respect of each other's territorial sovereignty.

Later, Han served as Ambassador to Sweden from 1956 to 1958.

=== Diplomacy back in China ===
Han was appointed to be Assistant Minister of Foreign Affairs in 1958. In 1964, he was promoted to the position of Vice Ministry of Foreign Affairs, responsible for Asian affairs.

==== Sino-Japan relationship ====
Han participated in several talks concerning the establishment of the diplomatic relationship between China and Japan.

In 1974, Han visited Japan and signed Sino-Japan Shipping Agreement and officially talked with Kimura Toshio and Tōgō Fumihiko about the agreement on behalf of the government of China.

In the talks, Han insisted that the agreement must be based on the spirit of Sino-Japan Joint Statement and Five Principles of Peaceful Coexistence and strengthened the standpoints of both countries about Taiwan issue should correspond with what was claimed in China-Japan Joint Statement. Han agreed with Japan delegation during the talks on the decision that China will forgive the war crime of Japan and give up the compensation as long as Japan promise to obey China-Japan Joint Statement. Han also agreed with Japan on the consensus that both countries should resist hegemonism.

==== Sino-US relationship ====
During the negotiation between China and US that started in July and ended in December in 1978, US claimed to have intended to sell weapons to Taiwan to prevent China from militarily unifying Taiwan. As response, Han clearly claimed that China was unable to promise a peaceful settlement of Taiwan issue. He also strongly criticized US government for the intention to militarily supporting Taiwan and the behavior of "violating the spirit of the Shanghai Communique and the Communique for Normalisation of US-China Relations in 1979", claiming that US was "infringing China's sovereignty and interfering in China's internal affairs".

==== Sino-Vietnam relationship ====
After Socialist Republic of Vietnam was established, the conflicts between the two countries about the border issue has arisen.

Sino-Vietnamese War happened in early 1979. In the same year in Sino-Vietnam negotiation, Han charged Vietnam of the behavior of sending army to the border and Chinese territory, which was seen as provocation and added to the tension. Han also required that Vietnam government stop the policy of promoting hegemonism including invading Cambodia. He claimed that to resist hegemonism is a must before improving Sino-Vietnam relationship.

In 1980, however, Han was blamed by Vietnam "for making 'bellicose statements'". Vietnam also claimed that "Han told the Japanese news agency Kyoto in Peking yesterday that China reserved the right to attack Vietnam again."

== Legacy ==
Han Nianlong helped set up an independent figure of China in front of the rest of the world. Han Nianlong was known as a principled official, who was loyal to his country and brave to fight against the reactionary force. He was also complimented for caring his subordinates. He was strict with leader officials, which showed his caring for education of cadres, but he was tolerant with ordinary cadres, often forgiving others’ mistakes.

Preceded by New office	Ambassador of China to Pakistan; 1951–1956	Succeeded by Geng Biao
Preceded by Geng Biao	Ambassador of China to Sweden; 1956–1958	Succeeded by Dong Yueqian
