= Zhang Kunsheng =

Chinese politician

- 张昆生
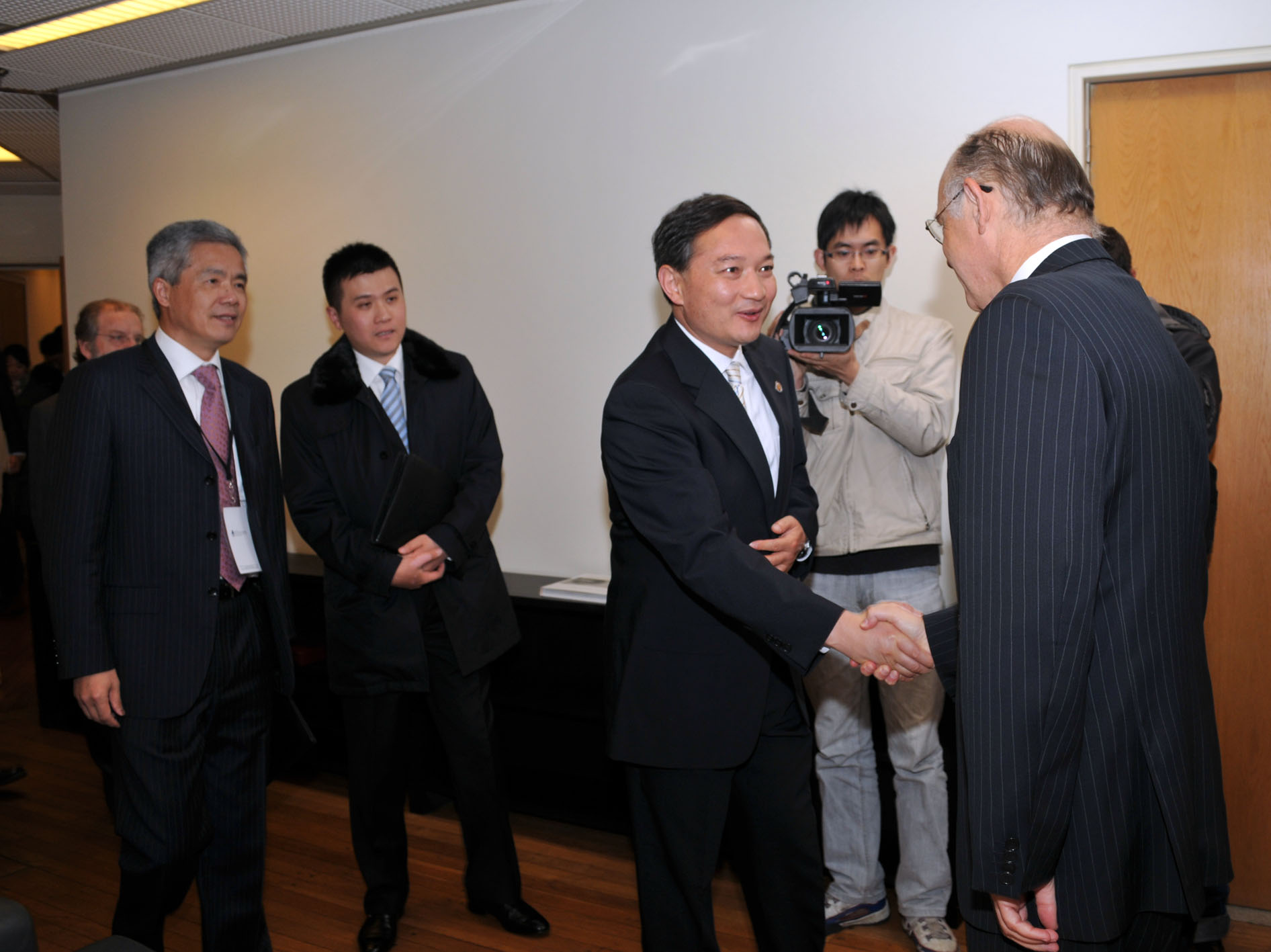
- Zhang (centre) meets with Héctor Timerman (right) in Argentina, 2011

Assistant Minister of Foreign Affairs
- In office 2011 – January 2015
- Minister: Yang Jiechi; Wang Yi

First Secretary, Embassy of China in Washington, D.C.
- In office 1997–2001

Personal details
- Born: August 1958 (age 68) Kunming, Yunnan
- Party: Chinese Communist Party (expelled in 2016)
- Spouse: Xiao Jie
- Children: 1
- Education: Peking University (PhD)

Chinese name
- Traditional Chinese: 張昆生
- Simplified Chinese: 张昆生
Transcriptions
Standard Mandarin
- Hanyu Pinyin: Zhāng Kūnshēng

Zhang Kunsheng (Chinese: 张昆生; born August 1958) is a former Chinese politician who from 2011 to 2015 served as Assistant Minister of Foreign Affairs. In 2015, Zhang was investigated by the Central Commission for Discipline Inspection and expelled from the Chinese Communist Party (CCP) for allegedly violating codes of conduct, making him the most senior diplomat in the Ministry of Foreign Affairs to have been arrested during the anti-corruption campaign under Xi Jinping. Despite this, Zhang has yet to be formally accused of any crime as of 2020.

== Life and career ==
Zhang was born and raised in Kunming, Yunnan, while his ancestral home in Shanxi. He graduated from Peking University in 1995, with a Doctorate in International Politics. He was assigned to Ministry of Foreign Affairs (MFA) in 1985. In 1997 he became the First Secretary of Embassy of China in Washington, D.C., a position he held until 2001. During this time, Zhang helped plan the official state visit of Jiang Zemin to the United States of America.

Zhang also served as Counsellor of the Department of North American and Oceanian Affairs of the Ministry of Foreign Affairs of the People's Republic of China from 2001 to 2003, Counsellor of the General Office of the Ministry of Foreign Affairs from 2003 to 2007, and Director-General of the Protocol Department of the Ministry of Foreign Affairs from 2007 to 2011. He was promoted to Assistant Minister of Foreign Affairs in 2011.

In 2015, Zhang was placed under investigation by the Central Commission for Discipline Inspection for "suspected disciplinary violation." The year after, despite lack of concrete evidence, he was expelled from the CCP. The accusations levied against Zhang have been questioned by analysts, who suspect the arrest was politically motivated. As the most senior diplomat in the Ministry of Foreign Affairs to have been arrested during the anti-corruption campaign, Zhang has yet to be formally accused of any crime by any judicial body.

== Personal life ==
Zhang was married to Xiao Jie (Chinese: 肖杰), a former badminton player of the China national badminton team. Together, they have one daughter.
