= Yang Bozhen =

Chinese diplomat

Yang Bozhen (1919–1987) was a Chinese diplomat. He was Ambassador of the People's Republic of China to Sweden (1964–1969).

Preceded by Dong Yueqian	Ambassador of China to Sweden; 1964–1969	Succeeded by Wang Dong
