= Li Jinhua (diplomat) =

Chinese diplomat (born 1932)

- 李金华

Chinese Ambassador to New Zealand
- In office March 1991 – March 1995
- Preceded by: Ni Zhengjian
- Succeeded by: Huang Guifang

7th Spokesperson of the Ministry of Foreign Affairs of China
- In office 1987–1991

Personal details
- Born: September 1932 (age 94) Jinan, Shandong, Republic of China
- Party: Chinese Communist Party
- Spouse: Yuan Shiyin
- Education: Nankai University

Li Jinhua
- Simplified Chinese: 李金华
- Traditional Chinese: 李金華
Transcriptions
Standard Mandarin
- Hanyu Pinyin: Lǐ Jīnhuá
- Wade–Giles: Li3 Chin1-hua2

Li Jinhua (Chinese: 李金华; pinyin: Lǐ Jīnhuá; born September 1932) is a Chinese retired diplomat who served as the Chinese Ambassador to New Zealand and Deputy Director-General of the Information Department of the Ministry of Foreign Affairs of the People's Republic of China. She was the first female spokesperson of the ministry, having been appointed to the role in 1987.

== Early life ==
Li Jinhua was born in September 1932 in Jinan, Shandong Province, with ancestral roots in Huanghua, Hebei Province. Her father died during her childhood, and she was raised by her mother and older brother. In 1949, shortly before the founding of the People's Republic of China, she graduated from Yaohua High School in Tianjin and was admitted to the Department of History at Nankai University.

== Diplomatic career ==
After graduating from Nankai in 1953, Li was assigned to work in the library and documentation office of the Department of Intelligence (the predecessor to the Information Department) of the Ministry of Foreign Affairs, marking the beginning of her diplomatic career. From the 1950s to the mid-1990s, she served in the Information Department, where she held various positions including staff member, deputy division chief, counselor, deputy director-general, and spokesperson.

In addition to her work in the Information Department, Li held diplomatic posts abroad, serving as clerk, first secretary, and counselor at Chinese embassies in Pakistan and Chile. She also worked in the First Asian Affairs Department of the Ministry. While posted at the Chinese Embassy in Santiago, Chile, she earned recognition for her professional capabilities from then-ambassador Tang Haiguang.

In 1987, she was appointed the seventh spokesperson of the Ministry of Foreign Affairs, becoming the first woman to hold the position since the spokesperson system was established by then Director of the Information Department Qian Qichen in the early 1980s. Between 1987 and 1991, she hosted and participated in numerous regular press conferences and played a key role in communicating the Chinese government's position during and following the 1989 Tiananmen Square protests and massacre.

On 18 October 1991, she was appointed by President of China Yang Shangkun as Ambassador Extraordinary and Plenipotentiary of China to New Zealand. Her tenure ended in March 1995 and she retired from diplomatic service on the same year.

== Personal life ==
Li Jinhua's husband, Yuan Shiyin, was also a senior Chinese diplomat. He served as political counselor and chargé d'affaires at various Chinese embassies abroad.

Diplomatic posts
Preceded by Ni Zhengjian (倪政建)	Chinese Ambassador to New Zealand; 1991–1995	Succeeded by Huang Guifang (黄桂芳)
