= Wang Luming =

Chinese diplomat

Wang Luming (Chinese: 王鲁明; November 1915 – September 28, 2005) was a Chinese diplomat. He was Ambassador of the People's Republic of China to Sweden (1972–1974).

| Preceded by Wang Dong | Ambassador of China to Sweden; 1972–1974 | Succeeded by Qin Lizhen |
