= Zhao Lijian =

Chinese civil servant

- 赵立坚
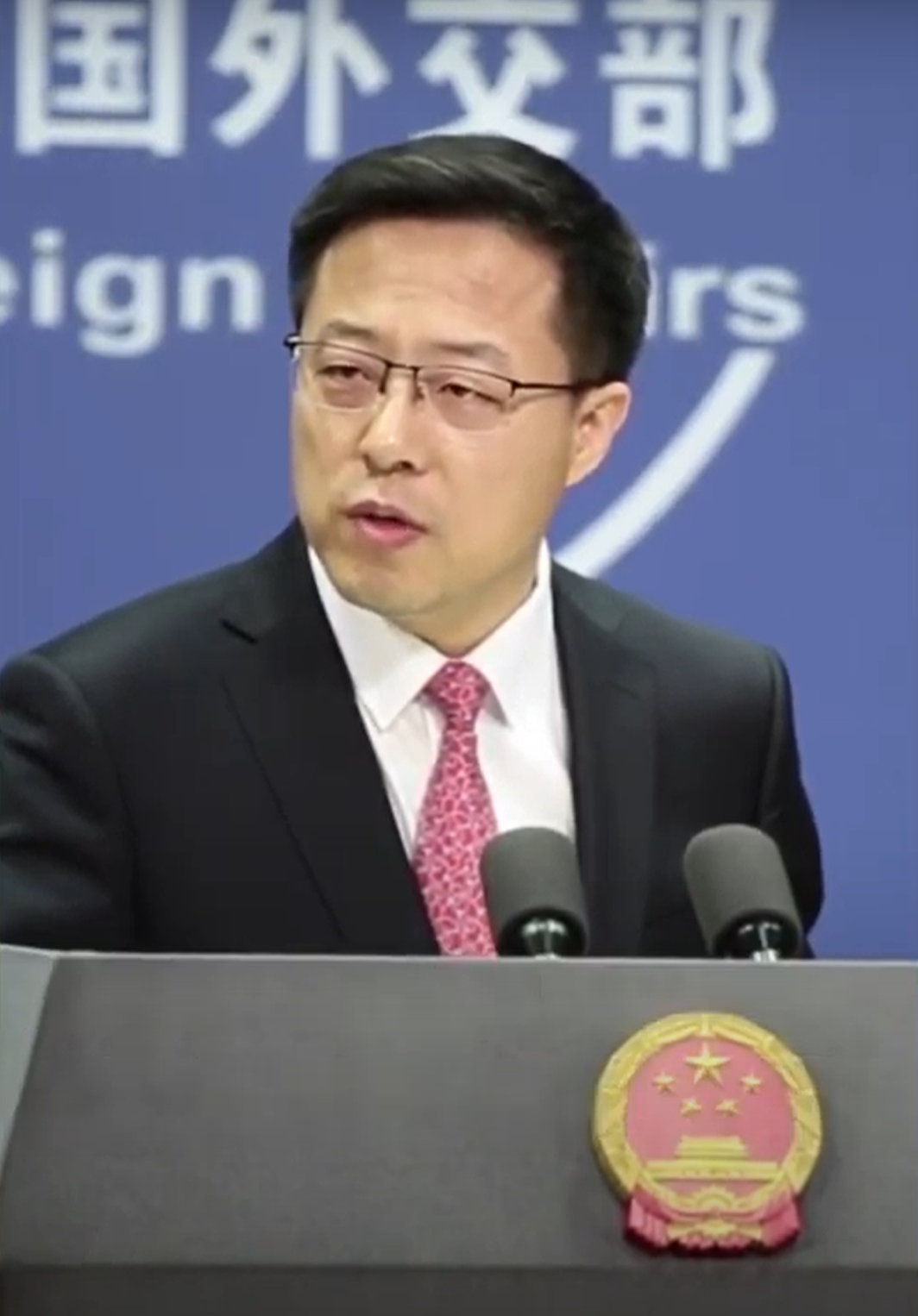
- Lijian on 3 June 2020

Deputy Director of the Boundary and Ocean Affairs Department of the Ministry of Foreign Affairs
- Incumbent
- Assumed office 9 January 2023
- Director: Hong Liang

Deputy Director of the Information Department of the Ministry of Foreign Affairs
- In office August 2019 – 9 January 2023
- Director: Hua Chunying

Personal details
- Born: 10 November 1972 (age 54) Luannan County, Hebei, China
- Party: Chinese Communist Party (1996–present)
- Education: Changsha Railway College (UG); Korea Development Institute (MPP)

Chinese name
- Simplified Chinese: 赵立坚
- Traditional Chinese: 趙立堅
Transcriptions
Standard Mandarin
- Hanyu Pinyin: Zhào Lìjiān

Zhao Lijian (Chinese: 赵立坚; pinyin: Zhào Lìjiān; born 10 November 1972) is a Chinese civil servant and diplomat who has been serving as deputy director of the Department of Boundary and Ocean Affairs at the Ministry of Foreign Affairs of China since January 2023.

He joined the foreign service in 1996. Zhao became notable for his outspoken use of Twitter when he served as an envoy-level attaché at the Embassy of China in Pakistan from 2015 to 2019. From 2019 and 2023, he served as deputy director of the Information Department at the Ministry of Foreign Affairs and the 31st spokesperson of the Ministry. He has been described as a prominent wolf warrior diplomat during his tenure. In January 2023, Zhao was removed from the office as one of the ministry's spokespeople and was appointed as deputy director of the Department of Boundary and Ocean Affairs at the Ministry of Foreign Affairs.

== Early life and education ==
Zhao Lijian was born in Luannan County, Tangshan, Hebei in November 1972. He studied at Luannan County No. 1 Middle School.

Zhao graduated from Changsha Railway College (merged to form Central South University) with a major in foreign language studies.

When he served as a first secretary at the Embassy of China in the United States, he enrolled at the Korea Development Institute from February to December 2005 and received a master's degree in public policy.

== Career ==
Zhao joined the Department of Asian Affairs of the Ministry of Foreign Affairs of China in 1996 as a section member. He was transferred abroad and served as staff member and third secretary at the Embassy of China in Pakistan from 2003 to 2009. He served as first secretary at the Embassy of China in the United States from 2009 and 2013.

Zhao returned to Beijing in 2013, and served as a first secretary and an office director at the Department of Asian Affairs of the Ministry of Foreign Affairs from 2013 to 2015. He then served as an envoy-level attaché at the Embassy of China in Pakistan in Islamabad from 2015 to 2019.

Zhao was recalled to Beijing in August 2019, and served as deputy director of the Information Department of the Ministry of Foreign Affairs and spokesperson of the Ministry of Foreign Affairs from August 2019 to January 2023. Zhao was one of the most prominent wolf warrior diplomats.

Zhao was then transferred to the ministry's Department of Boundary and Ocean Affairs, and has been serving as deputy director of the department since January 2023. Media reported his transfer as part of China's rethinking of wolf warrior diplomacy.

== Statements and controversies ==
During his second tenure at the Embassy of China in Pakistan from 2015 to 2019, Zhao used the name "Muhammad Lijian Zhao" on his official Twitter account, but he dropped "Muhammad" in 2017 after there were reports that China banned several Islamic names in Xinjiang. Zhao became well known for his frequent use of Twitter to criticize the United States, including on topics such as race relations and the United States foreign policy in the Middle East. Paired with his press conference statements, he has established a "long history of provocative assertions."

The Chinese Communist Party puts a high premium on information management, and Zhao used press conferences and Twitter to direct information and reach China's strategic goals. Although it had been banned in China in 2009, Zhao joined Twitter in 2010, becoming one of the first envoys of the Chinese government to use the social media platform. By the end of 2020, Zhao had 780,000 followers, further reaching 1.9 million by 2023. Since his reassignment to the Department of Boundary and Ocean Affairs in January 2023, Zhao has posted much less frequently on Twitter.

=== "Racist" Washington exchange ===
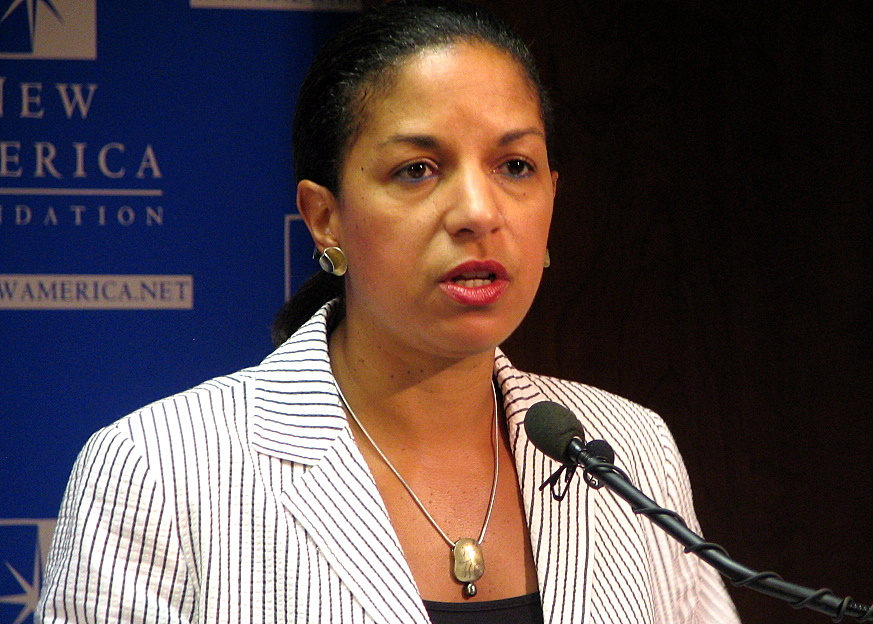
Zhao's tweets on race in Washington, D.C. were directly challenged by former National Security Adviser, Susan Rice

In 2019 Zhao tweeted, "If you're in Washington, D.C., you know the white never go to the SW area, because it's an area for the black & Latin. There's a saying 'black in & white out'", to which Susan Rice, National Security Adviser to Barack Obama, responded: "You are a racist disgrace. And shockingly ignorant too." Zhao returned the insults, calling Rice "a disgrace" and "shockingly ignorant" in a tweet as well as calling her accusation of racism "disgraceful and disgusting." Although Zhao stood by the tweets, he deleted them. The dispute raised his profile in Beijing.

=== COVID-19 suggestions and conspiracy theories ===
On 5 March 2020, Zhao gave a press conference in Beijing and responded to an American TV host's demand that the Chinese should "formally apologize" for the novel coronavirus pandemic. Zhao stated that: "The announcement is absurd and ridiculous, which fully exposes his arrogance, prejudice and ignorance of China... [t]he H1N1 flu outbreak in the United States in 2009 spread to 214 countries and regions and killed at least 18,449 people that year. Has anyone asked the United States to apologize?" He went on to say, "no conclusion has been reached yet on the origin of the virus, as relevant tracing work is still underway." From here Zhao turned to Twitter.

On 9 March he condemned United States Secretary of State Mike Pompeo for using the term "Wuhan virus". Zhao retweeted Americans who were accusing Republicans of racism and xenophobia. On 12 March Zhao, without asking for permission from his superiors, appeared to promote a conspiracy theory that the United States military could have brought the novel coronavirus to China, tweeting first in English and separately in Chinese:

When did patient zero begin in US? How many people are infected? What are the names of the hospitals? It might be US army who brought the epidemic to Wuhan. Be transparent! Make public your data! US owe us an explanation!

The allegation was apparently linked to the United States' participation at the 2019 Military World Games held in Wuhan in October, two months before any reported outbreaks. Zhao accompanied his post with a video of Robert Redfield, director of the US Centers for Disease Control and Prevention, addressing a US Congressional committee on March 11. Redfield had said some Americans who had seemingly died from influenza later tested positive for the new coronavirus. Redfield did not say when those people had died or over what time period. Zhao also linked to article from the Centre for Research on Globalization which BuzzFeed News claimed was part of "a bevy of misinformation about the coronavirus... covered by Global Times, that claimed the virus began in late November somewhere else than Wuhan." The US State Department summoned Chinese ambassador Cui Tiankai on March 13 to protest about Zhao's comments.

During an interview on Axios on HBO, Cui distanced himself from Zhao's comments and said speculating about the origin of the virus was "harmful". In April 2020, Zhao defended his tweets, saying his posts were "a reaction to some U.S. politicians stigmatizing China a while ago." In July 2021, Zhao commented that the plan on WHO's 2nd phase study was "at odds with the position of China" and other countries, adding, "Why can't origins study be conducted in the U.S. just as in China?" Reportedly, Zhao's actions and conducts created divisions within the Foreign Ministry, with many supporting it while others opposing it.

On August 11, 2021, Zhao Lijian posted a tweet supporting the Chinese conspiracy theory that SARS-CoV-2 virus was developed by the United States military at Fort Detrick.

=== Treatment of Uyghur people ===
Following the leak of the China Cables via The New York Times the Chinese government has come under Western Media's and government's criticism for its treatment of Uyghurs in the Xinjiang re-education camps (since 2017) as methods of confronting Islamist terrorism in Xinjiang led by Turkistan Islamic Party. Zhao has used media statements and Twitter to defend Beijing's treatment of the minority group. Associated Press claimed that authorities in China were using forced birth control amongst Uyghur people, whilst encouraging larger families of Han Chinese. Zhao dismissed the findings of AP as "baseless" and showed "ulterior motives." He turned attention back on the media, accusing outlets of "cooking up false information on Xinjiang-related issues".

In November 2020, Pope Francis named China's Uyghur minority among a list of the world's persecuted peoples. Zhao retorted that the Pope's words had "no factual basis". In January 2021, Zhao responded to questions about a Uyghur genocide during a press briefing by stating, "China has no genocide; China has no genocide; China has no genocide, period."

=== Five Eyes ===
On 19 November 2020, the Five Eyes intelligence-sharing group said China's imposition of new rules to disqualify elected legislators in Hong Kong appeared to be part of a campaign to silence critics and called on Beijing to reverse course. Responding to this, Zhao said that "No matter if they have five eyes or 10 eyes, if they dare to harm China's sovereignty, security and development interests, they should beware of their eyes being poked and blinded".

=== Brereton Report ===
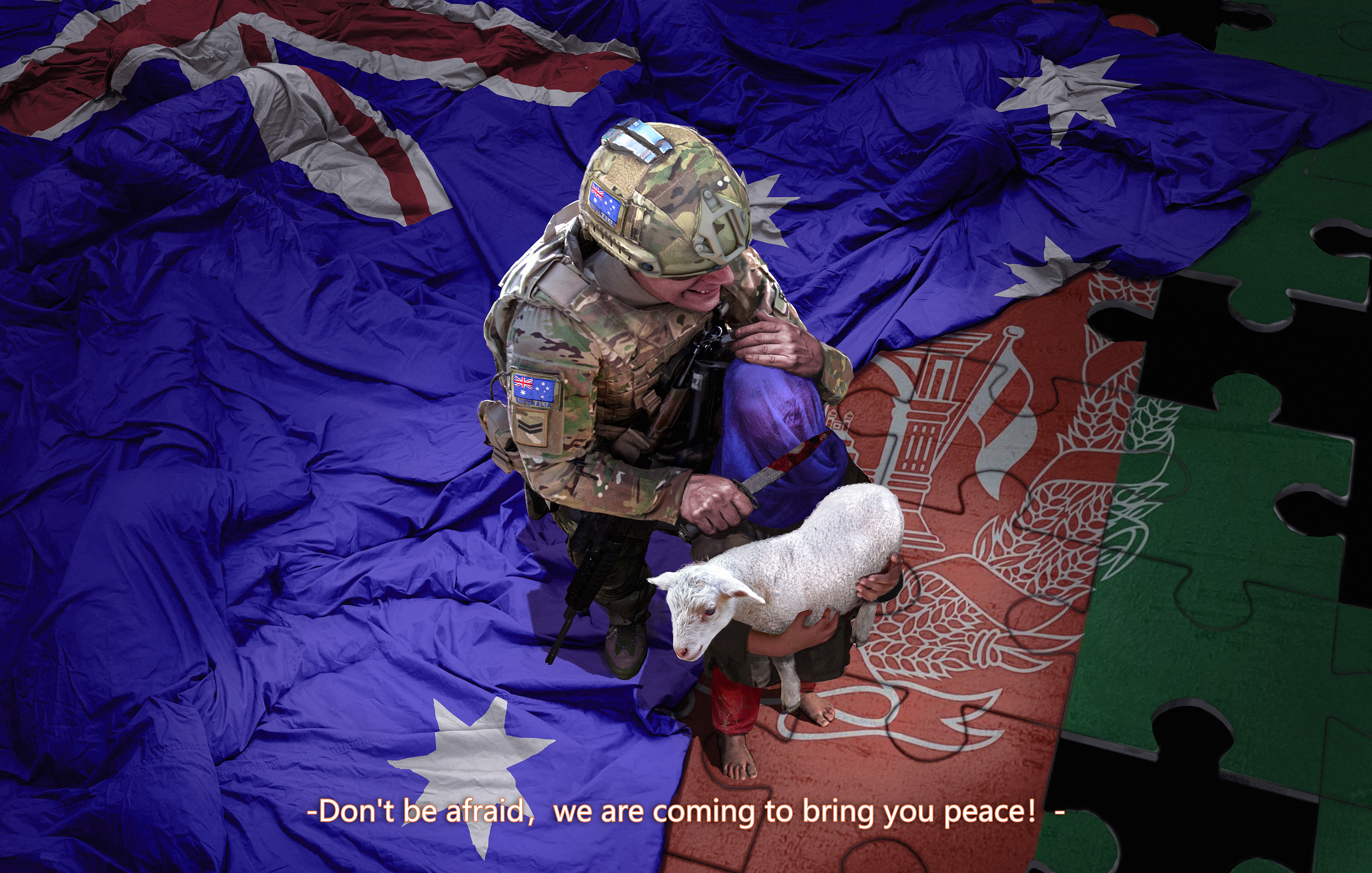
The digitally-created image Peace Force (和平之师) by cartoonist Wuheqilin

On 30 November 2020, Zhao posted on his personal Twitter account "Shocked by murder of Afghan civilians & prisoners by Australian soldiers. We strongly condemn such acts, &call [sic] for holding them accountable", accompanied with an image of an Australian soldier who appears to hold a bloodied knife against the throat of an Afghan child. The image, originally created by the Chinese internet political cartoonist Wuheqilin (乌合麒麟), is believed to be a reference to the Brereton Report, which had been released earlier by the Australian government that month, and which details war crimes committed by the Australian Defence Force during the War in Afghanistan between 2005 and 2016, including the throat-slitting of two 14-year-old Afghan boys, and its subsequent cover-up by the Australian military. Later that day, the Australian Prime Minister Scott Morrison called a press conference, calling the image "offensive" and "truly repugnant", demanding a formal apology from the Chinese government and requesting Twitter to remove the tweet. China rejected the demands for an apology on the following day, while Twitter also refused Morrison's request to remove Zhao Lijian's tweet. The artist behind the illustration said it was created "as a metaphor". Eventually, Morrison called for stopping further amplification of the incident, and to seek conciliation. The incident had the effect of unifying Australian politicians in condemning China across party lines, while also drawing attention to the Brereton Report. It was further seen as a sign of deteriorating relations between Australia and China.

The New Zealand and French governments voiced support for the Australian government and criticised Zhao's Twitter post, while the Russian government stated that "the circumstances make us truly doubt the genuine capacity of Australian authorities to actually hold accountable all the servicemen who are guilty of such crimes". The Chinese embassy in Paris criticized the French government's position as hypocrisy, and argued that Chinese artists have the right to caricature, referencing the French government's defense of the Charlie Hebdo caricatures. A spokesperson for the US State Department likewise accused the Chinese foreign ministry of hypocrisy for using Twitter at all when it is blocked in China. The Taiwanese government expressed concern about the Chinese foreign ministry's use of a manipulated image in an official tweet. A week after the tweet an Israeli cybersecurity firm concluded that they had found "evidence of a largely orchestrated disinformation campaign" aimed at spreading the tweet and China's viewpoint. The firm concluded that of the Twitter accounts which had augmented proliferation of the image, "half were likely fake."

=== Echoing Russian disinformation about Ukraine ===
In March 2022, amidst the 2022 Russian invasion of Ukraine, Zhao Lijian said during a press conference that "the US' biological laboratories in Ukraine have aroused great concern". He echoed Russian media reports saying that Russia has found out that the US was using such facilities for "bio-military plans". However, such claims, which circulated in Russian media since at least 2018, were previously debunked as part of Russian disinformation campaign against Ukraine. Britain's Defense Ministry said: "These narratives are long standing but are currently likely being amplified as part of a retrospective justification for Russia's invasion of Ukraine". Bloomberg News called it a "conspiracy theory". Since the dissolution of the Soviet Union, the U.S. Department of Defense has worked with Ukraine and other former satellites of the USSR to secure and take apart remnant weapons of mass destruction under the Nunn–Lugar Cooperative Threat Reduction program, which involved delivery system dismantlement and tasks pertaining to chemical and biological weapons.

Zhao said that "As the culprit and leading instigator of the Ukraine crisis, the US has led NATO to engage in five rounds of eastward expansion" since 1999, and the near doubling of NATO membership pushed "Russia to the wall step by step."

=== Taiwan ===
In July 2022, Zhao warned that Nancy Pelosi should not travel to Taiwan, and threatened the Chinese government would be "seriously prepared" for her travel. When asked about what that meant, Zhao said that "If the U.S. side is bent on going its own way, China will take strong measures to resolutely respond and counteract" and that "The United States should be held responsible for any serious consequences." On 1 August 2022, Zhao threatened that the Chinese military would not "sit idly by" if Pelosi were to go to Taiwan. Zhao stated that "We would like to tell the United States once again that China is standing by, the Chinese People's Liberation Army will never sit idly by, and China will take resolute responses and strong countermeasures to defend its sovereignty and territorial integrity."

=== 2022 COVID-19 protests ===
In November 2022, after being asked about COVID-19 protests in China that were linked to the 2022 Ürümqi fire, Zhao said "On social media, there are forces with ulterior motives that relate this fire with the local response to COVID-19."

== Personal life ==
Zhao is married to Tang Tianru. According to reports, Tang traveled to Germany when China was under strict travel curbs, triggering an outrage on social media. In December 2022, Tang posted that Zhao was COVID-19 positive, but was unable to get medication.

== See also ==
- Liu Xiaoming
- Xi Jinping Thought on Diplomacy
