= Guobin Yang =

American sociologist

Guobin Yang (Chinese: 杨国斌) is the Grace Lee Boggs Professor of Communication and Sociology at the Annenberg School for Communication and Department of Sociology at the University of Pennsylvania. He is also the Associate Dean for Graduate Studies at the Annenberg School for Communication, Director of the Center on Digital Culture and Society, and deputy director of the Center for the Study of Contemporary China. Yang received his first PhD from Beijing Foreign Studies University in 1993 and his second PhD in sociology from New York University in 2000. His other former positions include being an assistant professor of sociology at the University of Hawaii at Manoa and as an associate professor of Asian and Middle Eastern Cultures at Barnard College of Columbia University.

Yang is a current member of the editorial team for Global Media and Communication. He also serves on the editorial boards for Sociological Forum, Chinese Journal of Sociology, China Information, The China Quarterly, Global Media and China, International Journal of Communication, The International Journal of Press/Politics, and Social Media + Society.

== Research ==
Yang's research is interdisciplinary covering issues in both communication and sociology while focusing on various aspects of social movements, online activism, and online protest which is the use of electronic communication to get information out faster about activism, digital culture, cultural sociology, historical sociology, critical theory which is the theory of applying certain knowledge to unearth a challenge in the power structure much like what Yang has discovered in China, global communication, environmental communication, and media and politics in China. Many of his research papers, journal articles, books, and projects are based on his focuses in China with topics such as the internet and civil society, environmental NGOs (non-governmental organizations), the 1989 Tiananmen Square protests, also known as the student movement, the Red Guard (Red Guards) movement, and collective memories of the Chinese Cultural Revolution. His research projects are mainly in three areas; Chinese culture revolution, the rise of the environmental movement in China, and internet activism. He also has analyzed China's public sphere and showed how the use of the Internet in a social aspect has fostered many public debates.

Yang writes that Wolf Warrior diplomacy and COVID-related nationalism in China should be understood "in the context of an already emerging culture of cybernationalism and global populism."

== Publications ==
=== Books ===
- Dragon-carving and the Literary Mind (Library of Chinese Classics) (2003, translator)
- Re-envisioning the Chinese Revolution: The Politics and Poetics of Collective Memories in Reform China (2007, with Ching Kwan Lee)
- The Power of The Internet in China (2009)
- China's Contested Internet (Governance in Asia) (2015)
- The Red Guard Generation and Political Activism in China (2016)
- The Internet, Social Media, and a Changing China (2016) with Avery Goldstein and Jacques deLisle
- Media Activism in the Digital Age (2017)
- The Party Leads All: The Evolving Role of the Chinese Communist Party (2022) with Jacques deLisle

=== Journal articles ===
Yang has approximately 40 published journal articles which include but are not limited to:

- (2000). "Achieving Emotions in Collective Action: Emotional Processes and movement Mobilization in the 1989 Chinese Student Movement."
- (2003). "The Internet in civil society China: A preliminary assessment."
- (2003). "The co-evolution of the Internet and civil society China."
- (2005). "Environmental NGOs and institutional dynamics in China."
- (2006). "The Internet and Emerging Civil Society in China."
- (2008). "Media, civil society, and the rise of a green public sphere in China"
- (2009). "Online Activism."
- (2010). "Alternative Genres, New Media, and Counter Memories of the Chinese Cultural Revolution."
- (2011). "Internet and Civil Society."
- (2012). "Lightness, wildness, and ambivalence: China and new media studies."
- (2013). "Power and Transgression in the global media age: The strange case of Twitter in China."
- (2014). "Internet Activism and the Party-State in China."
- (2014). "Political contestation in Chinese digital spaces: Deepening the critical inquiry."
- (2015). "The networked practice of online political satire in China: Between ritual and resistance."
- (2016). "Techno-Social Generations and Communication Research."
- (2017). "Activist Media."
- (2017). "Remembering Disappeared Websites in China: Passion, Community, and Youth."
- (2018). "Demobilizing the Emotional of Online Activism in China: A Civilizing Process."
- (2019). "Performing Cyber-Nationalism in Twenty-First Century China."
