= China Daily =

English-language daily newspaper in China

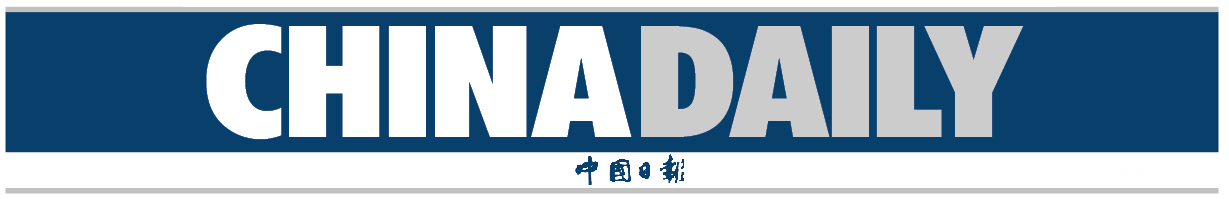

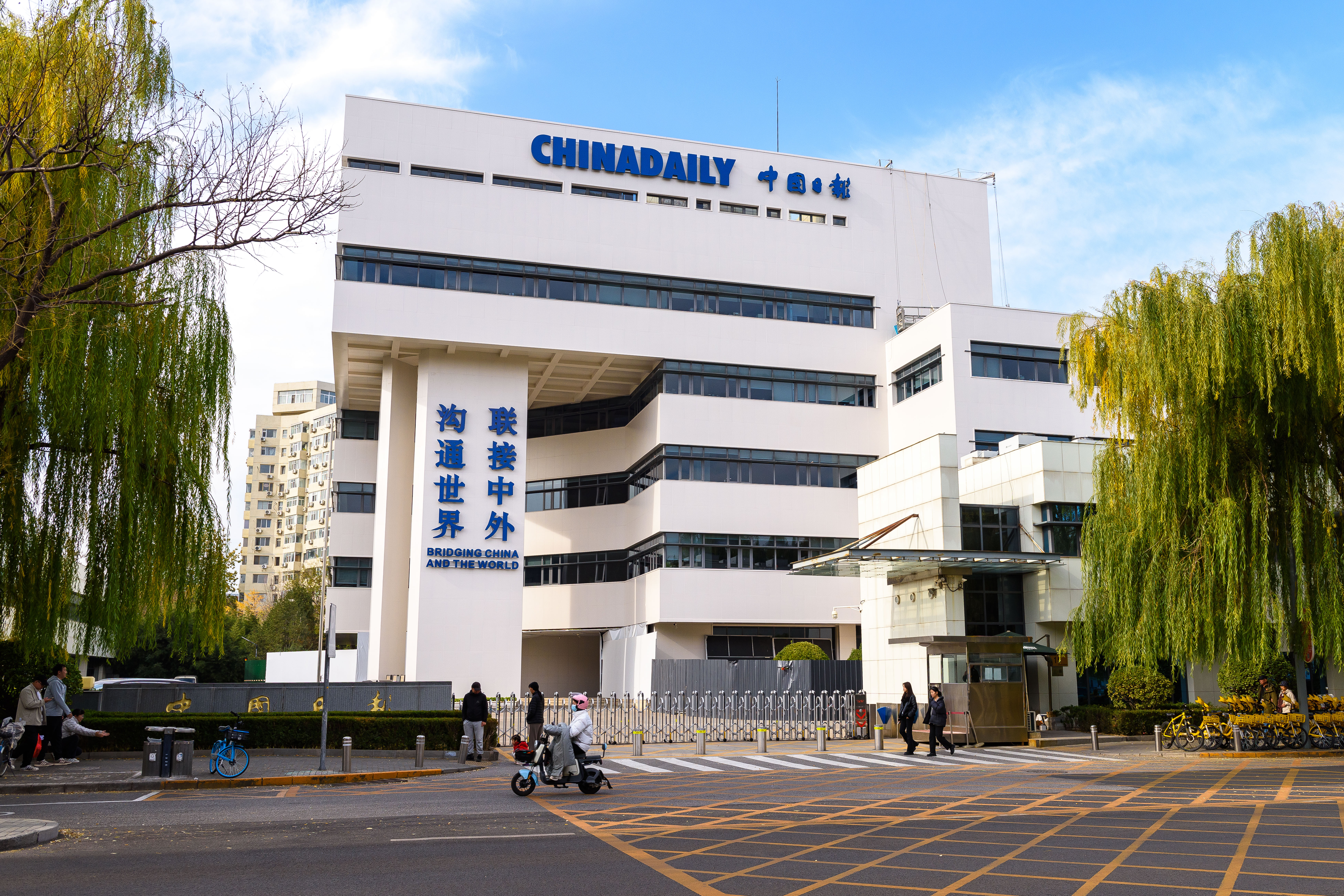
- Headquarters of China Daily in November 2025
- Type: Daily newspaper, state media
- Format: Broadsheet
- Owner: Publicity Department of the Chinese Communist Party
- Editor-in-chief: Qu Yingpu
- Founded: 1 June 1981; 45 years ago
- Language: English
- Headquarters: China: 15 Huixin Street East, Chaoyang District, Beijing; 39.980092°N 116.423802°E; Overseas: 1500 Broadway, Suite 2800; New York, NY 10036; U.S.
- Price: CN¥ 2
- ISSN: 0253-9543
- Website: www.chinadaily.com.cn

Chinese name
- Simplified Chinese: 中国日报
Transcriptions
Standard Mandarin
- Hanyu Pinyin: Zhōngguó Rìbào

China Daily is an English-language daily newspaper published in mainland China, Hong Kong, and internationally, owned by the Publicity Department of the Chinese Communist Party.

== Overview ==
China Daily has the widest print circulation of any English-language newspaper in China. The headquarters and principal editorial office is in the Chaoyang District of Beijing. The newspaper has branch offices in most major cities of China as well as several major foreign cities including New York City, Washington, D.C., London, and Kathmandu. China Daily also produces an insert of sponsored content called China Watch that has been distributed inside other newspapers including, in the past, The New York Times, The Wall Street Journal, The Washington Post, and Le Figaro. China Daily operates a social media brand called "Media Unlocked".

Within mainland China, the newspaper targets primarily diplomats, foreign expatriates, tourists, and locals wishing to improve their English. The China edition also offers program guides to Radio Beijing and television, daily exchange rates, and local entertainment schedules. It has been used as a guide to Chinese government policy and positions of the Chinese Communist Party. Scholar Falk Hartig describes the newspaper and its various international editions as an "instrument of China's public diplomacy."

China Daily's editorial policies have historically been described as slightly more liberal than other Chinese state news outlets. Its coverage of the 1989 Tiananmen Square protests and massacre was overwhelmingly sympathetic to the student protests with many of its journalists joining in at the height of mass demonstrations. The newspaper's coverage of the 2002–2004 SARS outbreak was reported to be more critical, fact-driven, and less laudatory than that of the People's Daily. A 2018 discourse analysis from Uppsala University found that prior to Xi Jinping's accession, many China Daily articles portrayed their government as a particular kind of democracy, with democratic ideals such as the implementation of universal suffrage (in Hong Kong) and grassroots elections sometimes endorsed. After his accession, articles became more negative in tone toward democracy and shifted focus to portraying the "vices" of democracies in the West, particularly the United States.

=== Editorial control ===
Scholars have described China Daily as effectively controlled by the Central Propaganda Department of the Chinese Communist Party. Ideologically, it tends to adopt similar perspectives to the People's Daily. According to its 2014 annual report, China Daily is formally managed by the State Council Information Office (SCIO), which was formed from the Central Propaganda Department in 1991. The SCIO holds regular meetings with journalists and editors from China Daily on what they should publish. In 2014, the SCIO was absorbed into the CCP's Central Propaganda Department. The SCIO has stated that China Daily is "one of our most important tools in carrying out external propaganda".

A former copy-editor (or "polisher" as termed at China Daily) for the newspaper described her role being "to tweak propaganda enough that it read as English, without inadvertently triggering war." Journalist Michael Ottey described his time working for China Daily as "almost like working for a public relations firm" and added "it wasn't really honest journalism. It was more 'Let's make the Chinese government look good.'" Writer Mitch Moxley, who worked at China Daily from 2007 to 2008, wrote in 2013 that many of the articles published in the newspaper's opinion pages "violated everything [he] had ever learned about journalistic ethics, including China Daily's own code: 'Factual, Honest, Fair, Complete.'"

== History ==
China Daily was officially established in June 1981 after a one-month trial. It was initially led by Jiang Muyue, with Liu Zhunqi as editor in chief. It was the first national daily English-language newspaper in China after the establishment of the People's Republic in 1949. Its initial circulation was 22,000, which grew to 65,000 by the following year. The paper was a departure from other Chinese newspapers at the time: it was "a Western-style paper", in content, style, and organizational structure. By July 1982, the newspaper had plans to publish editions in the United States, the United Kingdom, and tentatively Australia. Initially, it struggled to find English-speaking journalists.

China Daily began distribution in North America in 1983. It has been registered as a foreign agent in the United States under the Foreign Agents Registration Act since 1983.

China Daily introduced an online edition in 1996 and a Hong Kong edition in 1997. By 2006, it had a reported circulation of 300,000, of which two thirds were in China and one third international. In 2010, it launched China Daily Asia Weekly, a tabloid-sized pan-Asian edition.

In December 2012, China Daily launched an Africa edition, published in Nairobi, the capital of Kenya. This edition aimed expand the China Daily readership, of both African people and Chinese people who live in Africa, and showcase China's interests in Africa.

In 2015, China Daily published a fake op-ed which the publication claimed was penned by Peter Hessler. They combined part of the transcript of an interview he had done with comments from another person interviewed as well as completely fabricated parts and ran it as an op-ed under Hessler's byline without his knowledge or permission. The fabricated op-ed contained made up praise for China and misrepresented Hessler's own words by taking them out of context. According to the Associated Press, the editorial repeated Chinese Communist Party talking points and China Daily refused to retract it although it subsequently removed the English language version of the op-ed.

In 2018, the paper fabricated a quote by the mayor of Davos, Switzerland, Tarzisius Caviezel.

A January 2020 report by Freedom House, a U.S. non-governmental organization, noted that China Daily had increased its spending from $500,000 in the first half of 2009 to over $5 million in the latter half of 2019 for increased print runs. China Daily said it had a circulation of 300,000 in the U.S. and 600,000 overseas.

In February 2020, a group of U.S. lawmakers asked the United States Department of Justice to investigate China Daily for alleged violations of the Foreign Agents Registration Act. Later the same month, the United States Department of State designated China Daily, along with several other Chinese state media outlets, as foreign missions owned or controlled by the Chinese Communist Party.

In June 2020, China Daily awarded a tender for a "foreign personnel analysis platform" to the Communication University of China to scan social media and automatically flag "false statements and reports on China."

In September 2020, India's Ministry of External Affairs issued a statement saying that comments made by China Daily were falsely attributed to Ajit Doval. In September 2023, the US Department of State accused the Chinese government of information laundering by using a fictitious opinion columnist named "Yi Fan" writing in China Daily and other outlets to present state narratives as "organic sentiment".

In January 2024, China Daily and the Yunnan International Communication Center (ICC), a project of the propaganda department of the Yunnan provincial CCP committee, jointly launched the South and Southeast Asian Media Network. China Daily has continued to partner with other provincial ICCs established by provincial CCP propaganda departments. The publication has also formed partnerships with Renmin University of China, Harbin Institute of Technology, Shandong University, and Huazhong University of Science and Technology.

In March 2025, U.S. congressional Republicans banned the distribution of China Daily on Capitol Hill. The same month in the UK, members of Parliament requested a review of free delivery of China Daily to legislators. In August 2025, the propaganda department of the Shaanxi provincial CCP committee signed a cooperation agreement with China Daily.

== Reception ==
=== Overall ===
In a 2004 journal article, University of Sheffield professor Lily Chen stated that China Daily was "essentially a publicly funded government mouthpiece". Judy Polumbaum stated in the Berkshire Encyclopedia of China (2009) that China Daily "resists definition as a simple mouthpiece" and has a "distinctive, if quixotic, status". In 2009, China Daily was called "the most influential English language national newspaper in China" according to University of St. Thomas scholar Juan Li. It is known for original reporting. Non-governmental organization Reporters Without Borders has accused China Daily of engaging in censorship and propaganda.

In February 2020, The New York Times wrote that China Daily's inserts published in US newspapers "generally offer an informative, if anodyne, view of world affairs refracted through the lens of the Communist Party." Later that year, in response to criticism, The New York Times, The Washington Post, The Daily Telegraph, and Nine Entertainment Co. ceased publishing China Daily's China Watch inserts in their newspapers. In March 2024, US senator Marco Rubio publicly called on The Seattle Times, Houston Chronicle, The Boston Globe, Los Angeles Times, Time, USA Today, Financial Times, Sun Sentinel, and the Chicago Tribune to sever financial ties with China Daily.

A 2025 frame analysis of China Daily articles by Universiti Sains Malaysia researchers found that the outlet blamed the United States as the driving force for the Russian invasion of Ukraine. Observers have noted that the newspaper's in-house AI studio produces commentary videos using generative AI, which have been criticized as "AI slop."

=== Disinformation ===
Media outlets such as The New York Times, NPR, Quartz, and BuzzFeed News have published accounts of China Daily's dissemination of disinformation related to the 2019–2020 Hong Kong protests. In September 2019, China Daily's official Facebook account stated that Hong Kong protesters were planning on launching terrorist attacks on 11 September of the same year.

In May 2020, CNN, Financial Times, and other media outlets reported that China Daily censored references to the origin of the COVID-19 pandemic from an opinion piece authored by European Union ambassadors. In January 2021, China Daily inaccurately attributed deaths in Norway to the Pfizer–BioNTech COVID-19 vaccine. In April 2021, the European External Action Service published a report that cited China Daily and other state media outlets for "selective highlighting" of potential vaccine side-effects and "disregarding contextual information or ongoing research" to present Western vaccines as unsafe. In October 2021, the German Marshall Fund reported that China Daily was one of several state media outlets propagating a conspiracy theory concerning the origins of COVID-19.

In January 2022, China Daily alleged that the U.S. planned to pay athletes to "sabotage" the 2022 Winter Olympics. In March 2022, China Daily published an article in Chinese which falsely claimed that COVID-19 was created by Moderna, citing a page on The Exposé, a British conspiracist website.

=== Portrayal of Muslims ===
A 2019 critical discourse analysis of China Daily's coverage of Chinese Muslims found them to be portrayed as "obedient and dependent Chinese citizens who benefit from the government's intervention." In January 2021, a China Daily article praised a report from the Chinese Academy of Social Sciences, stating that government policies in Xinjiang had "emancipated" the minds of Uyghur women so that they are "no longer baby-making machines". The article drew condemnation as being a justification for reproductive policies which persecute Uyghur people, and sparked calls for Twitter to remove links to the article. Twitter removed a reposting of the China Daily article by the PRC's official U.S. embassy account and subsequently suspended the account for contravening its stated policy against "dehumanization of a group of people".

=== Racism ===
In July 2026, China Daily published and spread an AI-generated video depicting Filipinos as monkeys amid tensions in the South China Sea. The video was published after the anniversary of the 2016 South China Sea Arbitration which legally invalidated the so-called nine-dash line of China. The Department of Foreign Affairs of the Philippines denounced the video as racist and dehumanizing propaganda.

== See also ==
- Chinese information operations and information warfare
- List of newspapers in China
- Mass media in China
- Propaganda in China
