= Wolf warrior diplomacy =

21st-century Chinese diplomatic tactic

- Simplified Chinese: 战狼外交
- Traditional Chinese: 戰狼外交
Transcriptions
Standard Mandarin
- Hanyu Pinyin: Zhànláng Wàijiāo
- Bopomofo: ㄓㄢˋ ㄌㄤˊ ㄨㄞˋ ㄐㄧㄠ

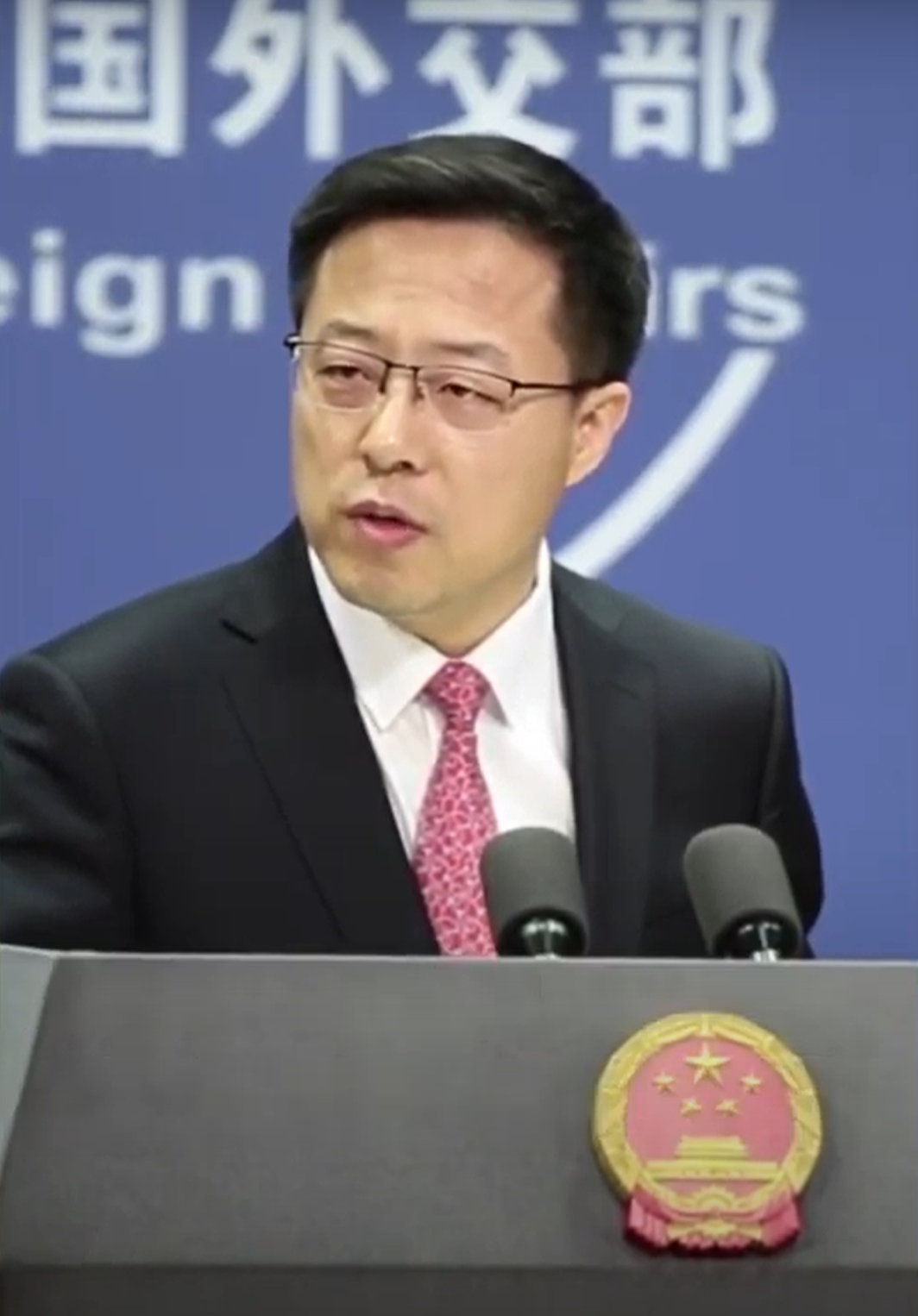
Former Chinese foreign ministry spokesman Zhao Lijian, considered one of the leading "wolf warrior diplomats"

Wolf warrior diplomacy is a confrontational form of public diplomacy adopted by diplomats of the People's Republic of China in the late 2010s and early 2020s. The phrase is derived from the Chinese action film franchise Wolf Warrior (2015) and its 2017 sequel. Analysts have characterized this style of diplomacy as coercive, and in contrast both to the narrative of "China's peaceful rise" and to diplomatic practices which emphasize the use of cooperative rhetoric and the avoidance of controversy (often termed Taoguang Yanghui), financial aid (checkbook diplomacy), the provision of medical supplies such as COVID-19 masks (medical diplomacy), and panda diplomacy.

Wolf warrior diplomacy has been often combative, with its proponents vocally denouncing perceived criticism of the Chinese government, the ruling Chinese Communist Party (CCP), and associated policies on social media and in interviews, sometimes engaging in physical altercations or other forms of compellence with their opponents. Wolf warrior diplomacy has been seen as part of CCP general secretary Xi Jinping's efforts to bolster China's "discourse power" in international politics and a reflection of an ideological struggle with the Western world. Xi's foreign policy in general, perceived anti-China hostility from the West among Chinese government officials, and shifts within the Chinese diplomatic bureaucracy have been cited as factors leading to its emergence. Commentators have observed that wolf warrior diplomacy peaked in the early 2020s and declined afterwards.

== History ==
=== Shift in diplomatic style ===
When Deng Xiaoping came to power following Mao Zedong's death in the late 1970s, he prescribed a foreign policy that he summed up as tāoguāng-yǎnghuì (Chinese: 韬光养晦; lit. 'to conceal one's light and cultivate in the dark'), and emphasized the avoidance of controversy and the use of cooperative rhetoric. This idiom—which originally referred to biding one's time without revealing one's strength—encapsulated Deng's strategy to "observe calmly, secure our position, cope with affairs calmly, hide our capacities and bide our time, be good at maintaining a low profile, and never claim leadership."

In 2009, China began to take notable actions, including increasing fishery activities, sea patrols, military presence, tourism development, and UN claims. While maintaining a diplomatic tone towards neighboring countries, China asserted its determination to protect its territorial integrity. However, remarks about the United States were much harsher, calling its claims "flatly inaccurate" and "sheer lies." This shift marked the beginning of "Chinese assertiveness," especially related to the South China Sea dispute. Around 2010, scholars began to note this shift on China's diplomatic style.

Since 2011, discussions about the South China Sea have grown, with China taking a firmer stance and increasing its activities, while other countries such as the Philippines have responded with legal actions and maritime patrols to assert their claims. US statements about this issue were dismissed as "untrue and irresponsible remarks," portraying the US as a negative foreign influence in the South China Sea.

The sentiment of Chinese official talks about the US can be divided into two periods under Chinese leaders Hu Jintao and Xi Jinping. Before 2012, sentiment improved and peaked in 2011. During the general secretaryship of Xi Jinping, negativity increased, especially after 2018, reaching its lowest point.

While assertive nationalist rhetoric in Chinese public diplomacy existed previously, wolf warrior diplomacy is perceived as a departure from former Chinese foreign policy which focused on working behind the scenes, avoiding controversy and favoring a rhetoric of international cooperation, exemplified by the maxim that China "must hide its strength" in international diplomacy. This shift in public diplomacy can be understood as a tactical change in how the Chinese government and the CCP relate to the rest of the world, and also to their domestic audiences. Due to the Chinese diaspora, China's public diplomacy has been increasingly aimed at Chinese-speaking audiences outside of the PRC.

Xi Jinping Thought on Diplomacy (2017) had legitimized a more active role for China on the world stage, including its engagement in open ideological struggle with the West.

From 2002 to 2020, eleven foreign ministry spokespersons conducted press conferences, with Hua Chunying giving the most responses at more than 4,000 responses followed by Qin Gang, Lu Kang, and Hong Lei at more than 2,000 responses.

=== Prominence ===
The phrase zhan-lang-waijiao (Chinese: 战狼外交; lit. 'wolf warrior diplomacy') entered Chinese media in the latter half of 2019, in the aftermath of a heated exchange on Twitter between Zhao Lijian and Susan Rice on 13 July 2019. In August 2019, Zhao Lijian was promoted to deputy director of China's Information Department of the Ministry of Foreign Affairs. According to analysis of China's diplomacy during the COVID-19 pandemic, wolf warrior diplomacy became more aggressive in recent years as Chinese officials responded more strongly to international criticism.

In February 2020, Zhao Lijian became a spokesperson for the Ministry of Foreign Affairs, and was described by Chinese media as an "Internet celebrity" and a "Wolf Warrior Diplomat".

According to Bloomberg News reporter Peter F. Martin, "After the outbreak of the Covid-19 pandemic, Chinese diplomats felt under attack but also proud of the way that their country has handled the crisis. The new mixture of confidence and increasing insecurity combined to create what we now call wolf warrior diplomacy."

The phrase "Wolf Warrior diplomacy" may have first been used in Western media in May 2020. In Western media since the early-2020s, the phrase "Wolf Warrior diplomacy" has been used to describe any use of confrontational rhetoric by Chinese diplomats, disinformation tactics, coercive behavior, as well as their increased willingness to openly and stridently rebuff criticism of the government and its policies, and court controversy in press conferences, interviews with the foreign press and on social media.

In May 2020, Wang Yi stated that China would "never pick a fight or bully others" but would "push back against any deliberate insult" and "refute all groundless slander." In December, Hua Chunying stated at a press conference, "[H]ow can anyone think that China has no right to speak the truth while they have every right to slander, attack, smear, and hurt China? ... Do they think that China has no choice but the silence of the lambs while they are unscrupulously lashing out at the country with trumped-up charges?"

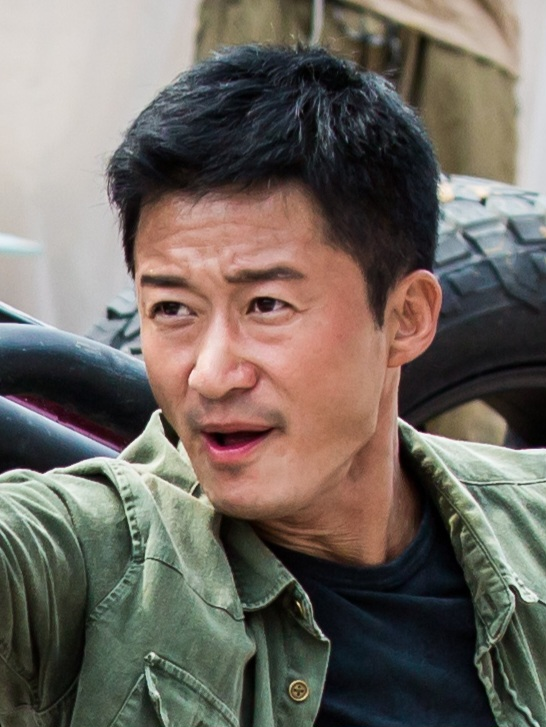
Wu Jing on the set of Wolf Warrior 2

In December 2020, at an address to a conference at Renmin University in Beijing, Foreign Minister Le Yucheng was reported, in Western media, as defending the use of "rhetorical tit-for-tat" as a way of "solving the problems of being scolded" by other countries. He criticized Western media for its use of the phrase "Wolf Warrior" to describe Chinese diplomats who deployed such aggressive rhetoric. He said that foreign countries "are coming to our doorstep, interfering in our family affairs, constantly nagging at us, insulting and discrediting us, [so] we have no choice but to firmly defend our national interests and dignity."

=== Decline ===
In 2021, in response to a perceived deterioration of China's international reputation in a reaction to wolf warrior diplomacy, CCP general secretary Xi Jinping called for improvements in the country's international communication at a May 2021 CCP Politburo group study session. Several other events in 2021 were interpreted by The Diplomat as evidence "that leaders in Beijing are recalibrating China's external messaging, signaling to the wolf warriors that a gradual softening of tone is in order," including the departure of Hu Xijin, editor of the CCP-owned tabloid Global Times, an early adopter of wolf warrior rhetoric. Since the Politburo meeting, Chinese officials started toning down public statements, while social media accounts related to the foreign ministry became less confrontational.

In 2022, Le Yucheng was transferred from the Ministry of Foreign Affairs, where he had served as executive vice minister since 2018, to a deputy directorship at the National Radio and Television Administration. Another pullback from China's official support for Wolf Warrior diplomacy occurred in January 2023, when Zhao Lijian became the deputy director of Department of Boundary and Ocean Affairs Department, thus ending his tenure as an official spokesperson for the Ministry of Foreign Affairs. Academics Lize Yang and Hai Yang describe Zhao's reassignment as signaling China's effort to decrease the wolf warrior approach.

Two undated US Joint Chiefs of Staff briefings leaked in 2023 wrote that China has been transitioning away from wolf warrior diplomacy to a "more measured approach", in part to divide the European Union (EU) from the US, though it assessed these measures have been failing, basing this on conversations with European officials in March 2023.

In September 2024, international relations scholar Shaoyu Yuan argued that China has shifted from its assertive wolf warrior diplomacy to a more accommodating diplomatic approach, primarily motivated by domestic economic challenges, including a slowing economy. This transition underscores China's need for global economic stability to maintain its growth and development.

According to a research by The Economist, more belligerent answers by the foreign ministry spokespersons increased sharply after 2019, then started declining steadily after 2022. It said that, by the beginning of 2025, the level of belligerent answers had declined to 2018 levels.

== Causes ==
Several factors supportive of a growth in Wolf Warrior diplomacy have been noted by analysts in the years since Zhao Lijian's rise to prominence as an acknowledged "Wolf Warrior Diplomat" in 2019.

The story of China's former Ambassador to France, Wu Jianmin, having had the French Embassy's dogs set on him as a child in Nanjing, has been used as a justification for aggressive "Wolf Warrior" diplomatic language.

In some analyses, the use of Wolf Warrior rhetoric and tactics have been a Chinese response to its fear of "ideological designs" from the West, to its perception of increased "anti-China hostility" or of increased threats to national stability. Some saw a promotion of the Wolf Warrior as part of a "national rejuvenation".

Some analysts point out that a younger cadre of diplomats have now worked their way up the ranks of the Chinese diplomatic service and that this is causing a generational shift in diplomatic style, such as an increased use of social media such as Twitter. Academic Guobin Yang writes that Wolf Warrior diplomacy should be understood "in the context of an already emerging culture of cybernationalism and global populism."

Some analysts point to the importance of Wolf Warrior diplomacy in the domestic politics of China, as a way of appeasing nationalistic youth who decry the "flaccid tone" of less-aggressive Chinese diplomacy. The contradiction between Chinese ideas and socialism and Western ideas and capitalism features heavily in some domestic discussions of wolf warrior diplomacy. Some Western analysts argue that the diplomatic stance of China has increasingly pivoted toward an adversarial relationship with the West in recent decades.

Wolf warrior diplomacy has also been described as a method for "Beijing to manage and employ nationalist public opinion at the domestic level." In 2023, journalist Peter Martin asserted that although "many Chinese diplomats are aware that the response to wolf warrior diplomacy has been very negative and actually damaged China's interests in a wide range of cases...those who have misgivings need to keep their thoughts to themselves for now, or they will face political repercussions." Martin noted the trend "as during previous periods of assertive diplomacy from China, the primary audience is domestic politicians. Therefore, the reaction of foreigners and outsiders is not a top motivator for Chinese diplomats".

Through a qualitative analysis of 4,556 MFA press conference question and answer dyads from 2020 to 2024, academics Lize Yang and Hai Yang conclude that aggressive questioning by foreign journalists was more likely to elicit a wolf warrior response, "particularly in a political climate characterized by increasing Western criticism of China." Some scholars also argue that wolf warrior diplomacy is aimed at domestic audiences within China, where strong and confrontational messaging can reinforce nationalism and demonstrate that the government is defending the country against foreign criticism.

== Proponents and practices ==
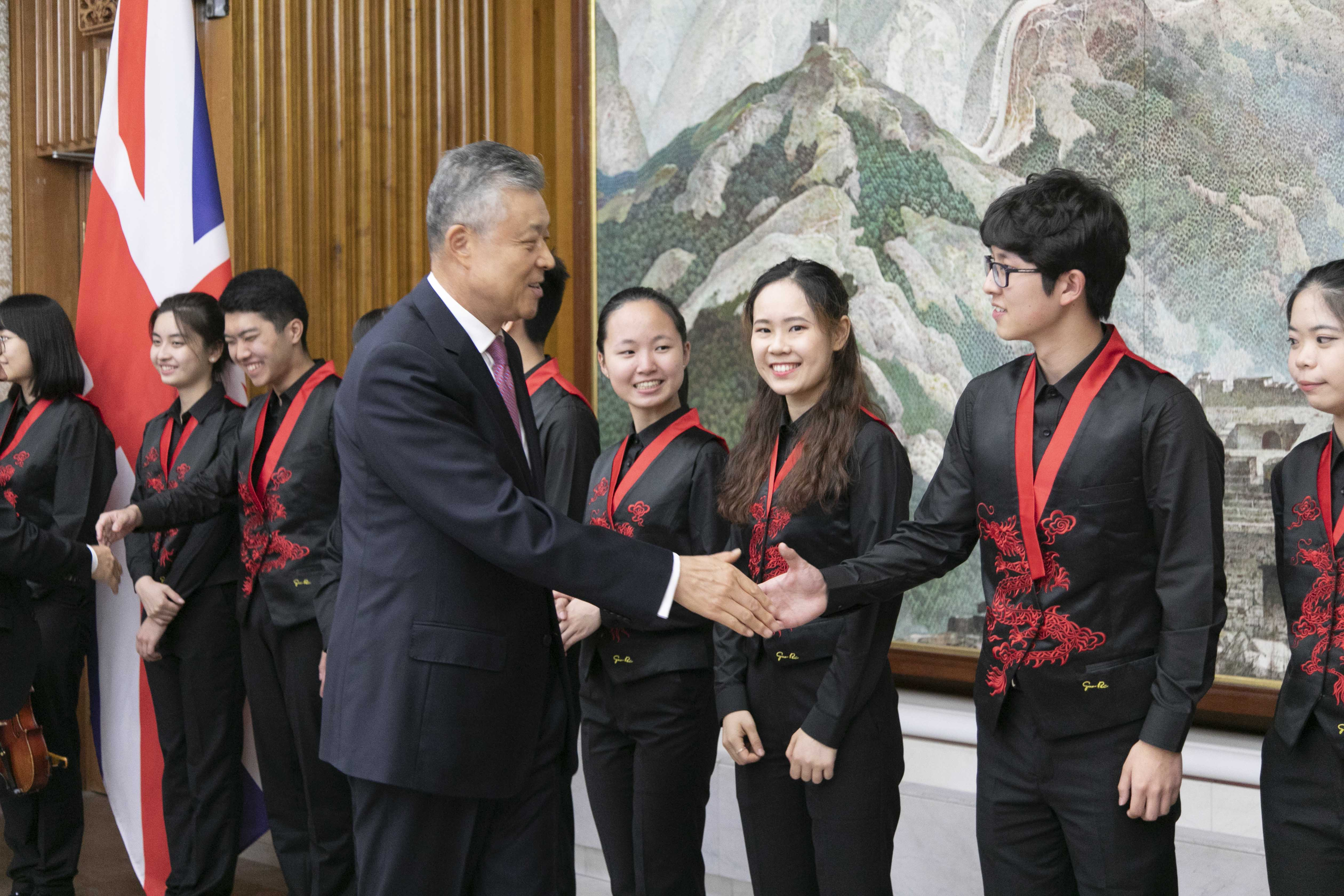
NYO-China members with Liu Xiaoming at the Embassy of China, London

Aside from China's leader Xi Jinping himself, both the Chinese foreign affairs and the state media/propaganda system have prominent proponents of "wolf warrior" diplomacy or its style of communication. These include Ministry of Foreign Affairs spokespeople and diplomats Zhao Lijian, Hua Chunying, Wang Wenbin, Liu Xiaoming, and CCP-owned Global Times columnist Hu Xijin. The Chinese Ambassador to France, Lu Shaye, drew sustained international criticism for his public remarks. Suisheng Zhao writes that the rise of this style of diplomacy reflects China's growing national strength and a changed international environment.

Chinese diplomats who favor wolf warrior diplomacy view it as a natural response to perceived Western efforts to contain China, its people and their aspirations, along with the issues raised by Western diplomats that the Chinese diplomats see as nitpicking criticisms of China.

The Chinese government believed that the reason for the diplomacy was due to stated interference of Western media in China's domestic affairs. Many Chinese diplomats such as former Vice Foreign Minister Fu Ying expressed the need of being a "wolf-warrior" in cases of "foreign interference". In 2023, Foreign Minister Qin Gang criticized the "wolf warrior" tag as a "narrative trap" by people who knew nothing about China.

=== Economic coercion ===
Victor Cha of the Center for Strategic and International Studies stated that there were 16 nations and over 120 global companies that had been subject to economic coercion from China through trade boycotts, punitive tariffs and "weaponizing" trade interdependence between 2008 and 2022. China has used trade to coerce countries such as Australia, imposing unofficial embargoes on the importation of Australian coal, along with prohibitive tariffs on Australian barley and wine as a punishment for the then Australian Prime Minister Scott Morrison's call for an inquiry on the origins of COVID-19. One business that has been coerced is the NBA, with China suspending broadcasts of Houston Rockets games, because the Rockets' then General Manager Daryl Morey had tweeted his support for the pro-democracy protesters during the 2019–2020 Hong Kong protests. Shaoyu Yuan noted that tourism serves as another strategic economic lever for China to influence other nations. The substantial economic impact of Chinese tourists makes a potential tourism boycott a potent form of pressure. For instance, following South Korea's decision to implement the U.S. THAAD missile defense system, China informally prohibited group tours to South Korea. This action led to a notable decrease in tourist numbers and adversely affected South Korea's economy.

== Examples ==
=== 2018 APEC summit ===
When Papua New Guinea hosted the APEC Summit in 2018, four Chinese diplomats barged in uninvited on Rimbink Pato, Papua New Guinea's foreign minister, arguing for changes to the communiqué proclaiming "unfair trade practices" which they felt targeted China. The bilateral discussion was rebuffed as bilateral negotiations with an individual delegation would jeopardise the country's neutrality as host.

=== Chinese embassy in Sweden ===
In November 2019, Ambassador Gui Congyou threatened Sweden during an interview with broadcaster Swedish PEN saying that "We treat our friends with fine wine, but for our enemies we got shotguns", over the decision to award Gui Minhai with the Tucholsky Prize. All eight major Swedish political parties condemned the Ambassador's threats. On 4 December, after the prize had been awarded, Ambassador Gui said that one could not both harm China's interests and benefit economically from China. When asked to clarify his remarks he said that China would impose trade restrictions on Sweden, these remarks were backed up by the Chinese Foreign Ministry in Beijing. The embassy has systematically worked to influence the reporting on China by Swedish journalists. In April 2021 it was revealed that the Chinese embassy threatened a journalist working for the newspaper Expressen. Several political parties publicly expressed that they believe the ambassador should be declared persona non grata and deported on the basis that his actions violated the constitution of Sweden. Within Gui's first two years of the ambassadorship, Sweden's Foreign Ministry summoned him over forty times to protest Gui's remarks.

=== 2020 Zhao Lijian image incident ===
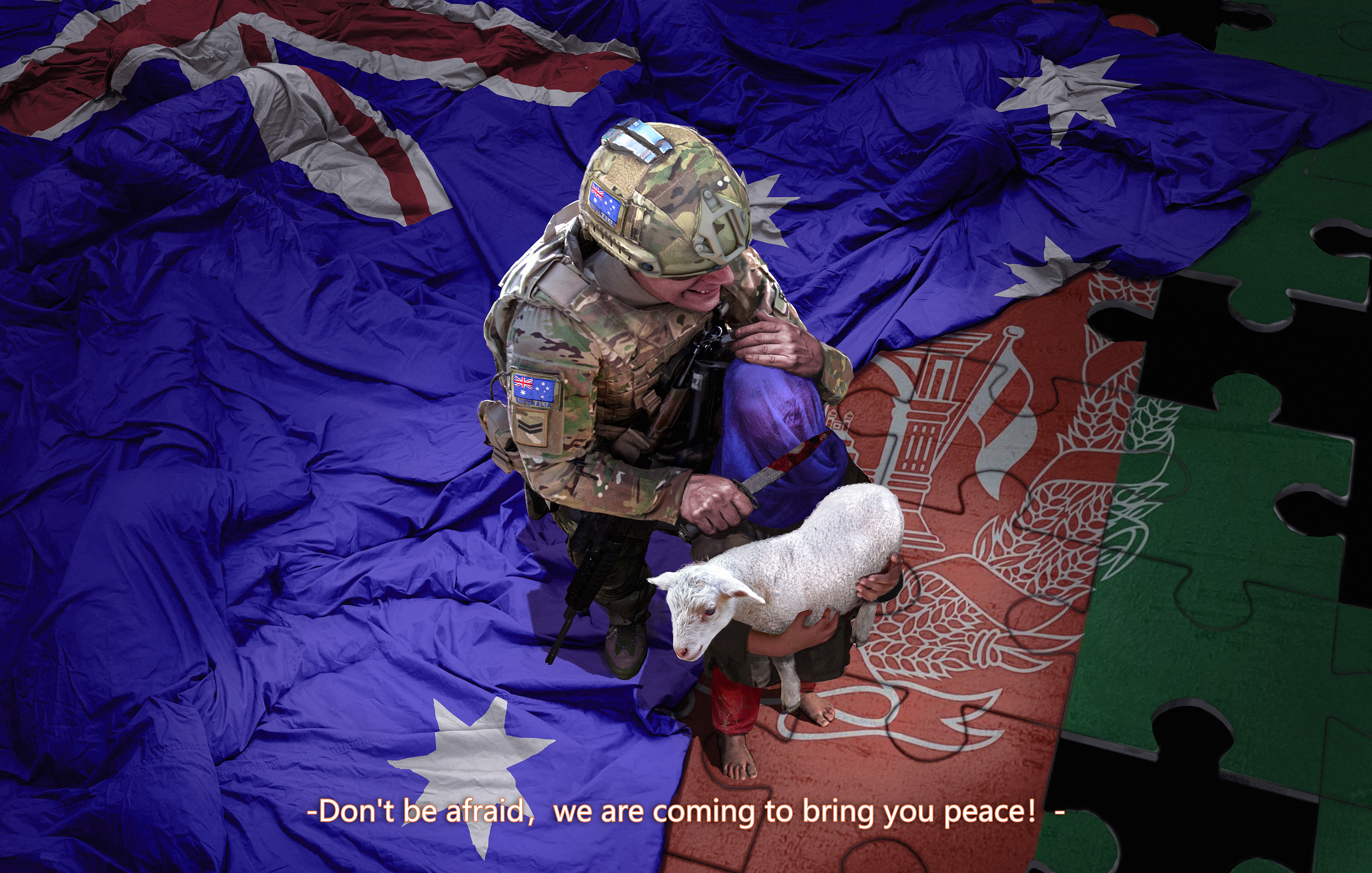
Wuheqilin's digitally created image, titled Peace Force (和平之师)

In late 2020, Chinese foreign ministry spokesman Zhao Lijian used his Twitter account to circulate a computer graphics art piece by Wuheqilin, a self-styled "Chinese wolf warrior artist". Created in response to the release of the Brereton Report, the image depicted an Australian soldier cutting the throat of an Afghan child and the words "Don't be afraid, we are coming to bring you peace". Global commentators called the tweet "a sharp escalation" in the dispute between China and Australia.

Reuters reported Australian Prime Minister Scott Morrison describing Zhao's tweet as "truly repugnant" and stating that "the Chinese government should be utterly ashamed of this post. It diminishes them in the world's eyes." The next day, the Chinese foreign ministry rejected Australian demands for an apology. The incident was damaging to Australia–China relations. The effect of Zhao's tweet has been to unify Australian politicians across party lines in condemning the incident and China more generally.

=== Chinese embassy in France ===
The Ambassador to France, Lu Shaye, was summoned twice by the French foreign ministry, first in April 2020 over posts and tweets by the embassy defending Beijing's response to the COVID-19 pandemic and criticising the West's handling of it, then in March 2021 over "insults and threats" over new economic sanctions placed on China for its crackdown against the Uyghur minority. Previously as Ambassador to Canada, Shaye accused Canadian media of "Western egotism and white supremacy" and disparaged their work on the ground that they are in a lesser position to judge China's development compared to the Chinese people. He also regularly complained of the "biased" and "slanderous" character of their articles denouncing the persecution of Uyghurs.

Lu has earned a reputation as a wolf-warrior diplomat, which he is proud of. In August 2022, Lu suggested that Taiwan's populace would be "re-educated" after unification. Lu garnered international outcry after questioning the sovereignty of "post-Soviet states" in 2023, forcing Chinese officials to denounce the statement as "personal opinion".

=== Altercation at ROC National Day event in Fiji ===
In October 2020, a Taiwanese official was hospitalized for head injuries after an altercation with two diplomats from the Chinese embassy in Fiji at an event where Fijian and Taiwanese officials were celebrating National Day of the Republic of China (ROC). According to The Guardian, "Taiwan's ministry of foreign affairs said two Chinese embassy officials arrived at the Grand Pacific Hotel uninvited and began "harassing" and trying to photograph the guests which included Fijian ministers, foreign diplomats, NGO representatives and members of Fiji's ethnic Chinese community" and a fight broke out when the pair was confronted by Taiwanese staff. Taipei also alleged that the Chinese diplomats had falsely told Fijian police they were attacked. The Chinese embassy in Suva claimed that a Chinese diplomat was injured in the altercation and accused staff of the Taipei Trade Office in Fiji of having acted proactively against staff outside the venue. These statements were reiterated by China's foreign ministry spokesman Zhao Lijian.

=== 2020 Olympics ===
Chinese diplomats engaged in wolf warrior diplomacy during the 2020 Olympics with issue being taken with the way Chinese athletes were being depicted by the media and by the Taiwanese team being introduced as "Taiwan" instead of Chinese Taipei. The Chinese consulate in New York City complained that NBC had used an inaccurate map of China in their coverage because it didn't include Taiwan and the South China Sea.

=== 2025-2026 China–Japan diplomatic crisis ===
In November 2025, Japanese Prime Minister Sanae Takaichi made comments about Japanese involvement in a war over Taiwan. The PRC consul general in Osaka, Xue Jian shared a news article about her comments on the social media platform X, stating "the dirty neck that sticks itself in must be cut off." The Japanese Foreign Ministry condemned the remarks, with Chief Cabinet Secretary Minoru Kihara calling the post "extremely inappropriate". Xue deleted the post. In the days after the post, various media sources described it as an example of Wolf Warrior diplomacy. The Chinese Ministry of Foreign Affairs described Xue's post as a personal post "directed at the erroneous and dangerous remarks that attempt to separate Taiwan from China's territory and advocate military intervention in the Taiwan Strait."

=== Chinese embassy in the Philippines ===
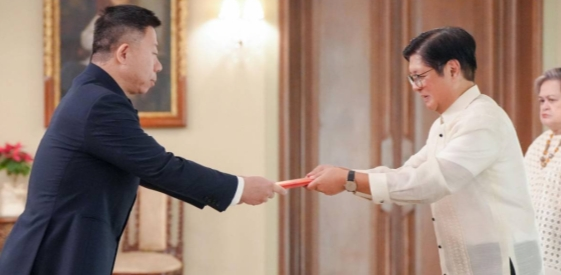
Philippine President Bongbong Marcos receives the credentials of Jing Quan as Chinese ambassador, December 11, 2025

During the ambassadorship of Jing Quan, the Chinese embassy had been reportedly posting and making public criticisms in social media against Philippine senior officials such as Filipino senators Risa Hontiveros, Kiko Pangilinan, Philippine representatives Leila de Lima and Chel Diokno. Since January 2026, Guo Wei, spokesperson of the Chinese embassy in the Philippines, had been making lengthy comments tagging Philippine officials. In one post, the Chinese embassy rejected a statement by the Philippines' National Maritime Council, which reiterates China's "illegal claims" on the West Philippine Sea, stating that the Philippines have been "provoking trouble" over the South China Sea since 1999. On Facebook, the embassy had made at least 15 posts over the course of three weeks in January, mostly attacking Philippine officials over the South China Sea dispute.

That same month, the Chinese embassy filed a diplomatic protest to the Philippine Department of Foreign Affairs against Philippine Coast Guard's WPS spokesman Jay Tarriela for his online post featuring caricatures of Chinese president Xi Jinping. The move was supported by China's Foreign Ministry with spokesperson Guo Jiakun stating that: "The Philippine side has long turned a blind eye to its Coast Guard 'spokesperson' making inflammatory, confrontational, misleading and baseless remarks against China on maritime issues," further adding that this is the time for the Philippines to "undo the negative impact as soon as possible." Ever since the diplomatic protest, Tarriela had been in heated online exchange with the Chinese embassy, which further accused him of "lying". In support of him, 15 Filipino senators signed a senate resolution condemning the Chinese embassy. Embassy spokesperson Ji Lingpeng reacted that the resolution "doesn't work", questioning whether Philippine officials actually know the Vienna Convention on Diplomatic Relations' "provisions, its spirit, and its essential principles."

== Responses ==
=== Domestic ===
China's wolf warrior diplomacy has been positively received by domestic Chinese audiences. According to an Australian scholar writing in 2021, "'Wolf Warrior' rhetoric is popular inside China among the extreme nationalist voices often found online. These typically young voices have long called for Chinese officials to be less 'submissive' in the international arena, even joking that diplomats should be given calcium tablets so they can grow some backbone." The assertive styles of Wang Yi, Hua Chunying, Zhao Lijian, Lu Kang, Geng Shuang, and Wang Wenbin resulted in popularity among some Chinese internet users as the "Super Band of Chinese Diplomats".

Within China's foreign policy establishment, older personnel tend to disfavor the wolf warrior approach. As of at least 2024, some Western analysts assert that opposition to Wolf Warrior tactics is still a minority view within the foreign policy establishment, despite the 2023 demotion of Zhao and Xi Jinping's May 2021 speech to the 30th collective study session of the CCP Politburo.

=== International ===
Internationally, wolf warrior diplomacy has, generally, garnered a negative response and in some cases has provoked a backlash against China and specific diplomats. By 2020, The Wall Street Journal was reporting that the rise of wolf warrior diplomacy had left many politicians and businesspeople feeling targeted. In December 2020, Nicolas Chapuis, an ambassador of the European Union to China, warned: "What happened during the last year [...] is a massive disruption or reduction in support in Europe, and elsewhere in the world, about China. And I'm telling that to all my Chinese friends, you need to seriously look at it." Indeed, when the Pandemic started, and China received international criticism for its pandemic management practices, it mobilized its diplomats to counter negative stories about China and its Covid pandemic management. Some analysts argue that wolf warrior diplomacy can be counterproductive, as its aggressive tone may damage China's international reputation and reduce trust with other countries. While it can strengthen domestic nationalism, it may make cooperation with foreign governments more difficult.

=== Taiwan ===
When the Chinese government threatened Miloš Vystrčil, the president of the Czech Senate, for addressing Taiwan's national legislature, Řeporyje Mayor Pavel Novotný called Chinese Foreign Minister Wang Yi a Chinese "wolf warrior diplomat".

In 2023, Chen Yonglin, a former Chinese diplomat who defected to Australia in 2005, said "Taiwan has benefited from China's 'wolf warrior' diplomacy."

Taiwanese then-representative to the United States Hsiao Bi-khim has been described as a "cat warrior" and has started using the term herself. Cat warrior diplomacy is seen as focusing on the soft power aspects of Taiwan's advanced economy, democracy, and respect for human rights as well as using Chinese aggression to highlight the differences between their two political systems.

=== Bondaz effect ===
Wolf warrior diplomacy has been described as counterproductive by an IRSEM report in September 2021, introducing the "Bondaz effect" concept by using a case from March 2021 when Antoine Bondaz, a French researcher intervened against the pressure exerted by Lu Shaye, the Chinese ambassador to France, on Twitter to dissuade French senators from traveling to Taiwan. In response, he was described as a "small-time thug" by the embassy, prompting immediate condemnation from many researchers, journalists and politicians who expressed their support for Antoine Bondaz. This case was presented by the IRSEM report as an example of wolf warrior diplomacy, demonstrating the perverse effect of this strategy of influence, the embassy having drawn attention to the work of Antoine Bondaz by wanting to discredit him.

The embassy published a press release on its website in which Antoine Bondaz was described as a "mad hyena" and an "ideological troll". The Global Times internationalized the affair by publishing several articles in English supporting the ambassador and attacking again Antoine Bondaz. He denounced "an all-out, coordinated attack, mobilizing the means of the [Chinese] State to seek to discredit [him] and silence [him]."

In three days, Antoine Bondaz gained more than 3,000 followers on Twitter, gave numerous interviews to the press, radio and television. The affair weakened the embassy's partnerships and stirred up diplomatic tensions between China and France. It was part of a sequence from 15 to 22 March 2021 with "disastrous" consequences for China's public image in France and contributed increasing the awareness of political leaders and the French population on the practices of Chinese authorities.

== See also ==
- Clash at the Consulate General of China, Manchester
- Hurting the feelings of the Chinese people
- Place in the sun
