= Avery Goldstein =

American political scientist (born 1954)

Avery M. Goldstein
- Other name: 金骏远
- Organizations: FPRI; Christopher H. Browne Center for International Politics, University of Pennsylvania

Academic background
- Education: University of Pennsylvania (BA, MS); University of California, Berkeley (MA, PhD)
- Thesis: A Theory of Politics in the People's Republic of China: Structural Constraints on Political Behavior and Outcomes, 1949-1978 (system, Bandwagon, Balance-of-Power) (1986)

Academic work
- School or tradition: Realism (international relations)
- Institutions: University of Pennsylvania
- Main interests: Political science; International relations; Chinese foreign policy

Avery Mark Goldstein (born 1954) is the David M. Knott Professor Emeritus of Global Politics and International Relations at the University of Pennsylvania, the associate director of the Christopher H. Browne Center for International Politics, and a senior fellow at the Foreign Policy Research Institute in Philadelphia. His research focuses on international relations theory, strategic studies, and Chinese foreign policy.

== Education ==
Goldstein holds a BA in political science (1975) and a MS in secondary education (1976) from the University of Pennsylvania, as well as a MA (1978) and PhD (1985) in political science from UC Berkeley.

== Academic career ==
Goldstein joined University of Pennsylvania as an assistant professor of political science in 1985. In 2009, he was appointed David M. Knott Professor of Global Politics and International Relations.

== Selected publications ==
- Goldstein, Avery (1991). From Bandwagon to Balance-of-Power Politics: Structural Constraints and Politics in China, 1949-1978. Stanford University Press. ISBN 9780804718509.
- Goldstein, Avery (2000). Deterrence and Security in the 21st Century: China, Britain, France, and the Enduring Legacy of the Nuclear Revolution. Stanford University Press. ISBN 9780804737364.
- Goldstein, Avery (2005). Rising to the Challenge: China's Grand Strategy and International Security. Stanford University Press. ISBN 9780804751384.
- Goldstein, Avery (2020). "China's Grand Strategy under Xi Jinping: Reassurance, Reform, and Resistance". International Security. 45 (1): 164–201. doi:10.1162/isec_a_00383.
- deLisle, Jacques; Goldstein, Avery, eds. (2014). China's Challenges. University of Pennsylvania Press. JSTOR j.ctt9qh43f.
- deLisle, Jacques; Goldstein, Avery; Yang, Guobin, eds. (2016). The Internet, Social Media, and a Changing China. University of Pennsylvania Press. ISBN 9780812223514. JSTOR j.ctt1b3t8nr.
- deLisle, Jacques; Goldstein, Avery, eds. (2017). China's Global Engagement: Cooperation, Competition, and Influence in the 21st Century. Brookings Institution Press. ISBN 9780815729693. JSTOR 10.7864/j.ctt1hfr0wn.
- deLisle, Jacques; Goldstein, Avery (2019). To Get Rich Is Glorious: Challenges Facing China's Economic Reform and Opening at Forty. Brookings Institution Press. ISBN 9780815737254. JSTOR 10.7864/j.ctvbd8m70.
- deLisle, Jacques; Goldstein, Avery, eds. (2021). After Engagement: Dilemmas in U.S.-China Security Relations. Brookings Institution Press. JSTOR 10.7864/j.ctv11hpt2r.
