= Public diplomacy of China =

Soon after its founding, the People's Republic of China institutionalized its concept of public diplomacy, termed "people's diplomacy," which it expressed through the slogan, "influence the policy through the people." The PRC sent doctors, scientists, and athletes to other developing countries to develop connections. This form of people's diplomacy was typically conducted via the International Department of the Chinese Communist Party. Other public diplomacy mechanisms of the Chinese Communist Party and Chinese state have included translations of Chinese works and foreign language magazines, sister city agreements, Confucius Institutes, international communication centers.

== Mechanisms ==
Soon after its founding, the People's Republic of China institutionalized its view of public diplomacy as "people's diplomacy" (renmin waijiao). People's diplomacy was expressed through the slogan, "influence the policy through the people." Pursuant to its people's diplomacy, China sent doctors, scientists, and athletes to developing countries in Asia to cultivate ties. This form of people's diplomacy was often executed through the Chinese Communist Party's International Liaison Department.

At its inception, the PRC viewed translating Chinese works as an important part of its cultural diplomacy. During the Mao era, the government emphasized distributing foreign language works such as China Pictorial, China Reconstructs, and Peking Review. Other mechanisms of cultural diplomacy included the Oriental Song and Dance Troupe.

People's diplomacy with the capitalist countries sought to cultivate informal, non-state ties in the hope of developing "foreign friends" who would lobby their governments to improve relations with China. In the context of China-United States relations, one of the most prominent instances of people's diplomacy was the ping-pong diplomacy which arose following a conversation between Chinese and American players at the 1971 World Championships in Nagoya, Japan. China's approach to keeping these exchanges unofficial and conduct them through non-governmental agencies was generally well received by U.S. civil society groups and academics.

Sister city initiatives are an increasingly widespread mechanism for Chinese public diplomacy. From the early 2000s until 2024, the number of China's sister city relationships doubled. More than one-third of Chinese sister city relationships are with sister cities in the east Asia Pacific region.

The People's Daily has described Confucius Institutes as a form of public diplomacy.

Starting in the late 2010s, wolf warrior diplomacy has been described as a confrontational form of public diplomacy adopted by PRC diplomats, often involving compellence.

Chinese public diplomacy frequently emphasizes principles of national sovereignty and non-interference in countries' domestic affairs.

=== International communications centers ===
International communication centers (ICC, Chinese: 国际传播中心) are state media institutions established by provinces and cities of the People's Republic of China. They operate under the supervision of the Central Propaganda Department of the Chinese Communist Party, with state media outlets such as China Daily, Xinhua News Agency, and China News Service providing infrastructure and serving as a partner to many. The first ICCs were established in 2018 in response to General Secretary of the Chinese Communist Party Xi Jinping's call to "innovate" foreign-directed propaganda. According to Qiushi, the theoretical journal of the Chinese Communist Party (CCP), ICCs are "developed based on local propaganda needs" and aim to be a "new force" in the party's global propaganda ecosystem.

ICCs have been described as part of the PRC's soft power initiatives and have represented a shift from foreign-directed propaganda being created at mostly the central government level to creation and dissemination by the country's provincial and local governments. According to Gary D. Rawnsley, ICCs were created with the strategy that China's foreign-directed propaganda desired more tailored and issue-specific messaging. Certain ICCs have specific geographic and country targets for their messaging and act as fusion centers for pooling jurisdictional media resources. They are known to leverage overseas institutional partners to increase their reach and use foreign influencers for astroturfing purposes.

== See also ==
- Foreign relations of China
- History of foreign relations of China
- Foreign policy of China
- Soft power of China
- Telling China's stories well
