= Jacques deLisle =

American academic and professor (born 1961)

- Born: June 21, 1961 (age 65)
- Other name: 戴杰
- Education: Princeton University (BA); Harvard University (JD)
- Occupations: Political scientist, legal scholar
- Employer(s): University of Pennsylvania, Foreign Policy Research Institute

Jacques deLisle (born June 21, 1961) is an American legal scholar and sinologist. He specializes in the study of Chinese law and politics, China's international relations, and cross-strait relations. He is the Stephen A. Cozen Professor of Law at the University of Pennsylvania, where he is also a professor of political science.

DeLisle is Director of the Center for the Study of Contemporary China at the University of Pennsylvania, co-editor-in-chief of the American Journal of Comparative Law, a member of the U.S. State Department's Advisory Council on International Law, a titular member of the International Academy of Comparative Law, former President of the American Association for Chinese Studies and Chair of the Asia Program at the Foreign Policy Research Institute.

== Education and career ==
DeLisle graduated summa cum laude from Princeton University with a Bachelor of Arts in international affairs in 1982. He then earned his Juris Doctor, magna cum laude, from Harvard Law School in 1990 and completed research towards a doctorate, all but dissertation, at the Harvard Graduate School of Arts and Sciences. He clerked for Chief Judge (later Justice) Stephen Breyer of the U.S. Court of Appeals for the First Circuit before working for the Office of Legal Counsel at the U.S. Department of Justice. In 1994, deLisle joined the University of Pennsylvania faculty as an assistant professor of law. He was promoted to full professor in 1999, and became Stephen A. Cozen Professor of Law in 2006. In 2010, deLisle received a secondary appointment as professor of political science.

== Selected publications ==
- deLisle, Jacques; Goldstein, Avery, eds. (2014). China's Challenges. University of Pennsylvania Press. ISBN 978-0-8122-2312-5. JSTOR j.ctt9qh43f.
- deLisle, Jacques; Goldstein, Avery; Yang, Guobin, eds. (2016). The Internet, Social Media, and a Changing China. University of Pennsylvania Press. ISBN 9780812223514. JSTOR j.ctt1b3t8nr.
- deLisle, Jacques; Goldstein, Avery, eds. (2017). China's Global Engagement: Cooperation, Competition, and Influence in the 21st Century. Brookings Institution Press. ISBN 9780815729693. JSTOR 10.7864/j.ctt1hfr0wn.
- deLisle, Jacques; Goldstein, Avery (2019). To Get Rich Is Glorious: Challenges Facing China's Economic Reform and Opening at Forty. Brookings Institution Press. ISBN 9780815737254. JSTOR 10.7864/j.ctvbd8m70.
- deLisle, Jacques; Goldstein, Avery, eds. (2021). After Engagement: Dilemmas in U.S.-China Security Relations. Brookings Institution Press. ISBN 978-0-8157-3835-0. JSTOR 10.7864/j.ctv11hpt2r.
- deLisle, Jacques; Yang, Guobin, eds. (2022). The Party Leads All: The Evolving Role of the Chinese Communist Party. Brookings Institution Press. ISBN 9780815739517.
