= Wuheqilin =

Chinese illustrator

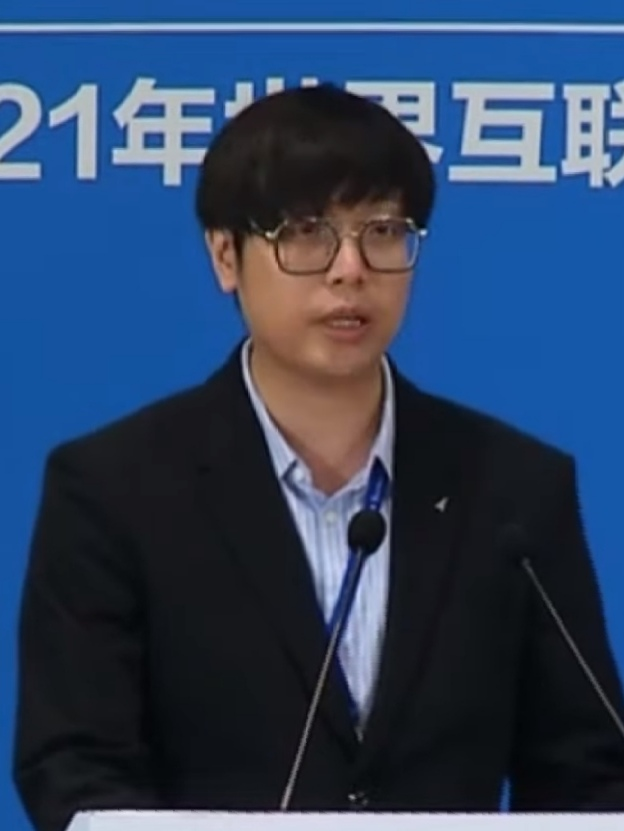
- Born: Fu Yu (付昱); 22 July 1988 (age 37); Shangzhi, Heilongjiang, China
- Occupation: Artist

Fu Yu (Chinese: 付昱; born 22 July 1988), known professionally as Wuheqilin (Chinese: 乌合麒麟; pinyin: Wū Hé Qí Lín; lit. 'Rabble Qilin') is a Chinese illustrator and political cartoonist. His hometown is Harbin. He describes himself as a "Wolf warrior painter". He is famous for his artwork Peace Force (Chinese: 《和平之师》), which depicts an Australian soldier killing an Afghan child, a reference to the findings of the Brereton Report.

== Biography ==
Since his grandparents were soldiers in the Korean War, Wuheqilin became a party loyalist when he was young. After graduating from a university in Changchun with a degree in art and design, Wuheqilin served as an intern in an animation and film production company in Beijing in 2009. Later, a director left the company and created his own studio, with whom Wuheqilin worked in Zhongguancun. At the end of 2013, he was invited to Shanghai Film Art Academy (zh:上海电影艺术学院) to give a lecture on computer graphics, and started a painting training institute called "Wuhe" in early 2014.

Wuheqilin describes himself as a "Wolf Warrior artist".

== Significant works ==
A dispute between China and Australia arose in 2020 when a member of China's foreign ministry posted online a picture of Wuheqilin's image Peace Force, which depicts an Australian soldier preparing to slit an Afghan child's throat. The image is a reference to the Brereton Report, which exposed the murder of more than three dozen Afghan civilians by Australian troops. Australian Prime Minister Scott Morrison demanded an apology, which China declined to give. Wuheqilin then created another image mocking Morrison.

Wuheqilin satirized writer Fang Fang with his image Crown of a Jester, depicting Fang Fang as a court jester for a uniformed white master sitting on a throne while Fang Fang performs for Western journalists in the gallery. It portrayed her as having "handed over the knife" with which her "Western sponsors" could attack China.

After Chinese consumers started threatening to boycott H&M, Nike and other brands that have joined a call to avoid using cotton produced in Xinjiang, Wuheqilin published his new artwork Blood Cotton Initiative to criticize the Better Cotton Initiative.

After the May 2021 Group of Seven (G7) Foreign Ministers meeting, Wuheqilin created an image satirizing a photograph of G7 officials by portraying them in old-style military uniforms. Wuheqilin wrote, "The last time when these guys colluded to [suppress] China was in 1900; 120 years have passed, they are still dreaming." The image went viral on social media.

Wuheqilin's created his artwork Shanghai Must Not Fall during the 2022 Shanghai COVID-19 outbreak. The illustration depicts hazmat-clad figures shutting gates as a swarm of snakes attempt to pour through.

== Reception ==
Wuheqilin's works are generally received positively by the Chinese public and by the state. Following Wuheqilin's image satirizing the G7 Foreign Ministers, Chinese Communist Party-owned tabloid Global Times praised Wuheqilin as a Chinese patriot. A common view among Chinese is that Wuheqilin is a national hero whose works rebut the West's criticisms of China's internal affairs.

Guancha has described Wuheqilin as having "fought tooth and nail against anti-China forces so that more patriotic youth can speak up."

Academic Suisheng Zhao describes Wuheqilin as having made his reputation "with his scathing images of the United States as a blood-soaked, irrational, medieval realm[.]" Wuheqilin's works became increasingly popular domestically after his Peace Force illustration.

== Gallery ==
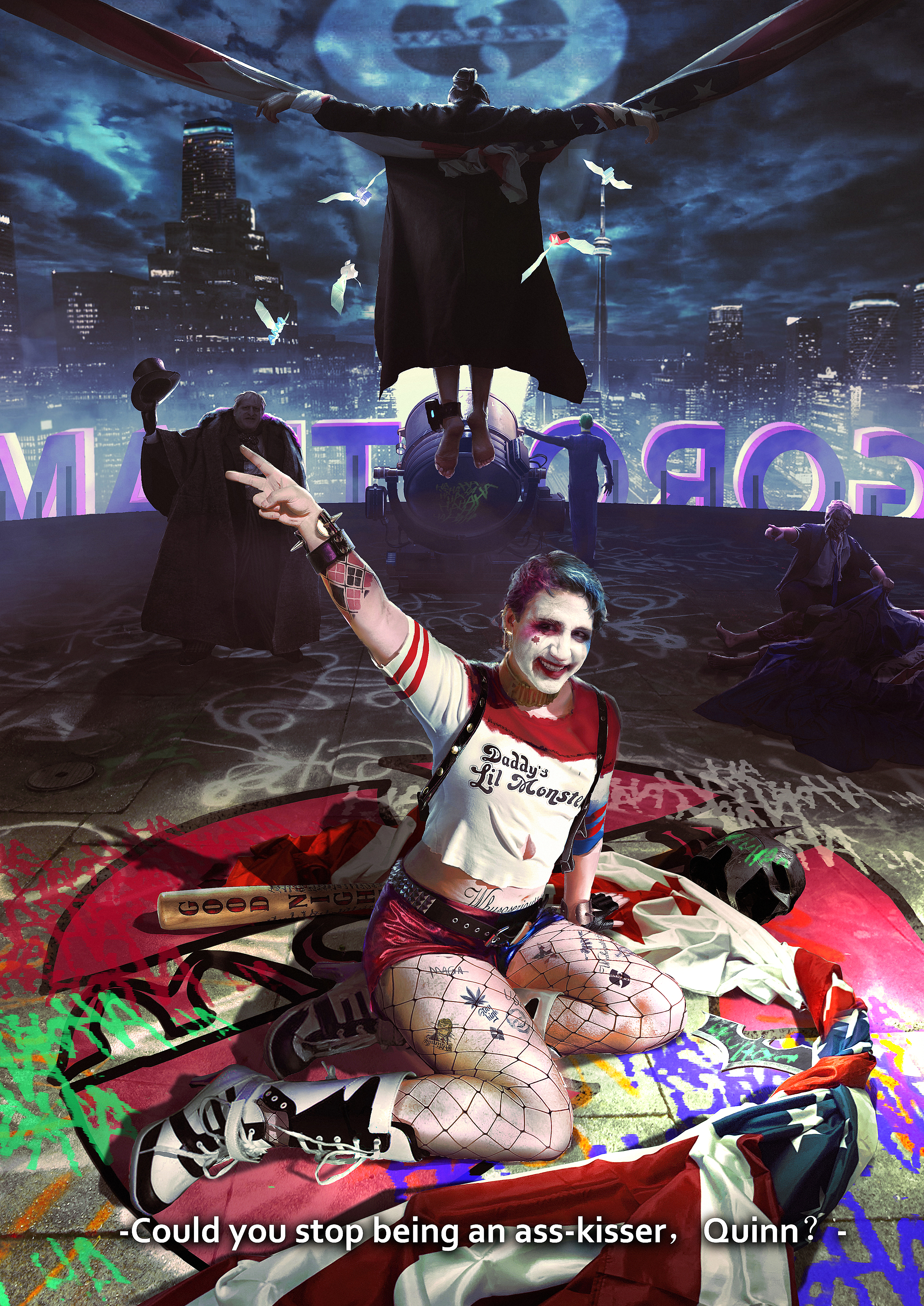
BAT

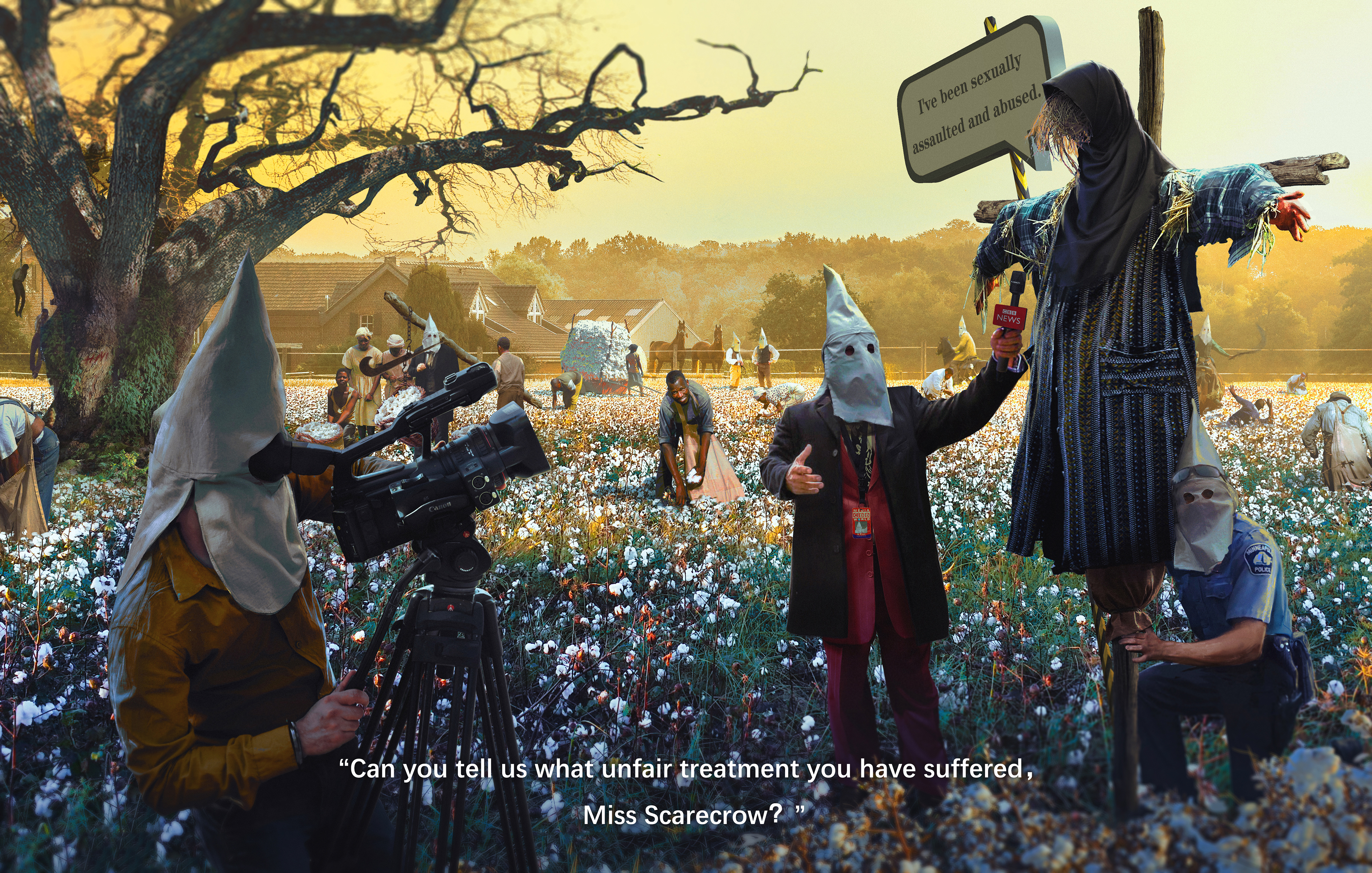
Blood Cotton Initiative

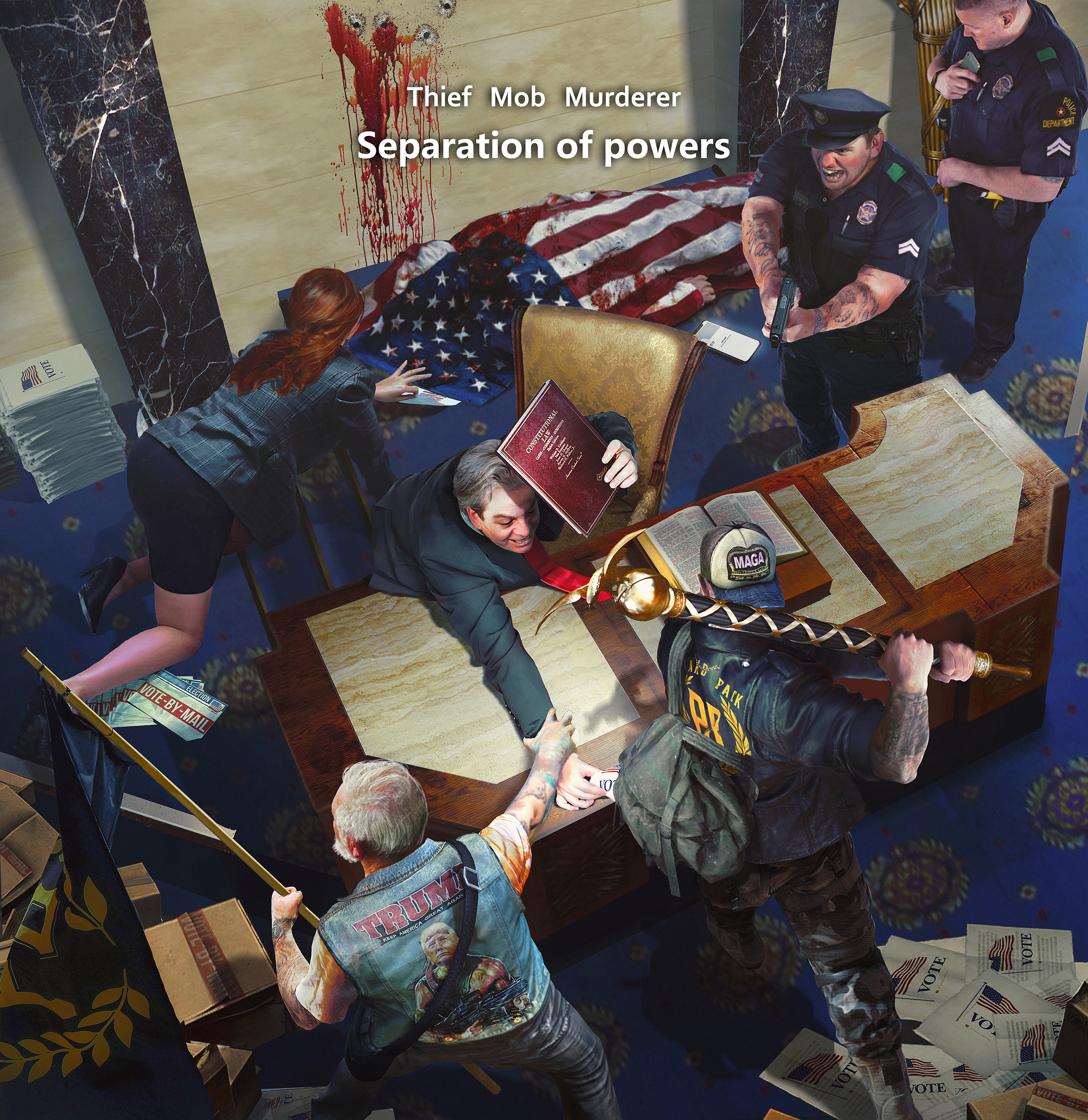
Separation of powers

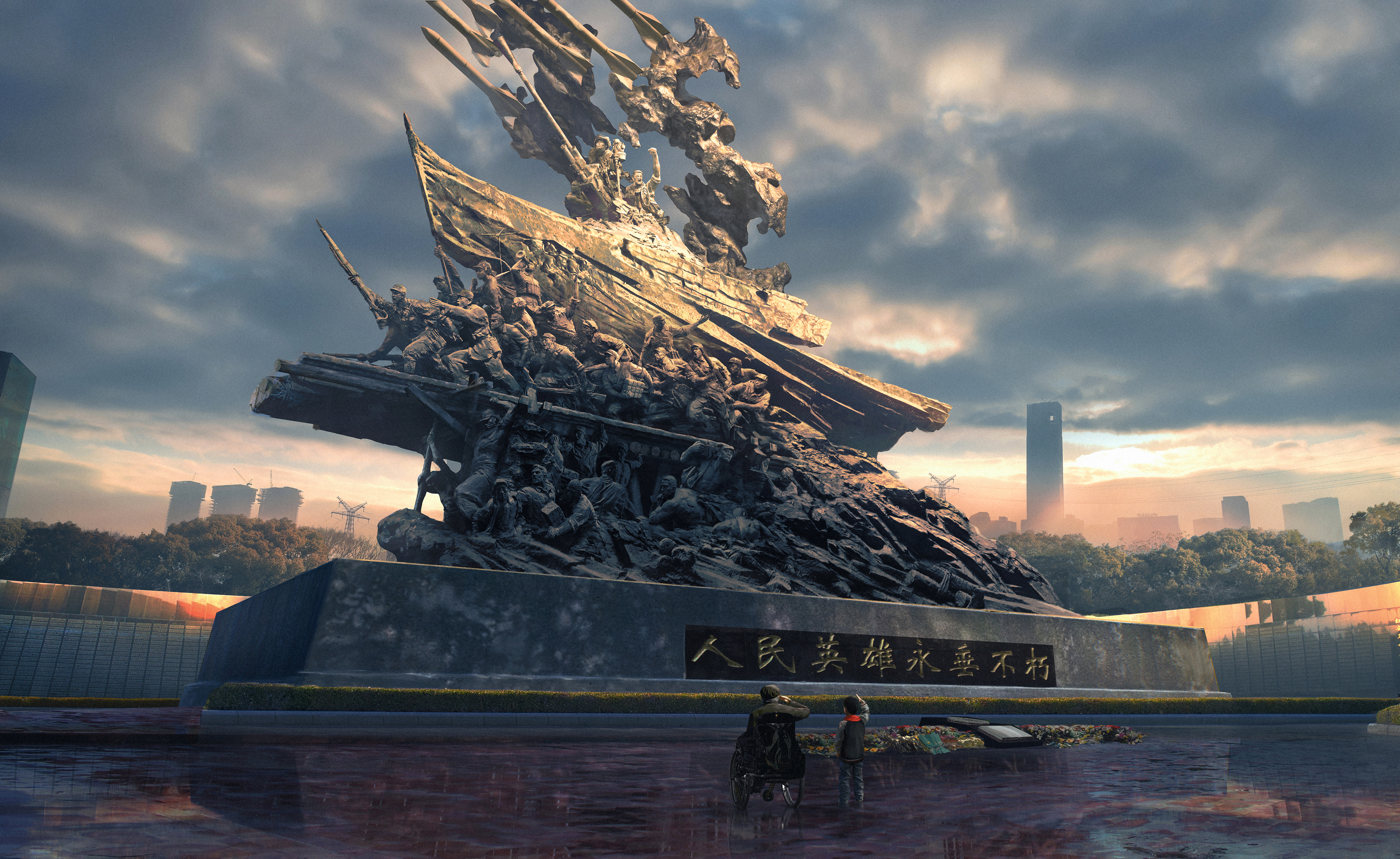
丰碑

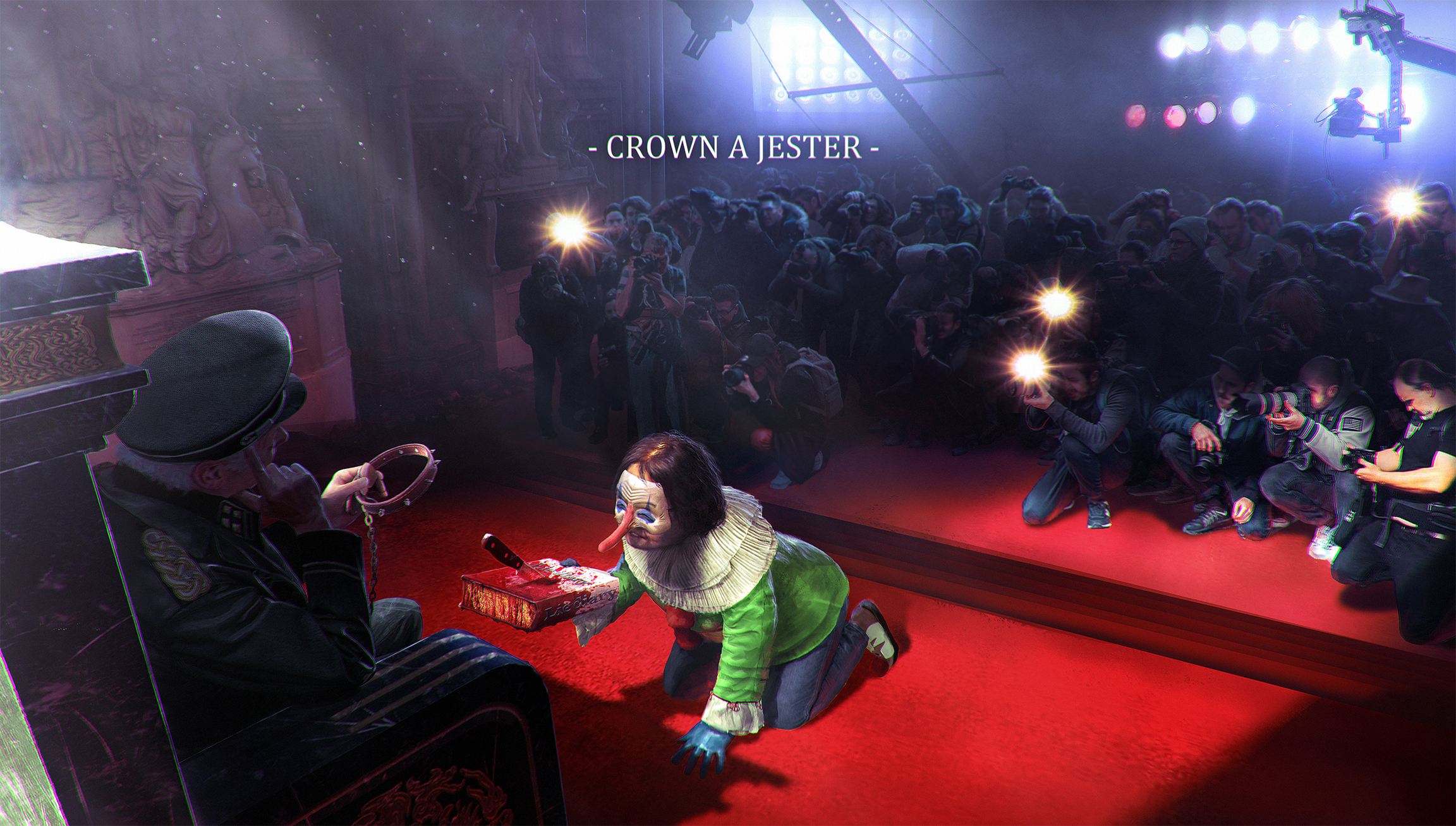
Crown A Jester

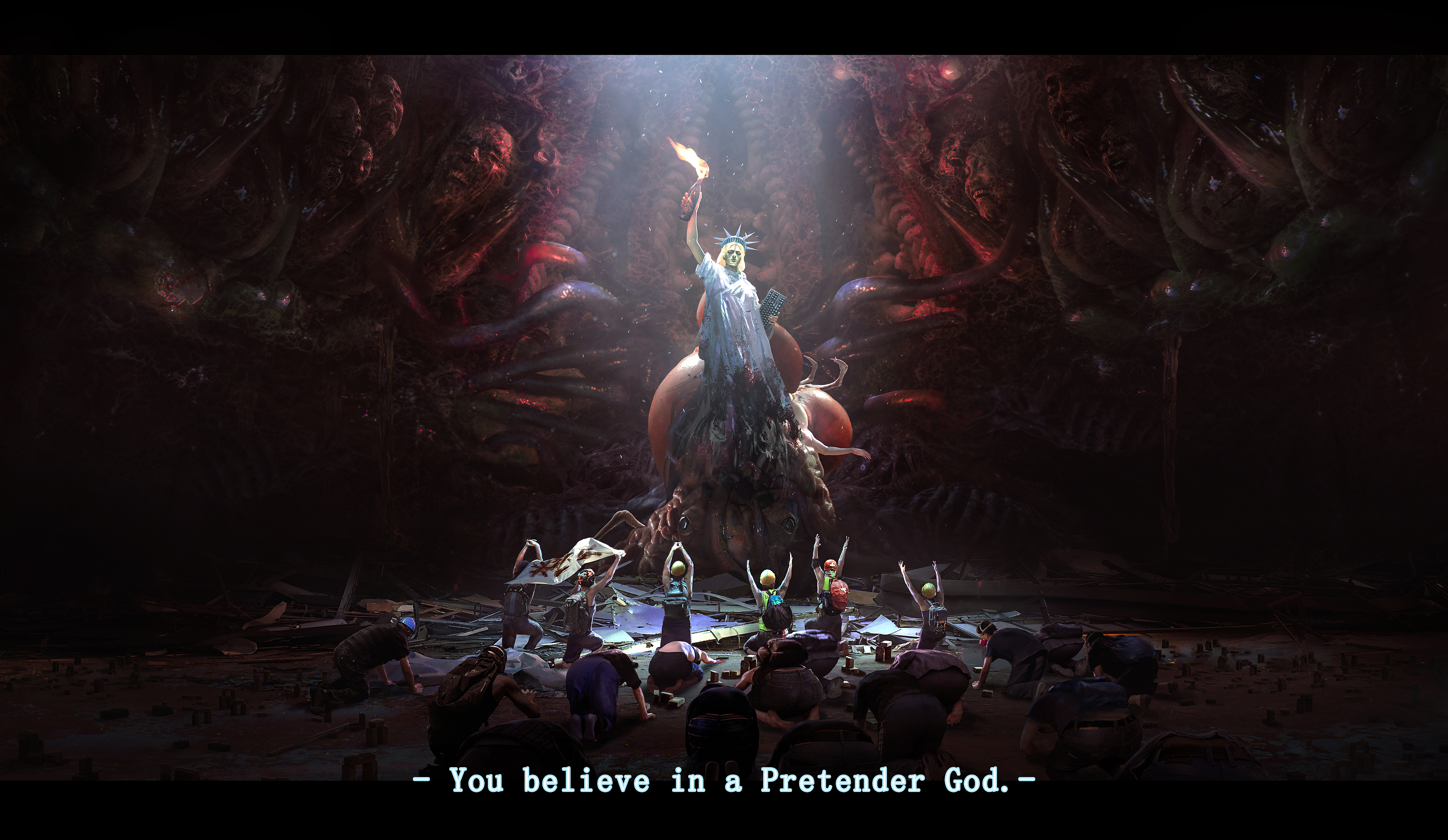
Pretender God

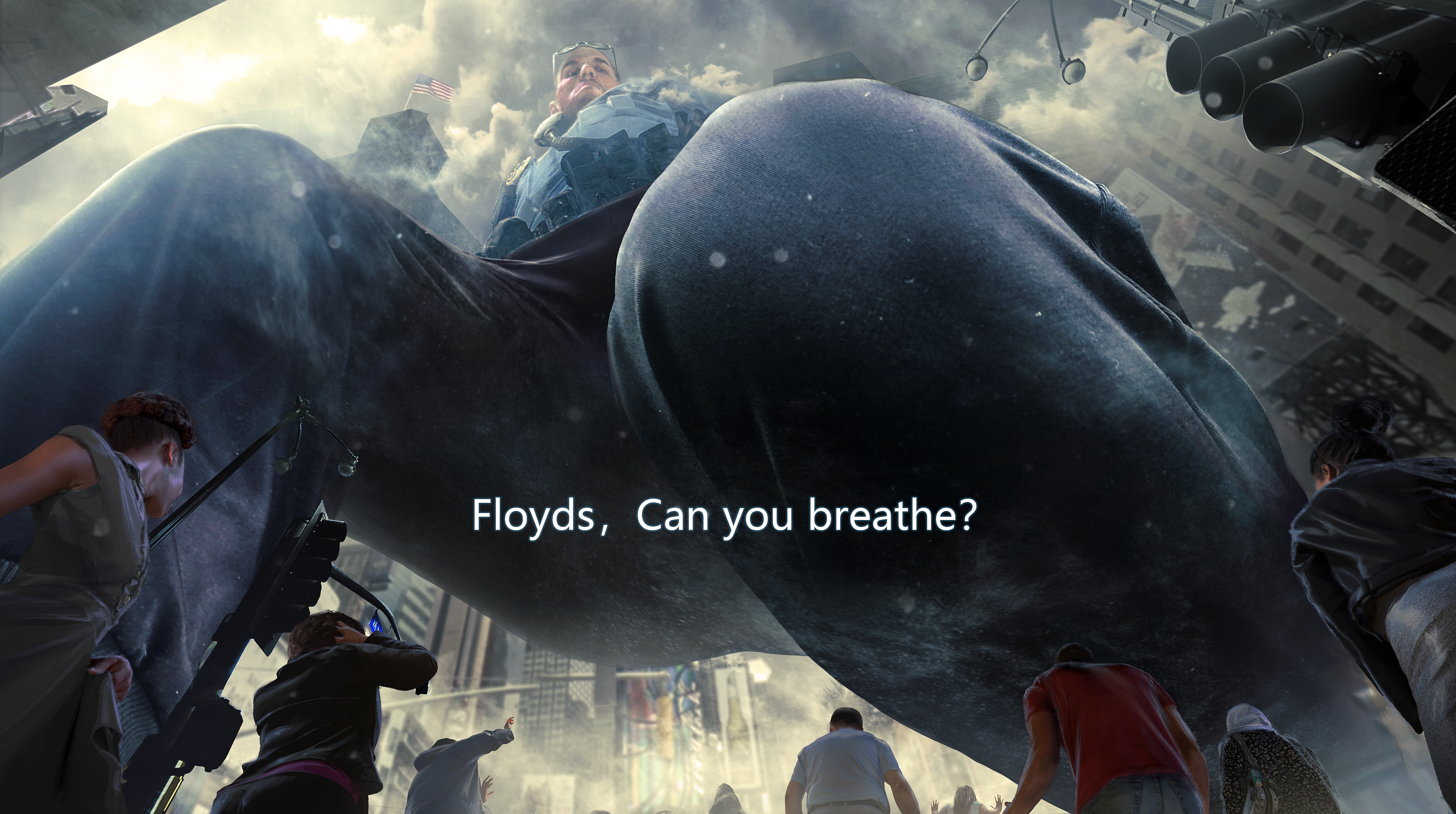
Floyds, can you breathe?

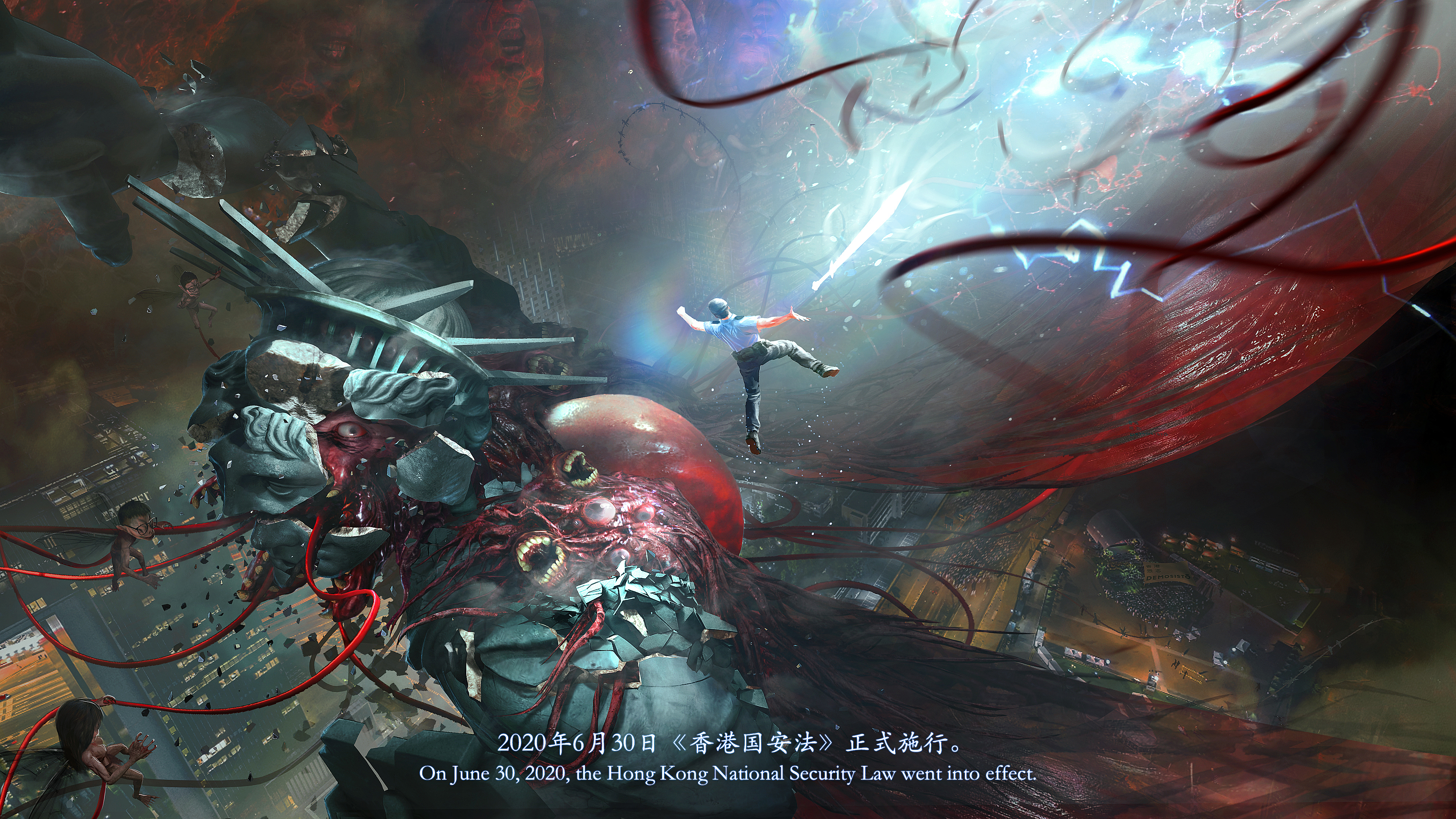
剑来

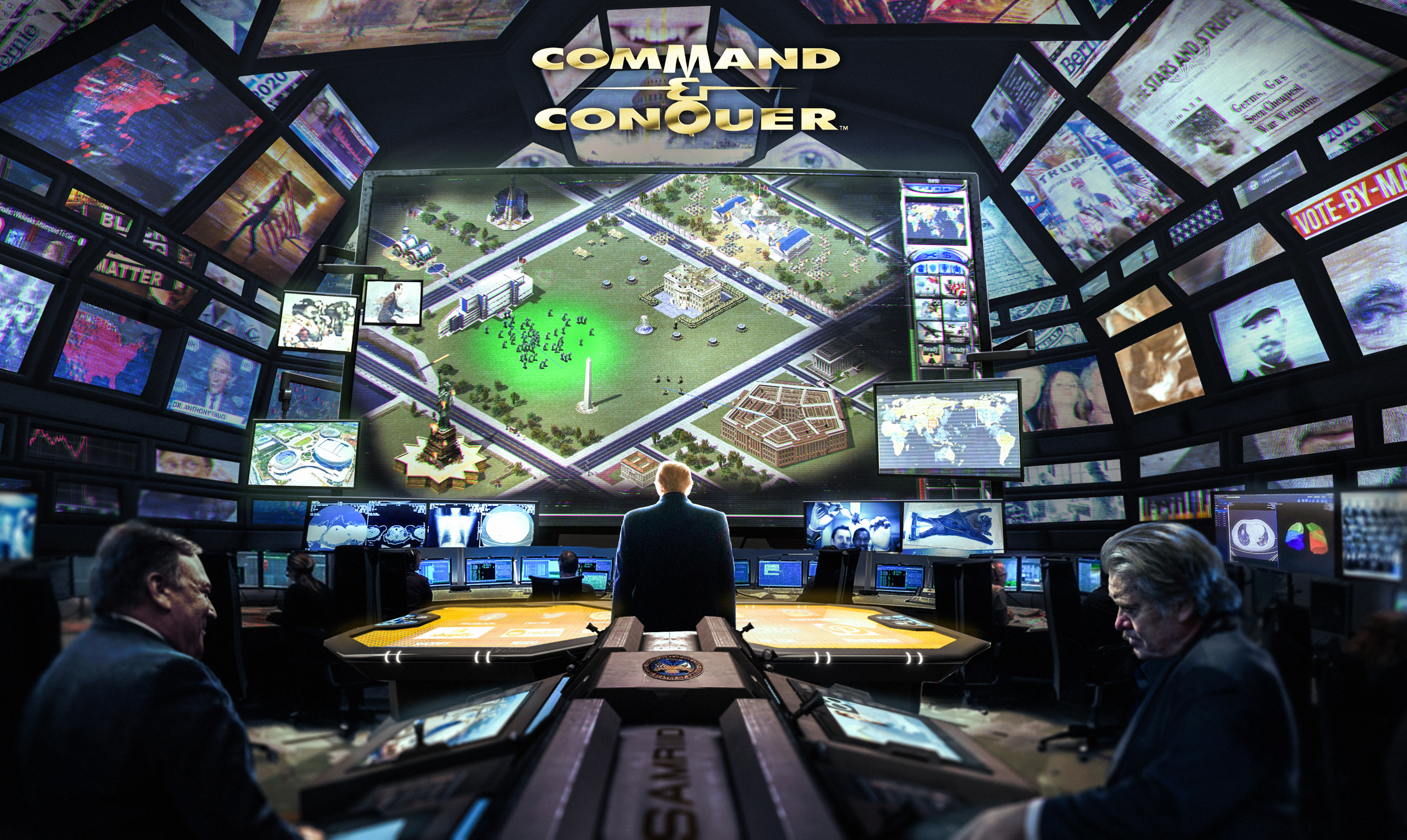
Command & Conquer

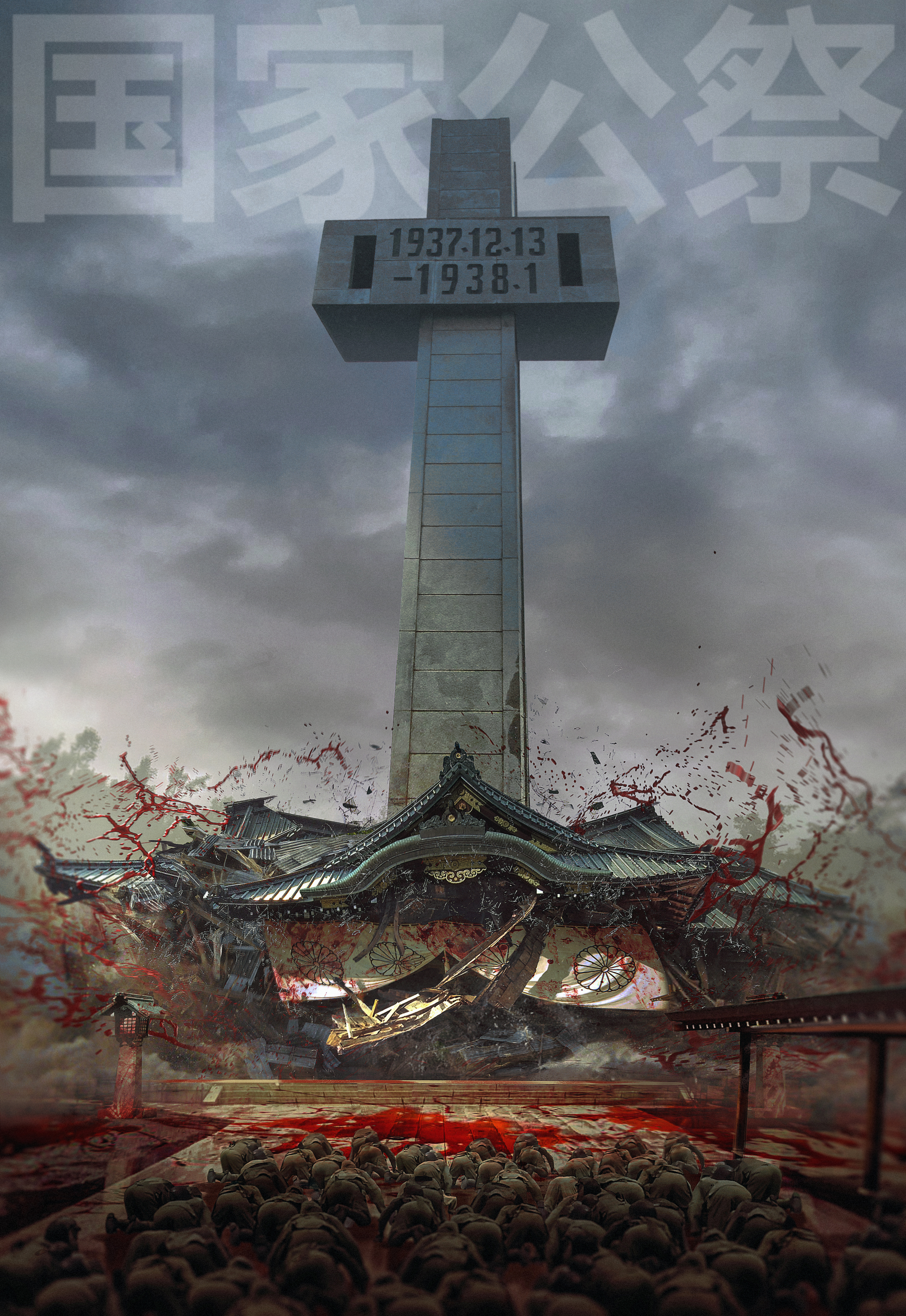
国家公祭

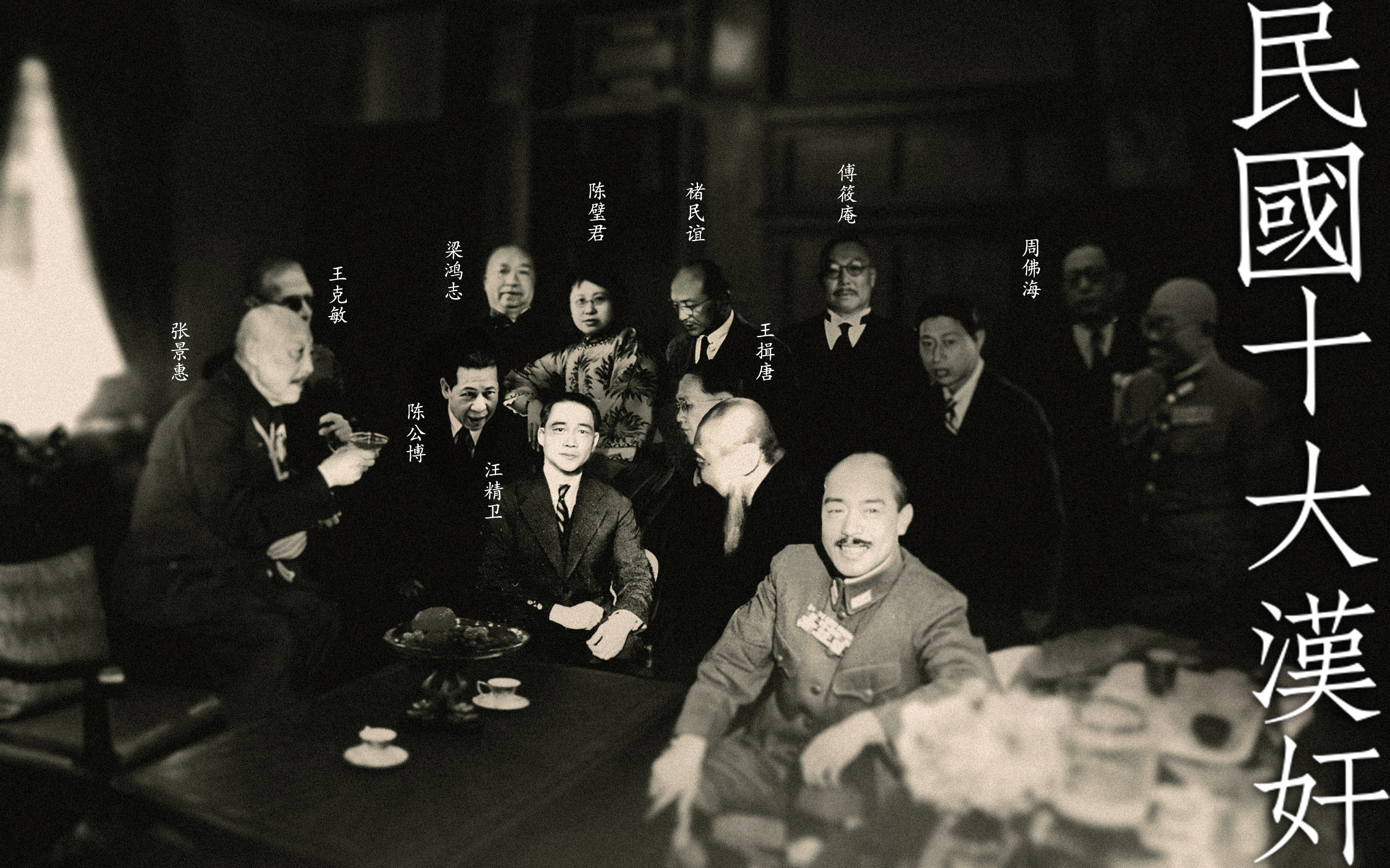
Top 10 traitors

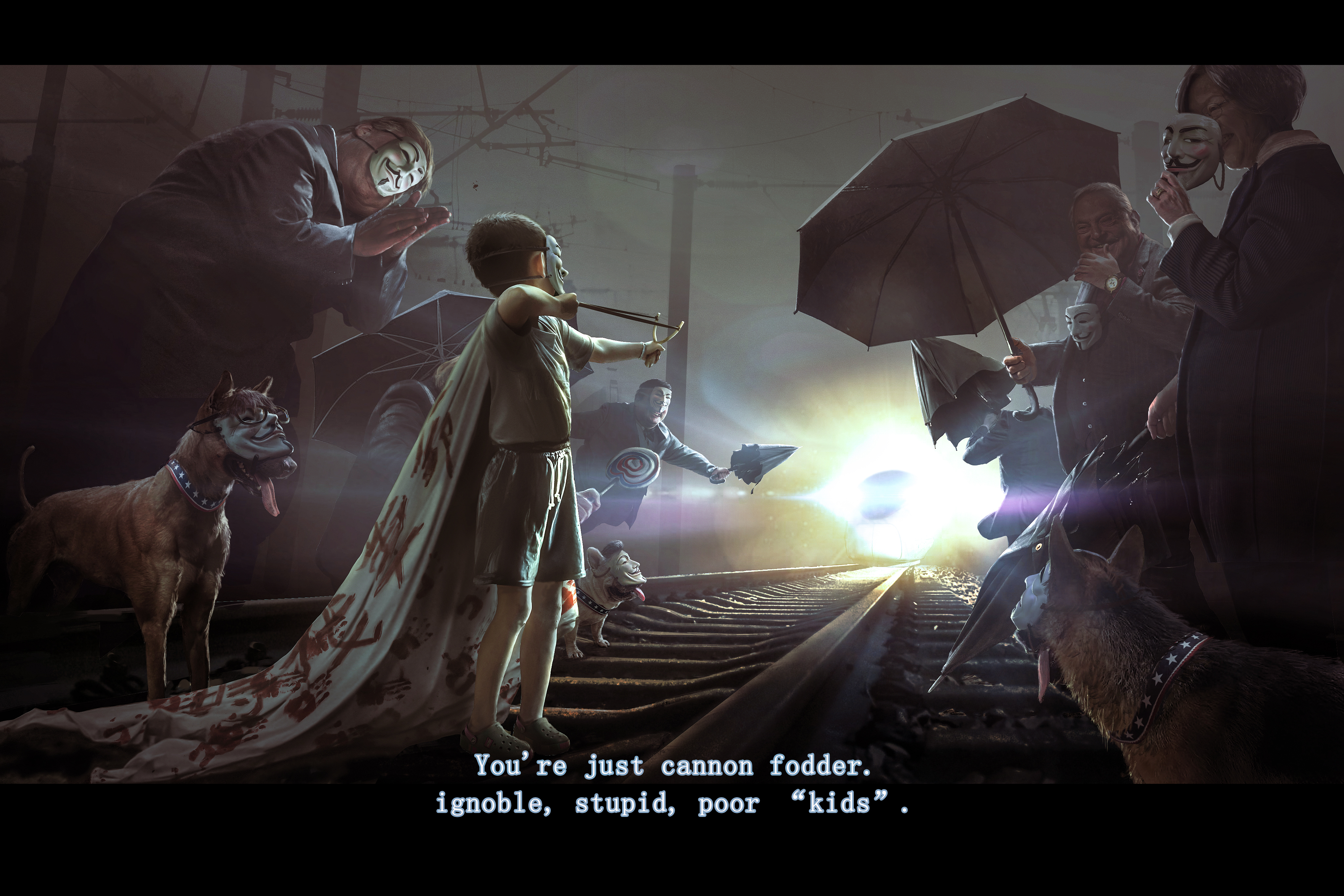
Cannon Fodder

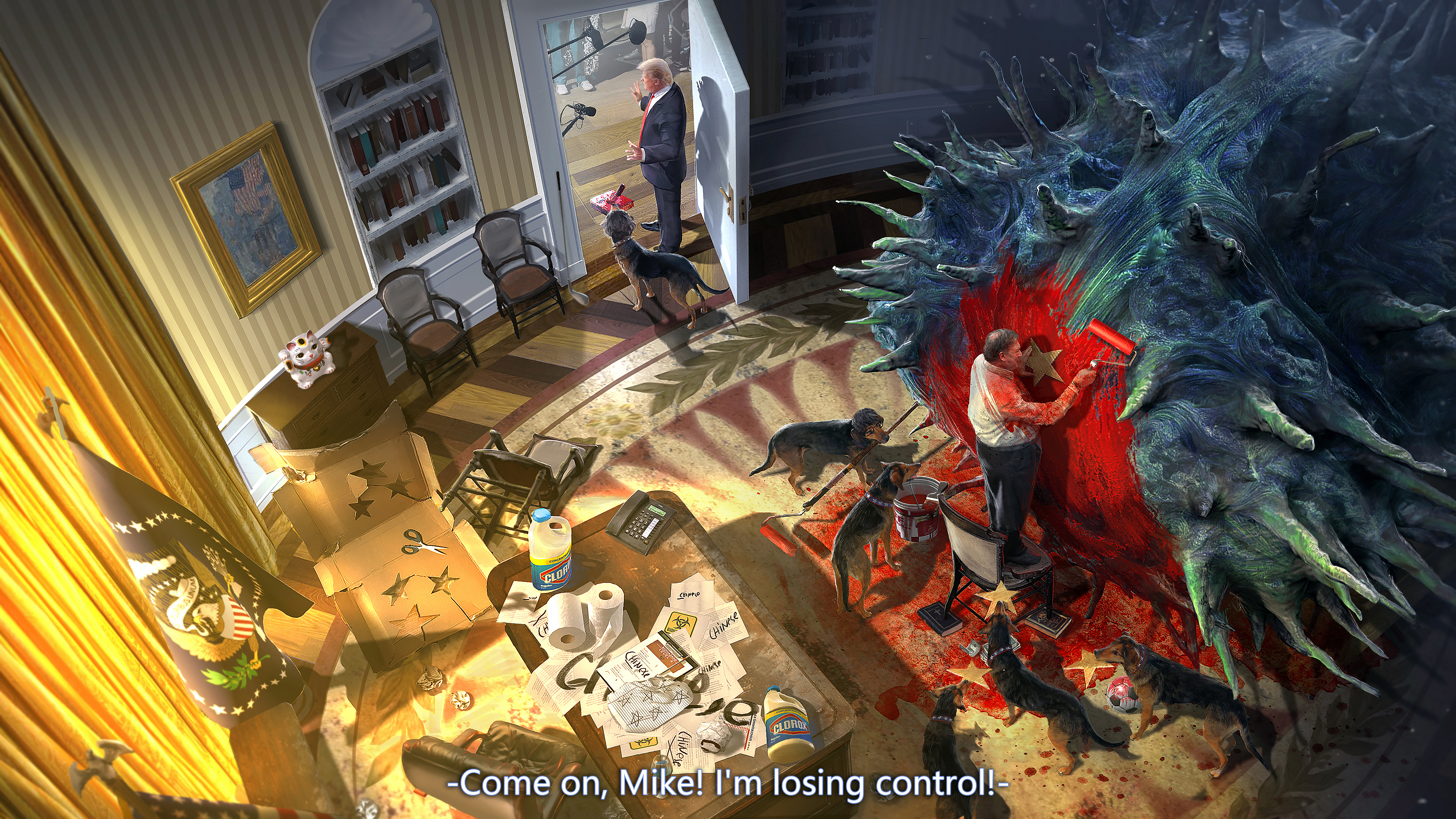
白宫粉刷匠

To Morrison

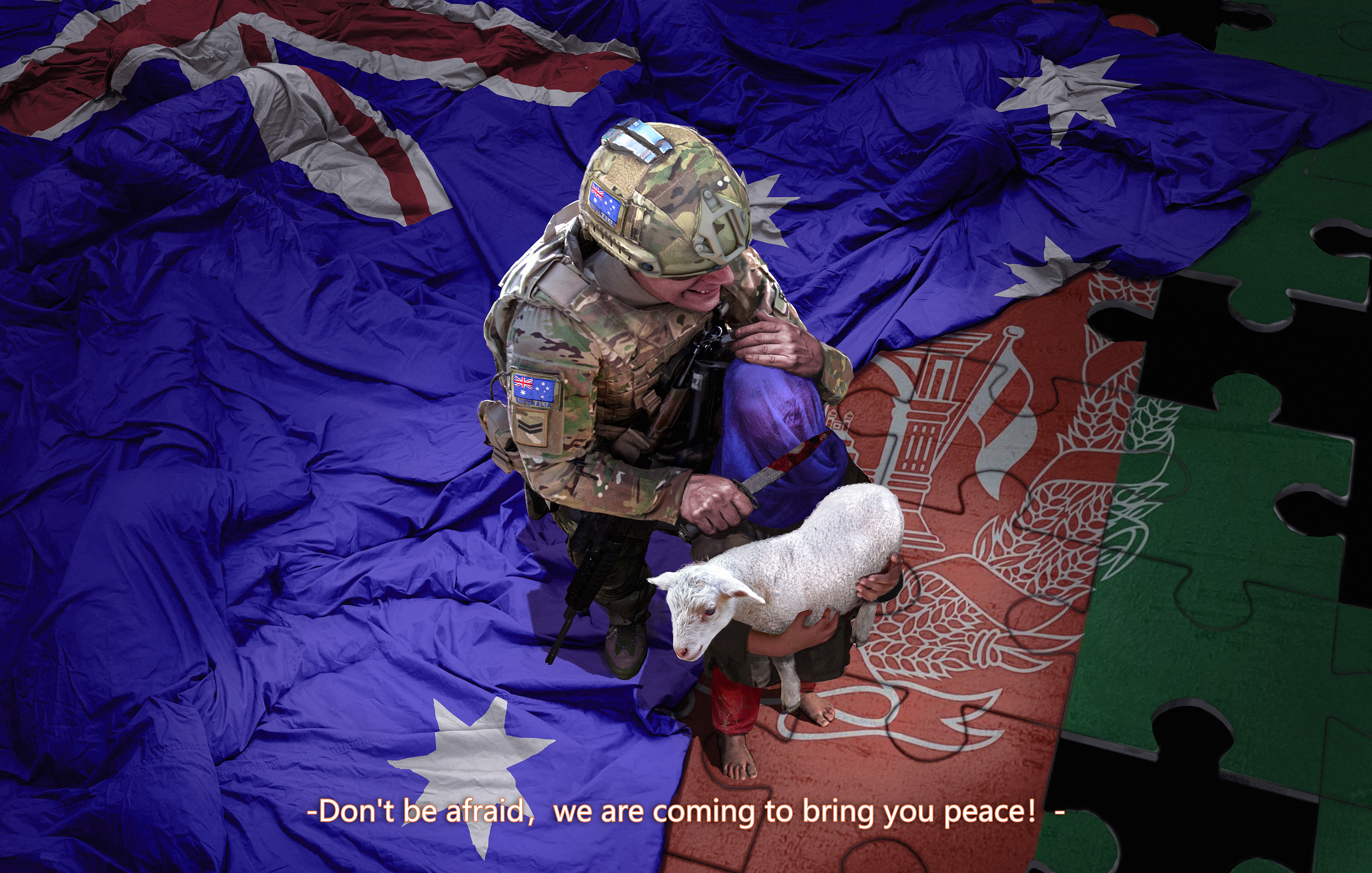
The artistic image Peace Force (和平之师)
