= Foreign policy of Xi Jinping =

Policy of CCP General Secretary (2012–present)

The foreign policy of Xi Jinping concerns the policies of the People's Republic of China's Xi Jinping with respect to other nations. Xi became the General Secretary of the Chinese Communist Party in 2012 and became the President of China in 2013.

Xi has reportedly taken a hard-line on security issues as well as foreign affairs, projecting a more nationalistic and assertive China on the world stage. His political program calls for a China more united and confident of its own value system and political structure. Xi Jinping's "major-country diplomacy" doctrine has replaced the earlier Deng Xiaoping era slogan of "keep a low profile" and has legitimized a more active role for China on the world stage, particularly with regards to reform of the international order, engaging in open ideological competition with the West, and assuming a greater responsibility for global affairs in accordance with China's rising power and status. Xi has advocated for diplomats to adopt a more assertive style, commonly expressed as wolf warrior diplomacy.

In setting foreign policy, Xi favors an approach of baseline thinking, in which China explicitly states red line that other countries must not cross. In the Chinese perspective, taking tough positions on these matters reduces strategic uncertainty.

== Overview ==
Xi takes a strong personal interest in foreign affairs. In his first five years in office, Xi flew over 350,000 miles, visited five continents, and gave over one hundred speeches to foreign audiences. In doing so, he became the first Chinese leader to outpace his American presidential counterparts in foreign travel. Xi's extensive schedule of phone and video foreign meetings as part of his "cloud diplomacy" (云外交) received prominent attention in Chinese media, similar to in-person foreign visits. Xi's foreign policies have sometimes been referred to in Chinese state media as Xiplomacy.

Xi has overseen a shift towards a Chinese foreign policy which, as contrasted with the approaches of Chinese leaders since Deng Xiaoping, is more assertive in acting proactively rather than reacting, and more willing to forcefully assert national interests rather than compromise them. This transition was marked by the October 2013 announcement of "striving for achievement". According to Xi, the "primary theme of China's foreign policy should be the striving for achievements, moving forward along with time changes, and acting more proactively." Xi calls on diplomats to demonstrate a fighting spirit, which has been expressed in the form of wolf warrior diplomacy.

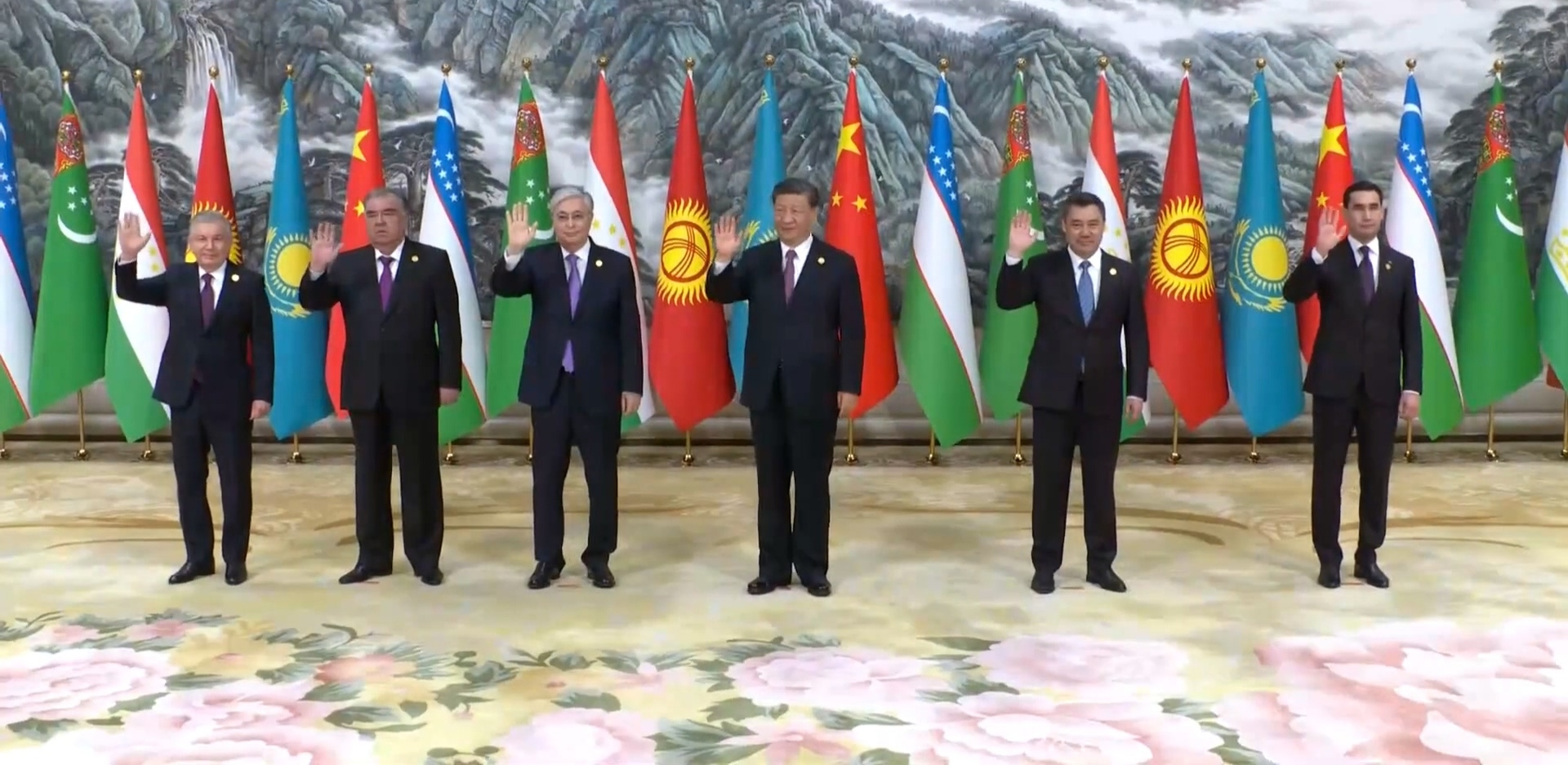
Xi Jinping at the China-Central Asia Summit on 19 May 2023

During the Xi Jinping era, the Community of Common Destiny has become China's most important foreign relations formulation.

Xi advocates "baseline thinking" in China's foreign policy: setting explicit red lines that other countries must not cross. In the Chinese perspective, these tough stances on baseline issues reduce strategic uncertainty, preventing other nations from misjudging China's positions or underestimating China's resolve in asserting what it perceives to be in its national interest.

Before 2017, Xi stated that China should participate in forming a new global order. This position changed in 2017, when Xi articulated the "Two Guidances": (1) China should guide the global community in building a more just and reasonable world order, and (2) that China should guide the global community in safeguarding international security.

During the COVID-19 pandemic, China engaged in mask diplomacy, a practice facilitated by its early success in responding to the pandemic. Chinese ownership of much of the global medical supply chain enhanced its ability to send doctors and medical equipment to suffering countries. China soon followed its mask diplomacy with vaccine diplomacy. China's infection rates were sufficiently low that it could send vaccines abroad without domestic objections. Academic Suisheng Zhao writes that "[j]ust by showing up and helping plug the colossal gaps in the global supply, China gained ground."

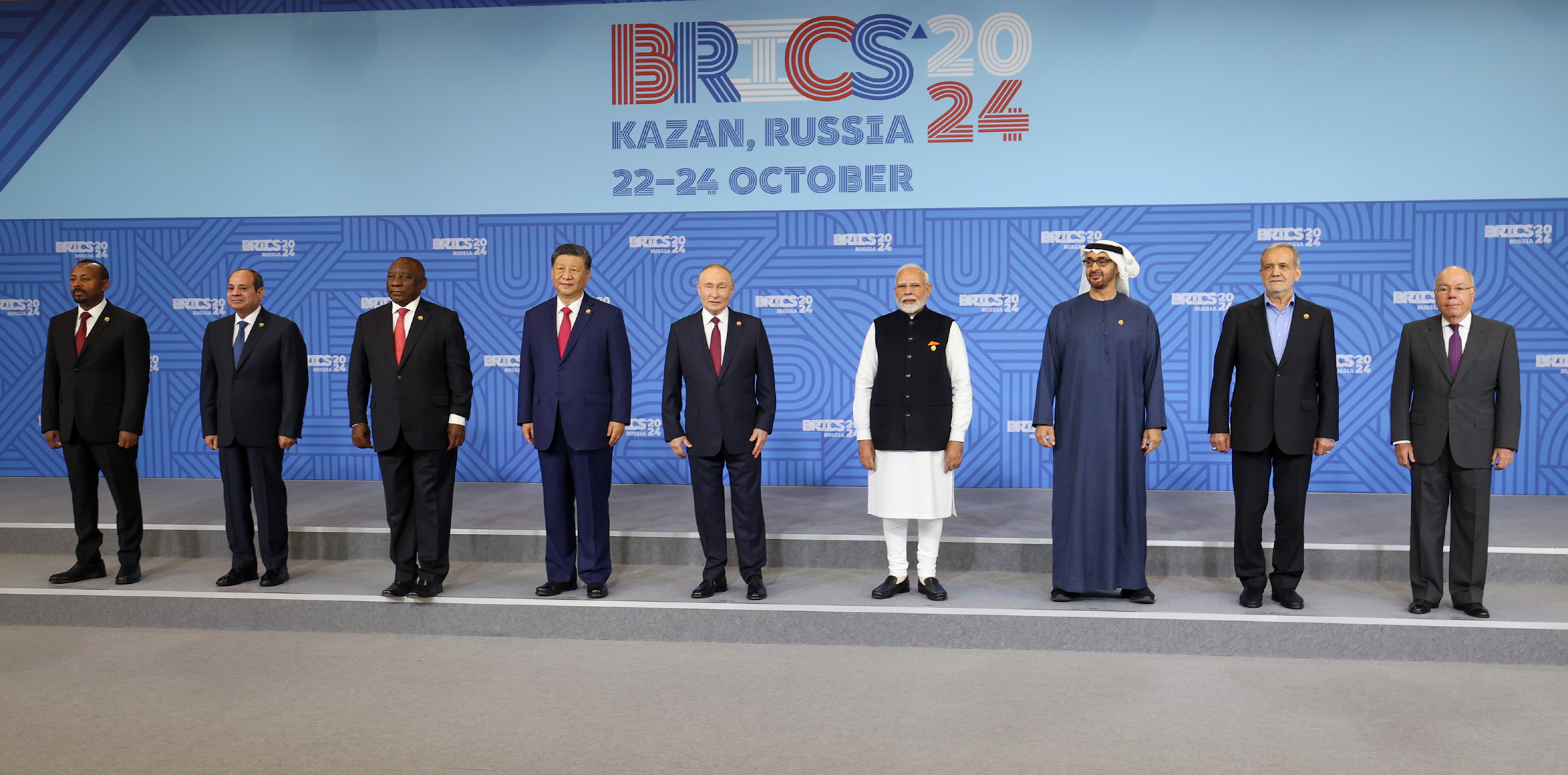
BRICS representatives at the 16th BRICS summit in Kazan, Russia, 23 October 2024

In the Xi era, China takes the position that unilateral economic restrictions and trade discrimination are impermissible measures for countries to use in achieving foreign policy goals and has positioned itself generally as a proponent of global free trade. In his January 2021 speech during the Davos Economic Forum, Xi called for abandonment of deliberate decoupling and the use of sanctions, stating that maintaining a commitment to diplomacy and a multilateral trade regime were important.

During the Xi Jinping administration, China seeks to shape international norms and rules in emerging policy areas where China has an advantage as an early participant. Xi describes such areas as "new frontiers," and they include policy areas such as space, deep sea, polar regions, the Internet, nuclear safety, anticorruption, and climate change.

In foreign policy announcements, Xi sometimes refers to "Great changes unseen in a century". The phrase refers to the perceived decline of United States power both domestically and internationally, as well as the broader fragmentation of Western powers. Xi also cites foreign friends of China in his foreign policy discourse to acknowledge other countries' sacrifices to assist in China's national liberation, particularly with regard to the Second Sino-Japanese war. For example, during diplomatic visits to other countries, Xi has praised the contributions of "friends" such as Claire Lee Chennault, Norman Bethune, Dawarkanath Kotnis, and Soviet pilots.

A statistical analysis of Xi's speeches and statements by academics Asei et al. finds that Xi's foreign policy discourse has shifted over time from an emphasis on great-power diplomacy (at the beginning of his administration) to Belt and Road Initiative diplomacy with developing countries, to global governance diplomacy by the end of his second term.

== Republic of China (Taiwan) ==
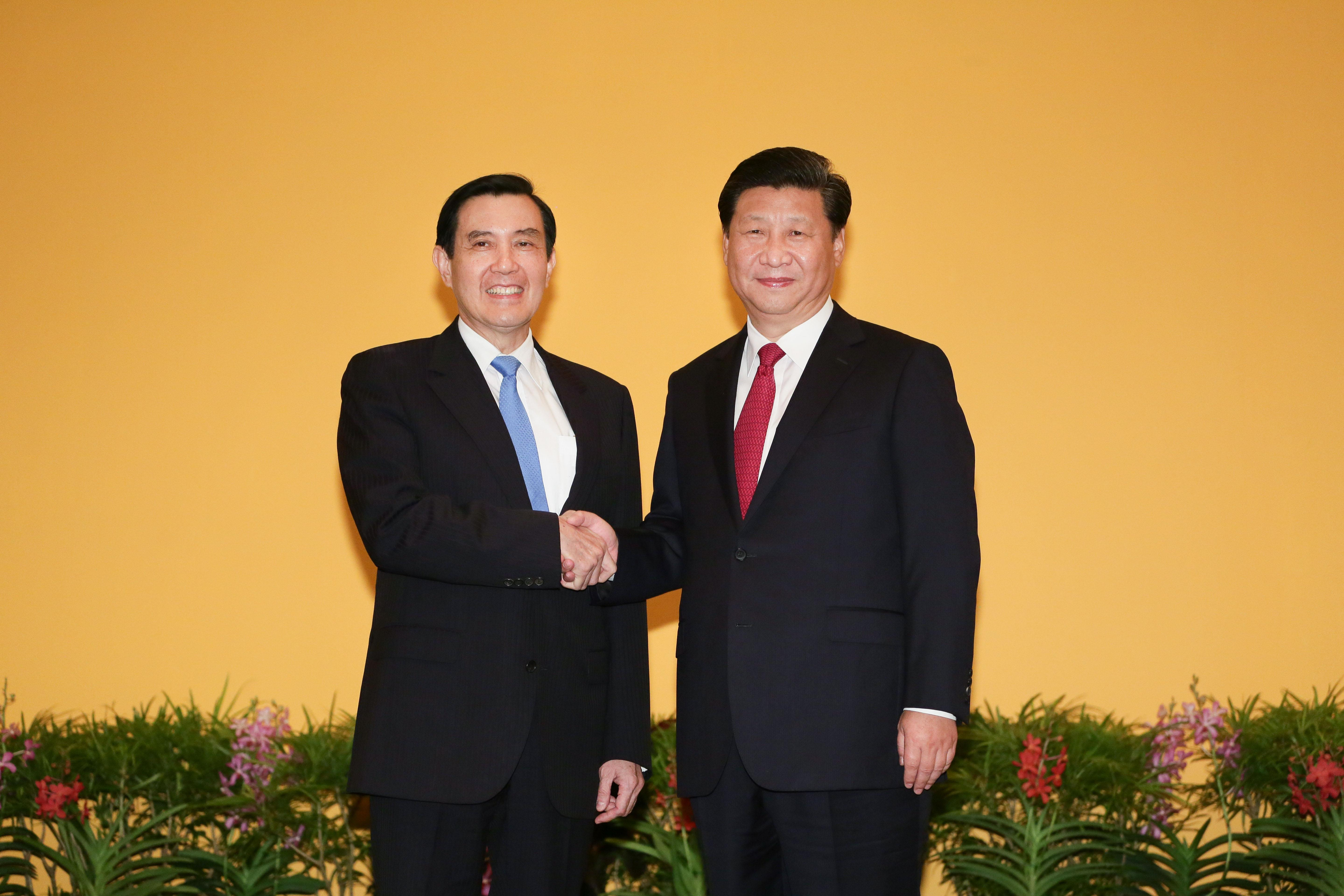
Xi Jinping met with then-Taiwanese president Ma Ying-jeou in November 2015 in their capacity as the leader of mainland China and Taiwan respectively.

In 2015, Xi met with Ma Ying-jeou, the president of the Republic of China (ROC, Taiwan) which marked the first time the political leaders of both sides of the Taiwan Strait met since major hostilities of the Chinese Civil War ceased in 1951. Xi said that China and Taiwan are "one family" that cannot be pulled apart. However, the relations started deteriorating after Tsai Ing-wen of the Democratic Progressive Party (DPP) won the presidential elections in 2016.

On 12 March 2016, Xi stated that the 1992 Consensus was "the greatest common denominator and political bottom line for the peaceful development of cross-strait relations".

In the 19th National Congress of the Chinese Communist Party held in 2017, Xi reaffirmed six of the nine principles that had been affirmed continuously since the CCP's 16th National Congress in 2002, with the notable exception of "Placing hopes on the Taiwan people as a force to help bring about unification." According to the Brookings Institution, Xi used stronger language on potential Taiwan independence than his predecessors towards previous DPP governments in Taiwan. He said that "we will never allow any person, any organisation, or any political party to split any part of the Chinese territory from China at any time at any form." Xi stated that people from Taiwan could receive national treatment in pursuing careers on the mainland and in February 2018 the PRC government announced 31 preferential policies for Taiwan people on matters of industry, finance, taxation, land use, employment, education, and health care.

In March 2018, Xi said that Taiwan would face the "punishment of history" for any attempts at separatism.

In a January 2019 speech commemorating the 40th anniversary of the "Message to Compatriots in Taiwan," Xi Jinping called for "peaceful reunification with Taiwan" in accordance with the "One China principle" and the 1992 Consensus. In Xi's view, the Taiwan issue emerged from China's weakness dating back to the Opium Wars and after World War II, the "two sides of the Taiwan straits fell into a special state of protracted political confrontation due to the civil war in China and the interferences of foreign forces." Xi Jinping called on Taiwan to reject formal independence from China, saying: "We make no promise to renounce the use of force and reserve the option of taking all necessary means." Those options, he said, could be used against "external interference." Xi also said that they "are willing to create broad space for peaceful reunification, but will leave no room for any form of separatist activities." President Tsai responded to the speech by saying Taiwan would not accept a one country, two systems arrangement with the mainland, while stressing the need for all cross-strait negotiations to be on a government-to-government basis.

Xi states that unification with Taiwan should occur peacefully because that is "most in line with the overall interest of the Chinese nation, including Taiwan compatriots." In a speech at the 100th Anniversary of the Chinese Communist Party, Xi stated:

Resolving the Taiwan question and realizing China’s complete reunification is a historic mission and an unshakable commitment of the Communist Party of China. It is also a shared aspiration of all the sons and daughters of the Chinese nation. We will uphold the one-China principle and the 1992 Consensus, and advance peaceful national reunification. All of us, compatriots on both sides of the Taiwan Strait, must come together and move forward in unison. We must take resolute action to utterly defeat any attempt toward “Taiwan independence,” and work together to create a bright future for national rejuvenation. No one should underestimate the resolve, the will, and the ability of the Chinese people to defend their national sovereignty and territorial integrity.

Xi has also said that unification under a "one country, two systems" approach would be appropriate. The American think tank Council on Foreign Relations described Xi's position on Taiwan as continuing consistent with the PRC's 1979 shift from "liberation" of Taiwan to "peaceful unification" with Taiwan.

In 2022, after the PRC military exercises around Taiwan, the PRC published a white paper called "The Taiwan Question and China's Reunification in the New Era," which was the first white paper regards to Taiwan since 2000. The paper urged Taiwan to become a special administrative region of the PRC under the one country two systems formula, and said that "a small number of countries, the U.S. foremost amongst them" are "using Taiwan to contain China." Notably, the new white paper excluded a part that previously said the PRC would not send troops or officials to Taiwan after unification.

== Africa ==
During Xi's administration, China has maintained cordial relationships with each Africa government except Eswatini, which recognizes Taiwan but not the PRC. Xi's diplomatic rhetoric links the China-Africa Community of Shared Future to the concept of the Chinese Dream. Although Xi has generally prioritized relations between the CCP and political parties in the Global South, Xi has especially prioritized such party-to-party relations in Africa.

At the 2018 Forum on China-Africa Cooperation, Xi emphasized the "Five Nos" which guide its foreign policy in dealing with African countries and other developing countries: (1) non-interference in other countries' pursuit of development paths suitable to their national conditions, (2) non-interference in domestic affairs, (3) not imposing China's will on others, (4) not attaching political conditions to foreign aid, and (5) not seeking political self-interest in investment and financing.

Under Xi, China has cut back lending to Africa after fears that African countries couldn't repay their debts to China. Xi has also promised that China would write off debts of some African countries. In November 2021, Xi promised African nations 1 billion doses of China's COVID-19 vaccines, which was in addition to the 200 million already supplied before. This has been said to be part of China's vaccine diplomacy.

== Americas ==
=== Canada ===
In January 2026, Canadian Prime Minister Mark Carney made an official visit to China and met with Xi Jinping. During his official visit to Beijing, Carney announced the formation of a "new strategic partnership" with China.

=== United States ===
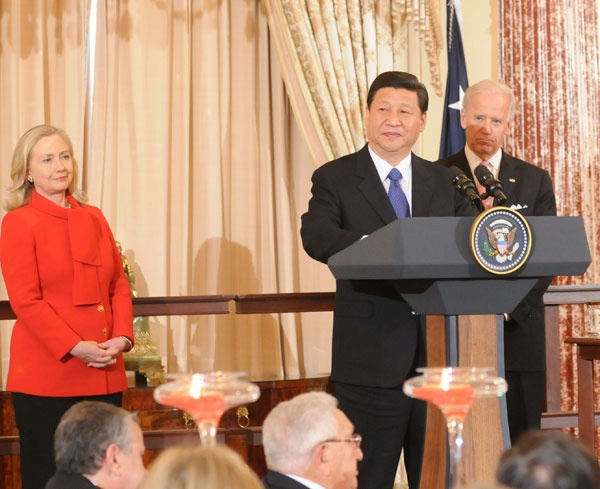
Xi giving a speech at the U.S. Department of State in 2012, with then Secretary of State Hillary Clinton and then Vice-president Joe Biden in the background. Seated in the front row is former Secretary of State Henry Kissinger.

Xi has called China–United States relations in the contemporary world a "new type of great-power relations", a phrase the Obama administration had been reluctant to embrace. According to Xi, the new type of great power relations is based on principles of "no confrontation or conflict", "mutual respect", and "win-win cooperation" Under Xi's administration the Strategic and Economic Dialogue that began under Hu Jintao has continued. On China–U.S. relations, Xi said, "If [China and the United States] are in confrontation, it would surely spell disaster for both countries". Xi has described relations between China and United States in terms of the Thucydides Trap, a term first used by political scientist Graham Allison, meaning that in a clash between two great powers that could otherwise cooperate for the benefit of humanity, all would lose. Early Chinese descriptions of the new type of great power relations focused on the use of the concept in avoiding destructive rivalry.

The U.S. has been critical of Chinese actions in the South China Sea. In 2014, Chinese hackers compromised the computer system of the U.S. Office of Personnel Management, resulting in the theft of approximately 22 million personnel records handled by the office.

Xi has indirectly spoken out critically on the U.S. "strategic pivot" to Asia. Addressing a regional conference in Shanghai on 21 May 2014, he called on Asian countries to unite and forge a way together, rather than get involved with third party powers, seen as a reference to the United States. "Matters in Asia ultimately must be taken care of by Asians. Asia's problems ultimately must be resolved by Asians and Asia's security ultimately must be protected by Asians", he told the conference.

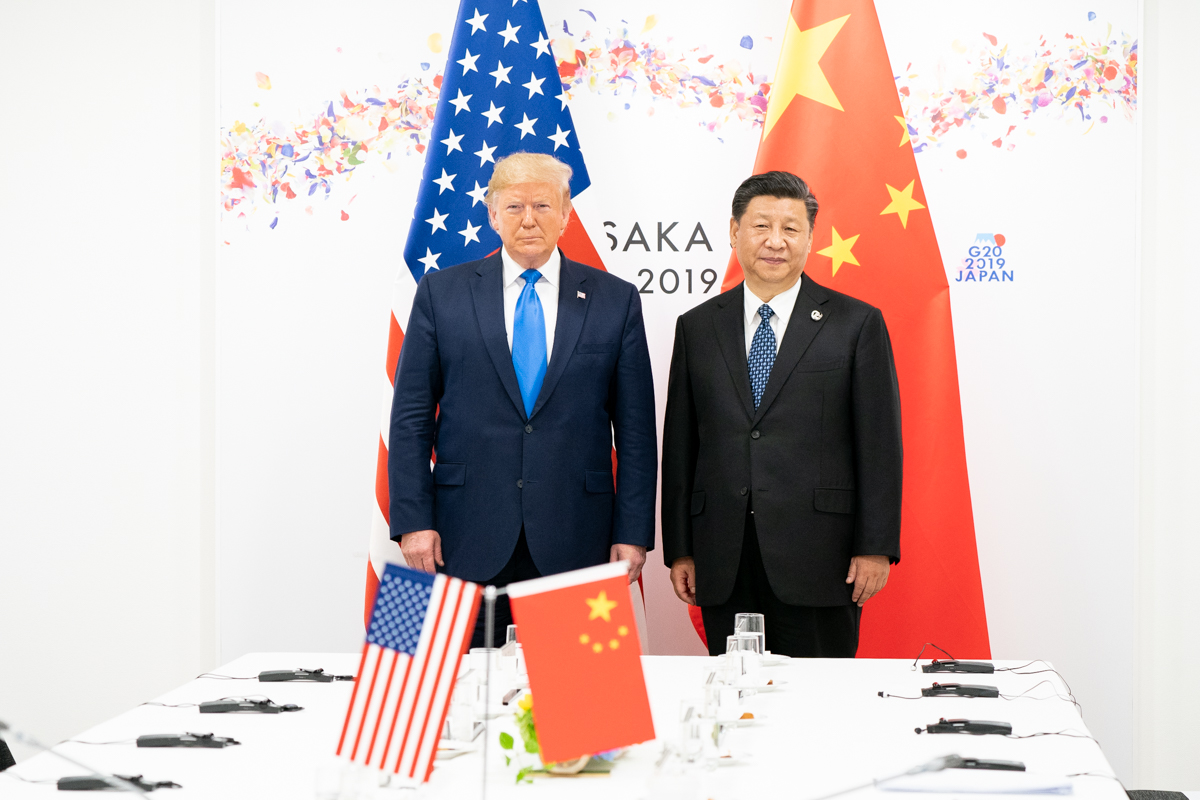
Donald Trump and Xi Jinping at the G20 summit in Osaka, Japan, 29 June 2019

In spite of what seemed to be a tumultuous start to Xi Jinping's leadership vis-à-vis the United States, on 13 May 2017 Xi said at the Belt and Road Forum in Beijing: "We should foster a new type of international relations featuring 'win-win cooperation', and we should forge a partnership of dialogue with no confrontation, and a partnership of friendship rather than alliance. All countries should respect each other's sovereignty, dignity and territorial integrity; respect each other's development path and its social systems, and respect each other's core interests and major concerns... What we hope to create is a big family of harmonious coexistence."

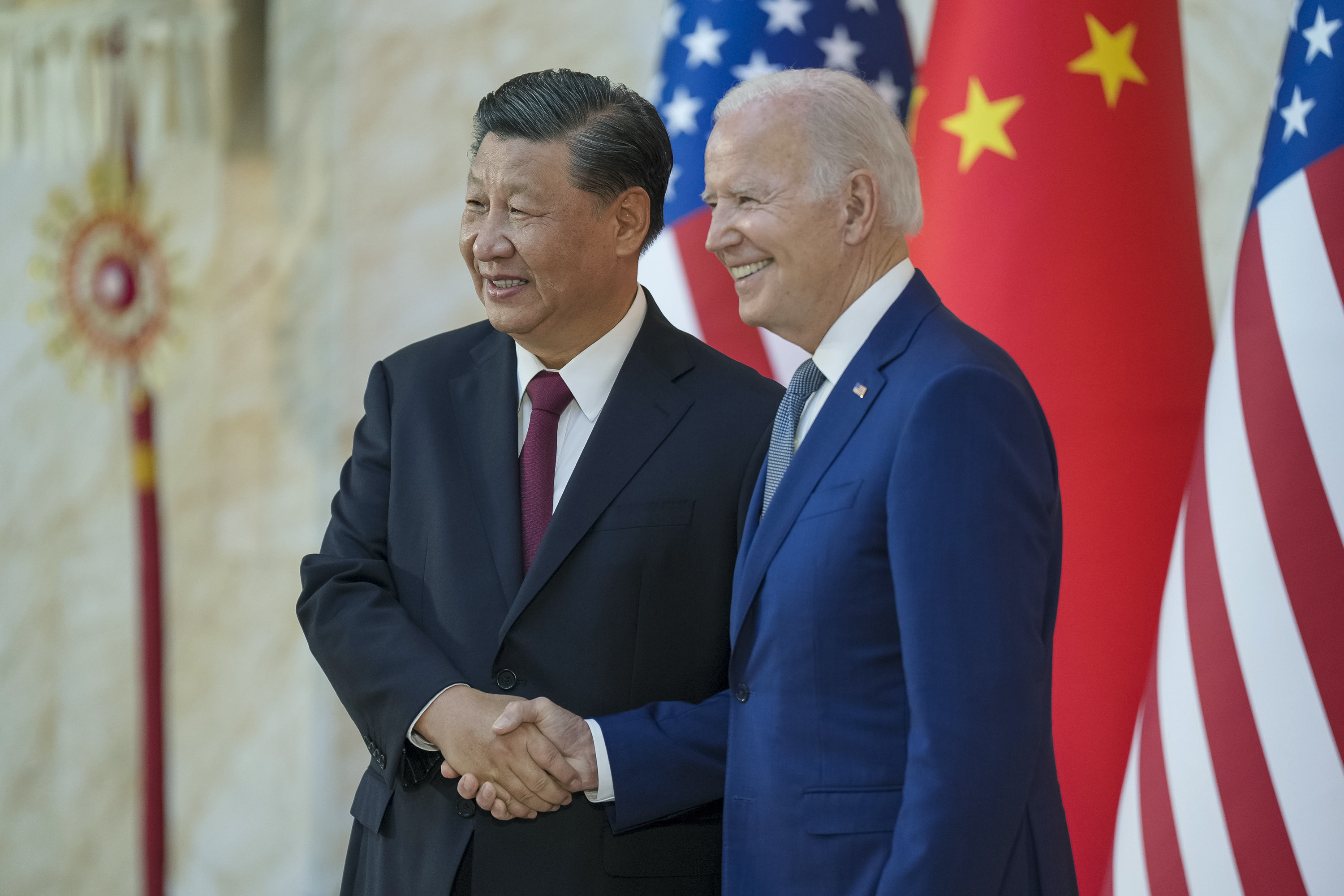
Joe Biden and Xi Jinping at the G20 summit in Bali, Indonesia, 14 November 2022

Relations with the U.S. soured after Donald Trump became president in 2017. Since 2018, U.S. and China have been engaged in an escalating trade war. In 2020, the relations further deteriorated due to the COVID-19 pandemic. In 2021, Xi has called the U.S. the biggest threat to China's development, saying that "the biggest source of chaos in the present-day world is the United States." Xi has also scrapped a previous policy in which China did not challenge the U.S. in most instances, while Chinese officials said that they now see China as an "equal" to the U.S. On 6 March 2023, during a speech to the Chinese People's Political Consultative Conference (CPPCC), Xi said that "Western countries—led by the U.S.—have implemented all-round containment, encirclement and suppression" against China, which he said brought "unprecedentedly severe challenges to our country's development."

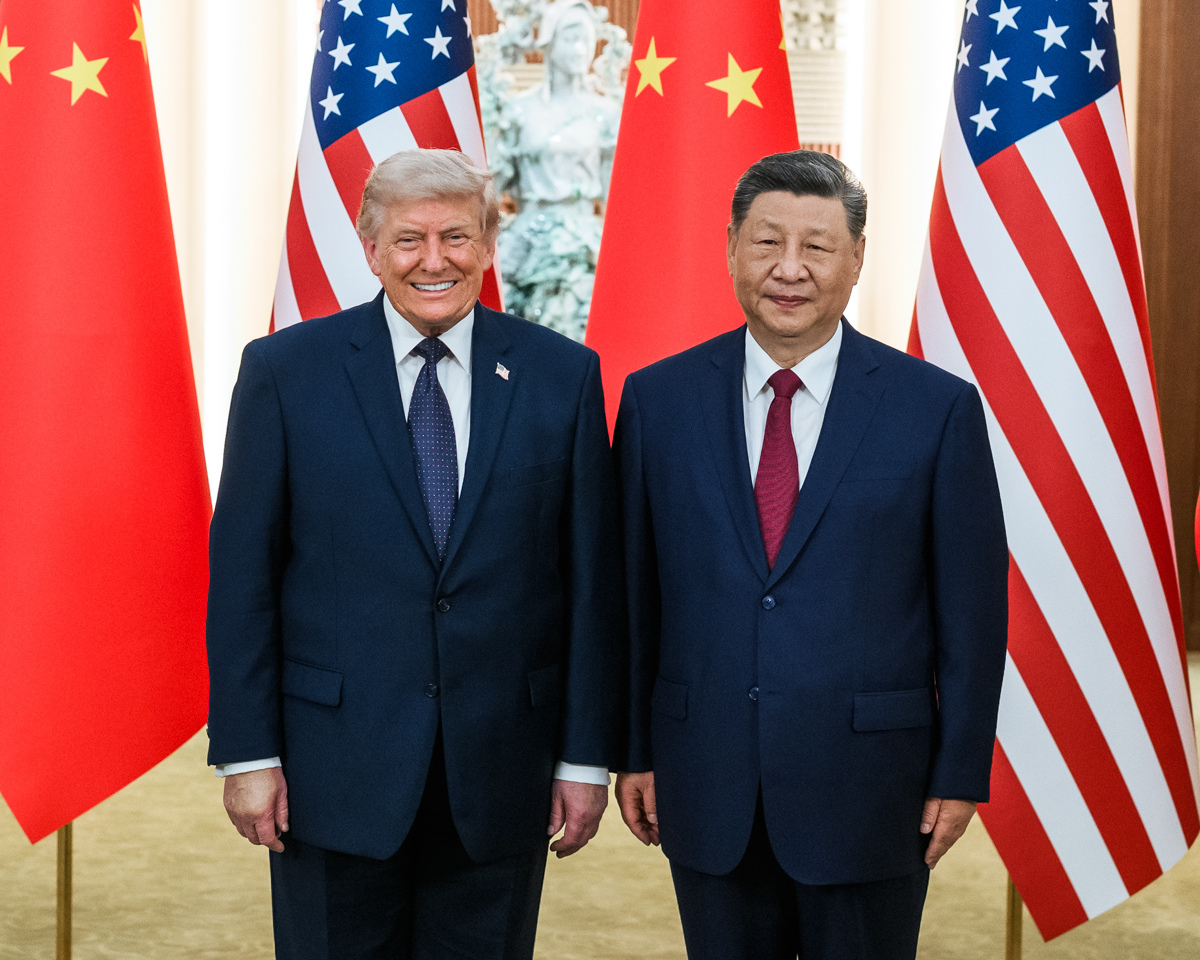
Donald Trump and Xi Jinping at the Great Hall of the People during Trump's state visit to China in May 2026

Donald Trump and Xi Jinping at the White house during Xi's state visit to United States in September 2026

== Asia ==
=== India ===
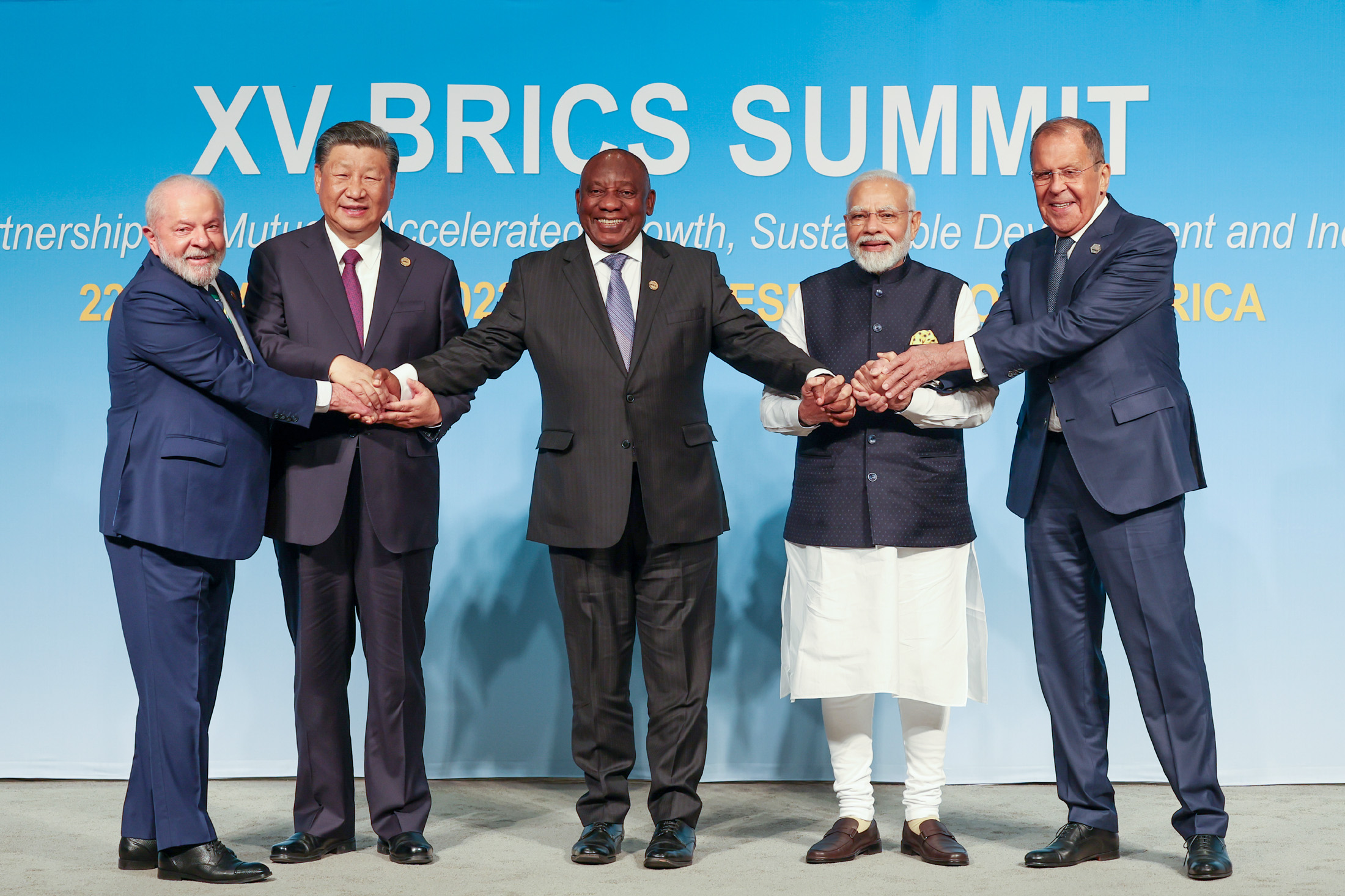
The BRICS leaders in 2023, from left to right: Luiz Inácio Lula da Silva, Xi Jinping, Cyril Ramaphosa, Narendra Modi and Sergey Lavrov (representing Vladimir Putin).

Relations between China and India had ups and downs under Xi, later deteriorating due to various factors. In 2013, the two countries had a standoff in Depsang for three weeks, which ended with no border change. In 2017, the two countries again had a standoff over a Chinese construction of a road in Doklam, a territory both claimed by Bhutan, India's ally, and China, though by 28 August, both countries mutually disengaged. The most serious crisis in the relationship came when the two countries had a deadly clash in 2020 at the Line of Actual Control, leaving some soldiers dead. The clashes created a serious deterioration in relations, with China seizing 2,000 km^{2} territory that India controlled. The relationship later improved starting from 2024.

=== Iran ===
During a visit to Iran in 2016, Xi proposed a large cooperation program with Iran, a deal that was later signed in 2021. On 4 June 2019, Xi told the Russian news agency TASS that he was "worried" about the current tensions between the U.S. and Iran. He later told his Iranian counterpart Hassan Rouhani during an SCO meeting that China would promote ties with Iran regardless of developments from the Gulf of Oman incident.

During a special session of the UN Human Rights Council on 23 January 2026, a resolution was adopted by a vote of 25 in favor and 7 against, condemning the violent suppression of anti-government protests in Iran that have been ongoing since December 2025. China joined six other countries in voting against the resolution.

=== Japan ===
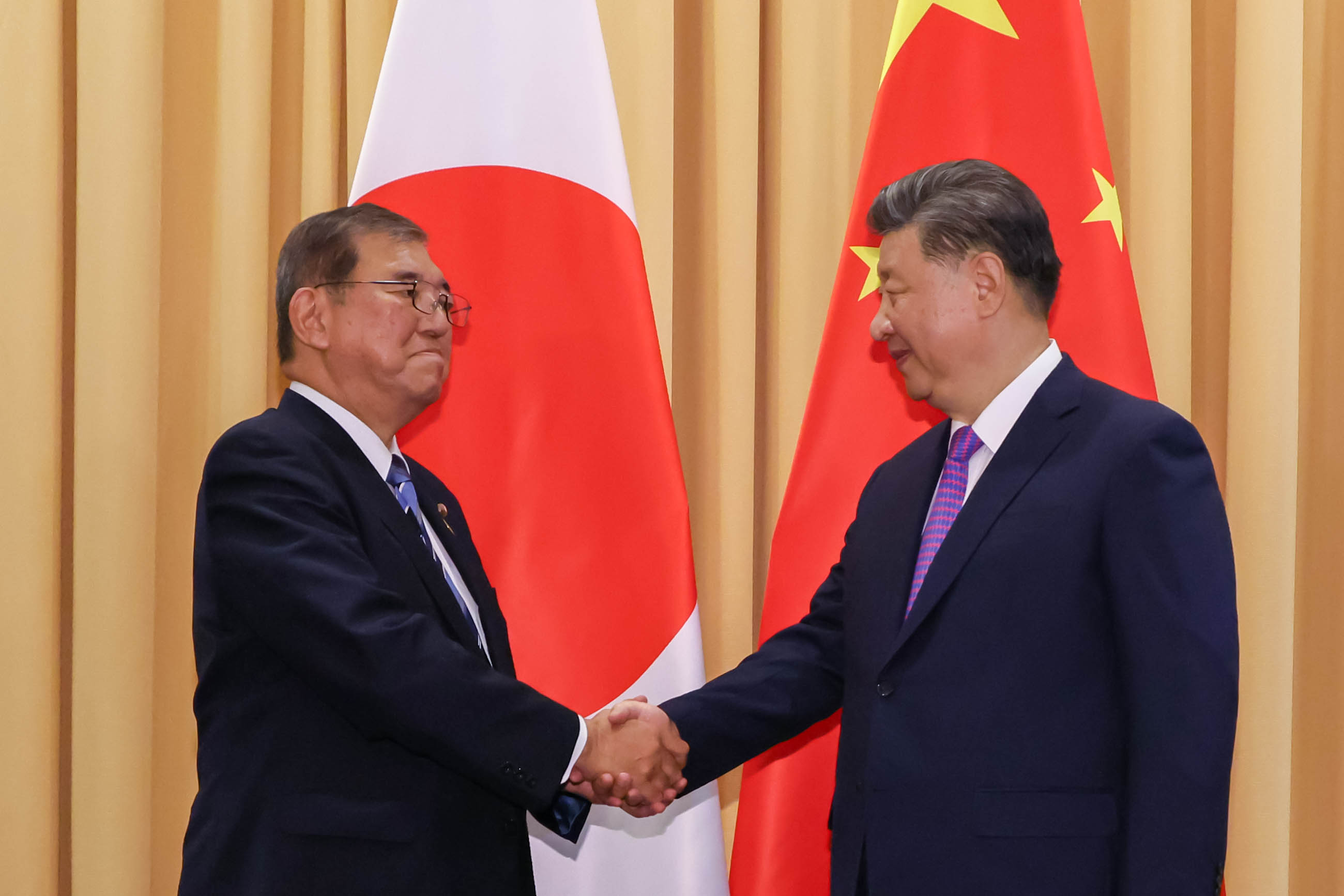
Xi Jinping with Japanese Prime Minister Shigeru Ishiba during the APEC Peru 2024, 15 November 2024

China–Japan relations have initially soured under Xi's administration; the most thorny issue between the two countries remains the dispute over the Senkaku islands, which China calls Diaoyu. In response to Japan's continued robust stance on the issue, China declared an Air Defense Identification Zone in November 2013. However, the relations later started to improve, with Xi being invited to visit in 2020, though the trip was later delayed due to the COVID-19 pandemic. In August 2022, Kyodo News reported that Xi personally decided to let ballistic missiles land within Japan's exclusive economic zone (EEZ) during the military exercises held around Taiwan, to send a warning to Japan.

Chinese leader Xi Jinping made an unusual move by not sending a congratulatory telegram on the day Prime Minister Sanae Takaichi assumed the post of prime minister, but a Japan-China summit meeting between Xi and Takaichi was realized on 31 October during the APEC South Korea 2025. There, the two sides agreed to promote a "mutually beneficial relationship based on common strategic interests." During deliberations in the House of Representatives' budget committee on 7 November, Takaichi said that a Chinese attack on Taiwan could constitute "a situation threatening Japan's survival", allowing Japan to take military action in self-defence. The comments triggered a diplomatic crisis between China and Japan.

=== Middle East ===
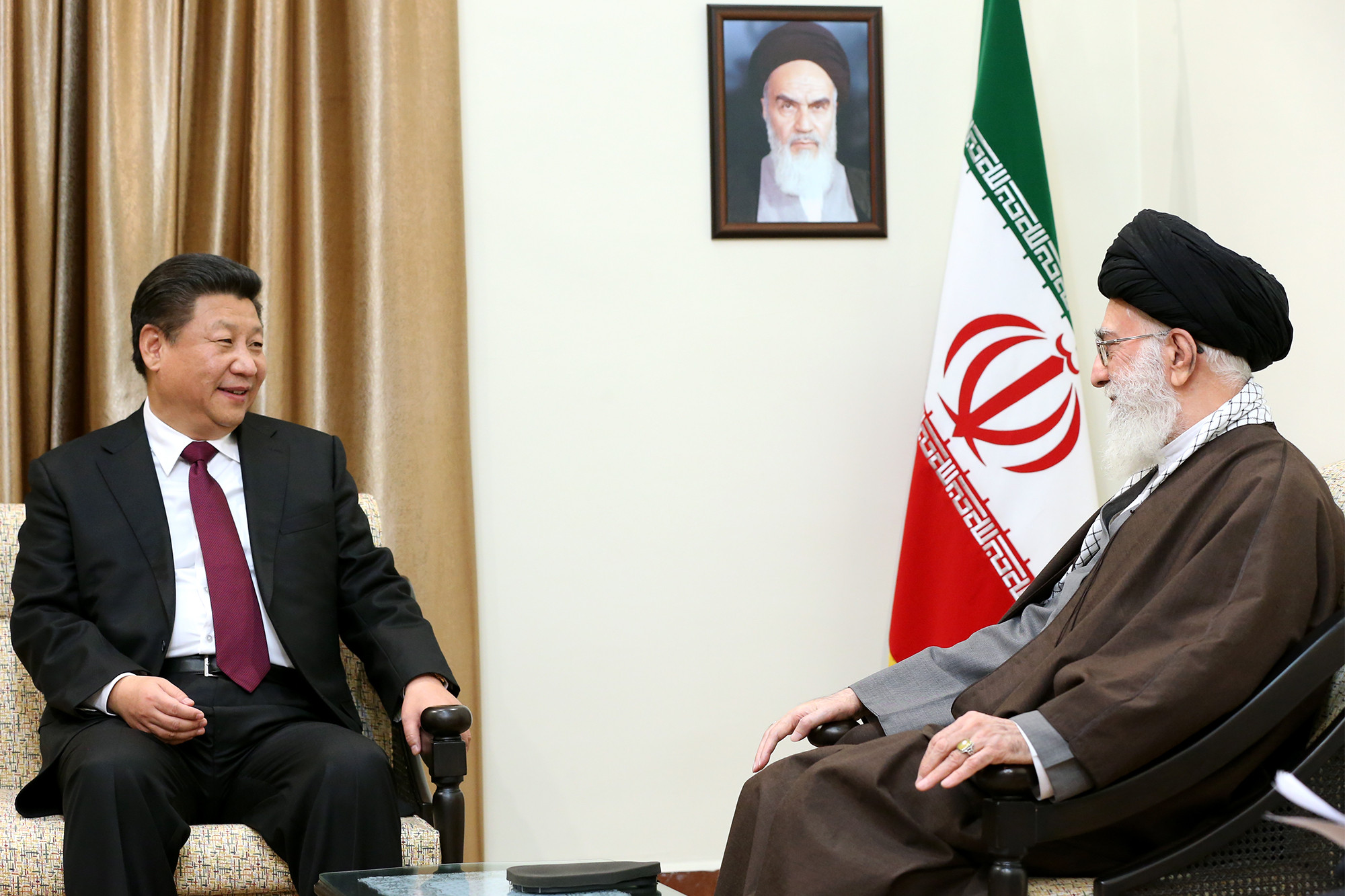
Xi with Iran's supreme leader Ali Khamenei, 23 January 2016

While China has historically been wary of getting closer to the Middle East countries, Xi has changed this approach. China's bilateral engagement and high-level diplomatic visits with the Gulf Cooperation Council countries reached a historical high point during Xi's tenure.

China has grown closer to both Iran and Saudi Arabia under Xi. China sold ballistic missiles to Saudi Arabia and is helping build 7,000 schools in Iraq. In 2013, Xi proposed a peace deal between Israel and Palestine that entails a two-state solution based on the 1967 borders. Turkey, with whom relations were long strained over Uyghurs, has also grown closer to China. On 10 March 2023, Saudi Arabia and Iran agreed to restore diplomatic ties cut in 2016 after a deal brokered between the two countries by China following secret talks in Beijing.

=== North Korea ===
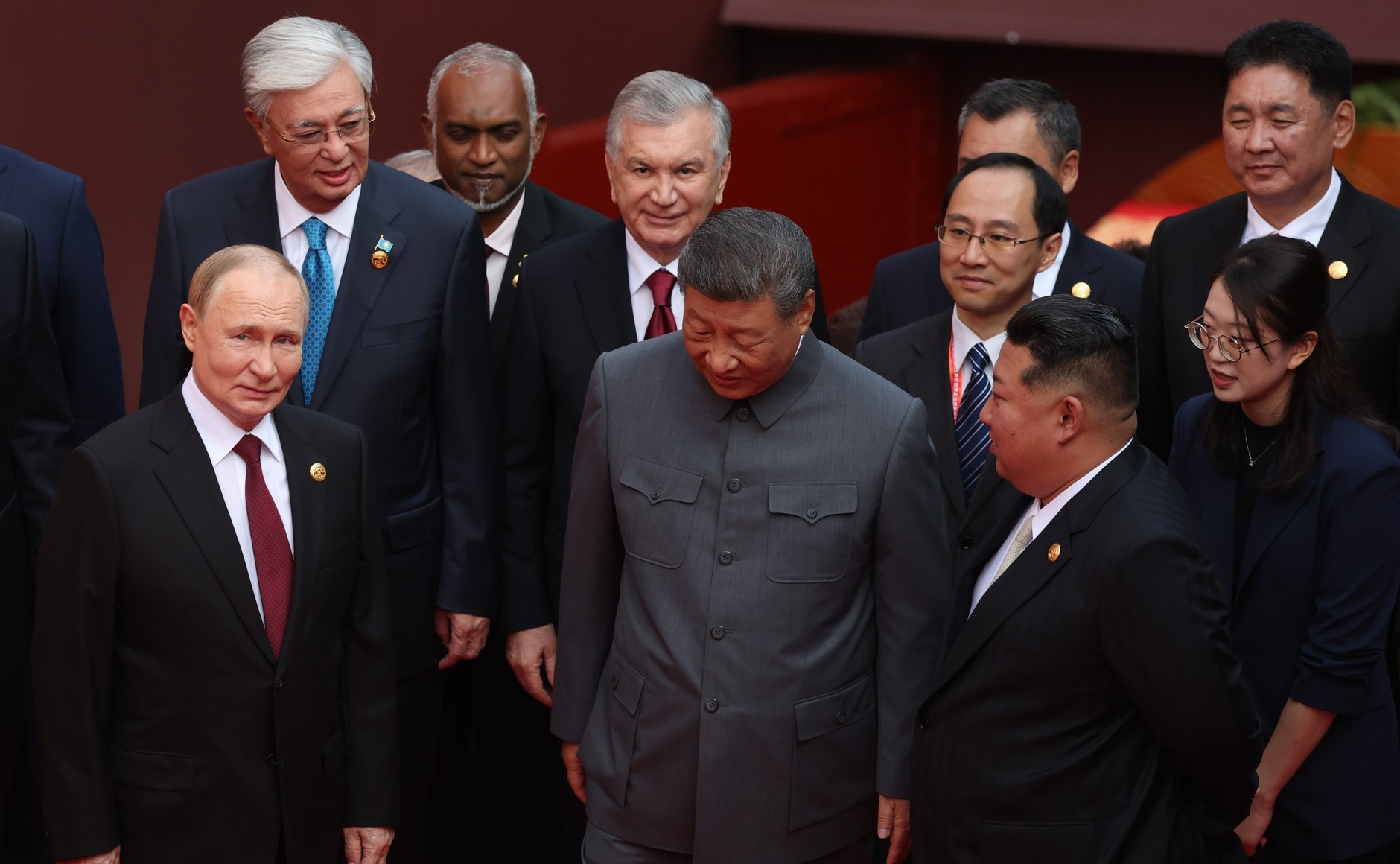
Xi Jinping with North Korean leader Kim Jong Un and Russian leader Vladimir Putin prior to the start of the 2025 China Victory Day Parade

Under Xi, China initially took a more critical stance on North Korea due to its nuclear tests. However, starting in 2018, the relations started to improve due to meetings between Xi and North Korean leader Kim Jong Un. Xi has also supported denuclearization of North Korea, and has voiced support for economic reforms in the country. At the G20 meeting in Japan, Xi called for a "timely easing" of sanctions imposed on North Korea. After the 20th CCP National Congress in 2022, Rodong Sinmun, official newspaper of the ruling Workers' Party of Korea, wrote a long editorial praising Xi, titling both Kim and Xi Suryong (수령), a title historically reserved for North Korea's founder Kim Il Sung.

=== Southeast Asia ===
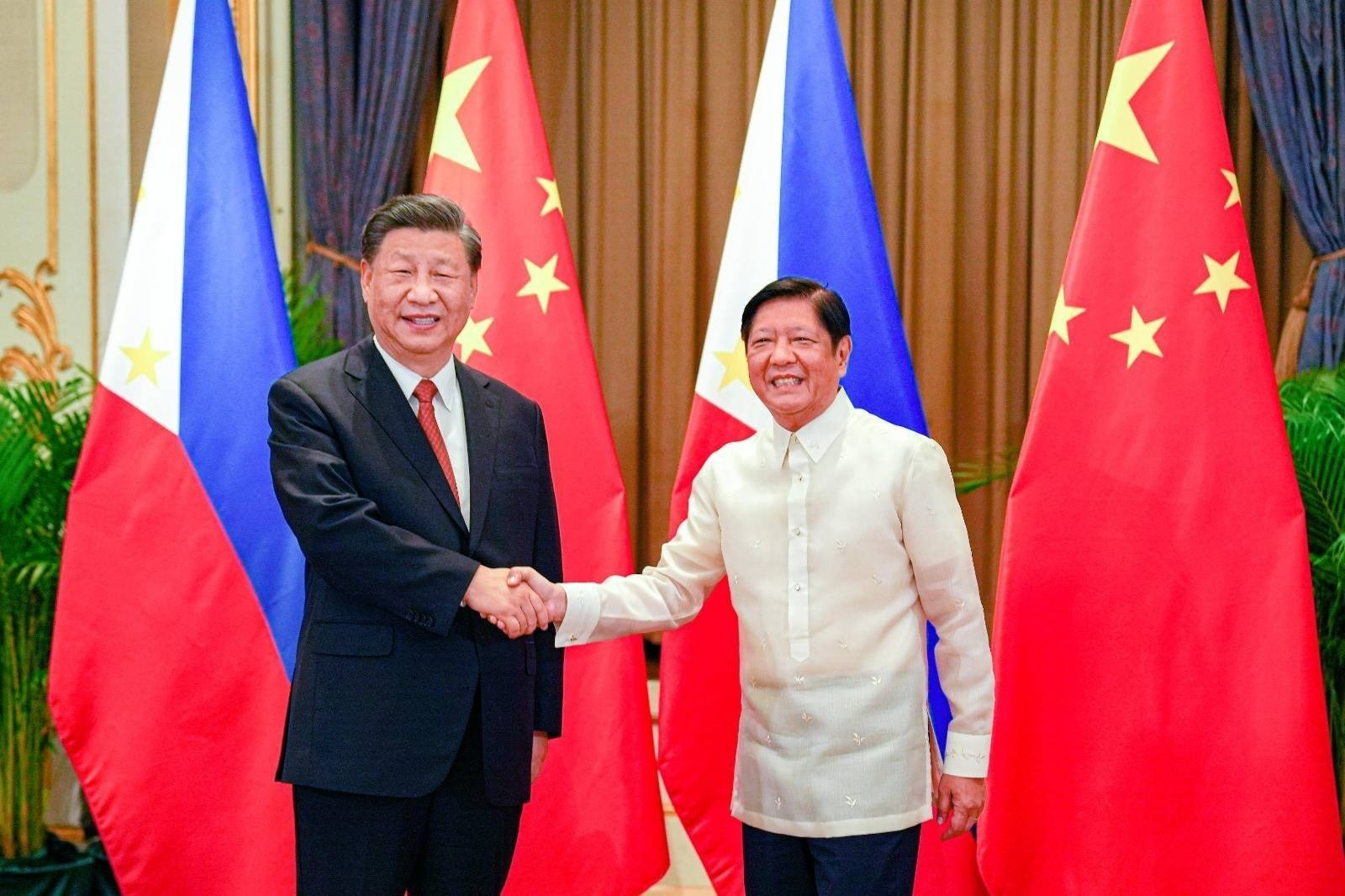
Xi Jinping with Philippine President Bongbong Marcos in Bangkok, November 2022

Since Xi came to power, China has been rapidly building and militarizing islands in the South China Sea, a decision Study Times of the Central Party School of the Chinese Communist Party said was personally taken by Xi. In April 2015, new satellite imagery revealed that China was rapidly constructing an airfield on Fiery Cross Reef in the Spratly Islands of the South China Sea. In November 2014, in a major policy address, Xi called for a decrease in the use of force, preferring dialogue and consultation to solve the current issues plaguing the relationship between China and its South East Asian neighbors.

=== South Korea ===
Xi has initially improved relationships with South Korea, and the two countries signed a free-trade agreement in December 2015. Starting in 2017, China's relationship with South Korea soured over the Terminal High Altitude Area Defence (THAAD), a missile defense system, which South Korea decided to deploy. China saw as a threat but South Korea said it was a defense measure against North Korea. Ultimately, South Korea halted the further deployment of the THAAD after China imposed unofficial sanctions. China's relations with South Korea improved again under president Moon Jae-in.

=== Vietnam ===
In 2020, for the celebration of Vietnam's 75th National Day, CCP general secretary Xi Jinping and CPV general secretary Nguyễn Phú Trọng reaffirmed their bilateral ties while looking back saying: "In the past 70 years, although there have been some ups and downs in bilateral relations, friendship and cooperation had always been the main flow." Nguyễn Phú Trọng visited China in 2022 where he met Xi, becoming the first foreign leader to meet Xi after he secured a third term in the 20th CCP National Congress. Both leaders released a joint statement, calling for cooperation in economic, political, defense and security areas and working together in "the fight against terrorism, 'peaceful evolution', 'colour revolution' and the politicisation of human rights issues".

On 12 December 2023, Vietnam and China announced 36 cooperation agreements during a visit by Xi to Vietnam. The agreements addressed a variety of issues, including cross-border rail development, digital infrastructure, and establishing joint patrols in the Gulf of Tonkin and a hotline to handle South China Sea fishing incidents. The two countries also issued a joint statement to support building a Community of Common Destiny.

In April 2025, Xi Jinping visited Vietnam to reaffirm bilateral relations and to urge Vietnam to oppose "unilateral bullying" in response to US President Donald Trump's Liberation Day tariffs. Xi also met with General Secretary Tô Lâm and Vietnamese Prime Minister Phạm Minh Chính. During the visit, the two countries signed 45 agreements aimed at strengthening bilateral relations. These agreements covered a range of sectors, including supply chain integration, artificial intelligence, joint maritime patrols, and railway infrastructure development.

== Europe ==
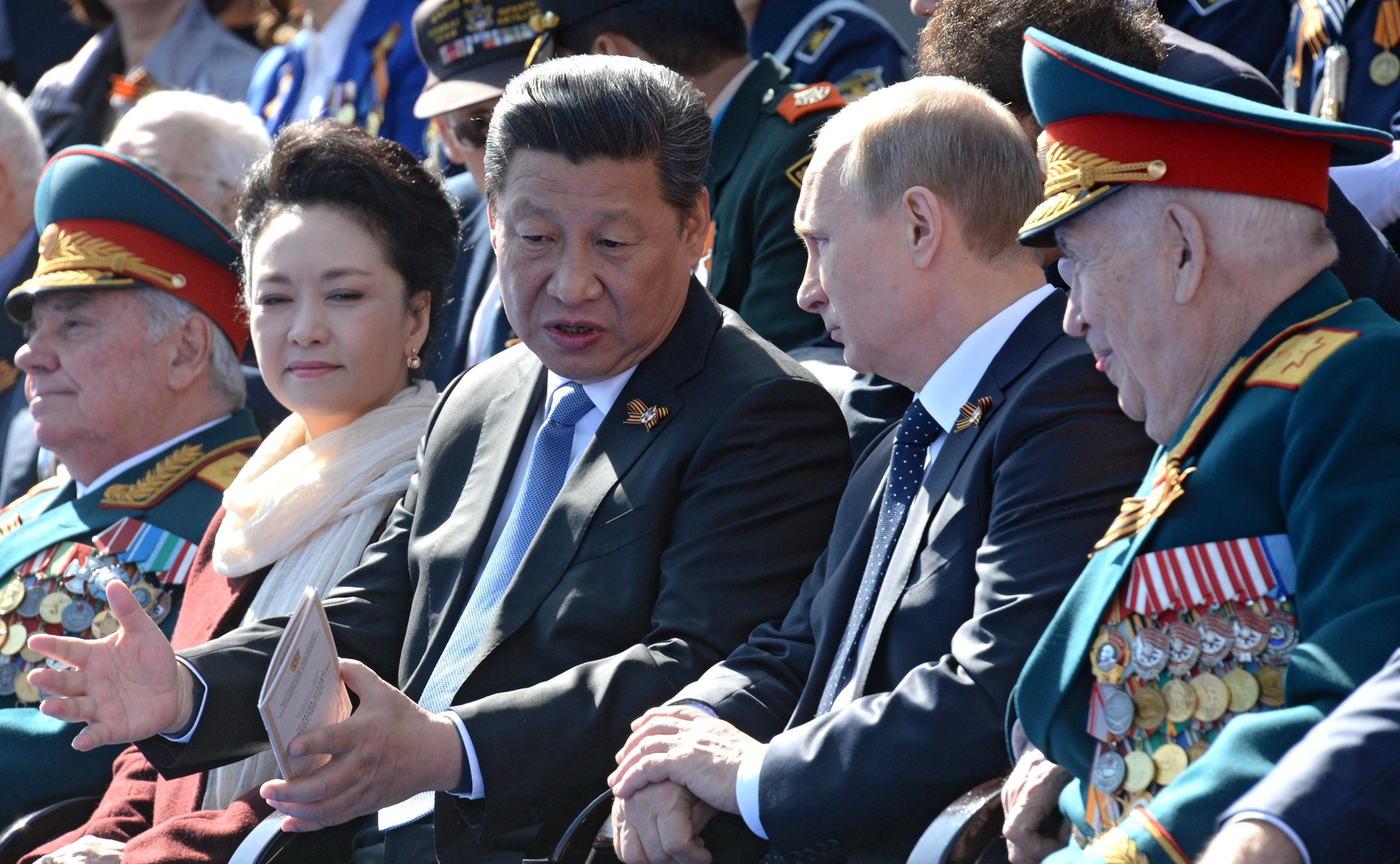
Xi with the first lady during the Moscow Victory Day Parade on 9 May 2015

=== European Union ===
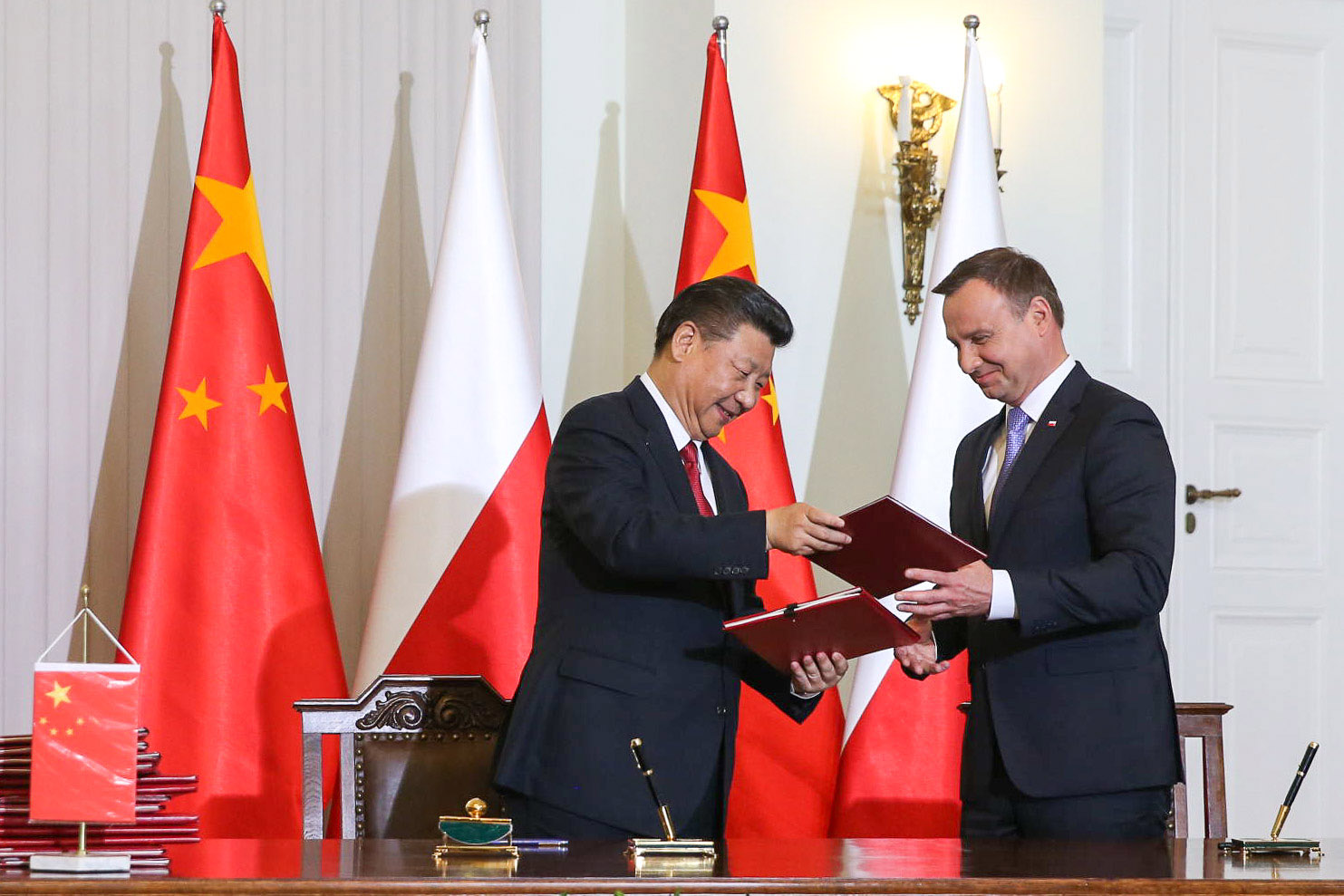
Xi in an official visit to Warsaw, where he and Poland's president Andrzej Duda signed a declaration on strategic partnership.

China's efforts under Xi has been for the European Union (EU) to stay in a neutral position in their contest with the U.S. China and the EU announced the Comprehensive Agreement on Investment (CAI) in 2020, although the deal was later frozen due to mutual sanctions over Xinjiang. Xi has supported calls for EU to achieve "strategic autonomy," and has also called on the EU to view China "independently."

Speaking at the World Economic Forum in Davos on 20 January 2026, French President Emmanuel Macron specifically called for increased Chinese foreign direct investment (FDI) in key European sectors to boost growth and facilitate technology transfer. He urged China to move beyond simply exporting products to Europe and instead focus on local manufacturing and physical presence on the continent.

=== Russia ===
Xi has cultivated stronger relations with Russia, particularly in the wake of the Ukraine crisis of 2014. He seems to have developed a strong personal relationship with president Vladimir Putin. Both are viewed as strong leaders with a nationalist orientation who are not afraid to assert themselves against Western interests. The pair met 40 times from 2013 to 2025. On the eve of a 2013 state visit to Moscow by Chinese leader Xi Jinping, Russian President Vladimir Putin remarked that the two nations were forging a special relationship. Xi visited the Operational Command Headquarters of the Russian Armed Forces, the first time a foreign leader visited the building. Xi attended the opening ceremonies of the 2014 Winter Olympics in Sochi. Under Xi, China signed a $400 billion gas deal with Russia; China has also become Russia's largest trading partner. In May 2015, Xi Jinping visited Russia to attend the Moscow Victory Day Parade; the two countries upgraded their relationship to a "comprehensive strategic partnership". The two sides also signed agreements on joint assembly of a long-range passenger aircraft and the construction of a high-speed railway line from Moscow to Kazan.

Xi and Putin met on 4 February 2022 during the run up to the 2022 Beijing Olympics during the massive Russian build-up of force on the Ukrainian border, with the two expressing that the two countries are nearly united in their anti-US alignment and that both nations shared "no limits" to their commitments. U.S. officials said that China had asked Russia to wait for the invasion of Ukraine until after the Beijing Olympics ended on 20 February. In April 2022, Xi Jinping expressed opposition to sanctions against Russia. On 15 June 2022, Xi Jinping reasserted China's support for Russia on issues of sovereignty and security. However, Xi also said China is committed to respecting "the territorial integrity of all countries," and said China was "pained to see the flames of war reignited in Europe." China has additionally kept a distance from Russia's actions, instead putting itself as a neutral party. In February 2023, China released a 12-point peace plan to "settle the acute crisis in Ukraine"; the plan was praised by Putin but criticized by the U.S. and European countries.

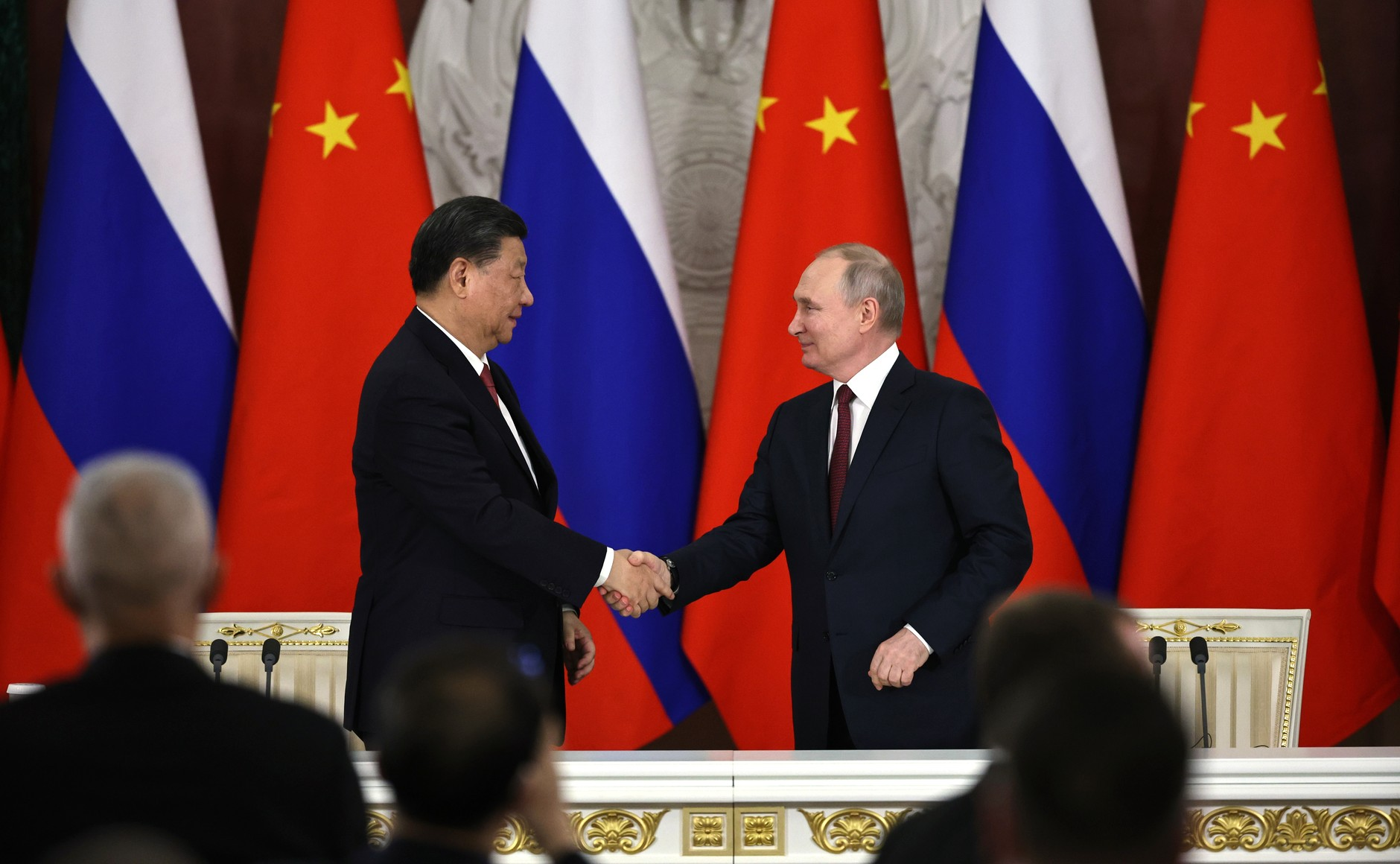
Vladimir Putin welcomes Xi in Moscow during Xi's visit to Russia in March 2023

During the war Ukrainian president Volodymyr Zelenskyy has given a nuanced take to China, saying that the country has the economic leverage to pressure Putin to end the war, adding "I'm sure that without the Chinese market for the Russian Federation, Russia would be feeling complete economic isolation. That's something that China can do – to limit the trade [with Russia] until the war is over." In August 2022, Zelenskyy said that since the beginning of the war in Ukraine, Xi Jinping did not respond to his requests for direct talks with him. He additionally said that while he would like China to take a different approach to the war in Ukraine, he also wanted the relationship to improve every year and said that China and Ukraine shared similar values.

On 20–22 March 2023, Xi Jinping visited Russia and met with Vladimir Putin both in official and unofficial capacity, where both leaders signed the "Joint Statement on Deepening the Comprehensive Strategic Partnership of Coordination for the New Era". It was the first international meeting of Vladimir Putin since the International Criminal Court issued a warrant for his arrest. In May 2023, Russian Prime Minister Mikhail Mishustin and Deputy Prime Minister Alexander Novak visited Beijing and met Xi Jinping. On 26 April 2023, Zelenskyy and Xi held their first phone call since the start of the war. In May 2025, Xi Jinping visited Russia to attend the Moscow Victory Day Parade. In September 2025, Chinese leader Xi Jinping and Russian President Vladimir Putin attended the China Victory Day Parade in Beijing.

== See also ==
- Xi Jinping Thought on Diplomacy
- Global Security Initiative
