= Yang Jiechi =

Chinese senior diplomat and politician

- 杨洁篪
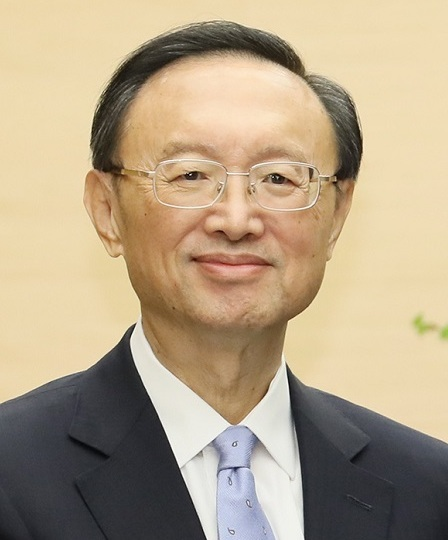
- Yang in February 2020

Director of the Office of the Central Foreign Affairs Commission (Note: Office was known as the "Director of the Office of the Central Foreign Affairs Leading Group" before March 2018.)
- In office August 2013 – 1 January 2023
- Deputy: Liu Jianchao
- General Secretary: Xi Jinping
- Foreign Minister: Wang Yi
- Preceded by: Dai Bingguo
- Succeeded by: Wang Yi

State Councilor of China
- In office 16 March 2013 – 19 March 2018 Serving with Yang Jing, Chang Wanquan, Guo Shengkun, Wang Yong
- Premier: Li Keqiang

10th Minister of Foreign Affairs
- In office 27 April 2007 – 16 March 2013
- Premier: Wen Jiabao
- Deputy: Zhang Zhijun
- Preceded by: Li Zhaoxing
- Succeeded by: Wang Yi

Personal details
- Born: May 1, 1950 (age 76) Shanghai, People's Republic of China
- Party: Chinese Communist Party (1971–present)
- Education: Ealing College; University of Bath; London School of Economics; Nanjing University (PhD)
- Nickname: Tiger Yang

Chinese name
- Simplified Chinese: 杨洁篪
- Traditional Chinese: 楊潔篪
Transcriptions
Standard Mandarin
- Hanyu Pinyin: Yáng Jiéchí
Yue: Cantonese
- Jyutping: Joeng4 Git1ci4

Yang Jiechi (Chinese: 杨洁篪; pinyin: Yáng Jiéchí; born May 1, 1950) is a Chinese senior diplomat and politician. He served as director of the Chinese Communist Party's Central Foreign Affairs Commission from 2013 and 2022, State Councilor from 2013 to 2018, Minister of Foreign Affairs of China from 2007 to 2013.

Yang previously served as Chinese Ambassador to the United States from 2000 to 2004, Deputy Minister of Foreign Affairs from 1998 to 2007, Assistant Minister of Foreign Affairs from 1995 to 1998, and Chinese Envoy to the United States from 1993 to 1995. He joined the Ministry of Foreign Affairs in 1972, after previously served as a worker at the Shanghai City Pujiang Electric Meter Factory from 1968 to 1972.

Yang studied international relations at Ealing College, University of Bath, and London School of Economics from 1973 to 1975. He received a Doctor of History in world history from Nanjing University in 2006 through an on-the-job graduate program.

== Early life and education ==
Yang was born in Shanghai on May 1, 1950. In 1963, he was admitted to the Shanghai Foreign Language School. Affected by the Cultural Revolution, he dropped out of school in 1968 and entered Shanghai Pujiang Electric Meter Factory as a worker. During the four years in the factory, he still insisted on learning English and maintained his foreign language proficiency. Yang joined the Chinese Communist Party (CCP) in 1971.

After U.S. president Richard Nixon visited China in 1972, Premier Zhou Enlai instructed that China should accelerate the training of new foreign language talents to meet the needs of the development of the international situation. In 1972 and 1973, the Ministry of Foreign Affairs selected more than 130 people, including Yang. He graduated from Shanghai Foreign Language School and attended the Ealing College, University of Bath and the London School of Economics from 1973 to 1975. From 2001 to 2006, He received a Ph.D. in world history from Nanjing University through distance education while serving as Chinese Ambassador to the United States from 2000 to 2004 and later Deputy Minister of Foreign Affairs.

== Career ==
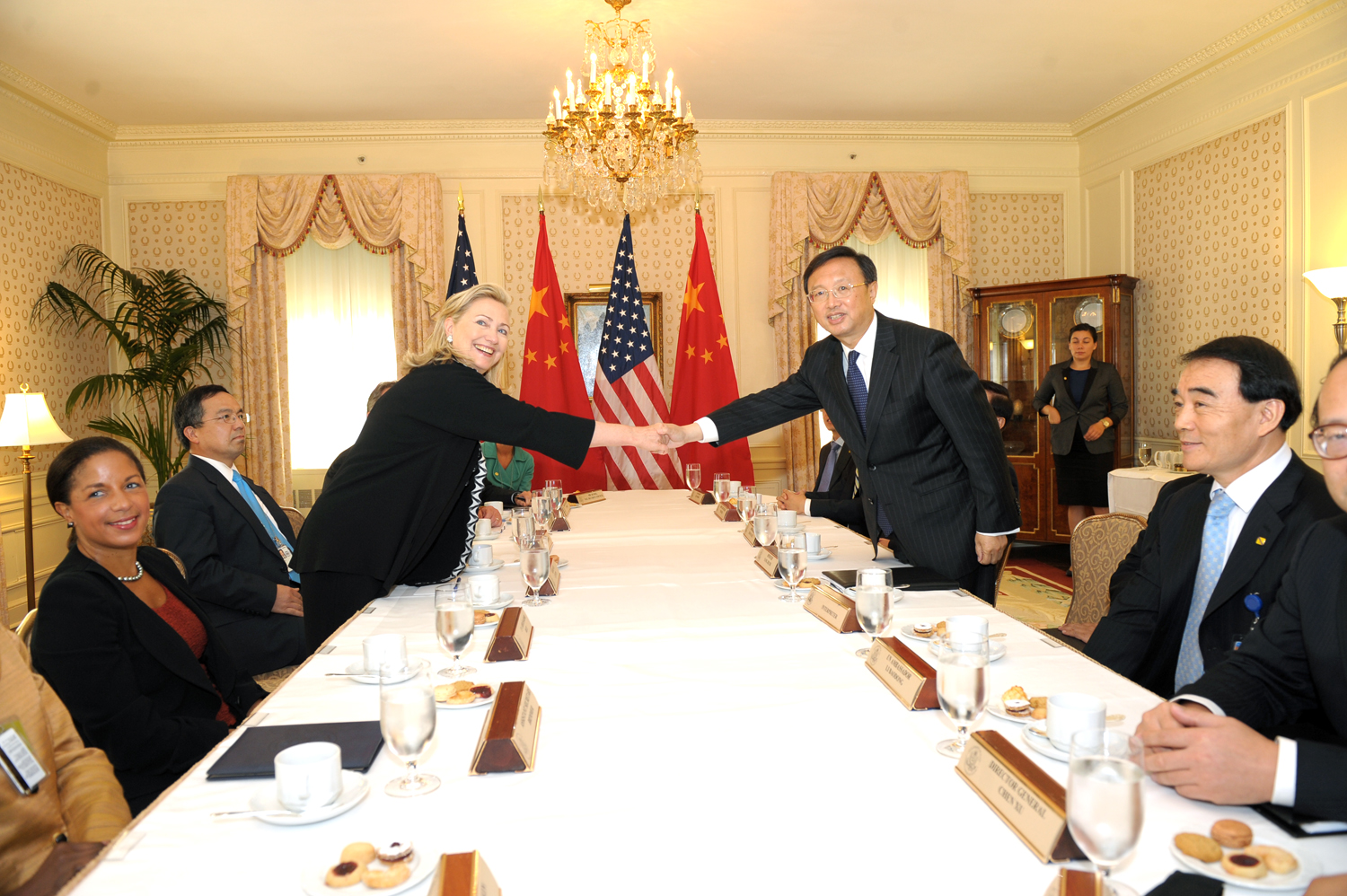
Yang Jiechi with the United States Secretary of State Hillary Clinton

From 1975 to 1983, Yang served as a staff member and Second Secretary at the Translation and Interpretation Department of the Foreign Ministry. During the late 1970s, Yang served as an interpreter for George H. W. Bush, who worked at the US Liaison Office in China at the time, and his family during a visit to Tibet.

From 1983 to 1987, he was appointed as Second Secretary and Counselor at the Chinese Embassy in Washington, D.C. He then returned to the Translation and Interpretation Department in 1987, working there as its director and counselor until 1990. During the Tiananmen Square Protests of 1989, Yang accompanied Wan Li, the chairman of the National People's Congress, on a trip to North America.

Between 1990 and 1993, he worked as the deputy director of the North American and Oceania Affairs Department of the Foreign Ministry, Between 1993 and 1995, he returned to the embassy in Washington, D.C., serving as Minister and Deputy Chief of Mission. In 1995, he was appointed as an Assistant Minister of Foreign Affairs. He was promoted to Vice Minister of Foreign Affairs in 1998, becoming the youngest vice foreign minister in PRC history; he was responsible for Latin America and Hong Kong, Macau, and Taiwan.

In February 2001, he was appointed as the Chinese Ambassador to the United States. During his tenure as ambassador to the United States, Yang worked to ease the tensions between the two countries following the 2001 mid-air collision between a U.S. EP-3 spy plane and a Chinese fighter jet off the coast of Hainan Island in the South China Sea. In 2004, Yang had a heart attack that was nearly fatal; he was taken to the George Washington University Hospital and treated by doctors of Vice President Dick Cheney. He returned to China in March 2005. In 2005, he was again appointed as Vice Minister of Foreign Affairs.

=== Minister of Foreign Affairs ===
In April 2007, Yang replaced Li Zhaoxing, who had been China's foreign minister since 2003, as the 10th foreign minister of China.

In July 2010, at the ASEAN Ministers Conference in Hanoi, Yang, responding to remarks by U.S. Secretary of State Hillary Clinton on freedom of navigation in the South China Sea, called the remarks "an attack on China" and told Singapore's Minister for Foreign Affairs George Yeo that "China is a big country and other countries are small countries, and that's just a fact."; however, Yang issued a statement on the Foreign Ministry's Web site saying that there was no need to internationalize the issue, that China was still intent on solving all of the disputes bilaterally.

In a meeting with Australia's foreign minister Bob Carr, Yang criticized the decision to put US Marines in Australia's Northern Territory by stating to Carr "Cold War alliances" were out of date, to which Carr "reminded Yang that Chinese leaders like to relate the story of the Ming dynasty admiral Zheng He who took powerful Chinese fleets as far afield as India and Arabia but sought to occupy no lands".

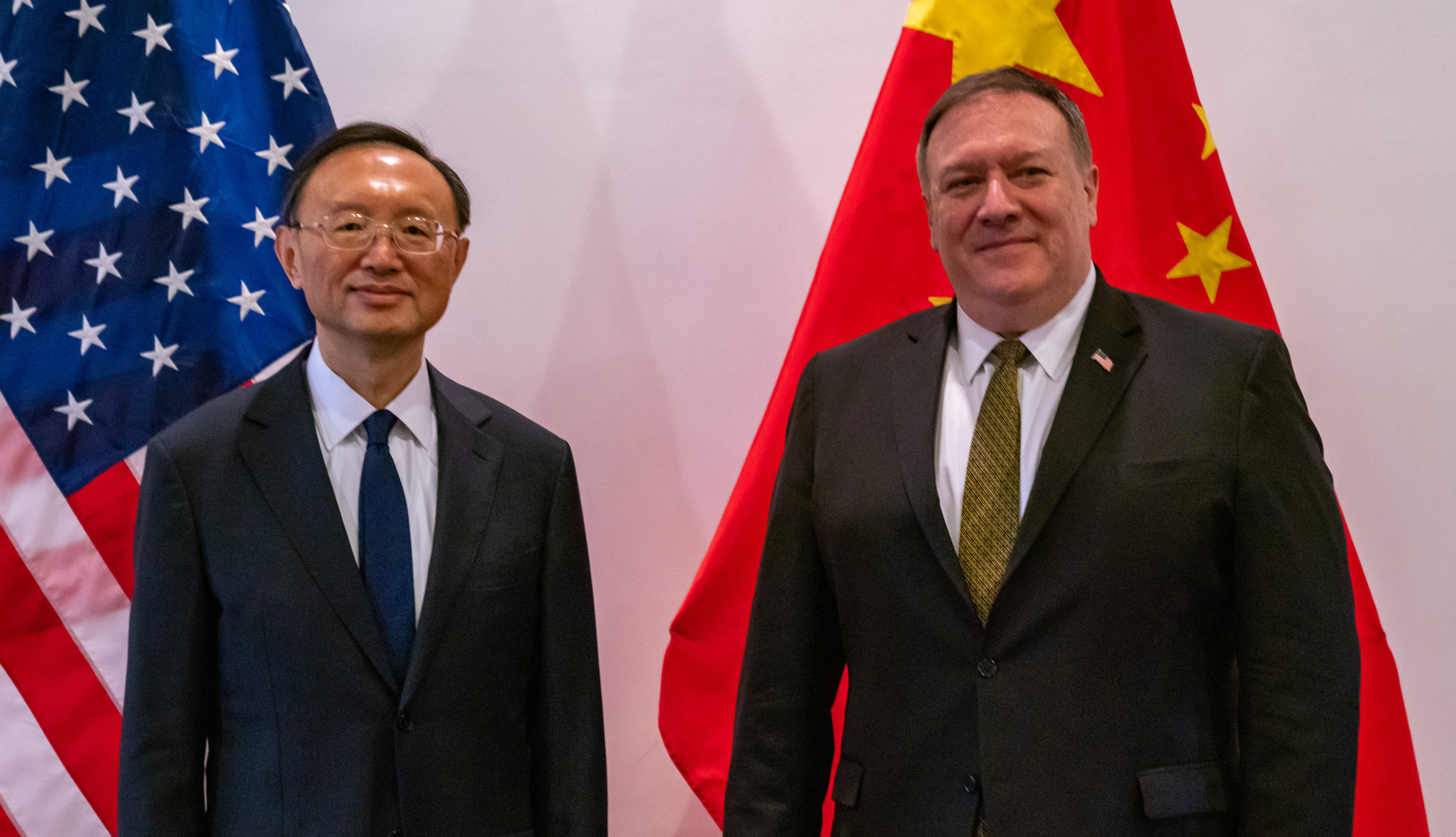
Yang meets with U.S. Secretary of State Michael R. Pompeo in Honolulu, HI on June 17, 2020.

In 2013, Yang Jiechi met with Japan's new ambassador to China and leader of Japan's New Komeito party. Yang also held group meetings with ambassadors from EU and its member states. He also met with Moo-sung Kim, Special envoy of South Korea's president-elect Park Geun-hye, to strengthen ties with South Korea. Yang has also made pledges for more contribution to world peace.

=== Director of the CCP Foreign Affairs Commission ===
At the first plenary session of the 12th National People's Congress in March 2013, Yang Jiechi was elected as State Councilor. In August 2013, he was appointed as the director of the Central Foreign Affairs Leading Group after Dai Bingguo stepped down. After the Leading Group was upgraded to the Central Foreign Affairs Commission in March 2018, Yang served as its director until 1 January 2023.

Following the result of the South China Sea Arbitration, Yang criticized the proceedings as having been influenced by "certain countries outside the region" in order to "deny China's sovereign rights and interests in the South China Sea".

Yang was a member of the 18th Central Committee of the Chinese Communist Party. He was also a member of the 17th CCP Central Committee and an alternate member of the 16th CCP Central Committee. He was elevated to the decision making Politburo at the 19th CCP Congress in October 2017.

In 2017, Yang incorporated the term "Great changes unseen in a century" into the CCP's rhetoric, describing it as a guiding tenet of Xi Jinping Thought on Diplomacy.

In 2019, Yang was described as "the most senior Chinese official to attend [the] Munich Security Conference since it began in 1963." He gave a keynote address.

==== Alaska Summit ====
In March 2021, Yang led the Chinese delegation for a strategic dialogue with the US in Alaska. The US team was headed by the Secretary of State Antony Blinken, in the first interaction with China during the Biden Administration. In the opening session in the presence of media, after 2-minute opening remarks by Blinken, Yang responded with an unexpected 16-minute speech. He said that it was necessitated by the "tone" of the US delegation. He harangued the United States for its human rights record, called it a global "champion of cyber attacks", and declared that "many people within the United States actually have little confidence in the democracy of the United States".

So for China, it was necessary that we made our position clear. So let me say here that, in front of the Chinese side, the United States does not have the qualification to say that it wants to speak to China from a position of strength.

These remarks went viral in China and Yang was praised for his forthrightness. The Washington Post said that the Biden Administration gets a taste of China's "wolf warrior" diplomacy. Although these statements were criticized as undiplomatic by Americans, they were popular and widely praised in China. Chinese commentators cited Yang's remarks as an example of China "standing up to imperialists."

==== Zurich Summit ====
In October 2021, Yang travelled to Zürich, Switzerland to meet with U.S. National Security Advisor Jake Sullivan to further discuss current issues regarding diplomatic relations and a possible virtual meeting between U.S. President Joe Biden and Chinese leader Xi Jinping. The virtual summit between the leaders eventually happened on 16 November 2021.

==== Retirement ====
After the 20th National Congress of the Chinese Communist Party in October 2022, Yang Jiechi left the Politburo. On 1 January 2023, Yang Jiechi officially retired from politics after he stepped down as the director of the Office of the Central Foreign Affairs Commission.

== Honors ==
- Hilal-i-Pakistan (Pakistan, 2012)
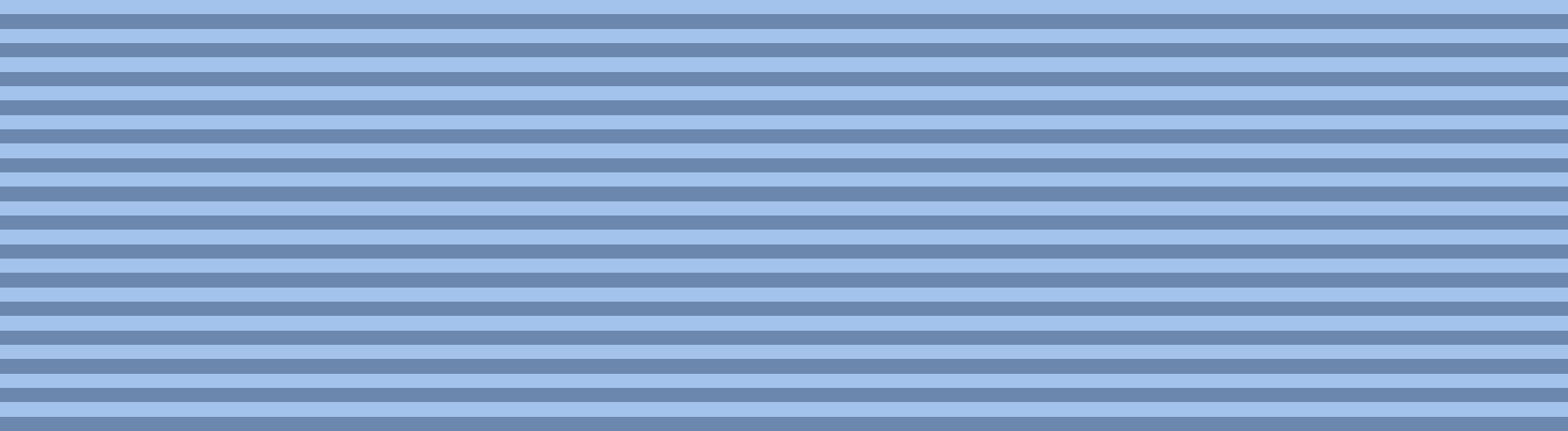
- Fifth Class of the Order of Yaroslav the Wise (Ukraine, 2010)

Yang Jiechi received in 2009 an honorary degree from the Geneva School of Diplomacy and International Relations.

== Nickname ==
George H. W. Bush said Yang Jiechi's other name is "Tiger Yang", because Yang Jiechi was born in 1950, the year of the Tiger according to the Chinese zodiac, and because his name, "Chi" (篪) contains a variant of "Hu" (虎, Tiger).

== Personal life ==
Yang is married to Le Aimei. Yang's daughter, Alice Yang, graduated from Sidwell Friends School and Yale University. He is highly proficient in English. According to Sinologist Peter Martin, Yang's daily routines as a diplomat included reading The New York Times every day and talking about details from its content during conversations with his counterparts. During interactions before the start of official meetings with foreign counterparts, Yang has been described as relaxed, telling jokes and anecdotes. However, he has also been described as angrily responding back during talks on sensitive topics; this negotiation approach, combining both charm and outrage, is described by Martin as "deliberate and carefully controlled".

Yang's younger brother Yang Jiemian serves as the chairman of the Academic Affairs Council of Shanghai Institutes for International Studies.

== See also ==
- Foreign policy of Xi Jinping
- Xi Jinping Thought on Diplomacy
- Central Foreign Affairs Commission

== Sources ==
- Martin, Peter (2021). China's Civilian Army: The Making of Wolf Warrior Diplomacy. Oxford University Press. doi:10.1093/oso/9780197513705.001.0001. ISBN 9780197513705.

Party political offices
Preceded by Dai Bingguo	Director of the Office of the Central Foreign Affairs Commission; March 2013－	Incumbent
Preceded by Dai Bingguo	Secretary-general of the CCP Central Leading Group for Taiwan Affairs; March 2013－	Incumbent
Diplomatic posts
Preceded by Li Zhaoxing	Chinese Ambassador to the United States; 2001–2005	Succeeded by Zhou Wenzhong
Government offices
Preceded by Li Zhaoxing	Foreign Minister of the People's Republic of China; 2007–2013	Succeeded by Wang Yi
