= Xi Jinping Thought on Diplomacy =

Foreign policy doctrine of the People's Republic of China

Xi Jinping Thought on Diplomacy (Chinese: 习近平外交思想) is the current diplomatic and foreign policy doctrine of the People's Republic of China. It is a part of the larger Xi Jinping Thought, which is a component of modern Chinese Communist Party ideology derived from the speeches of CCP general secretary Xi Jinping. It was established during the Central Conference on Work Relating to Foreign Affairs, held in June 2018.

According to Chinese foreign minister Wang Yi, Xi Jinping Thought on Diplomacy is "the fundamental guideline for China's diplomatic work is an epoch-making milestone in the diplomatic theory of New China." The main point of Xi Jinping Thought on Diplomacy is to orient as much of diplomacy as possible to the bilateral level, while still supporting the formal architecture of the international system. In terms of China's foreign policy, Xi Jinping's "major-country diplomacy" doctrine has replaced the earlier Deng Xiaoping era slogan of "keep a low profile and build up power" and has legitimized a more active role for China on the world stage, particularly with regard to reform of the international order, engaging in open ideological competition with the West, and assuming a greater responsibility for global affairs in accordance with China's rising power and status.

== History ==
During the first five years of Xi Jinping's leadership the budget for diplomacy doubled.

In 2017, state councillor Yang Jiechi incorporated the term "great changes unseen in a century" into the CCP's rhetoric, describing it as a guiding tenet of Xi Jinping Thought on Diplomacy.

Xi Jinping Thought on Diplomacy was officially adopted during the Central Conference on Work Relating to Foreign Affairs in June 2018.

In July 2020, the Ministry of Foreign Affairs inaugurated a research center named the Xi Jinping Thought on Diplomacy Studies Center. The center is part of the China Institute of International Studies.

== Content ==
According to the Central Foreign Affairs Work Conference held on 22-23 June 2018, Xi Jinping Thought on Diplomacy has ten insistences. These are insisting on:

1. strengthening the centralized and unified leadership of the Party over foreign affairs with the maintenance of the authority of the Party Central Committee as the overall guide;
2. promoting China's major-country diplomacy with Chinese characteristics with the mission of realizing the great rejuvenation of the Chinese nation;
3. promoting the building of a community of common destiny for humankind with the purpose of maintaining world peace and promoting common development;
4. strengthening strategic confidence with socialism with Chinese characteristics as the fundamental principle;
5. promoting the construction of the "Belt and Road" with the principle of extensive consultation, joint construction and shared benefits;
6. taking the path of peaceful development based on mutual respect and win-win cooperation;
7. building a global partnership based on deepening diplomatic layout;
8. leading the reform of the global governance system with the concept of fairness and justice;
9. safeguarding national sovereignty, security and development interests with the core interests of the country as the bottom line;
10. shaping the unique style of China's diplomacy with the combination of the fine traditions of foreign affairs and the characteristics of the times as the direction.

== Reception ==
Foreign observers have noted that China and the rest of the world play by different rules under Xi Jinping Thought on Diplomacy. This perceived endorsement of Chinese exceptionalism has been criticized as problematic. Wolf warrior diplomacy seems to be positively perceived by the domestic audience, especially those with a more Chinese nationalist point of view.

In terms of theory, parallels have been drawn to Maoist international relations theory, in particular to Mao Zedong's Three Worlds Theory.

The Global Security Initiative has been described as a "concrete manifestation" of Xi Jinping Thought on Diplomacy.

== See also ==
- Foreign policy of Xi Jinping
- Ten Major Relationships
