= Dwarkanath Kotnis =

Indian physician (1910–1942)

Dr. Dwarakanath Kotnis
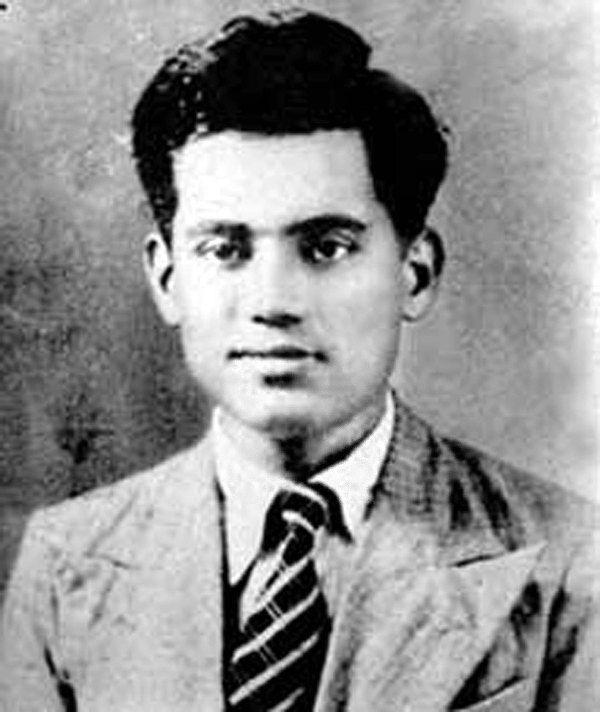
- Born: 10 October 1910; Solapur, Bombay Presidency, British India
- Died: 9 December 1942 (aged 32); Paoting, Republic of China
- Education: University of Bombay
- Occupation: Physician
- Spouse: Guo Qinglan
- Children: Yinhua (1942–1967)
- Parent: Shantaram Kotnis

Dwarakanath Shantaram Kotnis (10 October 1910 in India – 9 December 1942), also known by his Chinese name Ke Dihua (Chinese: 柯棣华; pinyin: Kē Dìhuá), was an Indian physician. He and four peers were dispatched to China for medical assistance during the Second Sino-Japanese War in 1938. Known for his dedication and perseverance, he has been regarded as an example for Sino-Indian friendship and collaboration.

Along with the Canadian Norman Bethune, he continues to be revered every year by the Chinese people during the Qingming Festival, a day used by the Chinese to commemorate the martyrs.

== Early life ==
Dwarakanath Kotnis was from middle-class Marathi in born in Solapur, Maharashtra, he had two brothers and five sisters. He studied medicine at the Grant Medical College of the University of Bombay.

== Indian medical mission ==
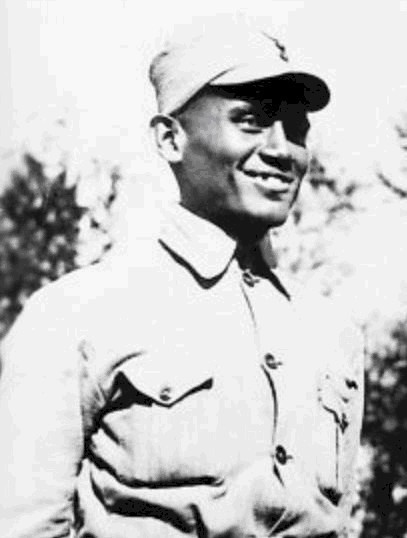
Dwarkanath Kotnis in China

In 1938, after the Japanese invasion of China, the communist General Zhu De requested Jawaharlal Nehru to send some physicians to China. Netaji Subhash Chandra Bose, the President of the Indian National Congress, made an appeal to the people through a press statement on 30 June 1938. He arranged to send a team of volunteer doctors and an ambulance by collecting a fund of Rs 22,000 on the All-Indian China Day and China Fund days on 7–9 July. Netaji Subhash Chandra Bose also wrote an article in Modern Review on Japan's role in the Far East and announced the assault on China. The key aspect of this mission was that it was a helping hand from a nation itself struggling for freedom, to another nation also struggling for its freedom. The mission was reinforced with Nehru's visit to China in 1939.

Dwarkanath Kotnis, born in a middle class Maharashtrian family from Solapur on 10 October 1910, had then graduated from the Seth G S Medical College, Bombay and was preparing for post-graduation. He asked permission of his family to volunteer for service abroad. Dwarkanath's younger sister Manorama recalls that her brother wanted to travel around the world and practice medicine at different places. She said "most members of the family knew little about China at that time. We only knew that people used to come and sell Chinese silk," While his father Shantaram encouraged young Dwarkanath to venture out, his mother was very sad because he was going that far and worse, in a war zone.

A medical team of five doctors (Drs. M. Atal from Allahabad (who was also the leader of the mission), M. Cholkar from Nagpore, D. Kotnis from Sholapur, B.K. Basu and Debesh Mukherjee from Calcutta) was dispatched as the Indian Medical Mission Team in September 1938. All, except Dr. Kotnis, returned to India safely.

The team first arrived in China at the port of Hankou, Wuhan. They were then sent to Yan'an, the revolutionary base at the time in 1939, where they were warmly welcomed by Mao Zedong, Zhu De and other top leaders of the Chinese Communist Party (CCP), as they were the first medical team to come from another Asian country.

The 28-year-old Doctor came as a part of the five member team and stayed in China for almost 5 years working in mobile clinics to treat wounded soldiers. In 1939, Dr. Kotnis joined the Eighth Route Army (led by Mao Zedong) at the Jin-Cha-Ji border region near the Wutai Mountain Area, after his efforts all across the northern China region.

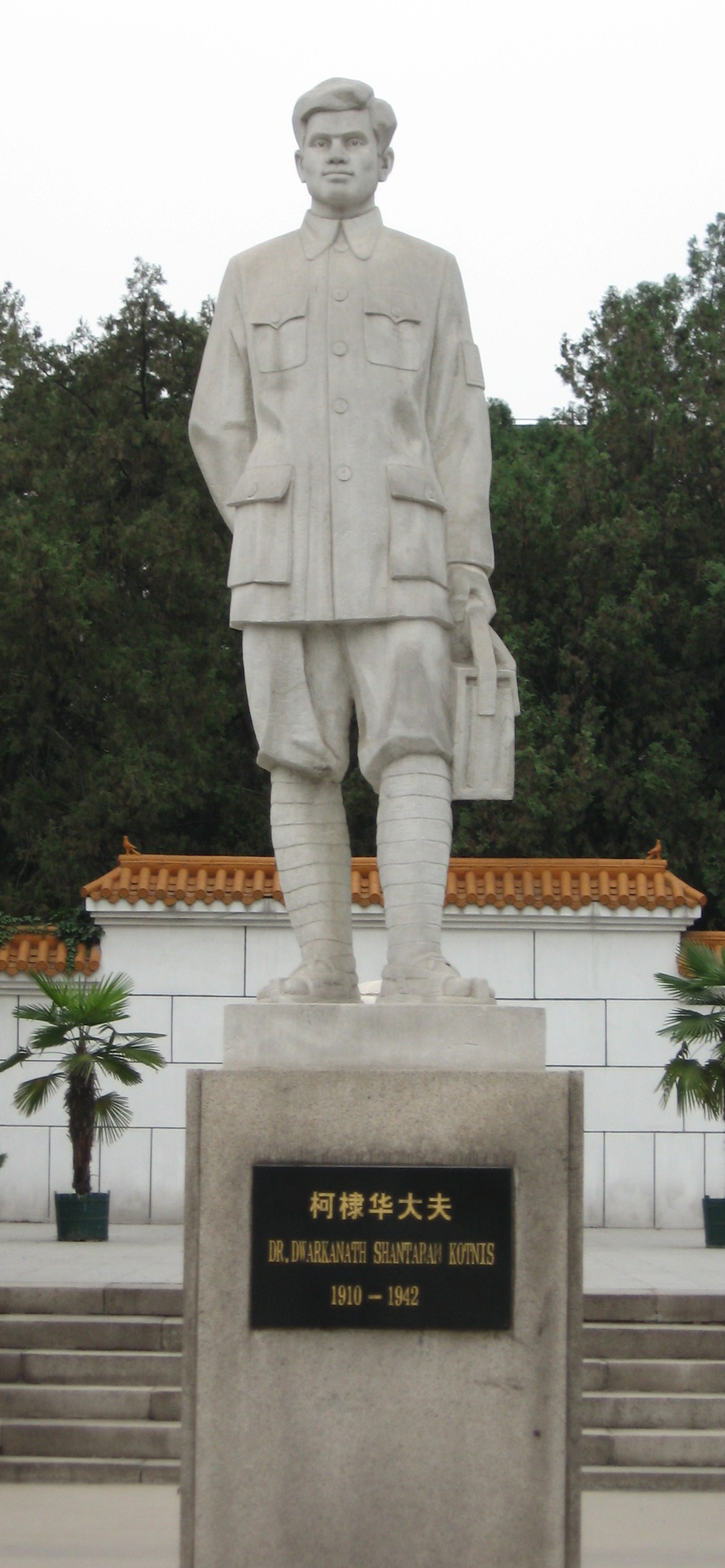
A statue of Dwarkanath Kotnis in Shijiazhuang, Hebei, China.

His job as a battlefront doctor was stressful, where there was always an acute shortage of medicines. In one long-drawn out battle against Japanese troops in 1940, Dr. Kotnis performed operations for up to 72 hours, without getting any sleep. He treated more than 800 wounded soldiers during the battle. He was eventually appointed as the Director of the Dr. Bethune International Peace Hospital named after the famous Canadian surgeon Norman Bethune.

In 1940, Kotnis met Guo Qinglan, a nurse at the Bethune Hospital. They first met at the inauguration of Dr. Norman Bethune's tomb and Guo was immediately attracted to the Indian doctor. Kotnis could write and speak Chinese, which amazed her. The couple got married in December 1941. They had a son on 23 August 1942, who was named Yinhua – meaning India (Yin) and China (Hua), at the suggestion of Nie Rongzhen.

Kotnis wrote letters to his family regularly. "He sounded very happy in the letters. People used to come to thank him for his help. He was telling the good part," says Manorama. Every place he went in China, he described it in detail in his letters home. The whole family found them to be great fun because what he described was so different from the life in India.

The hardship of the stressful job as a front-line doctor finally started to take its toll on him and severely affected his health. Only three months after the birth of Yinhua, epilepsy struck Dr.Kotnis. A series of epileptic seizures killed him on 9 December 1942, leaving behind his widow Guo Qinglan, and the baby son.

Kotnis was buried in the Heroes Courtyard in Nanquan Village. At that time, Mao Zedong mourned his death by observing that "The army has lost a helping hand, the nation has lost a friend. Let us always bear in mind his internationalist spirit."

It is said that he joined the Chinese Communist Party on 7 July 1942, just before his death, but could not be verified.

During his mission, he was also a lecturer at the Dr. Bethune Hygiene School of the Jinchaji (晉察冀) Military Command, and the first director of the Dr. Bethune International Peace Hospital, Yan'an.

== Tribute ==
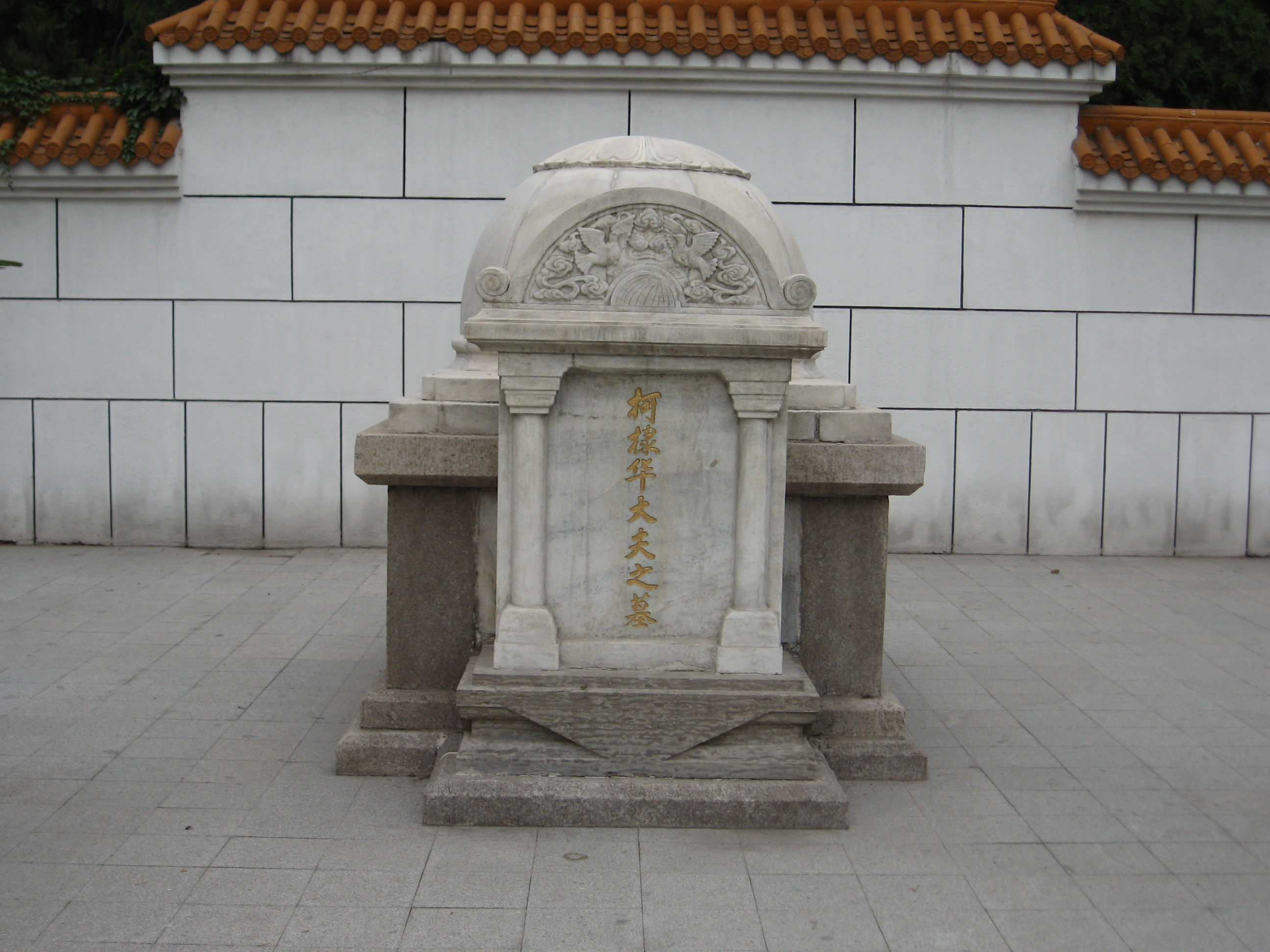
The tomb of Dwarkanath Kotnis in Shijiazhuang, Hebei, China.

Upon his death in 1942, Mao Zedong mourned his death by observing that:

The army has lost a helping hand, the nation has lost a friend. Let us always bear in mind his internationalist spirit.

Madame Sun Yat-sen said, concerning his role in the revolution, that "His memory belongs not only to your people and ours, but to the noble roll-call of fighters for the freedom and progress of all mankind. The future will honor him even more than the present, because it was for the future that he struggled."

The Martyr's Memorial park in Shijiazhuang city of the Northern Chinese province of Hebei is a famous attraction point. The north and south sides of the park are dedicated to the veterans of the Korean and the Japanese wars. The west side is dedicated to Dr. Norman Bethune, who fought for the Chinese, and the South side to Dr Kotnis. There is a great statue in his honour. A small museum there has a handbook of vocabulary that Kotnis wrote on his passage from India to China; some of the instruments that the surgeons used in their medical fight for life, and various photos of the doctors, some with the Chinese Communist Party's most influential figures, including Mao.

Kotnis is among the "foreign friends of China" that Xi Jinping cites in his foreign policy discourses in an effort to recognize the contributions of other countries to China's national liberation.

=== Memorial in Solapur, Maharashtra ===
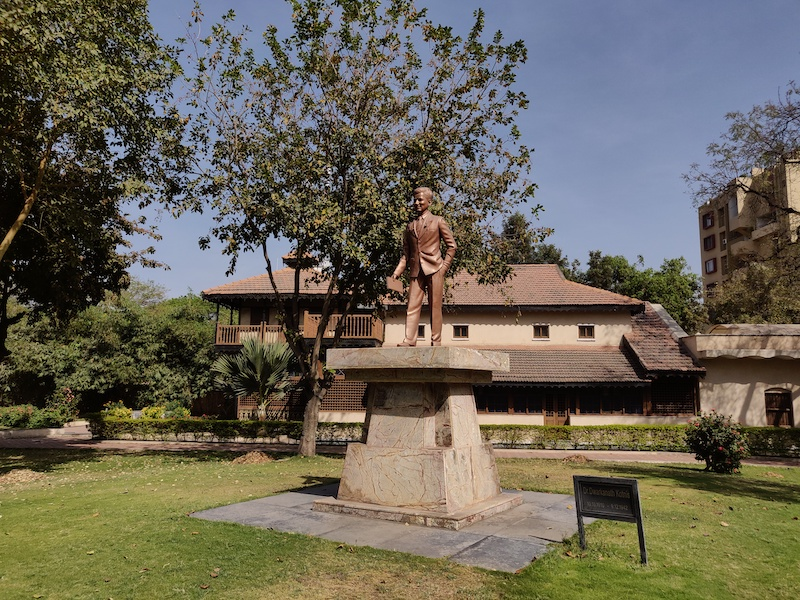
Dr. Kotnis memorial at Solapur

A memorial of Dwarkanath Shantaram Kotnis is installed in his birthplace in Solapur on 1 January 2012. The memorial, at his old residence, has been built by Solapur Municipal Corporation with efforts of Sushilkumar Shinde, who was Union Power Minister during the installation ceremony. Maharashtra Chief Minister Prithviraj Chavan was present at the function.

== Family ==
In November 1941, about a year before his death, Kotnis married Guo Qinglan, (Chinese: 郭庆兰; pinyin: Guō Qìnglán, born 15 September 1916 in Fenyang County, Shanxi Province) a nurse at the Bethune International Peace Hospital. Kotnis and Guo had a son on 23 August 1942. At the suggestion of Nie Rongzhen they named the boy "Yinhua" combining the Chinese characters for "Yin" (印) for India and "Hua" (华) for China. Yinhua died aged 24 in 1967 shortly before he was to graduate from medical college. His death has been attributed to medical negligence. In 1949, Guo remarried to a Chinese man with whom she had a son and a daughter. Guo Qinglan has been an honoured guest at many high-level diplomatic functions between China and India, such as the banquet Dalian Mayor Bo Xilai hosted for then Indian President K.R. Narayanan in June 2000 and during the visit of then Indian Prime Minister Vajpayee to Beijing in June 2003. In November 2006, she accompanied Chinese President Hu Jintao on a state visit to India. She died on 28 June 2012 at the age of 96 in Dalian, in Northeastern China.

== In film ==
- The story of his life was the subject of a Hindi film with the title Dr. Kotnis Ki Amar Kahani (1946, English: The Immortal Story of Dr. Kotnis), scripted by Khwaja Ahmad Abbas, and directed by V. Shantaram, who also portrayed Kotnis in the film.
- His life was also the subject of a Chinese film Kē Dì Huá Dài Fū (1982, Dr. D.S. Kotnis), with a screenplay by Huang Zongjiang.

== Honours ==
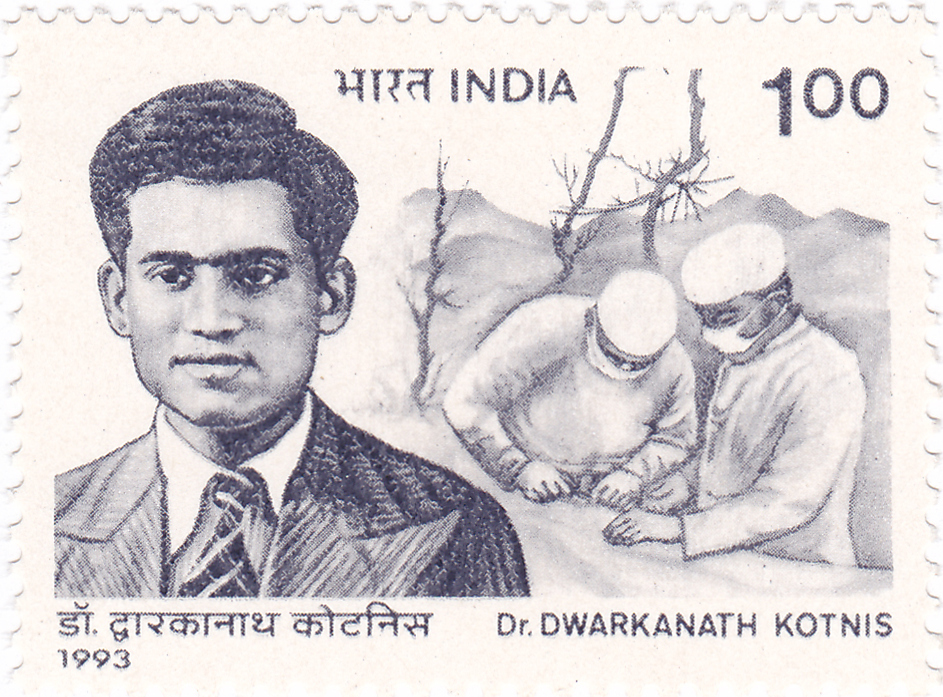
Kotnis on a 1993 stamp of India

Both China (1982 and 1992) and India (1993) have honoured him with stamps.

The Chinese government continues to honour his relatives in India during every high-level official trip. His relatives (primarily sisters) were visited in Mumbai by:

- the then Premier Zhou Enlai in 1950
- the then President and CCP General Secretary Jiang Zemin visited India in 1996, he sent flowers to the Kotnis family.
- the then Premier Li Peng in 2001
- the then Premier Zhu Rongji in 2002
- the then President and CCP General Secretary Hu Jintao in 2006
- the then Premier Li Keqiang in 2013
- The current President Xi Jinping – who also holds the positions of General Secretary of the Chinese Communist Party and Chairman of the Central Military Commission, making him China's paramount leader – met Dr Kotnis' sister Manorama during Sept 2014.

Dwarkanath Kotnis is commemorated together with Dr. Bethune in the Martyrs' Memorial Park (Lieshi Lingyuan) in Shijiazhuang, Hebei province, China. The entire south side of the memorial is dedicated to Dr. Kotnis, where there is a great statue in his honour. A small museum there contains a handbook of vocabulary that Kotnis wrote on his passage from India to China, some of the instruments that the surgeons were forced to use in their medical fight for life, and various photos of the doctors, some with the CCP's most influential figures, including Mao.

In 2017, China presented University of Mumbai a restored handwritten condolence note written by Mao Zedong to Dr. Kotnis' family in 1950 upon his death.
