= Great changes unseen in a century =

Term in Chinese political rhetoric

Great changes unseen in a century (Chinese: 百年未有之大变局; pinyin: Bǎinián wèi yǒu zhī dà biànjú) is a political science phrase in Chinese Communist Party (CCP) rhetoric referring to geopolitical shifts, in which the decline of the United States as a hyperpower amongst widespread sociopolitical changes such as the rise of populism, political polarization and economic securitization in the West, as well as radical technological changes forecasting an upcoming industrial revolution, have created an environment of uncertainty and potentially a paradigm shift in world order that present significant challenges but also a rare window of opportunity for the rise of China as a new superpower. The concept was first coined by Ministry of State Security political scientist Yuan Peng in 2009, and has since become a common phrase in domestic propaganda within the People's Republic of China and in foreign policy discourse by general secretary Xi Jinping promoting the China's peaceful rise.

== Origin ==
Political scientist Yuan Peng of the Ministry of State Security (MSS) was the first to use the term "great changes unseen in a century" to refer to China's position in contemporary geopolitics. Yuan began using the term in his essays after the 2008 financial crisis. It became prominent following the publication of his book Changes Unseen in 400 Years: From Westphalia to a New World Order. Yuan's book described the Peace of Westphalia as the first major event in the formation of the current world order, followed by the Treaty of Versailles and the Yalta Conference. Yuan wrote that the world is now going through a fourth major change as a result of global population change, the advancement of technology through a Fourth Industrial Revolution, climate change (including energy transitions), and a shift in geopolitical power from the West to the East.

The European Council on Foreign Relations describes the phrase "Great changes unseen in a century" as echoing late Qing statesman Li Hongzhang's description of Western powers encroaching on China following the Opium Wars as "unprecedented changes unseen in Millenia" (数千年未有之大变局; shu qianian wei you zhi da bianju).

== Usage ==
In Chinese political discourse, "great changes unseen in a century" refers to geopolitical shifts in which the United States is seen as a declining power and in which the rise of populism, economic securitization, and advancing technology create an environment of uncertainty that results in both opportunities and threats for China.

In 2017, state councillor Yang Jiechi incorporated the term into the CCP's rhetoric, describing it as a guiding tenet of Xi Jinping Thought on Diplomacy. Xi then used the phrase in a speech to the 2018 Central Foreign Affairs Work Conference. Xi stated:

China now finds itself in the best period for development it has seen since the advent of the modern era; [simultaneously], the world faces great changes unseen in a century. These two [trends] are interwoven, advancing in lockstep; each stimulates the other. Now, and in the years to come, many advantageous international conditions exist for success in foreign affairs.

The term then became subject of significant academic discussion and by 2022, around 40,000 articles discussing the term appeared in China Integrated Knowledge Resources System. At the 20th National Congress of the Chinese Communist Party, Xi said:

Great changes unseen in a century are accelerating across the world… the once-in-a-century pandemic has had far-reaching effects; a backlash against globalization is rising; and unilateralism and protectionism are mounting… The world has entered a new period of turbulence and change… [where] external attempts to suppress and contain China may escalate at any time. Our country has entered a period of development in which strategic opportunities, risks, and challenges are concurrent and uncertainties and unforeseen factors are rising… We must therefore be more mindful of potential dangers, be prepared to deal with worst-case scenarios, and be ready to withstand high winds, choppy waters, and even dangerous storms.

Xi frequently uses the term in his foreign policy discourse to refer to the perceived decline of United States power both domestically and internationally, as well as the broader fragmentation of Western powers. The term received greater attention in media following a March 2023 meeting between Xi and Vladimir Putin.

== See also ==
- The East is rising and the West is declining
- Great rejuvenation of the Chinese nation
- China's peaceful rise
- Foreign policy of Xi Jinping
- Ideology of the Chinese Communist Party
