= Major-country diplomacy =

Policy of CCP General Secretary Xi Jinping

Major-country diplomacy (Chinese: 大国外交), also called major-country with Chinese characteristics (Chinese: 中国特色大国外交), is a term used to describe a type of diplomacy conducted by the People's Republic of China. It was first mentioned in March 2013, and has since become a component of Xi Jinping Thought on Diplomacy.

== History ==
The term was first mentioned in Chinese state-media in March 2013 just days after the conclusion of the first session of the 12th National People's Congress. The concept was further elaborated on by Chinese foreign minister Wang Yi on 27 June 2013, when he gave a speech to the World Peace Forum in Tsinghua University. Wang said that China needed to be more proactive in its diplomacy. In March 2016, major-country diplomacy was mentioned in the annual government work report.

According to Xi, the new type of major power relations is based on principles of "no confrontation or conflict", "mutual respect", and "win-win cooperation"

In terms of China's foreign policy, the major-country diplomacy doctrine has replaced the earlier Deng Xiaoping era slogan of "keep a low profile and build up power" and has legitimized a more active role for China on the world stage, particularly with regards to reform of the international order, engaging in open ideological competition with the West, and assuming a greater responsibility for global affairs in accordance with China's rising power and status. Major-country diplomacy is a component of Xi Jinping Thought on Diplomacy.
