= Hide your strength, bide your time =

Guiding philosophy of PRC's foreign policy in the Deng Xiaoping era

Hide your strength, bide your time (Traditional Chinese: 韜光養晦; Simplified Chinese: 韬光养晦) is a political slogan of the People's Republic of China, typically used to describe a tenet of China's foreign policy. It is commonly attributed to Deng Xiaoping, although the phrase was in fact coined by his successor, Jiang Zemin.

Construed literally, the first part of the slogan, "taoguang", refers to concealing one's fame or talent, while "yanghui" means to retreat from public life. The combined term, "taohui" is also used to describe a tactic of hiding one's abilities, biding time, and waiting for the right moment.

== Usage ==
The term "Taoguang Yanghui" (韬光养晦) is not a commonly used phrase in Chinese, and prior to being used in the context of China's foreign policy, it was unfamiliar to many people. Some dictionaries define "taoguang" as concealing one's fame or talent, while "yanghui" originally means to retreat from public life. The combined term, "taohui," has been recorded, being generally used to describe a tactic of hiding one's abilities, biding time, and waiting for the right moment.

The phrase is commonly attributed to a speech by Deng Xiaoping, although there is no evidence that Deng actually said these words. The first time Deng used a phrase similar to this was during his 1992 Southern Tour, where he stated, "If we work hard without drawing attention for a few years, we will be able to have more influence in the international community. Only then can we become a great power in the global arena". The first person to use the phrase "hide your strength, bide your time" in its current form was actually Deng's successor, Jiang Zemin, who was then the General Secretary of the Chinese Communist Party.

== Background ==
In 1989, Deng Xiaoping promoted the reform and opening-up policy, prioritizing economic development and shifting away from the previous foreign policy that focused on promoting the international communist movement and class struggle. Deng emphasised peaceful international relations as a fundamental principle of China's foreign policy. At the same time, Deng took a hard-line stance on issues such as the return of Hong Kong, Chinese unification, and the ethnic movements of the Tibetan people and Uyghur people, which he viewed as an issue of domestic national sovereignty.

Deng's two-pronged approach enhanced economic development in China. By mid-1989, China had established generally favorable relations with the Soviet Union and India, allowing for international trade. However, the Tiananmen Square protests and massacre in June of that year led to increasing distrust of China in the international community and sanctions imposed by Western countries. At the same time, the decline of communism in the Soviet Union and Eastern Europe had rapidly accelerated, increasing China's diplomatic and ideological isolation. By 1991, the Soviet Union had dissolved, and the Communist Party of the Soviet Union disbanded. The United States adopted a tough stance toward China on issues such as human rights, arms exports, trade, and relations with Taiwan, causing significant difficulties for Deng's conciliatory diplomacy. Faced with these internal and external crises, Deng was met with increasing opposition within China. Within the core of the Chinese Communist Party, the Politburo Standing Committee expressed serious doubts about the direction of market reforms.

== Foreign policy strategy ==
=== Deng Xiaoping ===
Following Tiananmen, Deng, speaking on how to handle the ongoing sanctions from the West and possible future attacks, frequently used the phrases: "冷静観察、穏住陣脚、沈着応付" ("observe calmly, secure our position, respond with composure") and "冷静観察、穏住陣脚、沈着応付、有所作為" ("observe calmly, secure our position, respond with composure, and do what needs to be done"). Despite political pressure from the United States, Deng maintained the stance that China and the U.S. should "enhance mutual trust, reduce troubles, develop cooperation, and avoid confrontation". Takahara and Maeda identify this conciliatory policy as the "hide your strength, bide your time" strategy.

=== Jiang Zemin, Hu Jintao ===
In the People's Republic of China, a diplomatic conference is held every five years, during which the fundamental guidelines for foreign policy are presented. At the 9th Diplomatic Envoy Conference held in 1999, Jiang Zemin set forth the basic principles of Chinese diplomacy as "冷静観察、穏住陣脚、沈着応対、韜光養晦、有所作為" ("observe calmly, secure our position, respond with composure, hide your strength and bide time, and do what needs to be done). Internationally, "hide your strength, bide your time" was sometimes perceived as a blueprint for China to quietly build up its national power. However, Deng Xiaoping and Jiang Zemin were, in fact, advocating a grand strategy of not standing out in the international community.

In the mid-2000s, under Jiang Zemin, there was a resurgence of assertive diplomacy through the "Peaceful Rise" doctrine, which advocated for foreign policy whose proactiveness was commensurate with China's status as a major power. However, this trend was reversed under the Hu Jintao administration in the late 2000s, with a renewed emphasis on peaceful development and cooperative diplomacy, referred to as the "Harmonious Diplomacy" line. These fluctuations aligned with China's transformation into a global trading power and were further bolstered by the bureaucratic interests of the People's Liberation Army, leading to the modernization of naval power and the globalization of military diplomacy. This development, particularly in relation to foreign affairs and especially Sino-Japanese relations, has correlated with the rise of xenophobic nationalism, often triggered by external crises.

During the subsequent administration of Hu Jintao, China's diplomacy began to change. At the beginning of his tenure as General Secretary of the Chinese Communist Party, Hu promoted a cooperative foreign policy. At the 10th Diplomatic Envoy Conference in 2004, he called for the establishment of the "Four Environments": an international environment of peace and stability, a surrounding environment of good neighborliness and friendship, an environment of cooperative equality and mutual benefit, and an environment of friendly public opinion. However, as China's rise to great power status continued, Hu found it increasingly difficult to resist the growing voices advocating for a more assertive foreign policy. By the 11th Diplomatic Envoy Conference in 2009, Hu was calling for strengthening "the four forces": political influence, economic competitiveness, a friendly image, and moral suasion. Moreover, Hu modified the previously restrained diplomatic approach of "韜光養晦、有所作為 " (conceal capabilities and bide time, and do what needs to be done) to "坚持韜光養晦、積極有所作為" (continue to conceal capabilities and bide time, but take a more proactive stance and do more).

==== Decline ====
Among Japanese researchers, several factors are cited as contributing to the perceived wavering of or changes to the "hide your strength, bide your time" policy. Shindou's later work emphasizes the dynamics between Deng Xiaoping's "hide your strength, bide your time" strategy and the bureaucratic political model of China, observing that, after the end of the Cold War, a latent conflict emerged within China's policy-making community between proponents of naval expansion and those favoring a more limited naval approach.

Shimizu's subsequent article sees the hardline stance being led by the PLA. He notes the example of the March 2010 sinking of a South Korean navy corvette, attributed to a North Korean torpedo attack. When the United States and South Korea planned joint military exercises in the Yellow Sea near the incident, the Chinese military obstructed their efforts. At that time, Chinese military personnel frequently appeared in domestic media ahead of any government statements, arguing that military exercises involving U.S. aircraft carriers at China's doorstep should be opposed, a view popular domestically. Senior officials in the Chinese Ministry of Foreign Affairs expressed concerns that the military should not interfere in diplomacy, although voicing such opinions in public was politically and socially unacceptable.

Unlike Mao Zedong and Deng Xiaoping, Jiang Zemin and Hu Jintao lacked military backgrounds when they assumed the chairmanship of the Central Military Commission. Since the Chinese Communist Revolution, the Red Army had implemented a unique form of civilian control, in which both political commissars and commanders appointed by the Chinese Communist Party held shared command over the troops. After the founding of the People's Republic, however, the military became composed entirely of professional soldiers, who shared common interests in areas such as salaries and equipment.

Jiang Zemin and Hu Jintao worked hard to maintain their positions as top leaders by accommodating the military's demands, such as increasing the defense budget by more than 10 percent annually for over 20 years and promoting generals at an accelerated rate. The leadership's failure to enforce strict civilian control, while simultaneously appeasing nationalist sentiments among the public, encouraged China's hardline foreign policy stance.

=== Xi Jinping ===
Hu Jintao's successor, Xi Jinping, was the only member of the 17th Politburo Standing Committee with experience as a defense bureaucrat. From the outset, Xi appealed to nationalism by promoting the concept of the "great rejuvenation of the Chinese nation", embedding the principle of a "strong military" into the Communist Party's constitution, and investing in military expansion, making China the world's second-largest military spender after the U.S. Xi also chaired the Central Military-Civil Fusion Development Committee, which he established as a strategy for national prosperity and military strength, modeled on the U.S. military-industrial complex, aimed at enhancing China's defense industry. This has led to assessments that Xi overturned the "hide your strength, bide your time" policy.

== Contemporary debate ==
Chinese domestic researchers and government officials have mixed views on "how to specifically avoid standing out and what exactly China should do" on the international stage. Professor Jin Canrong of Renmin University of China notes, "At the strategic level, everyone agrees that we should continue to follow the idea of 'hide your strength, bide your time,' but at the tactical level, opinions vary. Some say China is too passive, while others argue that China should take a more proactive approach". Some Chinese scholars criticize Deng's maxim as outdated and unsuited to China's new international standing, advocating for China to act more assertively and protect its national interests. Professor Yan Xuetong of Tsinghua University, asserts that "China should not continue to hide its capabilities but instead pursue a more proactive diplomacy as a great, responsible power. The 'hide your strength' policy was appropriate for China's international standing and environment in the early 1990s, but now China's international status has fundamentally changed. The 'hide your strength' policy will only harm China now". A minority of scholars argue that China should adopt a passive approach to avoid getting entangled in international affairs.

Nonetheless, popular opinion in China still favours the argument that given China's stage of development and limited power, Deng's maxim remains an appropriate guideline for China's diplomacy. At the annual meeting of the China International Relations Association held in Lanzhou in 2010, participants from across mainland China debated whether the paradigm was still effective. They ultimately concluded that it remained suitable as a guiding principle for Chinese diplomacy. Based on this broad consensus, the participants proposed nine key policy recommendations:

1. Do not confront the United States.
2. Do not challenge the international system as a whole.
3. Do not let ideology dictate foreign policy.
4. Do not become the leader of an "anti-Western bloc."
5. Do not oppose the majority of countries, even if we are in the right.
6. Learn to compromise, concede, and negotiate mutual benefits.
7. Do not compromise on China's core interests concerning national unity.
8. Provide public goods where needed in the international community.
9. Use major international events to improve China's global image.

By 2015, some began to see China's foreign policy as having undergone a significant shift from "hide your strength, bide your time" to "奋发有为" (actively striving to achieve). Associate Professor Zhao Kejin of Tsinghua University stated, "China's foreign policy underwent a major transformation around 2008, marked by the 2008 Beijing Olympics and the Lehman Shock". He added, "China's stance on the Spratly Islands—'set aside disputes and pursue joint development'—remains unchanged. However, with the capacity to respond to unilateral development by countries like the Philippines and Vietnam, China's position has shifted to saying what needs to be said and doing what needs to be done. China's diplomacy has transformed to reflect its status as a major power that cannot be underestimated by its neighboring countries".

== See also ==
- Foreign policy of China
- Realpolitik
- Wolf warrior diplomacy
- Weltpolitik
