= Jing Quan =

Chinese diplomat (born 1975)

- 井泉
- Jing in 2026

Chinese Ambassador to the Philippines
- Incumbent
- Assumed office December 2025
- Appointed by: Xi Jinping
- Preceded by: Huang Xilian

Deputy Director-General of the Department of North American and Oceanian Affairs
- In office 2018–2021
- Director: Cong Peiwu; Lu Kang

Deputy Chief of Mission, Chinese Embassy in the United States
- In office 2021–2025
- Ambassador: Qin Gang; Xie Feng

Personal details
- Born: July 1975 (age 51) Hancheng, Shaanxi
- Party: Chinese Communist Party
- Education: Xian Foreign Studies University

Chinese name
- Simplified Chinese: 井泉
- Traditional Chinese: 井泉
Transcriptions
Standard Mandarin
- Hanyu Pinyin: Jǐng Quán
- Bopomofo: ㄐㄧㄥˇ ㄑㄩㄢˊ
- Wade–Giles: Ching3 Chʻüan2
- IPA: [tɕìŋ tɕʰwǎn]
Southern Min
- Hokkien POJ: Kéng Choân
- Tâi-lô: Kíng Tsuân

Jing Quan (Chinese: 井泉; pinyin: Jǐng Quán; Wade–Giles: Ching^{1} Chʻüan^{2}; born July 1975) is a Chinese senior diplomat serving as Chinese ambassador to the Philippines since December 2025. A US-China relations veteran who served China's Foreign Ministry and the Chinese embassy in the US during the first and second term of President Donald Trump, he replaced Huang Xilian amidst tensions over the South China Sea.

== Early life and education ==
Born in July 1975 at Hancheng, Shaanxi Province. He had his bachelor's degree in the English language from Xian Foreign Studies University and later obtained a master's degree in international relations.

== Career ==
Jing entered foreign service in 1997, serving as attaché at the Chinese embassy in Thailand. He also became counselor of the General Office of the State Council, becoming a close aide to State Councillor Yang Jieche in 2013.

=== United States ===
In the United States, Jing was a fellow at the Brookings Institution from 2004 to 2005. According to Brookings, he focused on issues like Taiwan and North Korea in US-China relations. In a discussion about US foreign policy in East Asia at the Center for Northeast Asian Policy Studies on June 22, 2005, Jing shared his views alongside participants from Japan, South Korea, Hong Kong, and Taiwan. He explained that American liberals are usually optimistic about international organizations, while American conservatives focus on power dynamics. Due to these differing views, the US foreign policy community often struggles to reach a consensus.

From 2018 to 2021, he served as deputy director-general of the Department of North American and Oceanian Affairs. From 2021, he was minister at the Chinese embassy in Washington DC and appointed as deputy chief of mission at the same embassy until 2025. In China, Jing's appointment as deputy chief of mission was seen by observers as hope for rebuilding worsening relations with the US.

Jing spent 23 years working on US affairs, experiencing US sanctions, expulsion of Chinese diplomats, and closures of Chinese consulates. He was one of the attendees of the November 2018 bilateral diplomatic and security dialogue, alongside Chinese minister of defence Wei Fenghe and US state secretary Mike Pompeo, and one of the trade negotiators during the first and second term of President Donald Trump. In July 2021, he was witness on a heated meeting between Foreign Vice Minister Xie Feng and US deputy secretary of state Wendy Sherman. In December 2021, he made his Washington debut as deputy chief of mission at a trade event marking the first batch of Kansas export of soybeans to China's Henan Province.

=== Philippines ===
China's friends can also be the US' friends. And the US' friends can also be China’s friends. This is not a zero-sum game. The Philippines does not need to choose sides, nor rely on one to counter the other. Like other ASEAN countries, it can maintain sound relations with both China and the United States...

— Jing Quan, Rappler (January 21, 2026)

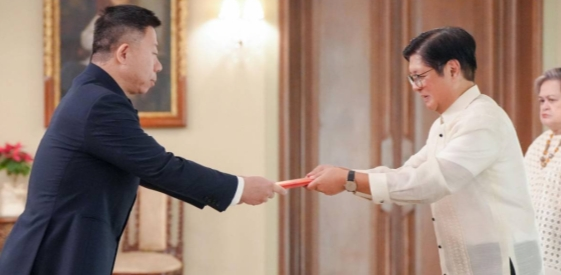
Philippine President Bongbong Marcos receives the credentials of Jing as Chinese ambassador, December 11, 2025

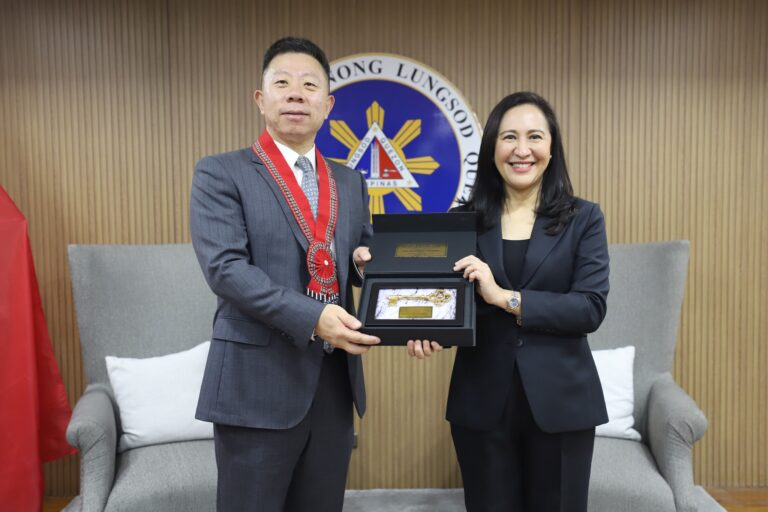
Jing with Quezon City Mayor Joy Belmonte on January 22, 2026

Jing with Davao City Mayor Sebastian Duterte on January 26, 2026

He arrived in the Philippines on December 6, 2025 and was eventually designated as the Chinese ambassador to the country. Being a US-China relations veteran, some analysts suspect that his appointment was due to the close relation of the Philippines with the United States. This is in contrast with his two previous predecessors, Huang Xilian and Zhao Jianhua, who had backgrounds in Asian affairs. As ambassador, he assured the Bongbong Marcos administration that China is dedicated to negotiating a South China Sea code of conduct with ASEAN.

==== Public criticism of Philippine officials ====
Under Jing, the Chinese embassy has been described as being "more strident, assertive, and provocative" in reiterating China's position in the South China Sea dispute compared to his predecessor, Huang Xilian. Since January 2026, the Chinese embassy had social media posts and public statements attacking Philippine senior officials, including Philippine Coast Guard's West Philippine Sea spokesman Jay Tarriela, Senator Risa Hontiveros, and Representative Leila de Lima. Responding to the social media posts, Senator Kiko Pangilinan challenged Jing to "speak up" instead of using lower-ranking officials for verbal attacks. De Lima called the accusations "wrongful and groundless."

As a result of the Chinese embassy's public criticisms, the municipal council of Kalayaan, Palawan declared Jing as persona non grata. Responding to this action by the municipality, China had reportedly banned 16 Kalayaan officials from entering mainland China, Hong Kong, and Macau on February 10, 2026. In a Chinese New Year reception that same day, Jing reiterated his position that China and the Philippines should "find ways" to manage differences. However, he also warned that Beijing will "firmly" oppose any "false narratives" and "misinformation" damaging China's reputation. The Malacañang Palace expressed non-interference with the Chinese government's decision on the travel ban.

==== Media ====
In January 2026, Jing met with executives from eight Mandarin news outlets in the Philippines, urging them to "cooperate closely" with the embassy. Jing also urged the Philippine media to "uphold objectivity and fairness, allow the public to hear authentic voices from all sides, not just one side."

== Diplomatic style ==
Huang Jing, a dean at Beijing Language and Culture University, described Jing as a "soft-spoken pragmatist" in comparison with a wolf warrior diplomat and had an "experienced American hand". William Yang, a senior analyst of Northeast Asia at the International Crisis Group, called him an experienced negotiator. According to Cito Beltran of The Philippine Star, Jing "could be mistaken more for a general than an ambassador," noting his appearance and body posture.

== Selected publications ==
- Quan, Jing (23 January 2026). "Cooperation beyond differences: On the threshold of the second 50 years of China-Philippines relations". The Philippine Star.
