= Hou Yanqi =

Chinese diplomat

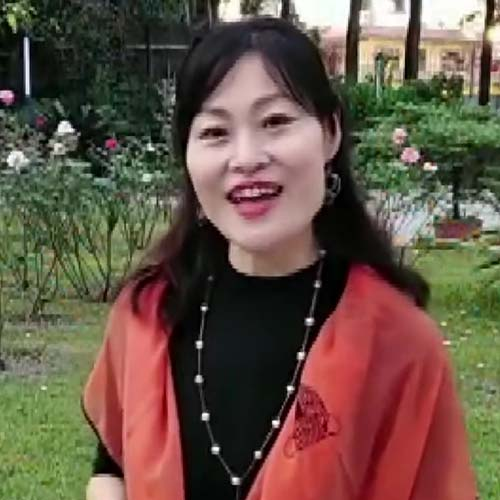

Director of the Foreign Ministry Boundary and Ocean Affairs Department of the People's Republic of China
- Incumbent
- Assumed office December 2025
- Preceded by: Hong Liang

Chinese Ambassador to ASEAN
- In office December 2022 – November 2025
- Preceded by: Deng Xijun
- Succeeded by: Wang Qing

Chinese Ambassador to Nepal
- In office December 2018 – October 2022
- Preceded by: Yu Hong
- Succeeded by: Chen Song

Personal details
- Born: March 1970 (age 56) Tianjin, China
- Party: Chinese Communist Party
- Education: Peking University
- Occupation: Diplomat

Hou Yanqi
- Traditional Chinese: 侯艷琪
- Simplified Chinese: 侯艳琪
Transcriptions
Standard Mandarin
- Hanyu Pinyin: Hóu Yànqí

Hou Yanqi (Chinese: 侯艳琪; March 1970) is a Chinese diplomat currently serving as Director-general of the Department of Boundary and Ocean Affairs of the Ministry of Foreign Affairs as of December 2025. From 2018 to 2022 she served as the Ambassador to Nepal and from 2022 to 2025 as Ambassador to ASEAN.

== Biography ==
Hou was born in Tianjin in 1970 with ancestral roots in Qingxu County, Taiyuan, Shanxi province, China.

== Career ==
Hou has served at the Ministry of Foreign Affairs since 1996, prior to being appointed ambassador, she was the deputy director general, focusing on South Asian affairs. She has also been stationed in Pakistan and as the consul of the Chinese Consulate-General in Los Angeles. From 2018 to 2022 she served as Ambassador to Nepal. On 22 December 2022 she was sworn in as Ambassador to ASEAN. In November 2025, she bid her farewell to the ASEAN Secretary General, effectively ending her role. In December 2025, she was appointed director of the Department of Boundary and Ocean Affairs of the Ministry of Foreign Affairs, succeeding Hong Liang.

She has been noted for her use of Twitter to increase the soft power of China.

== Personal life ==
Hou is married and has one son. She speaks Urdu, which she majored at Peking University.

== See also ==
- China-Nepal relations
