= Martina Wagner-Egelhaaf =

Professor of German Literature

Martina Wagner-Egelhaaf (born 1957) is a Senior Professor at the University of Münster, Germany. She was a Professor of German Literature at the University of Münster, and held a chair in German Literary History with special focus on Modernity and Contemporary Literature. Her fields of research include Autobiography/Autofiction, Literary Theory, Rhetoric, Literary and Cultural Studies, Gender Studies, and the relation of Religion, Politics and Literature.

== Education and career ==
From 1976 to 1987 Martina Wagner-Egelhaaf studied German Studies and History at the University of Tübingen, where she earned her doctorate with a dissertation on Mysticism and Modernity (title: Mystik der Moderne). From 1987 to 1994, she was a postdoctoral researcher in the Department of Literary Studies at the University of Konstanz. As a member of the team of Professor v. Graevenitz, she completed her habilitation in 1994 with a study on the Melancholy of Literature (title: Die Melancholie der Literatur).

From 1995 until 1998 she was Professor for New German Studies, especially for the Theory of Literature and Rhetoric, at Ruhr University Bochum. Since 1998 she has been Professor of Modern German Literature at the University of Münster. She held visiting professorships at the University of Washington in Seattle, the University of Kansas in Lawrence, the Xi'an International Studies University in Xi'an, and the National Mirzo-Ulugbek University in Tashkent.

At Münster, Wagner-Egelhaaf is Principal Investigator in the Cluster of Excellence Religion and Politics, Dynamics of Tradition and Innovation and conducted a subproject in the CRC 1385 Law and Literature. From 2004 until 2010 she was a Senator for the German Research Foundation (Deutsche Forschungsgemeinschaft, DFG) and from 2010 until 2019 she served as a Member of the Selection Committee for the Allocation of Humboldt Research Fellowships of the Alexander von Humboldt Foundation. From 2020 to 2024 she was Member of the DFG-Review Board 105, Literary Studies. In 2014 she was elected an Ordinary Member of the North Rhine-Westphalian Academy of Sciences, Humanities and the Arts (Nordrhein-Westfälische Akademie der Wissenschaften). Since 2018 she has been a Member of the University Council of Münster, and also since 2010 has been a Member of the International Board of the International Association for Germanic Studies (Internationale Vereinigung für Germanistik, IVG).

== Selected publications ==
=== Author ===
- Sich entscheiden. Momente der Autobiographie bei Goethe. Göttingen: Wallstein 2020, ISBN 978-3-8353-3813-5.
- with Jürgen Petersen: Einführung in die neuere deutsche Literaturwissenschaft. Ein Arbeitsbuch. 8th ed. Berlin: Erich Schmidt 2009, ISBN 978-3-503-09880-4.
- with Hendrik Blumentrath, Julia Bodenburg, Roger Hillmann: Transkulturalität. Türkisch-deutsche Konstellationen in Literatur und Film, Literaturwissenschaft Theorie & Beispiele. Münster: Aschendorff 2007, ISBN 978-3-402-04180-2.
- Autobiographie. 2nd ed., Stuttgart/Weimar: Metzler 2005, ISBN 978-3-476-12323-7.
- Die Melancholie der Literatur. Diskursgeschichte und Textfiguration. Stuttgart/Weimar: Metzler 1997, ISBN 978-3-476-01533-4.
- Mystik der Moderne. Die visionäre Ästhetik der deutschen Literatur im 20. Jahrhundert. Stuttgart/Weimar: Metzler 1989, ISBN 3-476-00665-4.

=== Editor and co-editor ===
- Handbook of Autobiography/Autofiction, 3 vols., vol. 1: Theory and Concepts, vol. 2: History, vol. 3: Exemplary Texts. Berlin/Boston: de Gruyter 2019, ISBN 978-3-11-027971-9.
- with Carla Dauven-van Knippenberg, Christian Moser, Rolf Parr: Text – Körper – Textkörper. Heidelberg: Synchron 2019, ISBN 978-3-947960-03-3.
- with Bruno Quast, Helene Basu: Mythen und Narrative des Entscheidens. Göttingen: Vandenhoeck & Ruprecht 2019, ISBN 978-3-525-36092-7.
- with Sonja Arnold u.a.: Sich selbst erzählen. Autobiographie – Autofiktion – Autorschaft. Kiel: Ludwig 2018, ISBN 978-3-86935-321-0.
- with Wolfram Drews, Ulrich Pfister: Religion und Entscheiden. Historische und Kulturwissenschaftliche Perspektiven. Würzburg: Ergon 2018, ISBN 978-3-95650-390-0.
- Stimmen aus dem Jenseits/Voices from Beyond. Ein interdisziplinäres Projekt/An Interdisciplinary Project. Würzburg: Ergon 2017.
- with Florian Kläger: Europa gibt es doch… Krisendiskurse im Blick der Literatur. München: Fink 2016, ISBN 978-3-7705-5925-1.
- with Christel Meier: Prophetie und Autorschaft. Charisma, Heilsversprechen und Gefährdung, Berlin: Akademie-Verl., 2014.
- with Christian Sieg: Autorschaften im Spannungsfeld von Religion und Politik. Würzburg: Ergon 2014, ISBN 978-3-95650-029-9.
- with Sigrid G. Köhler, Hania Siebenpfeiffer: Materie. Grundlagentexte zur Theoriegeschichte. Berlin: Suhrkamp 2013, ISBN 978-3-518-29651-6.
- Auto(r)fiktion. Literarische Verfahren der Selbstkonstruktion. Bielefeld: Aisthesis 2013, ISBN 978-3-89528-970-5.
- with Katharina Grabbe, Sigrid G. Köhler: Das Imaginäre der Nation. Zur Persistenz einer politischen Kategorie in Literatur und Film. Bielefeld: transcript 2012, ISBN 978-3-8376-1981-2.
- with Franciszek Grucza, Claudia Liebrand, Hans-Gert Roloff: Autofiktion. Neue Verfahren literarischer Selbstdarstellung. Frankfurt a. M.: Lang 2012, ISBN 978-3-653-02784-6.
- with Christel Meier: Autorschaft: Ikonen – Stile – Institutionen. Berlin: Akademie-Verl. 2011, ISBN 978-3-05-005108-6.
- with Lily Tonger-Erk: Einspruch! Reden von Frauen. Stuttgart/Leipzig: Reclam 2011, ISBN 978-3-15-020218-0.
- with Doerte Bischoff: Rhetorik und Gender (= Rhetorik. Ein Internationales Jahrbuch. Vol. 29). Berlin/Boston: de Gruyter 2010, ISBN 978-3-11-022325-5.
- Hermanns Schlachten. Zur Literaturgeschichte eines nationalen Mythos. Bielefeld: Aisthesis 2008, ISBN 978-3-89528-714-5.
- with Doerte Bischoff: Mitsprache, Rederecht, Stimmgewalt. Genderkritische Strategien und Transformationen der Rhetorik. Heidelberg: Winter 2006, ISBN 978-3-8253-5081-9.
- with Moritz Baßler, Bettina Gruber: Gespenster. Erscheinungen – Medien – Theorien. Würzburg: Königshausen & Neumann 2005, ISBN 3-8260-2608-X.
- with Sigrid G. Köhler, Jan Christian Metzler: Prima materia. Beiträge zur transdisziplinären Materialitätsdebatte. Königstein/Ts.: Helmer 2004, ISBN 3-89741-144-X.
- with Doerte Bischoff: Weibliche Rede – Rhetorik der Weiblichkeit. Studien zum Verhältnis von Rhetorik und Geschlechterdifferenz. Freiburg i. Br.: Rombach 2003, ISBN 978-3-7930-9321-3.
- Region – Literatur – Kultur. Regionalliteraturforschung heute. Bielefeld: Aisthesis 2001, ISBN 3-89528-291-X.
- Karl Philipp Moritz, Andreas Hartknopf. Eine Allegorie. Andreas Hartknopfs Predigerjahre. bibliographisch ergänzte Ausgabe. Stuttgart: Reclam 2001, ISBN 3-15-018120-8.
