= Almighty Opp =

Musical puppet show in Los Angeles

Almighty Opp is a guerrilla-style musical puppet show based in Koreatown, Los Angeles. It typically takes place on the sidewalk corner of Western & Elmwood Avenues. It was created by the anonymous artist known as Jeffrey's Human Persona. In December 2025, after a nearly five-year hiatus, the show returned to its Koreatown corner. In early 2026, the show introduced "Secret Somewhere Services," ticketed, private pop-up events at rotating locations.
