= Los Angeles High School of the Arts =

Specialty school in Los Angeles, California

Los Angeles High School of the Arts (often referred to as LAHSA) is a public high school located at the Robert F. Kennedy Community Schools campus, on Wilshire Boulevard in the Koreatown district of Central Los Angeles, California. This high school is within the Los Angeles Unified School District (LAUSD)

It was formerly known as the BAPA (Belmont Academy of Performing Arts), small learning community established in 1998 by the LAUSD. As was, LAHSA continues BAPA's mission, preparing its students for enrollment and success in four-year university programs, with an emphasis placed on the performing arts: drama, singing, and dancing.

Students take classes in set design, sound production, and lighting design. They are also experience other aspects of theater production, by writing, casting, and directing their own plays.

== Academics ==
Advanced Placement

• AP Spanish Language

• AP World History: Modern

• AP Biology

• AP English Language and Composition

• AP English Literature and Composition

• AP Precalculus

• AP Calculus AB

• AP Calculus BC

• AP Computer Science

• AP US History

• AP US Government

STEAM

• Chemistry

• Environmental Science

• Physiology

• Computer Science

• Acting

• Design

• Geometry

• Algebra 1

• Algebra 2

• Statistics

== Current Administration ==
Cathy Kwan (principal)

== See also ==
- Robert F. Kennedy Community Schools
- California Institute of the Arts
