= List of ambassadors of China to ASEAN =

Ambassador of China to the Association of Southeast Asian Nations
- 中国驻东盟使团大使列表
- National emblem of China

- Flag of China
- Incumbent; Wang Qing since January 2026
- Ministry of Foreign Affairs
- Appointer: The president pursuant to a decision of the National People's Congress Standing Committee

List of ambassadors of China to ASEAN
- Traditional Chinese: 中華人民共和國駐東南亞國家聯盟大使
- Simplified Chinese: 中华人民共和国驻东南亚国家联盟大使
Transcriptions
Standard Mandarin
- Hanyu Pinyin: Zhōnghuá Rénmín Gònghéguó Zhù Dōngnányà Guójiā Liánméng Dàshǐ

The Chinese ambassador to the Association of Southeast Asian Nations (Chinese: 中华人民共和国驻东南亚国家联盟大使; pinyin: Zhōnghuá Rénmín Gònghéguó Zhù Dōngnányà Guójiā Liánméng Dàshǐ) is the official representative of the government in Beijing to the Association of Southeast Asian Nations.

== List of representatives ==
Diplomatic agrément/Diplomatic accreditation	Ambassador	Chinese language zh:中国驻东盟使团大使列表	Premier of the People's Republic of China	Secretary General of the Association of Southeast Asian Nations	Term end
December 2008	Xue Hanqin	zh:薛捍勤	Wen Jiabao	Surin Pitsuwan	February 1, 2008
March 1, 2008	Tong Xiaoling	zh:佟晓玲	Wen Jiabao	Surin Pitsuwan	July 2012
August 6, 2012	Yang Xiuping	zh:杨秀萍	Wen Jiabao	Surin Pitsuwan→Lê Lương Minh	May 2015
June 18, 2015	Xu Bu	zh:徐步	Li Keqiang	Lê Lương Minh	December 2017
January 29, 2018	Huang Xilian	zh:黄溪连	Li Keqiang	Lim Jock Hoi	November 2019
2020	Deng Xijun	zh:邓锡军	Li Keqiang	Lim Jock Hoi	2022
December 2022	Hou Yanqi	zh:侯艳琪	Li Keqiang → Li Qiang	Kao Kim Hourn	November 2025
January 2026	Wang Qing		Li Qiang	Kao Kim Hourn	

== See also ==
- China–Association of Southeast Asian Nations relations
