= Chen Song =

Chinese diplomat

- 陈松

Chinese Ambassador to Nepal
- Incumbent
- Assumed office January 2023
- Preceded by: Hou Yanqi

Personal details
- Born: 1972 (age 53–54)

Chen Song (Chinese: 陈松) (born 1972) is a Chinese diplomat who has been Ambassador to Nepal since January 2023.

== Career ==
Chen Song served as Minister Counsellor of the Permanent Mission to the United Nations. In 2020, he served as Deputy Director-General of the Asian Department of the Ministry of Foreign Affairs. In January 2023, he was appointed as the Ambassador of the People's Republic of China to Nepal.

After the 2023 Nepal earthquake Chen said that China would send tents and blankets from the China South Asian Countries Emergency Supplies Reserve and other relief materials worth Rs100 million to Nepal.
