= Du Ruiqing =

Chinese translator (1943–2019)

- Born: December 1943; Fufeng County, Shaanxi, Republic of China
- Died: 20 November 2019 (aged 75); Xi'an, Shaanxi
- Education: Xi'an Foreign Languages Institute; MA University of Sydney; Ph.D. Brigham Young University
- Occupation: Academic
- Political party: Chinese Communist Party

Du Ruiqing
- Chinese: 杜瑞清
Transcriptions
Standard Mandarin
- Hanyu Pinyin: Dù Ruìqīng
- IPA: [tû ɻwêɪ.tɕʰíŋ]

Du Ruiqing (Chinese: 杜瑞清; December 1943 – 20 November 2019) was a Chinese translator, educator, and academic administrator. He was a founder of Australian studies in China. He served as president of Xi'an Foreign Languages Institute from 1998 to 2005. He edited the New Century Chinese-English Dictionary (Chinese: 新世纪汉英大辞典), and was conferred the 4th Lifetime Achievement Award by the China Dictionary Society.

== Background ==
Du was born in December 1943 in Fufeng County, Shaanxi, Republic of China. He graduated from the Department of English of Xi'an Foreign Languages Institute (now Xi'an International Studies University) in September 1967, and later became a faculty member of the institute. He joined the Chinese Communist Party in 1972.

After the end of the Cultural Revolution, Du was one of the first nine people sent by the Chinese government to study in Australia in 1979. He earned a master's degree in English literature from the University of Sydney in 1981. He subsequently studied at Brigham Young University in the United States, where he obtained his Ph.D.

After returning to China, he continued to teach at Xi'an Foreign Languages Institute and was promoted to professor in 1991. In 1992, he was awarded a special pension for distinguished scholars by the State Council of China. He later served as Chair of the Department of English, Vice President (June 1995 to July 1998), and President (July 1998 to March 2005) of Xi'an Foreign Languages Institute. He retired in April 2005.

Du died on 20 November 2019 in Xi'an, aged 75.

== Contributions ==
Du was a founder of Australian studies in China. In the early 1980s, he was one of the first to teach Australian literature in China. Under his leadership, Xi'an Foreign Languages Institute established its Australian Studies Centre in 2000, one of the first such centers in China.

He wrote or edited many English textbooks, anthologies of English and Western literature, and reference books, including the New Century Chinese-English Dictionary (新世纪汉英大辞典). He authored the book Chinese Higher Education: A Decade of Reform and Development in English and published more than 50 research papers. In September 2018, the China Dictionary Society conferred him its 4th Lifetime Achievement Award.
