= Huang Xilian =

Chinese diplomat

- 黄溪连
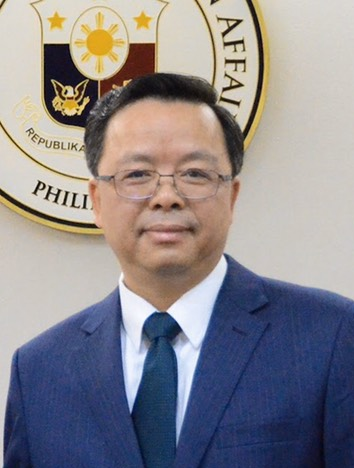
- Huang in 2019

Chinese Ambassador to the Philippines
- In office December 2019 – September 2025
- Appointed by: Xi Jinping
- Preceded by: Zhao Jianhua
- Succeeded by: Jing Quan

Chinese Ambassador to the Association of Southeast Asian Nations
- In office January 2018 – November 2019
- Appointed by: Xi Jinping
- Preceded by: Xu Bu
- Succeeded by: Deng Xijun

Personal details
- Born: September 1967 (age 59) China
- Party: Chinese Communist Party
- Education: Beijing Foreign Studies University; University of Manchester

Chinese name
- Simplified Chinese: 黄溪连
- Traditional Chinese: 黃溪連
Transcriptions
Standard Mandarin
- Hanyu Pinyin: Huáng Xīlián
- Bopomofo: ㄏㄨㄤˊ ㄒㄧ ㄌㄧㄢˊ
- Wade–Giles: Huang2 Hsi1-lien2
- IPA: [xwǎŋ ɕíljɛ̌n]
Southern Min
- Hokkien POJ: N̂g Khe-lîan
- Tâi-lô: N̂g Khe-liân

Huang Xilian (Chinese: 黄溪连; pinyin: Huáng Xīlián; Wade–Giles: Huang^{2} Hsi^{1}-lien^{2}; born September 1967) is a Chinese diplomat who served as Chinese Ambassador to the Philippines from December 2019 to September 2025.

== Biography ==
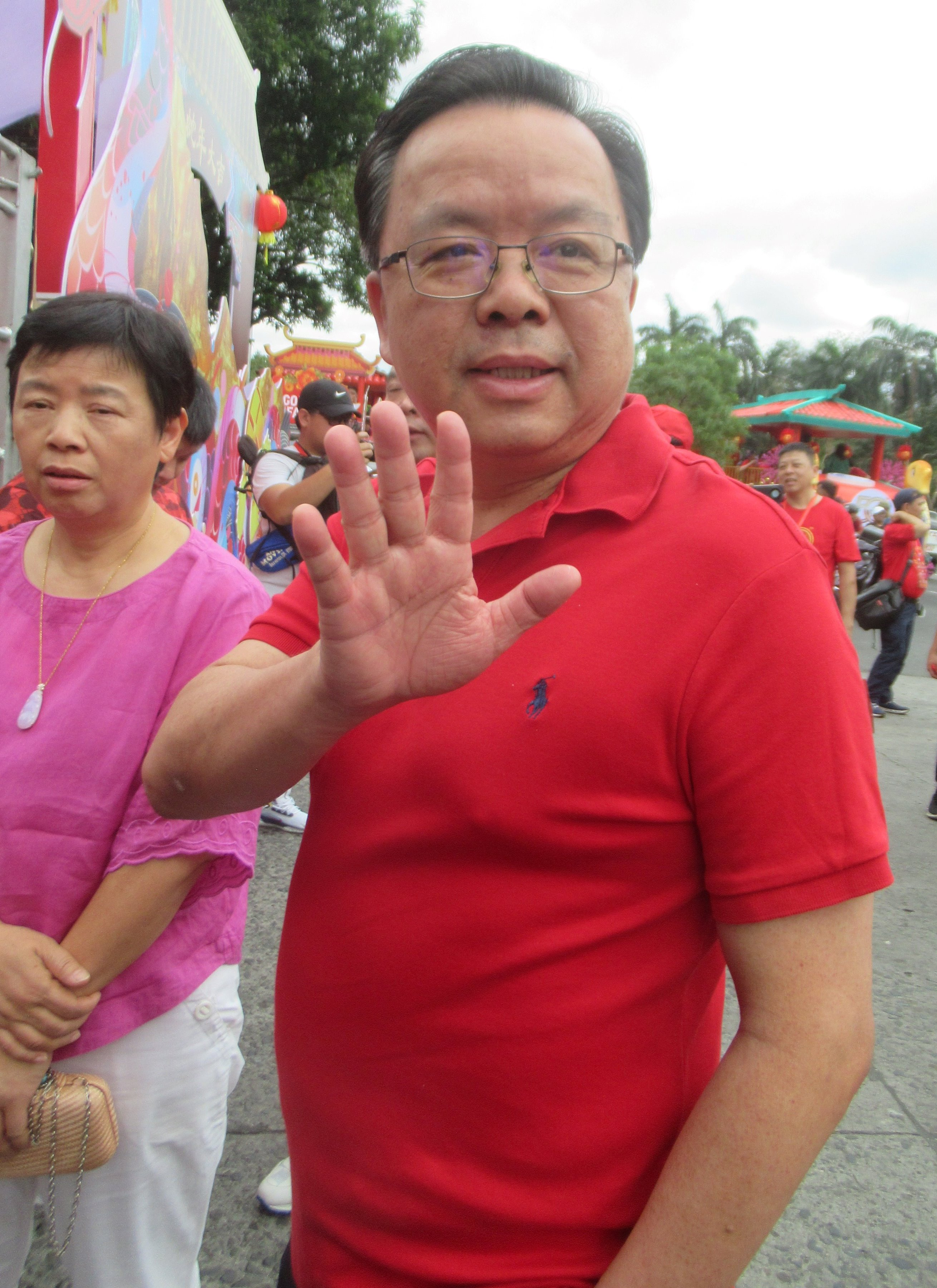
Huang waving in Manila during Chinese New Year 2025

Born in September 1967, Huang graduated from Beijing Foreign Studies University and the University of Manchester. He joined the foreign service in 1989 and has served primarily in South Asia and the Department of Asian Affairs, where he was promoted to deputy head in 2014.

He was designated by the Standing Committee of the National People's Congress in January 2018 to replace Xu Bu as Chinese Ambassador to the Association of Southeast Asian Nations. In December 2019, he was appointed Chinese Ambassador to the Philippines, pursuant to the National People's Congress decision, succeeding Deng Xijun. He wrote the lyrics for the controversial 2020 music video "Iisang Dagat".

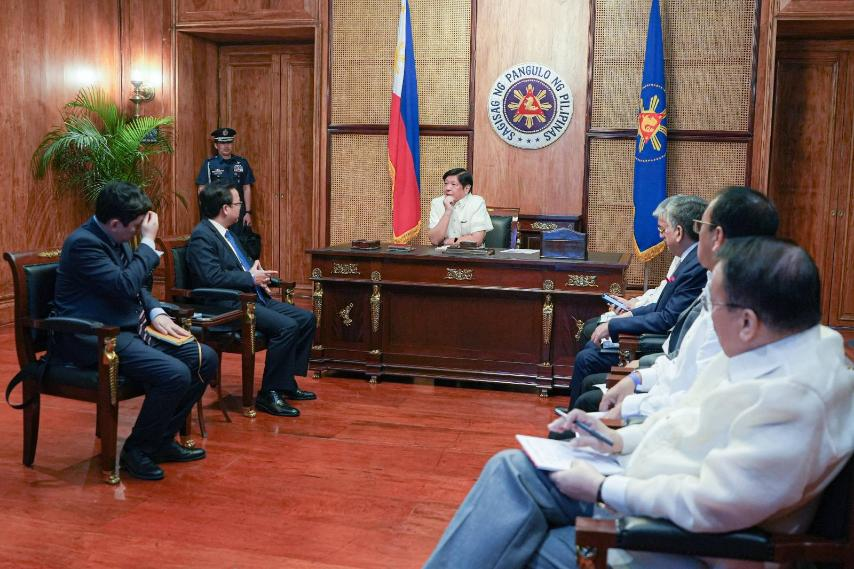
Huang being summoned by Philippine President Bongbong Marcos over issues within the South China Sea, February 2023

On August 16, 2023, the municipal council of Kalayaan, Palawan declared Huang as a persona non grata after he defended the harassment of China Coast Guard against Philippine vessels that occurred during the August 2023 Second Thomas Shoal standoff. That year, he was summoned multiple times by the Philippine government due to a series of confrontations between the Philippines and China in the South China Sea.

In July 2025, the Philippine government summoned him over the Chinese sanction against former senator Francis Tolentino. According to the Chinese embassy, Huang told the Philippine Department of Foreign Affairs that "anti-China" Filipino politicians had done "malicious deeds" on China-related issues for political self-interest. In September 2025, he bid his farewell to the Malacañang Palace, effectively ending his role as Chinese ambassador. In December 2025, he was succeeded by Jing Quan.

== Diplomatic style ==
As Chinese ambassador to the Philippines, Cristina Chi of The Philippine Star described Huang as having a "measured tone" during the later years of the pro-China Duterte administration and first half of the Bongbong Marcos administration.

Diplomatic posts
Preceded by Xu Bu	Chinese Ambassador to the Association of Southeast Asian Nations; 2018–2019	Succeeded by Deng Xijun
Preceded by Zhao Jianhua	Chinese Ambassador to the Philippines; 2019–2025	Succeeded by Jing Quan
