= Deng Xijun =

Chinese diplomat

- 邓锡军

Special Envoy for Asian Affairs of the Ministry of Foreign Affairs of China
- Incumbent
- Assumed office December 2022
- Preceded by: Sun Guoxiang

Ambassador of China to ASEAN
- In office 2020–2022
- Preceded by: Huang Xilian
- Succeeded by: Hou Yanqi

Ambassador of China to Afghanistan
- In office 2013–2015
- Preceded by: Xu Feihong
- Succeeded by: Yao Jing

Personal details
- Born: 1962 (age 63–64) China
- Education: Fudan University; China Foreign Affairs University
- Occupation: Diplomat
- Awards: Sayyid Jamal al-Din al-Afghani Medal (Afghanistan)

Deng Xijun (Chinese: 邓锡军; pinyin: Dèng Xījūn; born June 1962) is a Chinese diplomat, serving as the Special Envoy for Asian Affairs of the Ministry of Foreign Affairs of China. Previously he served as Ambassador of China to Afghanistan between 2013 and 2015 and Ambassador of China to ASEAN between 2020 and 2022.

== Biography ==
Deng graduated from the Department of Foreign Languages of Fudan University. In 1983, he entered the China Foreign Affairs University to study diplomacy. In October 1985, Deng began his diplomatic career as staff member and then attaché at the embassy of China in Myanmar. In 1988, he served as attaché in the Department of Asian Affairs of the Ministry of Foreign Affairs, later becoming third secretary. In 1992, he was assigned to the embassy of China in the Philippines as third secretary and later second secretary.

In 1995, he became second secretary in the Department of Asian Affairs, subsequently being promoted to deputy division director. In 1997, he transferred to the embassy of China in Malaysia as second and then first secretary. In 1999, he became first secretary at the embassy of China in Singapore. In 2001, he was first secretary at the Department for Party-Related Affairs of the Ministry of Foreign Affairs.

In 2002, he served as political counselor at the Embassy of China in Afghanistan. In 2004, Deng studied at the Hoover Institution of Stanford University. In 2005, he became counselor at the Department of Asian Affairs, and in 2006, political counselor at the embassy of China in the Philippines.

In 2009, he was appointed deputy director of the Foreign Affairs Office of Chengdu, the capital of Sichuan Province. In 2011, he served as minister-counselor at the embassy of China in India.

In September 2013, Deng was appointed Ambassador of China to Afghanistan.

In early October 2015, Deng stepped down as Ambassador to Afghanistan and returned to China. Earlier, in September 2015, he was appointed Special Envoy for Afghan Affairs of the Ministry of Foreign Affairs of China.

In January 2020, Deng was appointed Ambassador of China to ASEAN. He left the post in November 2022. In December 2022, he was appointed Special Envoy for Asian Affairs of the Ministry of Foreign Affairs of China.

On February 2023, he meet with the Myanmar ethnic armed organization representatives including UWSA, AA and KIA, in Shan State.

== Honours ==
=== Foreign orders and decorations ===
- Sayyid Jamal al-Din al-Afghani Medal (Afghanistan, presented at the Presidential Palace in Kabul on 3 October 2015)

== Personal life ==
Deng is married and has one son.

Diplomatic posts
Preceded by Sun Guoxiang	Special Envoy for Asian Affairs of the Ministry of Foreign Affairs of China; 2022–present	
Preceded by Huang Xilian	Ambassador of China to ASEAN; 2020–2022	Succeeded by Hou Yanqi
Preceded by Sun Yuxi	Special Envoy for Afghan Affairs of the Ministry of Foreign Affairs of China; 2015–2020	Succeeded by Liu Jian
Preceded by Xu Feihong	Ambassador of China to Afghanistan; 2013–2015	Succeeded by Yao Jing
