= List of ambassadors of China to Nepal =

Coordinates: 27.712738°N 85.322630°E

Chinese Ambassador to Nepal
- Incumbent; Chen Song since January 2023
- Inaugural holder: Yuan Zhongxian
- Formation: 3 August 1955; 71 years ago

The Chinese ambassador to Nepal is the official representative of the People's Republic of China to the Federal Democratic Republic of Nepal.

== List of representatives ==
Diplomatic agrément/Diplomatic accreditation	Ambassador	Chinese language zh:中国驻尼泊尔大使列表	Observations	Premier of the People's Republic of China	List of prime ministers of Nepal	Term end
August 1, 1955			The governments in Kathmandu and Beijing established diplomatic relations.	Zhou Enlai	Mahendra of Nepal'	February 1956
August 3, 1955	Yuan Zhongxian	zh:袁仲贤	concurrently accredited with residence in New Delhi. (1904 – 1957)	Zhou Enlai	Mahendra of Nepal'	February 1956
April 1956	Pan Zili	zh:潘自力	concurrently accredited with residence in New Delhi.	Zhou Enlai	Tanka Prasad Acharya	August 1960
August 1960	Zhang Shijie (PRC diplomat)	zh:张世杰 (外交官)	From August 1960 to November 1965 he was ambassador in Kathmandu (Nepal); From March 1975 to April 1979 he was ambassador in Somalia.	Zhou Enlai	Tulsi Giri	November 1965
March 1966	Yang Gongsu	zh:杨公素	(January 18, 2010 - March 8, 2015): From March 1966 to July 1967 he was ambassador in Kathmandu (Nepal).; From December 1978 to May 1980 he was ambassador in Hanoi (Vietnam).; From September 1980 to August 1982 he was ambassador in Athen (Greece).	Zhou Enlai	Surya Bahadur Thapa	July 1967
July 1969	Wang Ze	zh:王泽	(* 1918): From July 1969 to August 1972 he was ambassador in Kathmandu (Nepal).; From September 1972 to January 1977 he was ambassador in Mauritius.; From May 1977 to May 1981 Ambassador in Lima (Peru).; From July 1981 to April 1983 he was ambassador in Mexico.; From February 1983 to September 1984 he was ambassador in Sweden head of the Kinas ambassad i Stockholm.	Zhou Enlai	Kirti Nidhi Bista	August 1972
September 1972	Cao Chi	zh:曹痴	From March 1955 to March 1, 1960 he was Mayor of Changsha.; From April 1966 to February 1967 he was ambassador in Bagdhad (Iraq).; From September 1972 to November 1977 he was ambassador in Kathmandu (Nepal).; From March 1978 to July 1982 he was ambassador in Nikosia Cyprus.	Zhou Enlai	Kirti Nidhi Bista	November 1977
January 1978	Peng Guangwei	zh:彭光伟		Hua Guofeng	Kirti Nidhi Bista	April 1981
May 1981	Ma Muming	zh:马牧鸣		Zhao Ziyang	Surya Bahadur Thapa	October 1983
January 1984	Tu Guowei	zh:屠国维	(*1928): From January 1984 to March 1987 he was ambassador in Kathmandu (Nepal).; From July 1987 to August 1991 he was ambassador in New Delhi (India).	Zhao Ziyang	Lokendra Bahadur Chand	March 1987
April 1987	Li Debiao	zh:李德标		Li Peng	Nagendra Prasad Rijal	August 1991
October 1991	Shao Jiongchu	zh:邵炯初		Li Peng	Girija Prasad Koirala	November 1995
November 1995	Zhang Jiuhuan	zh:张九桓	From November 1995 to May 1998 he was ambassador in Kathmandu (Nepal).; From August 2000 to April 2004 he was ambassador in Singapore.; From May 2004 to February 2009 he was ambassador in Bangkok (Thailand).	Li Peng	Sher Bahadur Deuba	May 1998
May 1998	Zeng Xuyong	zh:曾序勇		Zhu Rongji	Girija Prasad Koirala	July 2001
December 2001	Wu Congyong	zh:吴从勇	From December 2001 to September 2003 he was ambassador in Kathmandu (Nepal).; From June 2003 to June 2006 he was ambassador in Bahrain.	Zhu Rongji	Sher Bahadur Deuba	September 2003
September 2003	Sun Heping	zh:孙和平	From September 2003 to March 2007 he was ambassador in Kathmandu (Nepal).; From December 2007 to October 2011 he was ambassador in Kampala (Uganda).	Wen Jiabao	Surya Bahadur Thapa	March 2007
April 2007	Zheng Xianglin	zh:郑祥林	From April 2007 to November 2008 he was ambassador in Kathmandu (Nepal).; From December 2011 to February 2015 he was ambassador in Brunei.	Wen Jiabao	Girija Prasad Koirala	November 2008
November 2008	Qiu Guohong	zh:邱国洪		Wen Jiabao	Pushpa Kamal Dahal	July 2011
July 2011	Yang Houlan	zh:杨厚兰		Wen Jiabao	Baburam Bhattarai	March 2013
March 13, 2013	Wu Chuntai	zh:吴春太		Li Keqiang	Khil Raj Regmi	November 2016
November 2016	Yu Hong	zh:于红		Li Keqiang	Pushpa Kamal Dahal	December 2018
December 2018	Hou Yanqi	zh:侯艳琪		Li Keqiang	KP Sharma Oli	October 2022
January 2023	Chen Song	zh:陈松		Li Keqiang	KP Sharma Oli	
