= Koreatown Immigrant Workers Alliance =

American civil rights organization

- 한인타운 노동연대
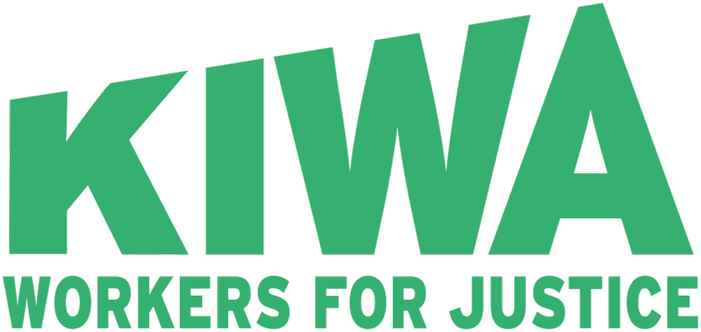

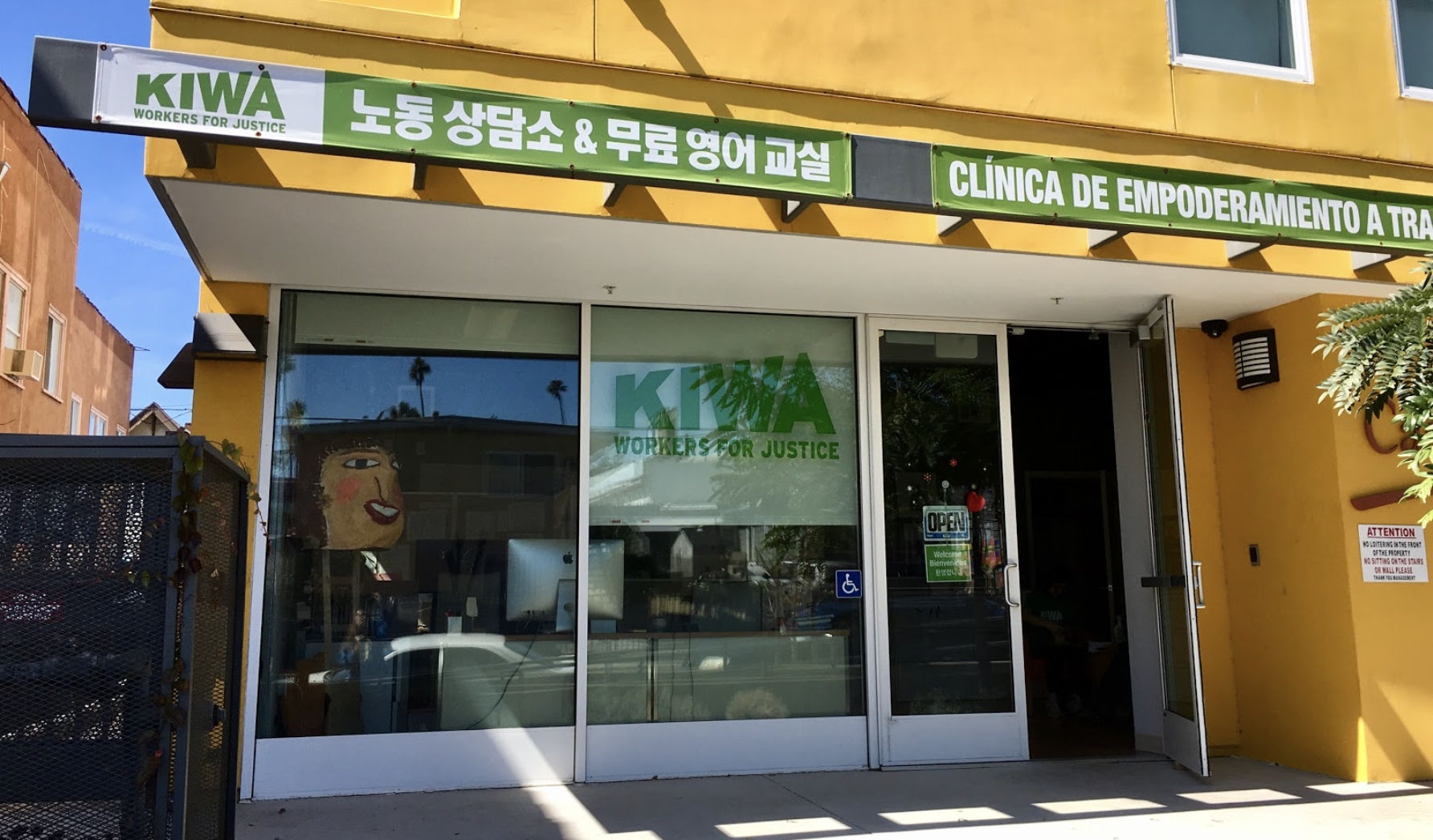
- KIWA office in Koreatown in 2018.
- Founded: 1992
- Type: Non-Profit Organization
- Location(s): 1053 S New Hampshire Ave; Los Angeles, CA 90006
- Region served: Koreatown, Los Angeles
- Website: kiwa.org

The Koreatown Immigrant Workers Alliance (KIWA, pronounced kee-wah), also known under its past name Korean Immigrant Workers Advocates (Korean: 남가주 한인 노동 상담소), is a multi-ethnic immigrant worker civil rights membership organization based in the Los Angeles Koreatown area.

KIWA was founded in 1992 by progressive-minded Korean activists who saw class as the basic contradiction of the immigrant communities in Koreatown. It has since been involved in the aftermath of the 1992 Los Angeles Civil Unrest, campaigns to improve working conditions and immigrant worker empowerment in various Korean ethnic industries, the living wages campaign, and Koreatown's multi-ethnic community developments.

KIWA is perhaps best known recently for its long campaign against Assi Market, the largest ethnic Korean-owned supermarket of the United States, located in Koreatown. Started in the late 1990s, KIWA demands that Assi management rehire dozens of fired Latino and Korean workers who were fired for trying to organize a trade union.

Although initially staffed mostly by ethnic Koreans, KIWA grew to encompass Asian-Pacific American and Latino organizers and members. The Spanish language "Alianza de trabajadores inmigrantes del Barrio Coreano" had been in common use since the early 2000s; however the English language name was officially changed in March 2006 from Korean Immigrant Workers Advocates to Koreatown Immigrant Workers Alliance. The Korean language "한인노동상담소" (Korean Worker's Center) has been changed to 한인타운 노동연대 to signify its geographical focus rather than on an ethnic group.

KIWA is a member organization of MIWON (Multi-Ethnic Immigrant Workers Alliance ), an alliance of four (formerly five) immigrant worker centers in the Los Angeles area, and ENLACE, a U.S.-Mexico network of worker centers.
