= Central City Value High School =

High school in Los Angeles, California

Coordinates: 34.0751°N 118.2885°W

Central City Value High School or CCVHS is an alternative charter high school of the Los Angeles Unified School District located in Koreatown, central Los Angeles, California .

The school offers a high school education to students, in grades 9–12.

There are approximately 400 students.
