= Koreatown, Los Angeles =

Neighborhood in California, US

Koreatown
- Neighborhood of Los Angeles
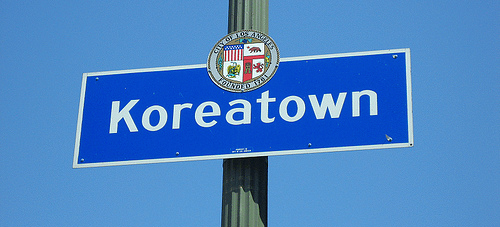
- City of Los Angeles Koreatown marker
- Nickname: "K-Town"
- Approximate location in Los Angeles
- Coordinates: 34.0618°N 118.3006°W
- Country: United States
- State: California
- County: Los Angeles
- City: Los Angeles

Government
  - City Council: Heather Hutt, Nithya Raman, Mitch O'Farrell
  - State Assembly: Miguel Santiago (D)
  - State Senate: Maria Elena Durazo (D)
  - U.S. House: Jimmy Gomez (D)

Area (about 150 blocks)
  - Total: 2.7 sq mi (7.0 km^{2})

Population (2008)
  - Total: 124,281
  - Density: 46,208/sq mi (17,841/km^{2})
- Population changes significantly depending on areas included and recent growth.
- ZIP Code: 90010, 90005, 90006
- Area codes: 213, 323

Koreatown (Korean: 코리아타운) is a neighborhood in central Los Angeles, California, centered near Sixth and Alexandria streets.

Koreans began immigrating in larger numbers in the 1960s and found housing in the Mid-Wilshire area. Many opened businesses as they found friendly rental rates and tolerance toward the growing Korean population. Many of the historic Art Deco buildings with terra cotta façades have been preserved because the buildings remained economically viable for the new businesses.

Despite the name evoking a traditional ethnic enclave, the community is complex and has an impact on areas outside the traditional boundaries. While the neighborhood culture was historically oriented to the Korean immigrant population, Korean business owners are creating stronger ties to the Latino community in Koreatown. The community is highly diverse ethnically, with half the residents being Latino and a third being Asian. Two-thirds of the residents were born outside of the United States, a high figure compared to the rest of the city.

== History ==
=== 1900s–1980s ===
In 1882, the United States and Korea established the United States-Korea Treaty of 1882, which ended Korea's self-imposed isolation. The establishment of diplomatic relations between the United States and Korea paved the way for Korean immigration to Hawaii in the late 1880s. In the early 1900s, Korean immigrants began making their way to Los Angeles, where they created communities based around ethnic churches. As the number of Koreans increased to the hundreds, their residential and commercial activities spread to the southwestern corner of the Los Angeles business district, putting them within walking distance of Little Tokyo and Chinatown.

By the 1930s, approximately 650 Koreans resided in Los Angeles. They established churches, restaurants, and community organizations, as well as businesses that primarily focused on vegetable and fruit distribution. In 1936, the Korean National Association, one of the largest Korean immigrant political organizations, moved its central headquarters from San Francisco to Los Angeles to continue promoting political, cultural, educational, and religious activities. However, racial covenant laws and economic constraints limited Korean residents to an area bounded by Adams Boulevard to the north, Slauson Avenue to the south, Western Avenue to the west, and Vermont Avenue to the east. The 1930s also saw the height of the area's association with Hollywood. The Ambassador Hotel hosted the Academy Awards ceremony in 1930, 1931, 1932, and 1934. As the entertainment industry grew in the surrounding Koreatown area, Koreans remained segregated into low-income districts because of discriminatory housing policies. After the 1948 Shelley v. Kraemer Supreme Court case prohibited racially restrictive housing policies, Koreans began to move north of Olympic Boulevard to establish new homes and businesses.

In the late 1960s, the surrounding neighborhood began to enter a steep economic decline. The once-glamorous mid-Wilshire area became filled with vacant commercial and office space that attracted wealthier South Korean immigrants. They found inexpensive housing and many opened businesses in Koreatown. Many of the area's Art Deco buildings with terracotta facades were preserved because they remained economically viable with the new commercial activity that occupied them. The Immigration and Nationality Act of 1965 removed restrictions on Asian migration and helped further the growth of the immigrant community in Koreatown.

By the late 1970s, most businesses in the Olympic Boulevard and 8th Street areas were owned by Koreans. This economic boom led to the creation of Korean media outlets and community organizations, which played a key role in developing a sense of communal identity in the neighborhood. The ethnic enclave was able to establish itself as the primary hub of the Korean community in Southern California, and the residents successfully lobbied for the installation of the first Koreatown sign in 1982.

=== 1992 Los Angeles riots ===
During the time of the riots, there was racial strife between Black and Korean Americans. In many predominantly Black neighborhoods, Korean citizens owned the majority of businesses. When White residents left the area, Koreans purchased their businesses from them for little money. Rapper Ice Cube spoke of this, along with Asian suspicion of Black residents in his 1991 album Death Certificate during the song "Black Korea".

On March 16, 1991, a Korean store owner, Soon Ja Du, shot and killed a 15-year-old Black customer, Latasha Harlins. Du accused Harlins of stealing orange juice, and after watching her put down the jug and turn to leave, shot her in the head. Some historians view Du's posting bail as the breaking point in tensions.

The 1992 Los Angeles riots stimulated a new wave of political activism among Korean-Americans, but also split them into two camps. The liberals sought to unite with other minorities in Los Angeles to fight against racial oppression and scapegoating. The conservatives emphasized law and order and generally favored the economic and social policies of the Republican Party. The conservatives also tended to emphasize the political differences between Koreans and other minorities, specifically Blacks and Hispanics. Despite this divide within the Korean American community, the 1992 riots also inspired further efforts to build coalitions. The 1992 Koreatown Peace Rally was a record-setting demonstration with over 30,000 attendees representing intergenerational and interethnic solidarity.

The week-long rioting and looting destroyed much of Koreatown. There was $50 million worth of damage done, half of which was on Korean-owned businesses. During the riots, roads between Koreatown and safer neighborhoods were blocked off. Some Korean-Americans speculated that they were being trapped in the danger. One resident said, "It was containment. The police cut off traffic out of Koreatown, while we were trapped on the other side without help. Those roads are a gateway to a richer neighborhood. It can't be denied." Some Korean Americans who survived the riot have said that people of minority races and ethnicities were not served fairly by the current social system.

An 18-year-old Korean American, Edward Song Lee, and his three friends went to protect a Korean-owned pizza shop, along with other store owners and volunteers who would constitute the rooftop Koreans. Lee was accidentally shot to death by Korean shopkeepers who mistook him and his friends for looters. Hyungwon Kang captured a photograph of Lee's body in the street.

The 1992 unrest had a significant impact on the community, solidifying the importance of community-based nonprofit organizations, such as the Koreatown Youth and Community Center (KYCC) and Koreatown Immigrant Workers Alliance (KIWA) (see Community Organizations section). These organizations advocated for reparations and protections for Korean Americans, who received little support from government authorities as a result of their low social status and language barrier.

=== 2000s–present ===
In late 2008, the City of Los Angeles designated Koreatown a special graphics district (along with Hollywood and the downtown neighborhood of South Park/LA Live). The designation allows for digital signage and electronic billboards, not permitted by city code, to be installed on building facades. The designation allowed Times Square and Shibuya District-inspired buildings lined with LCD jumbotrons. The 300-square block graphics district is bordered by 6th Street and Olympic Boulevard on the north and south respectively, and St. Andrews Place and Shatto Place on the west and east respectively.

The construction of the Robert F. Kennedy Community Schools at the former site of the Ambassador Hotel highlighted the challenge of balancing resource expansion with business development and historic preservation. The schools were constructed with the intention of increasing educational opportunities for low-income Latina/Latino and Korean students, but the $578 million construction cost made the complex the most expensive public school in United States history. By 2020, Koreatown was "known for having one of the largest concentrations of nightclubs and 24-hour businesses and restaurants in the country. Other developments, such as the opening of new metro stations, shopping centers, and strip malls, have made Koreatown a popular tourist destination while also increasing economic inequality for locals. Protests against and in favor of building a homeless shelter took place in 2020.

Since Koreatown has a Latino majority, it is not unusual to find Latino employees in restaurants and grocery stores speaking Korean with customers or Korean store owners engaging Latino customers in Spanish. An example of a cultural interchange between Koreans and Latinos in Koreatown is the popularity of Korean-inspired taco trucks in Los Angeles that feature classic Mexican food infused with Korean ingredients.

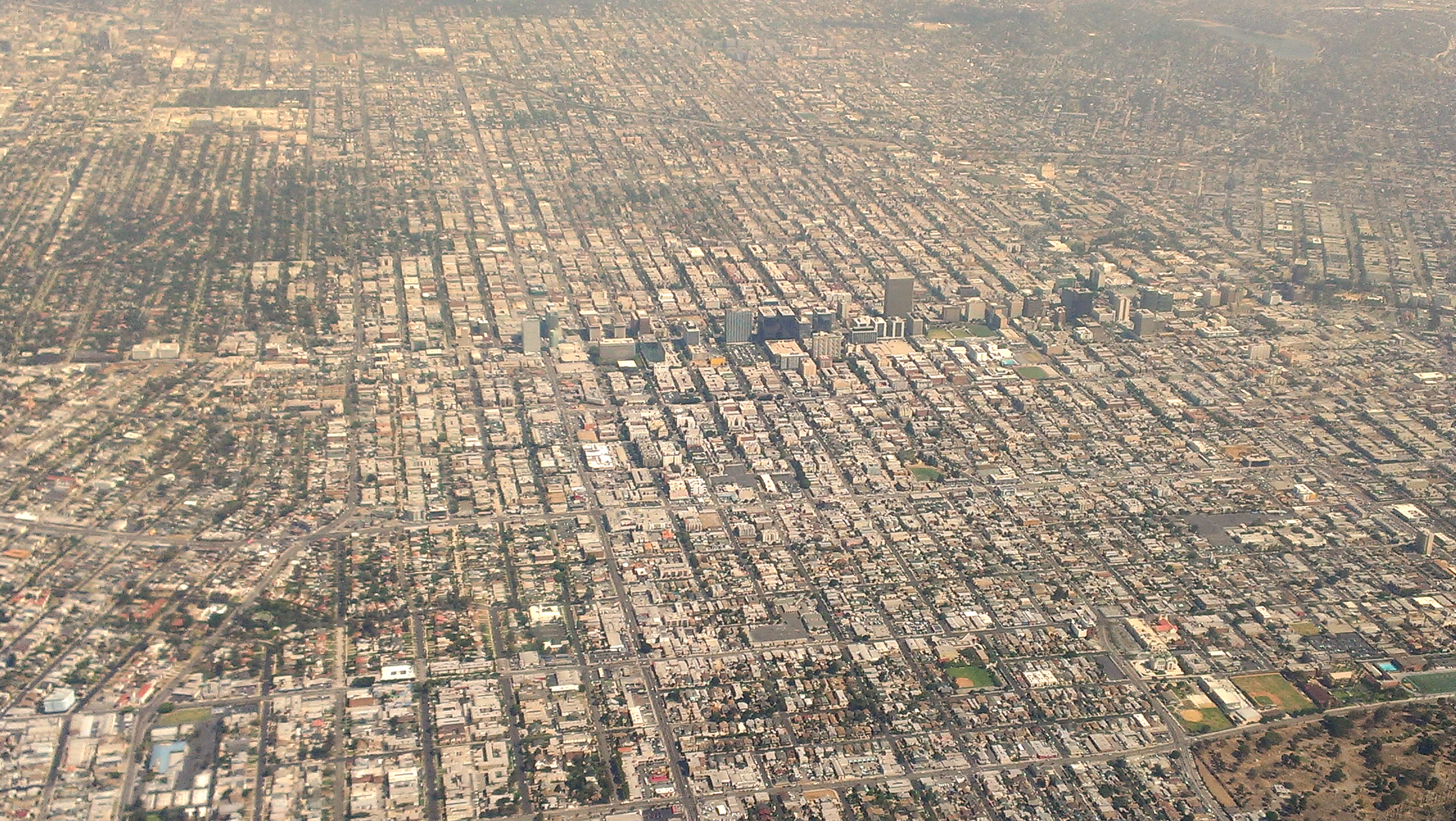
Aerial view in 2014

== Geography ==
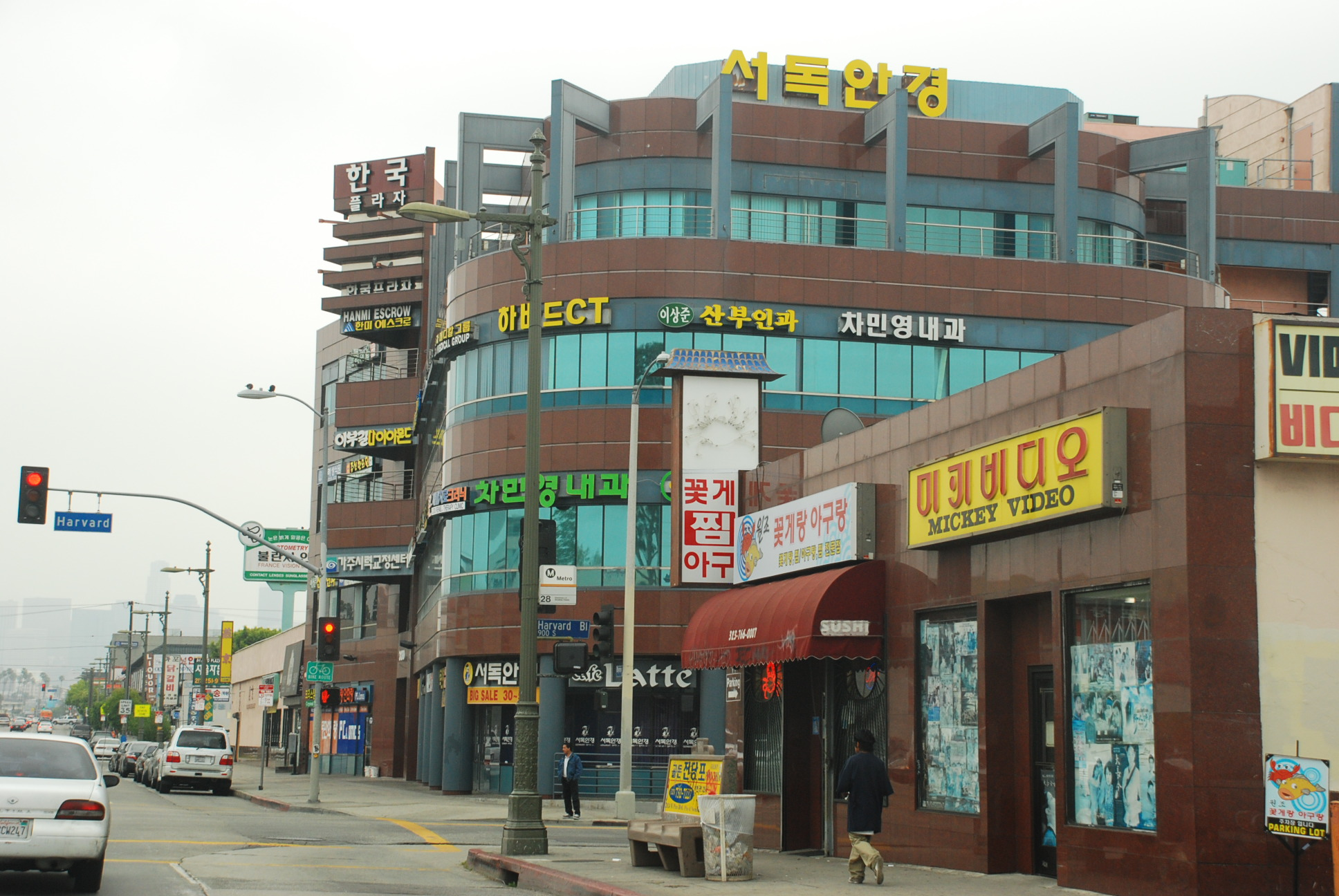
Olympic Blvd at Harvard, Los Angeles, 2007

The neighborhood lies 3 miles (5 km) west of downtown, 4 miles (6 km) southeast of Hollywood, 12 miles (19 km) east of Santa Monica Beach and 16 miles (26 km) northeast of Los Angeles International Airport. It is generally flat, with an average elevation of 200 feet (61 m).

The boundaries of Koreatown are blurry; The most familiar thoroughfare is Wilshire Boulevard, from Vermont to Western avenues. But the area extends south as Olympic Boulevard and north to Beverly Blvd, with spillover into adjacent Westlake and Hancock Park.

=== The beginnings of Koreatown ===
In the early 1900s, Koreans clustered around the downtown Los Angeles Bunker Hill area. This housing segregation was due to racial covenant laws that restricted them to mixed-race, low-income districts. By the 1930s, Koreans began to move to Jefferson Boulevard between Western and Vermont Avenue.

The next major shift began in the 1960s. As the African American population increased in southern Los Angeles, middle-class White Americans began to move out of the mid-Wilshire district. The area north of Olympic Boulevard transitioned from a predominantly white suburb to a home for Asian residents. The area has become the mainstay of the Korean American community, although varying sources have established different boundaries for Koreatown.

In 1980, the neighborhood of Koreatown was officially designated by Los Angeles.

=== City of Los Angeles boundaries ===
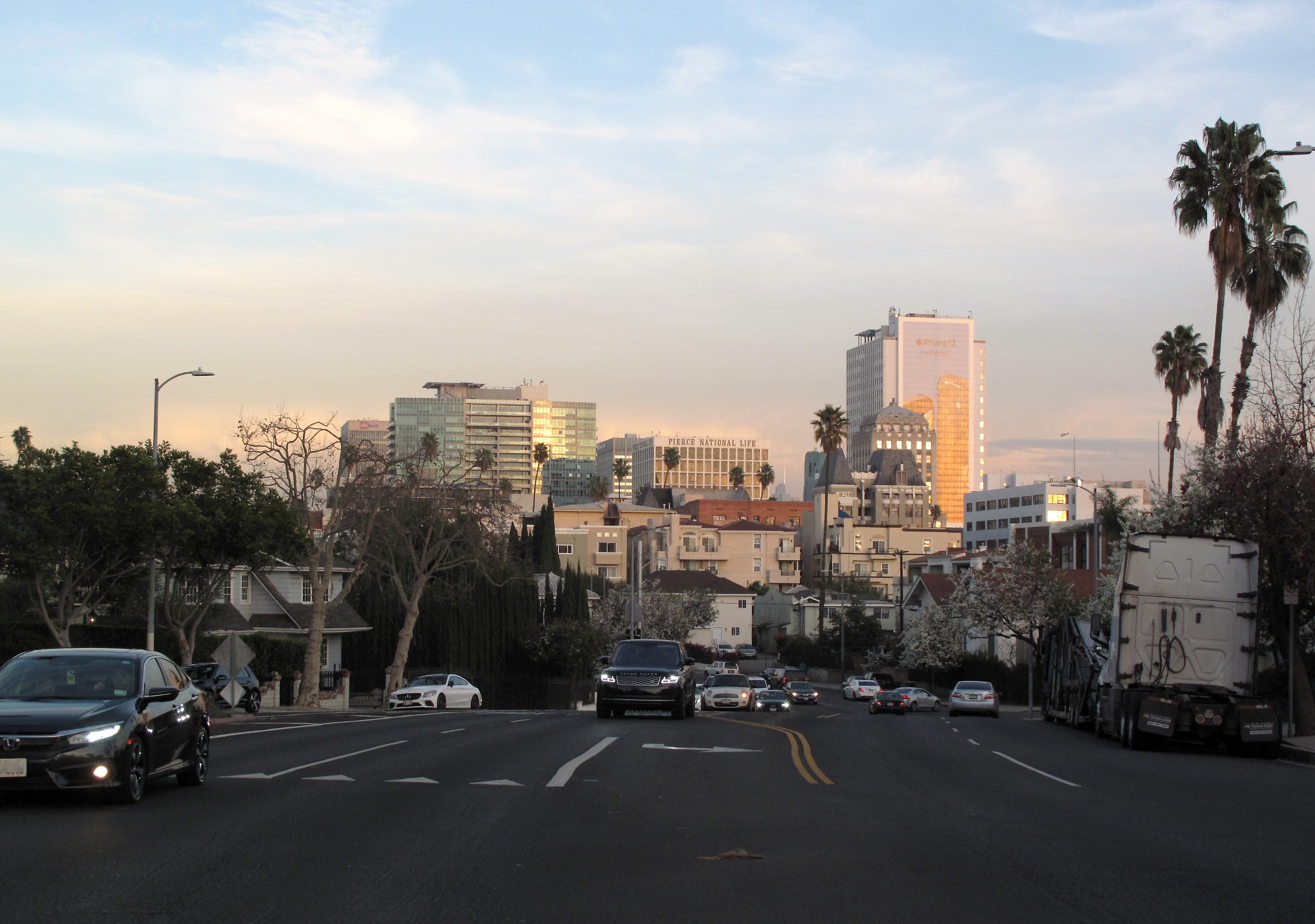
View of high-rises along Wilshire between Western and Vermont

The city of Los Angeles has set the official boundaries for Koreatown as Vermont Avenue on the east, Western Avenue on the west, Third Street on the north, and Olympic Boulevard on the south. A business corridor running about 3/4 of a mile along Western Avenue to Rosewood Avenue is also included as part of Koreatown.

In 2010, the City of Los Angeles considered expanding Koreatown further west to include Wilshire Park and Park Mile. The request was rejected, and the committee reiterated that the western boundary for Koreatown was at Western Avenue.

The Koreatown Regional Commercial Center runs along Olympic Boulevard and is "generally bounded by Eighth Street on the north, Twelfth Street on the south, Western Avenue on the west, and continues east towards Vermont Avenue", according to the Wilshire Community Plan of the City of Los Angeles.

=== Google Maps ===
Google Maps draws the following boundaries for Koreatown: Vermont Avenue on the east, S Wilton Place on the west, Third Street on the north and Olympic Boulevard on the south.

=== Mapping L.A. boundaries ===
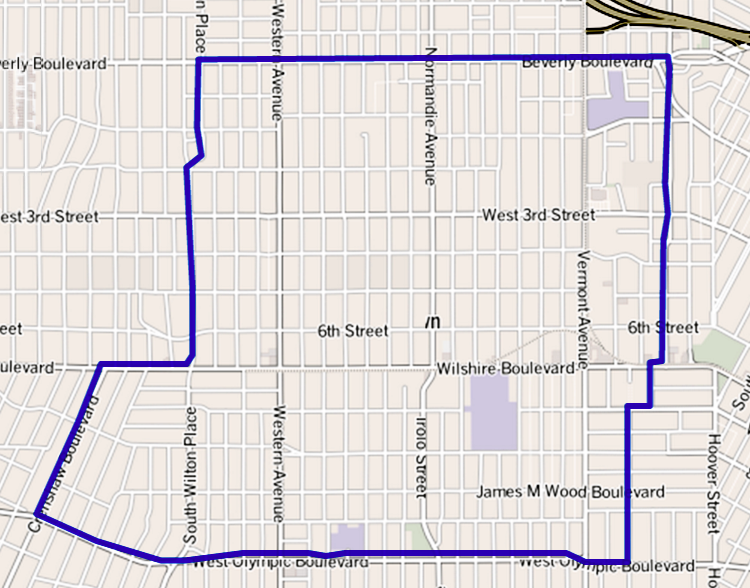
Map of Koreatown as delineated by the Los Angeles Times

According to the Mapping L.A. project of the Los Angeles Times, Koreatown has the following boundaries:

Beverly Boulevard on the north, Virgil Avenue, Wilshire Place and Westmoreland Avenue on the east, Olympic Boulevard on the south and Crenshaw Boulevard and Wilton Place on the west. The neighborhood is flanked by East Hollywood to the north, Westlake to the east, Pico-Union, Harvard Heights and Arlington Heights to the south, Mid-Wilshire and Windsor Square to the west and Larchmont to the northwest.

This version of Koreatown includes the neighborhoods of Wilshire Center, Wilshire Park and part of Park Mile.

=== Climate ===
Climate data for Koreatown, Los Angeles
Month	Jan	Feb	Mar	Apr	May	Jun	Jul	Aug	Sep	Oct	Nov	Dec	Year
Mean daily maximum °F (°C)	68 (20)	69 (21)	70 (21)	73 (23)	75 (24)	80 (27)	84 (29)	85 (29)	84 (29)	79 (26)	73 (23)	69 (21)	76 (24)
Mean daily minimum °F (°C)	47 (8)	49 (9)	50 (10)	53 (12)	57 (14)	60 (16)	64 (18)	65 (18)	63 (17)	58 (14)	51 (11)	47 (8)	55 (13)
Average precipitation inches (mm)	3.39 (86)	3.72 (94)	3.14 (80)	0.82 (21)	0.29 (7.4)	0.06 (1.5)	0.02 (0.51)	0.14 (3.6)	0.32 (8.1)	0.39 (9.9)	1.12 (28)	1.93 (49)	15.34 (390)

== Demographics ==
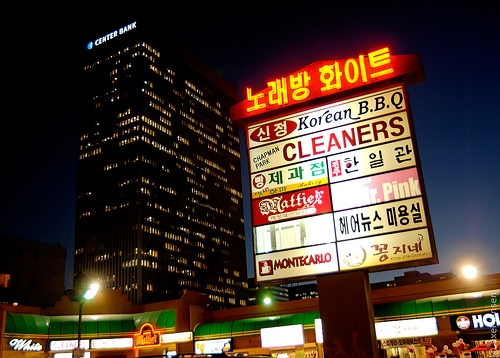
6th Street at Kenmore

Koreatown is one of the densest neighborhoods in the United States.

The 2000 U.S. census counted 115,070 residents in the 2.7-square-mile neighborhood—an average of 42,611 people per square mile, the highest density of any community in Los Angeles County. In 2008, the city estimated that the population had increased to 124,281. The median age for residents was 30, an average age for both the city and Los Angeles County.

Koreatown is considered "highly diverse" ethnically. The breakdown is Latinos, 53.5%; Asians, 32.2%; whites, 7.4%; blacks, 4.8%, and others, 2%. Korea (28.6%) and Mexico (23.9%) were the most common places of birth for the 68% of the residents who were born abroad, a figure that is considered high compared to the city as a whole.

The median annual household income in 2008 dollars was $30,558, a low figure for Los Angeles, and the percentage of households that earned less than $20,000 was high. The average household size of 2.7 people was about the same as the rest of the city. Renters occupied 93% of the housing units, and house- or apartment owners the rest.

The percentages of never-married men and women, 44.6% and 36.2%, respectively, were among the county's highest. There were 2,833 military veterans in 2000, or 3.3%, a low figure for Los Angeles.

=== Homeless population ===
In 2022, there were 435 homeless individuals in Koreatown.

== Economy ==
Olympic Boulevard has blocks dominated by Korean-language signs and new blue-tile-roofed shopping centers. This initial Korean business area has spread to an area bounded by Olympic Boulevard, Vermont Avenue, 8th Street and Western Avenue. The Korean business area also sprawls to the north and south along Western and Vermont for three miles, and to the east and west along Olympic for two miles. South Korean investment has been a large contributor to the neighborhood economy since the 1960s. Since the early 2000s, that investment has increased greatly, ballooning to an estimated $1 billion in new construction investment. Jamison Services, Inc is Koreatown's biggest landlord and a prolific residential builder. The area also has a vibrant nightlife with many restaurants and clubs, with Korean barbeque restaurants and karaoke bars.

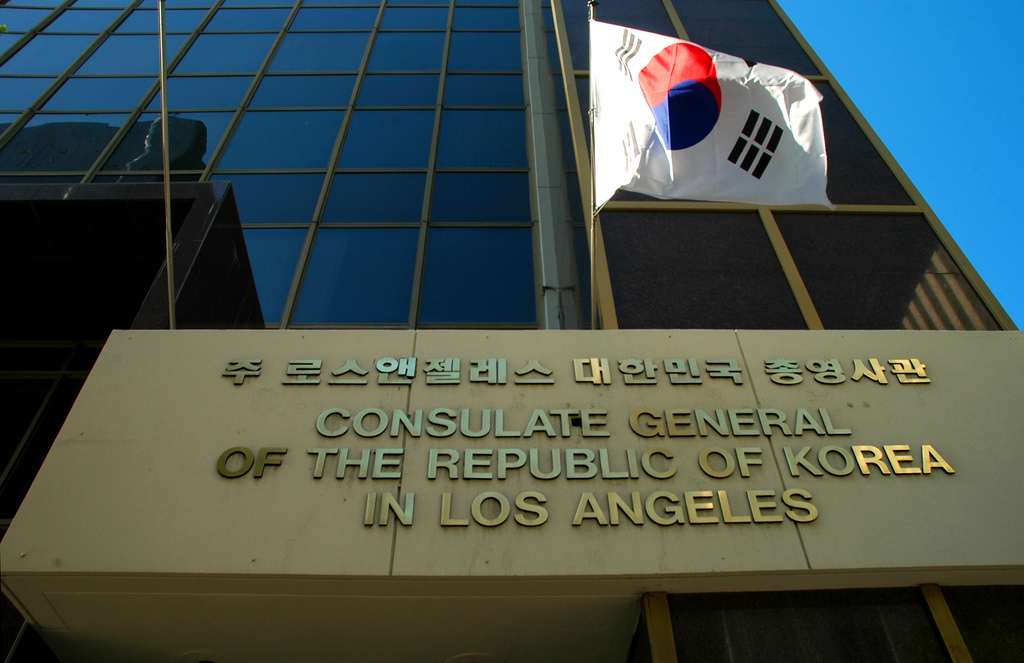
Consulate-General of South Korea in Los Angeles

Asiana Airlines operates a sales office in Koreatown. Korean Air's United States Passenger Operations headquarters are located in close proximity to Koreatown in the Westlake community. Grupo TACA operates a Los Angeles-area TACA Center in Suite 100P at 3600 Wilshire Boulevard.

The Consulate-General of South Korea in Los Angeles is at 3243 Wilshire Boulevard. The Consulate General of the People's Republic of China in Los Angeles is at 443 Shatto Place, while the passport and visa office is on the third floor of 500 Shatto Place. The Consulate General of El Salvador is at 3450 Wilshire Blvd. Suite 250 and the Consulate General of Guatemala is at 3540 Wilshire Blvd. Suite 100. The Consulate General of Honduras and Nicaragua are at 3550 Wilshire Blvd. The Consulate General of Bolivia is at 3701 Wilshire Blvd #1056. The Consulate General of Indonesia is at 3457 Wilshire Blvd., while the Consulate General of the Philippines, which has been in Koreatown since 1967, is presently located next door at the fifth floor of the Equitable Life Building at 3435 Wilshire Blvd.

== Government ==
The Wilshire Center – Koreatown Neighborhood Council is designated by the City of Los Angeles to represent the area's citizens' concerns to the city. The area represented by the council includes Koreatown and Wilshire Center, as well as parts of MacArthur Park, Hancock Park, and Mid-Wilshire.

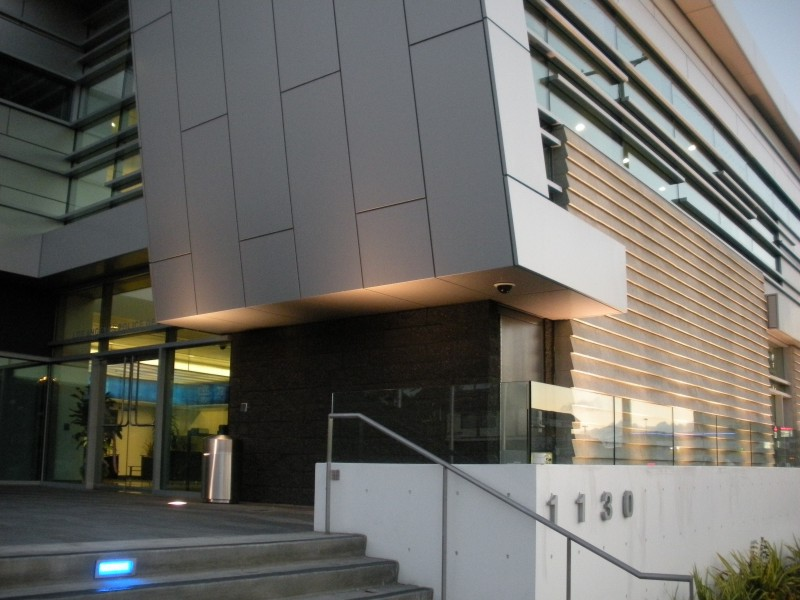
LAPD's Olympic Station, serves Koreatown

=== Representatives ===
Koreatown lies within Los Angeles City Council District 10. As of 2023, it is represented on the city council by Heather Hutt. The area is represented by Holly Mitchell, Supervisor of District 2 for Los Angeles County. Miguel Santiago is the State Assemblyman for District 53, which includes Koreatown. Jimmy Gomez of California's 34th congressional district represents the area in the United States House of Representatives.

=== Fire service ===
Four Fire Stations of the Los Angeles Fire Department serve Koreatown:

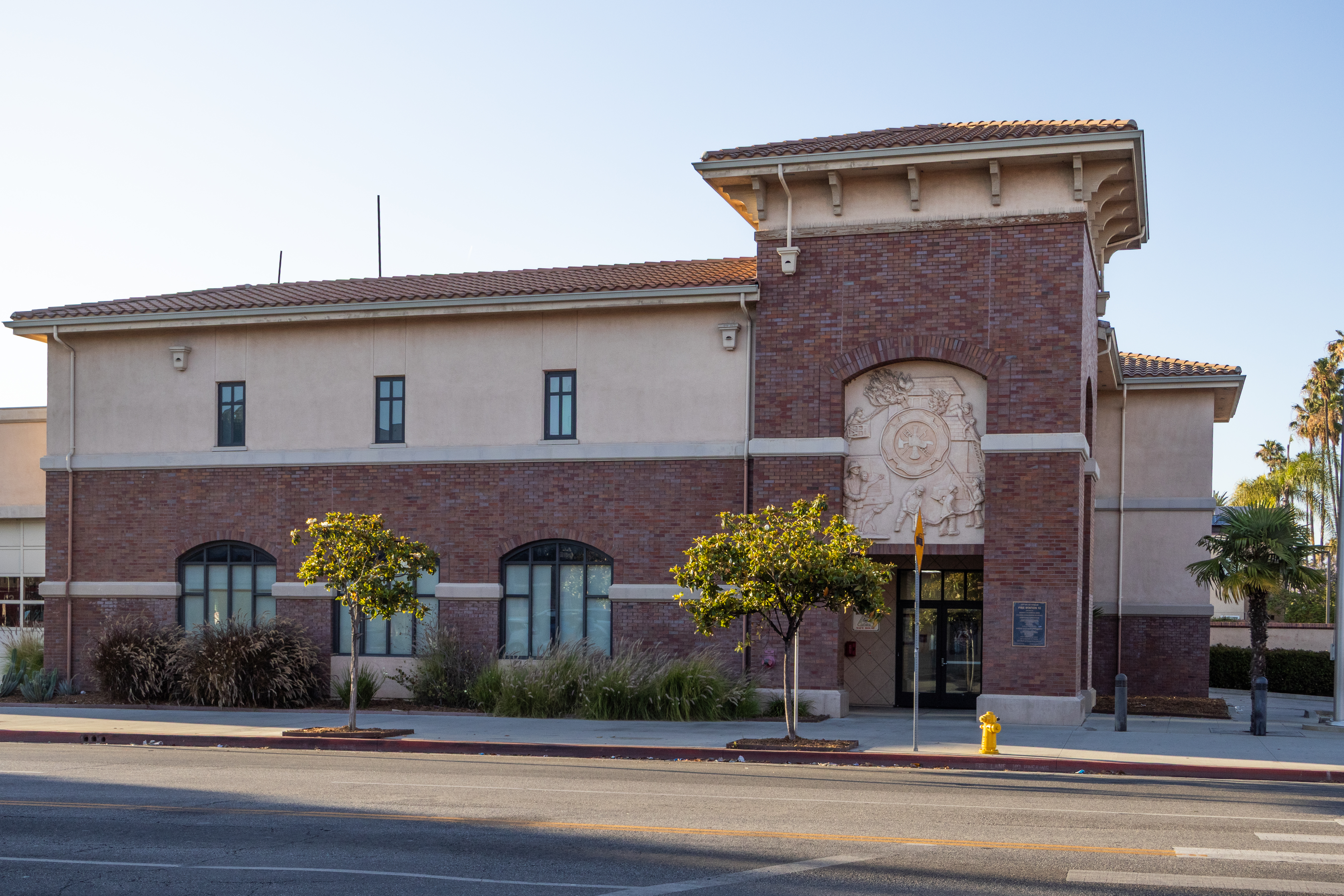
LAFD Station 13 serving Southeast Koreatown at Pico Blvd. and Westmoreland Avenue.

Station 29 serving Southwest Koreatown at Wilshire Blvd. and Wilton Avenue.
Station 13 serving Southeast Koreatown at Pico Blvd. and Westmoreland Avenue.
Station 52 serving Northwest Koreatown at Melrose Avenue and Western Avenue.
Station 6 serving Northeast Koreatown at Temple Street and Virgil Avenue.

=== Police service ===
The Los Angeles Police Department provides police service to the City of Los Angeles, broken up into 21 local divisions. Koreatown is served by Olympic Division. The new station completed construction and opened for service on January 4, 2009.

== Education ==
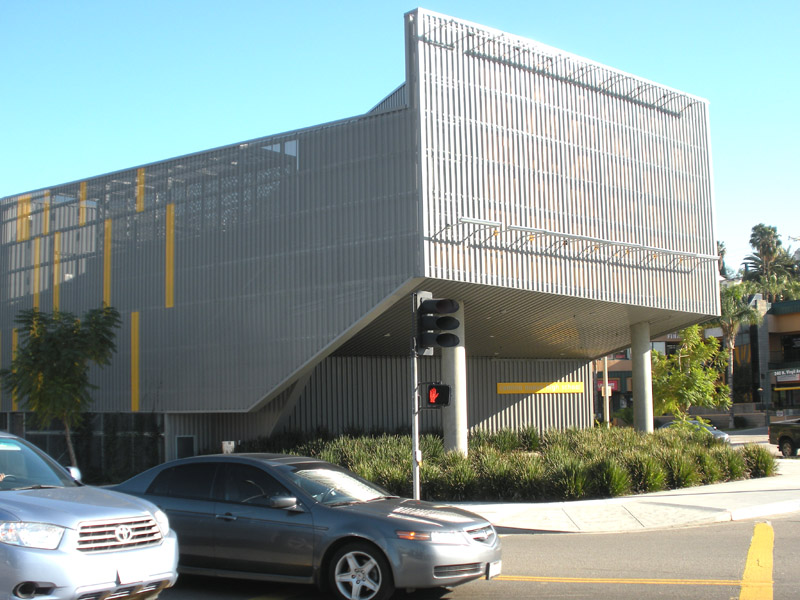
Camino Nuevo Charter Academy

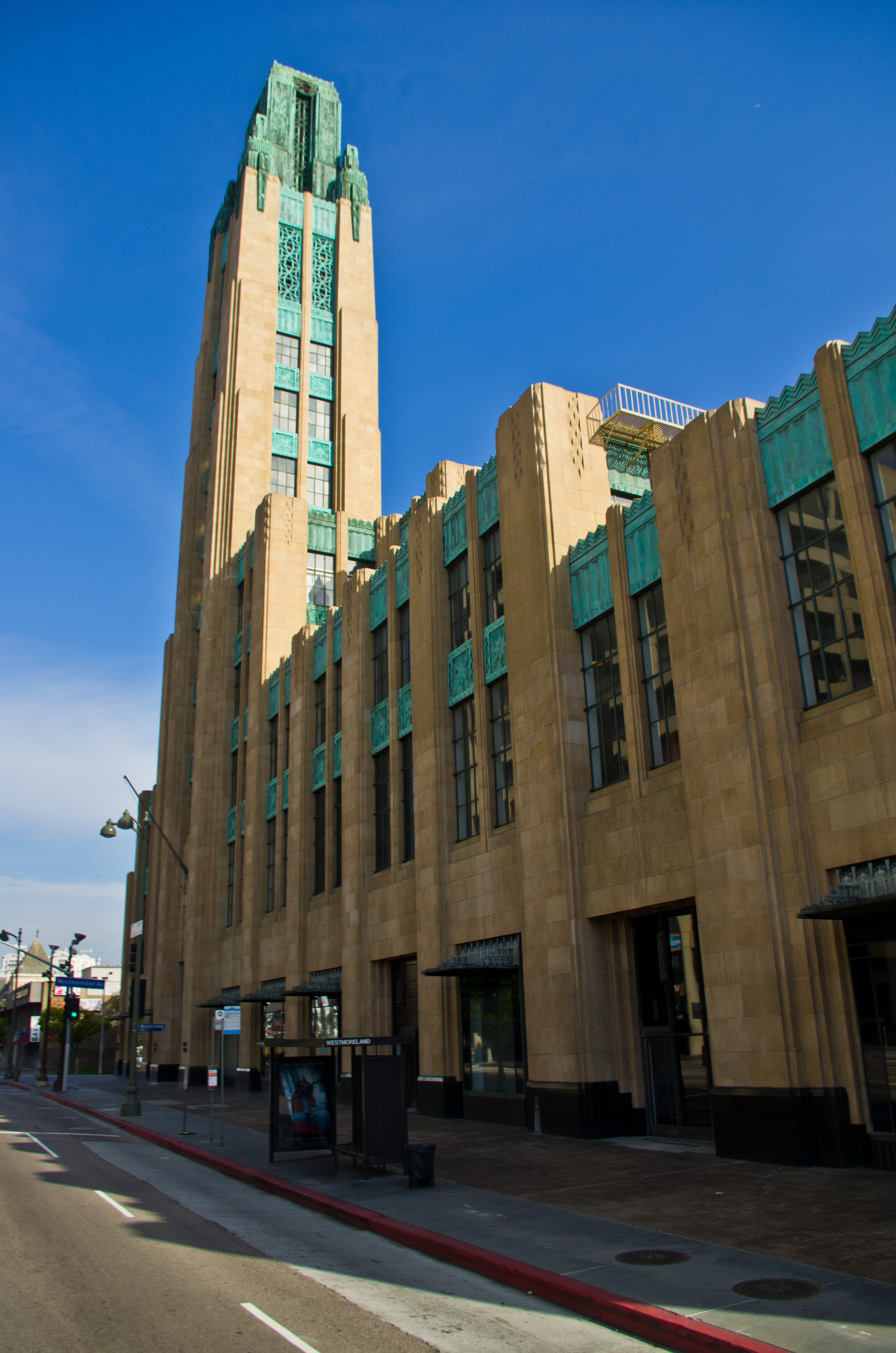
Southwestern School of Law

21.4% of Koreatown residents aged 25 and older have a four-year degree, an average rate for both the city and the county. The percentage of residents with less than a high school diploma was high for the county.

Schools within the Koreatown borders are:

- Central City Value, LAUSD charter high school, 221 North Westmoreland Avenue
- Ambassador School of Global Leadership, LAUSD K-12, 701 South Catalina Street
- New Open World Academy, LAUSD K-12, 3201 West Eighth Street
- UCLA Community School, LAUSD K-12, 701 South Catalina Street
- Virgil Middle School, LAUSD, 152 North Vermont Avenue
- Young Oak Kim Academy, LAUSD, 615 S. Shatto Place
- Cahuenga Elementary School, LAUSD, 220 South Hobart Boulevard
- Saint Brendan School, private elementary, 238 South Manhattan Place
- New Horizon School/Los Angeles, private elementary, 434 South Vermont Avenue
- Saint James' Episcopal Day School, private elementary, 625 South Saint Andrews Place
- Camino Nuevo Charter Academy, LAUSD charter, 697 South Burlington Avenue
- Saint Gregory Nazianzen, private elementary, 911 South Norton Avenue
- Wilton Place Elementary School, LAUSD, 745 South Wilton Place
- Hobart Boulevard Elementary School, LAUSD, 980 South Hobart Boulevard
- Mariposa-Nabi Primary Center, LAUSD, 987 South Mariposa Avenue
- Pilgrim School, private preK-12, 540 South Commonwealth Avenue
- Larchmont Charter School – Layfayette Park Campus, 8–12, 2801 W 6th Street
- Berendo Middle school – 1157 S Berendo St, Los Angeles, CA 90006
- Los Angeles Senior High – 4650 W Olympic Blvd, Los Angeles, CA 90019

=== Other education ===
The Korean Education Center, affiliated with the government of South Korea, is in Suite 200 at 680 Wilshire Place.

Southwestern Law School offers degree and non-degree programs in the Westmoreland Building and the former Bullock's Wilshire building at 3050 Wilshire Boulevard.

=== Public libraries ===
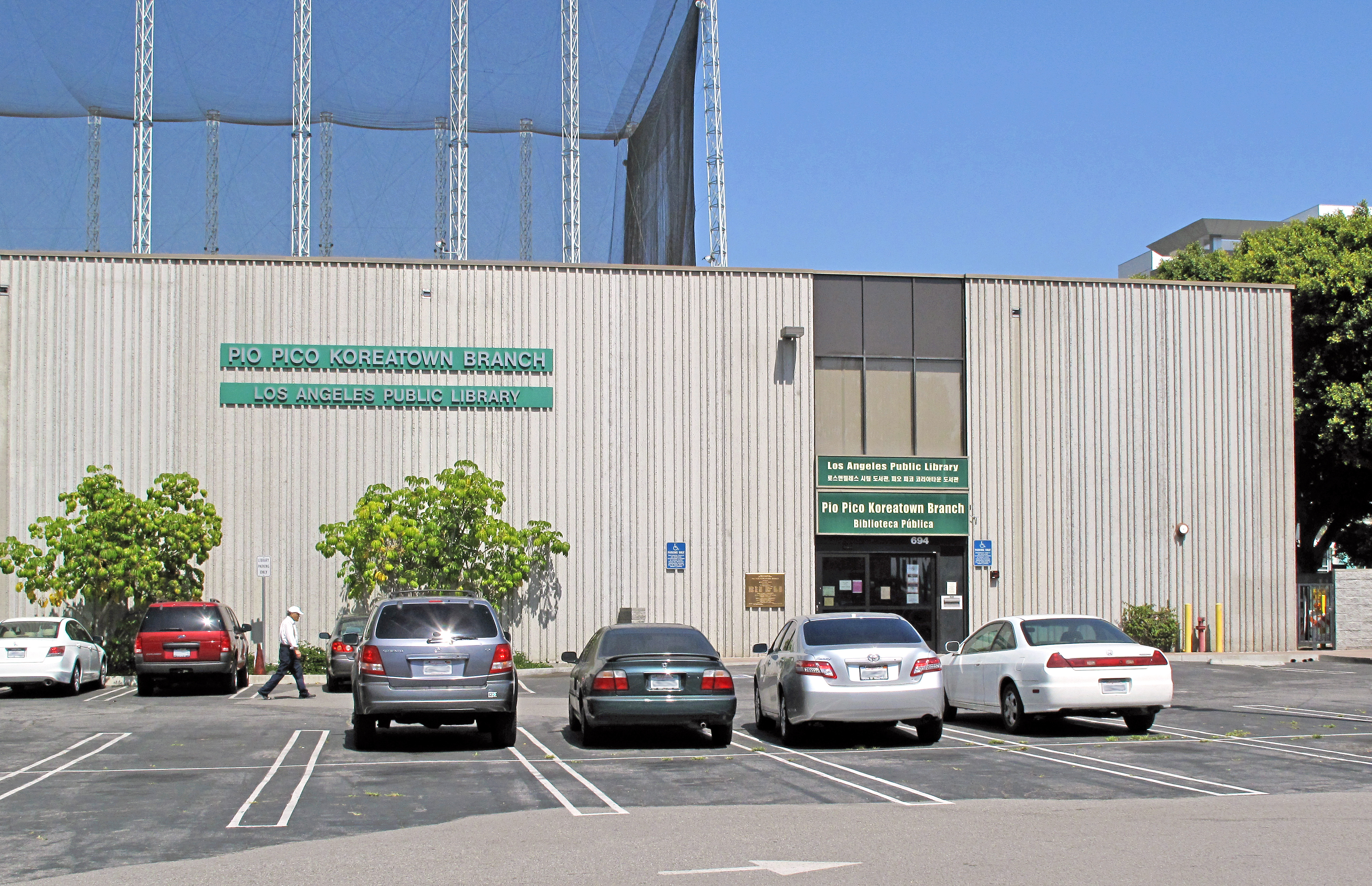
Pio Pico Koreatown Branch Library

- Pio Pico Koreatown Branch Library (피오 피코 코리아타운 도서관) of the Los Angeles Public Library serves the area.

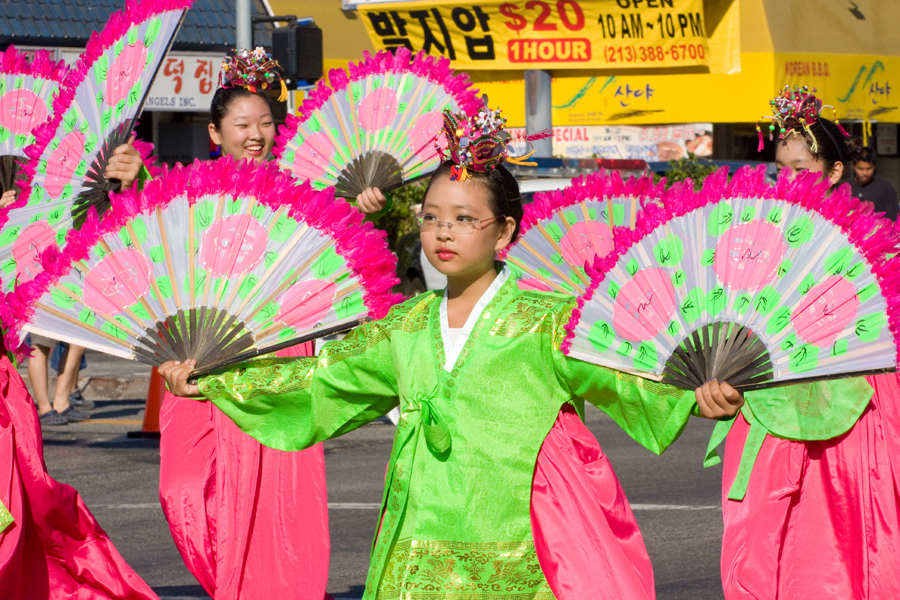
Parade performers during the Korean Festival

=== Festivals ===
Annual festivals include the Korean Festival & Parade on Olympic Boulevard, with a march to the Seoul Peace Park. The Wilshire Center Business Improvement District (WCBID) holds the annual Earth Day / Car Free Day Festival every April 22 on Wilshire. KTOWN Night Market holds an annual festival at Robert F. Kennedy Community Schools.

=== Community organizations ===
- The popular Anderson-Munger YMCA at 3rd and Oxford offers swimming, exercise programs, child and teen programs, and social services to the community.
- Koreatown Immigrant Workers Alliance (KIWA) organizes in the community on behalf of social change.

== Transportation ==
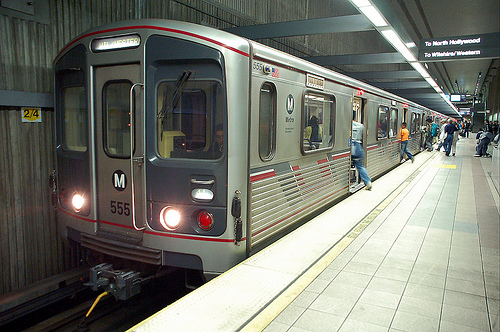
B Line train at the Wilshire-Vermont Metro station in Koreatown

The Los Angeles County Metropolitan Transportation Authority operates two subway lines in or near Koreatown — the B Line, beneath Vermont Avenue, and the D Line, beneath Wilshire Boulevard. The neighborhood is served primarily by the D Line Wilshire/Normandie station, but there are two other stops, Wilshire/Vermont and Wilshire/Western.

In addition to the two subway lines, Metro operates numerous Express, Rapid and Local bus lines in the district. Rapid lines include the 720 Wilshire and 754 Vermont. Local lines include the 207 Western, 14 Beverly, 16 3rd Street, 18 6th Street, 20 Wilshire/Westwood, 66 8th Street, 28 Olympic, 204 Vermont, 206 Normandie, and 210 Crenshaw. Many MTA bus lines in Koreatown offer 24-hour service.

The LADOT operates three district-to-district DASH routes, one Commuter Express line and Cityride. Koreatown is served by DASH Hollywood/Wilshire line and Dash Koreatown. The DASH lines are meant for local neighborhood transportation; their routes are shorter than MTA lines. DASH service ends at 7pm weekdays and only Dash Koreatown operates on weekends, ending service at 6pm. DASH fares are 50 cents. Commuter Express line 534 Century City provides weekday service while Cityride offers door to door dial-a-ride service for the elderly and disabled.

== Notable places ==
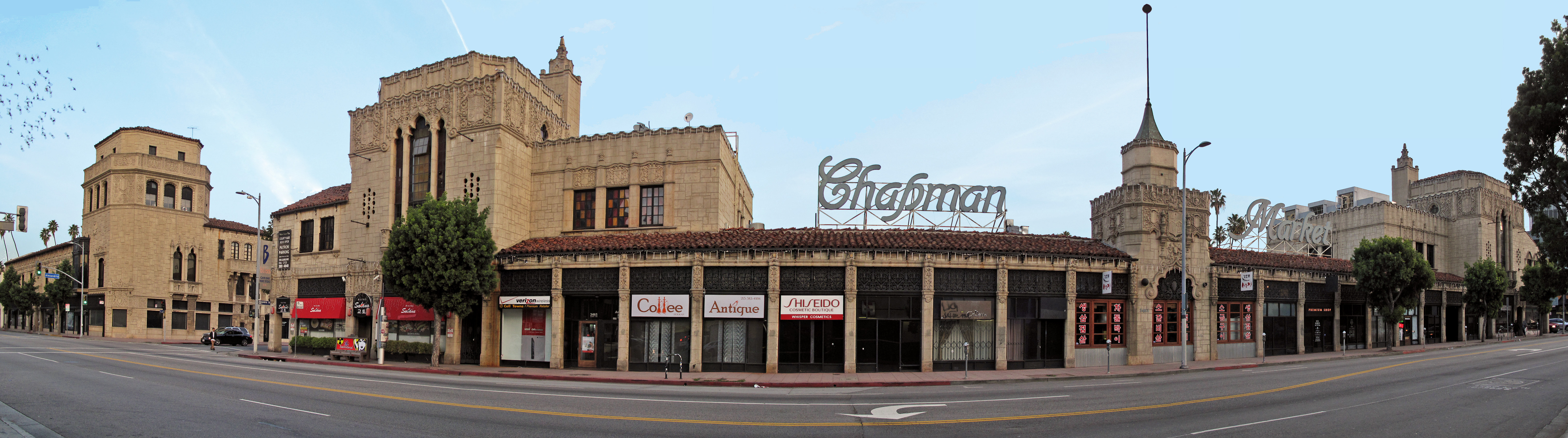
Chapman Park Market

- The Korean American National Museum – 3727 West 6th Street
- The Korean Cultural Center – 5505 Wilshire Boulevard
- Korean Pavilion and parklet, Normandie Avenue just north of Olympic Boulevard

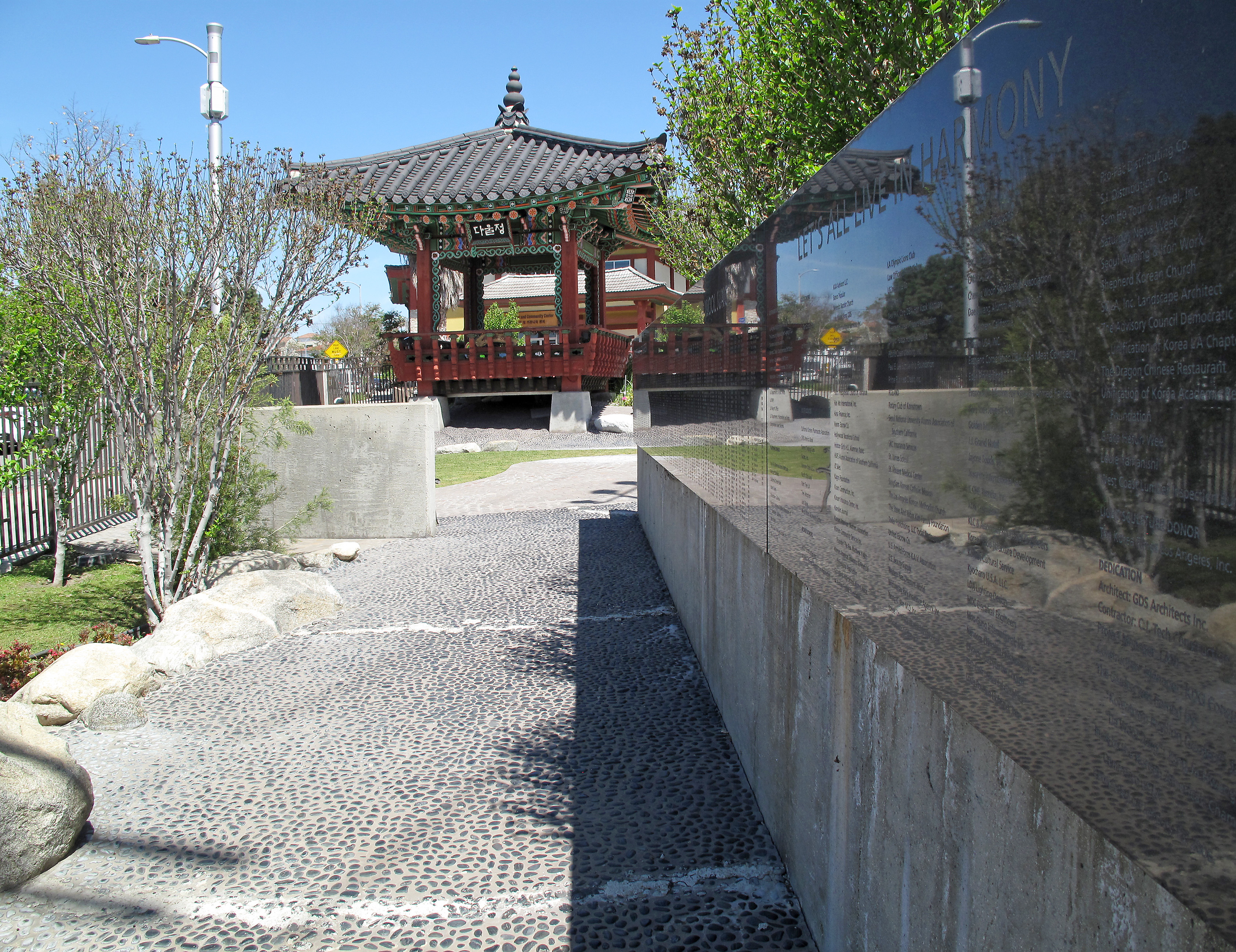
Korean Pavilion and parklet

- Koreatown Plaza – 928 South Western Avenue
- Chapman Park Market, 3405 West 6th Street
- The Wiltern Theater at Wilshire Boulevard and Western Avenue.
- Liberty Park – 3700 Wilshire Boulevard
- LA Metro subway station, Western Avenue and Wilshire Boulevard.
- Bimini Baths

== See also ==
- History of the Korean Americans in Los Angeles
- Korean Bell of Friendship

== Further reading/viewing ==
- Nancy Abelmann and John Lie, Blue dreams: Korean Americans and the Los Angeles riots (1997)
- H.C. Laux and G. Theme, "Koreans in Greater Los Angeles: socioeconomic polarization, ethnic attachment, and residential patterns," in W. Li, ed. From urban enclave to ethnic suburb: New Asian communities in Pacific Rim countries (U of Hawaii Press, 2006) pp 95–118
- Lee, Dong Ok. "Responses to Spatial Rigidity in Urban Transformation: Korean Business Experience in Los Angeles," International Journal of Urban & Regional Research, March 1995, Vol. 19 Issue 1, pp 40–54
- Light, Ivan and Edna Bonacich. Immigrant Entrepreneurs: Koreans in Los Angeles, 1965–1982 (1989).
- Youngmin Lee and Kyonghwan Park, "Negotiating hybridity: transnational reconstruction of migrant subjectivity in Koreatown, Los Angeles," Journal of Cultural Geography, Oct 2008, Vol. 25 Issue 3, pp 245–262
- Kim, Katherine Yungmee, "Los Angeles's Koreatown" (2010)
- "Koreatown – Visiting (102) – Huell Howser Archives at Chapman University". Visiting... with Huell Howser. Episode 102.
