= Consulate-General of China, Los Angeles =

Diplomatic representation of China to the United States of America

Coordinates: 34.065727°N 118.290100°W

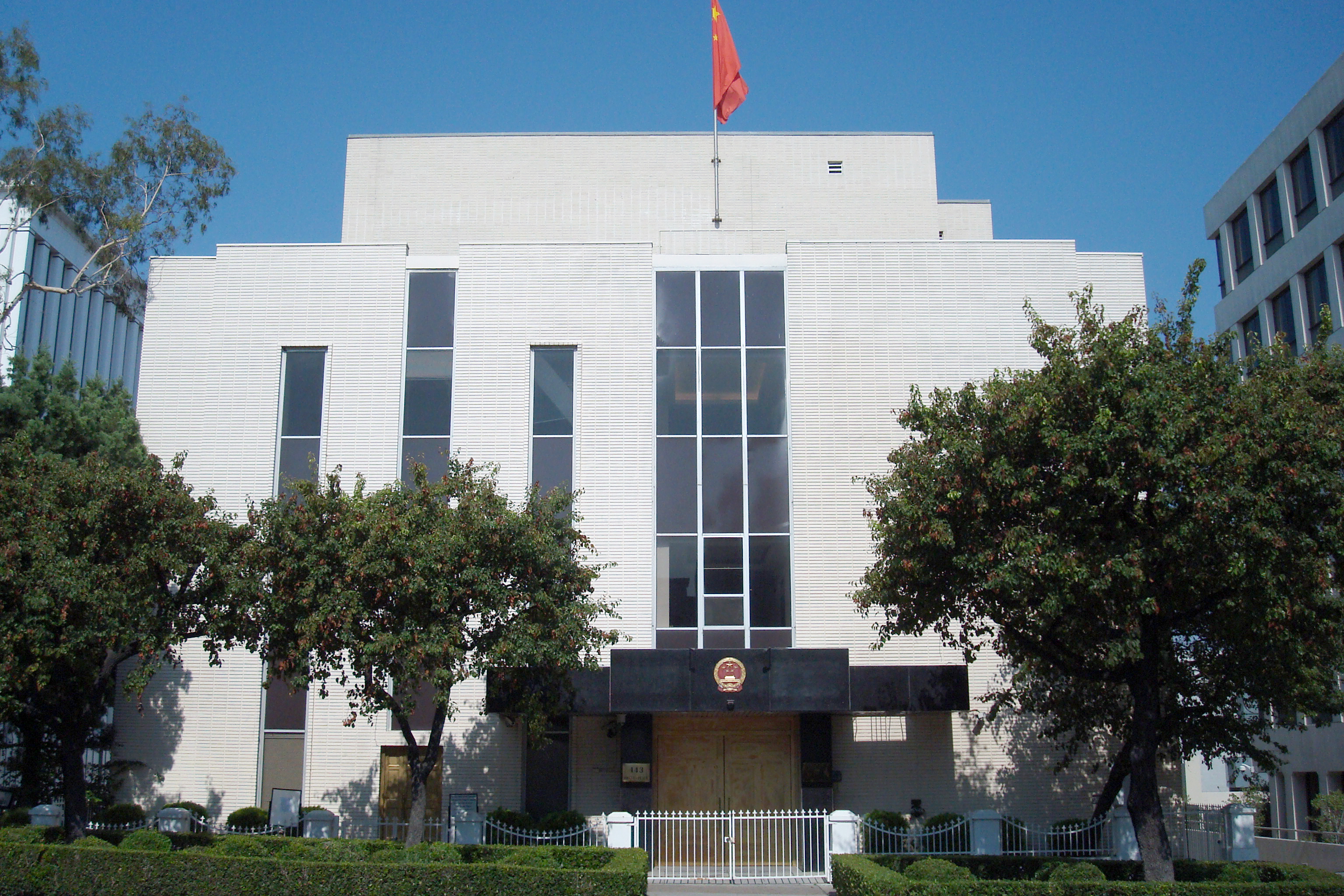
- Simplified Chinese: 中华人民共和国驻洛杉矶总领事馆
- Traditional Chinese: 中華人民共和國駐洛杉磯總領事館
- Literal meaning: Consulate-General of the People's Republic of China in Los Angeles
Transcriptions
Standard Mandarin
- Hanyu Pinyin: Zhōnghuá Rénmín Gònghéguó zhù Luòshānjī Zǒnglǐngshìguǎ

The Consulate-General of the People's Republic of China in Los Angeles is the People's Republic of China's (PRC) diplomatic mission headquartered at 443 Shatto Place in the Koreatown neighborhood of Los Angeles, California, United States. The passport and visa office is on the third floor of 500 Shatto Place, Los Angeles, California. The consulate's service area is Southern California (as defined by the PRC; Northern California is served by The Consulate General of The People's Republic of China in San Francisco), Arizona, Hawaii, New Mexico, and the U.S. Pacific territories.

== History ==
In 1987, China and the United States reached an agreement that each would open a fifth consular mission in the other's country, which led to the opening of the Los Angeles mission and was intended to result in the opening of the U.S. Consulate General in Wuhan.

Liu Jian is the Consul General the People's Republic of China in Los Angeles. In 2013, he succeeded Zhang Yun, who led the consular mission from 2007 until 2013.

In 2020, Uyghur protesters outside the consulate were joined by activists representing Tibet, Taiwan, and Hong Kong.

=== Shooting incidents ===
On December 16, 2011, a man fired bullets from a 9 mm handgun into the Chinese consulate, intending to kill a security guard with whom he earlier had a dispute during a protest. Although there were 20 people in the consulate at the time of the shooting, the assailant missed his target and no one was injured. The man subsequently drove away in his car before turning himself in to police. He was identified as a 67-year-old activist from Shanghai, who was part of a group protest, at the consulate, against China's human rights record. On December 19, 2011, he was charged with two felonies: "assault with a semiautomatic firearm" and "shooting at an inhabited dwelling".

On August 1, 2017, a man fired at least 17 shots into the front of the building, leaving numerous bullet holes in the windows and facade. He then committed suicide with a gunshot to the head.

== In popular culture ==
- A different version of the PRC consulate is seen in the 1998 film Rush Hour where a diplomat's daughter was kidnapped by a group of triads.

== See also ==
- Diplomatic missions of the People's Republic of China
