= Robert F. Kennedy Community Schools =

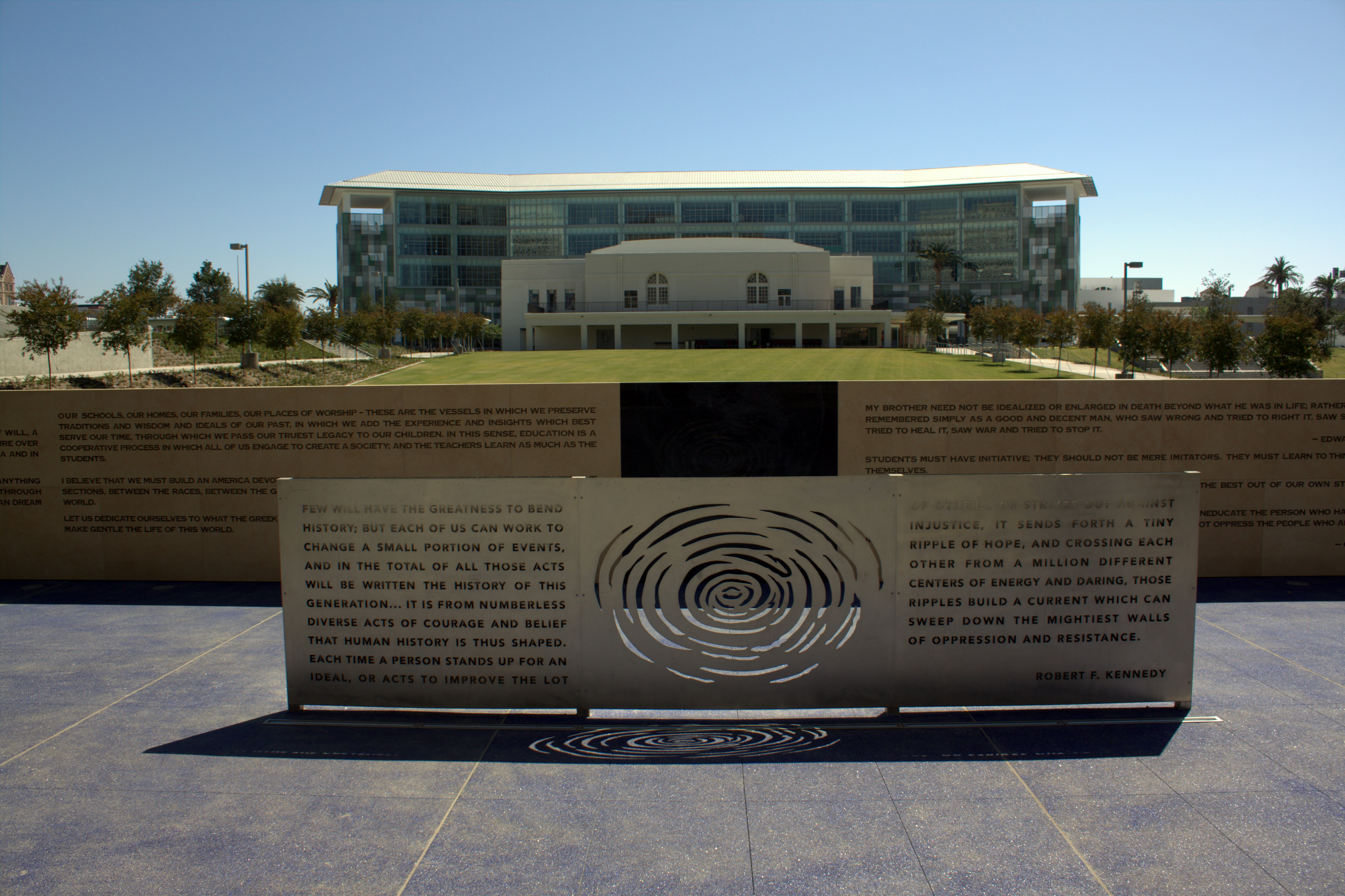

Location
- 701 S. Catalina St. Los Angeles, Los Angeles, California 90005; United States; 34.059466°N 118.296586°W

Information
- Type: Public
- Established: September 2010
- School district: Los Angeles Unified School District
- Principal: Depends on the academy
- Grades: K-12
- Campus: Urban
- Color
- Website: rfkcos.lausd.org

The Robert F. Kennedy Community Schools, called the RFK Community Schools, is a complex of public schools in Los Angeles, California. This was formerly the site of the Ambassador Hotel, the site of the June 1968 assassination of presidential candidate United States Senator Robert F. Kennedy.

The school was designed for 4,200 students, which can be filled by students within a nine-block radius. The schools cost $578 million to build, making it the most expensive public school in the United States.

== History and construction ==
The site was home to the Ambassador Hotel, the site of the June 1968 assassination of presidential candidate, United States senator from New York, and former U.S. Attorney General Robert F. Kennedy.

Los Angeles Unified School District (known as LAUSD) had wanted to build a school on the site since the 1980s, but was met with resistance: real estate developer Donald Trump wanted to build the world's tallest building on the site, and Mayor Tom Bradley, Nate Holden, and LA's business community were strongly opposed to using the location as a school.

The hotel was razed in 2006. The new school, designed by the architects of Gonzalez Goodale, built a modern interpretation of the original hotel.

Along Wilshire Boulevard is a memorial pocket park to Robert F. Kennedy. The school itself is six stories, with a replica of the Cocoanut Grove nightclub.

The Los Angeles Conservancy fought the construction of RFK Community Schools for a long time. They had proposed a plan for a “small learning community” that would still preserve the Ambassador Hotel. On October 25, 2007, the Los Angeles Conservancy filed a lawsuit against LAUSD. The school board was not following the guidelines for construction that the LA Conservancy had expected. After the decision was voted on by the Board of Education, the president of the LA Conservancy stated that while the Ambassador Hotel was not saved, an agreement had been reached with LAUSD to preserve many other historical sites.

The complex features fine art murals and a marble memorial depicting the complex's namesake, a public park, a swimming pool and preservation of pieces of the original hotel. The site of the ballroom where Kennedy gave his last speech is now occupied by a school library, while the location of the pantry where he was fatally wounded is now a storage room.

Originally designed as a large comprehensive K-12 school that would have over 2,400 students, in 2008 LAUSD Local District 4 determined the facility would host wall-to-wall pilot schools – innovative small schools that have charter-like autonomy over their budget, curriculum and assessment, governance, schedule and staffing, but are part of the public school system.

Each pilot school has a social justice mission.

The commission's major recommendation called for a social justice theme to permeate the curriculum, extending from kindergarten through high school, that would reflect Senator Kennedy's commitment throughout his public life.

The five pilot high schools share the same athletic program and compete in high school sports as the RFK Bobcats.

== Reception ==
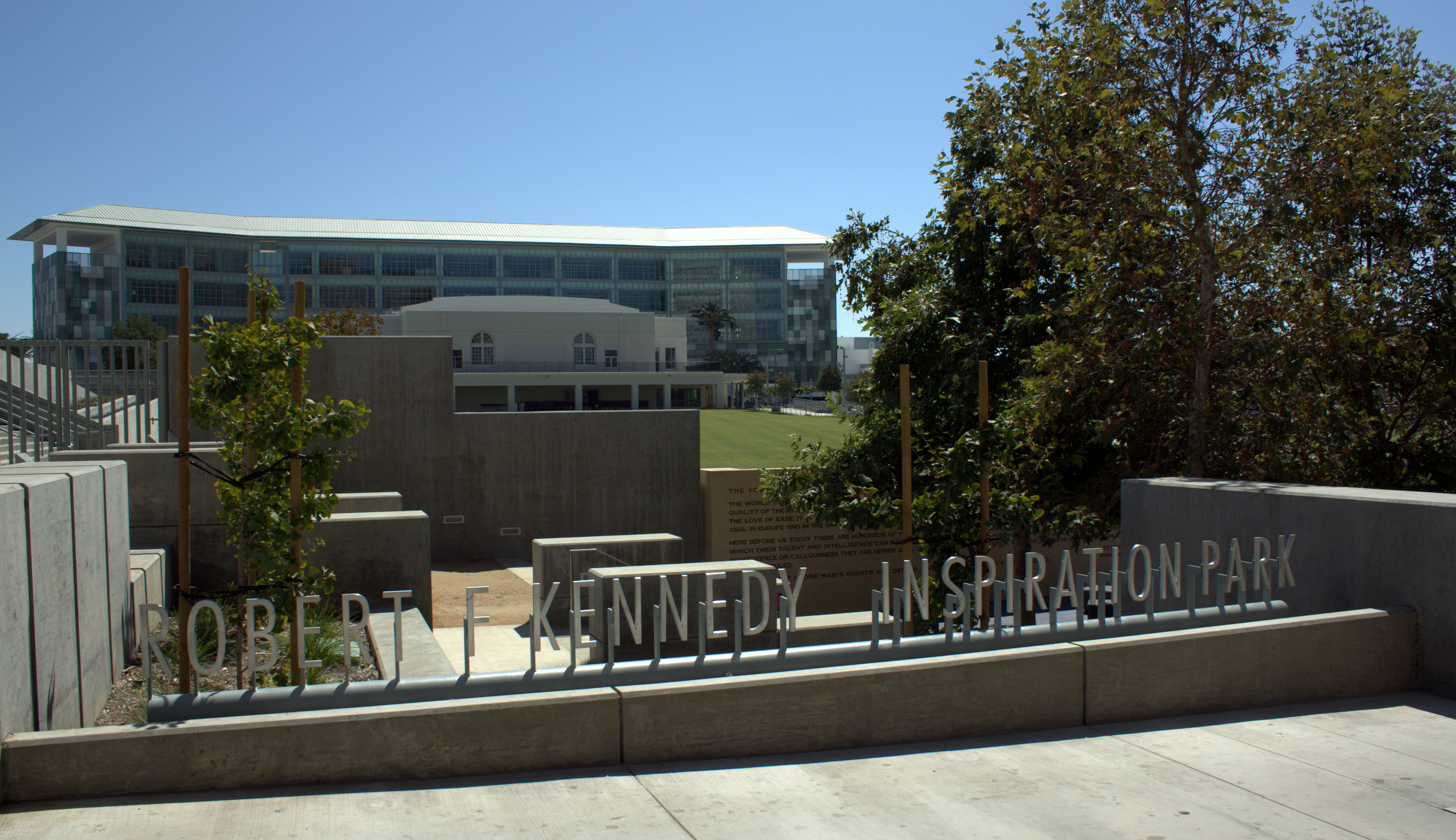
Robert F. Kennedy Inspiration Park along Wilshire Boulevard

The school features a marble memorial depicting Robert F. Kennedy, a manicured public park, and a state-of-the-art swimming pool. Of these amenities, Ben Austin, executive director of Parent Revolution who sits on the California Board of Education, stated, "New buildings are nice, but when they're run by the same people who've given us a 50 percent dropout rate, they're a big waste of taxpayer money... Parents aren't fooled."

An Associated Press article called it a "Taj Mahal" school and reflected, "nearly 3,000 teachers have been laid off over the past two years, the academic year and programs have been slashed. The district also faces a $640 million shortfall and some schools persistently rank among the nation's lowest performing."

Sam Lubell of The Architect's Newspaper commented, "the overall design is not really rooted in anything except maybe the city’s obsession with loosely recreating the past," and "If anything it's a painful reminder of what was there before; an authentic piece of LA history that's been replaced by a loose nod to it. Much of its neighborhood, which was once one of Hollywood's most electric areas, has the same feeling."

This state-of-the-art facility consists of six different schools ranging from kindergarten to twelfth grade and enrolls 4,260 students. The construction cost per seat was $135,000. This was 40 percent higher than the other schools that were constructed in the central Los Angeles area over the past two years. While the school is the most expensive in LAUSD and the nation, the most expensive school per seat in LAUSD is the High School for the Visual and Performing Arts.

== Schools ==
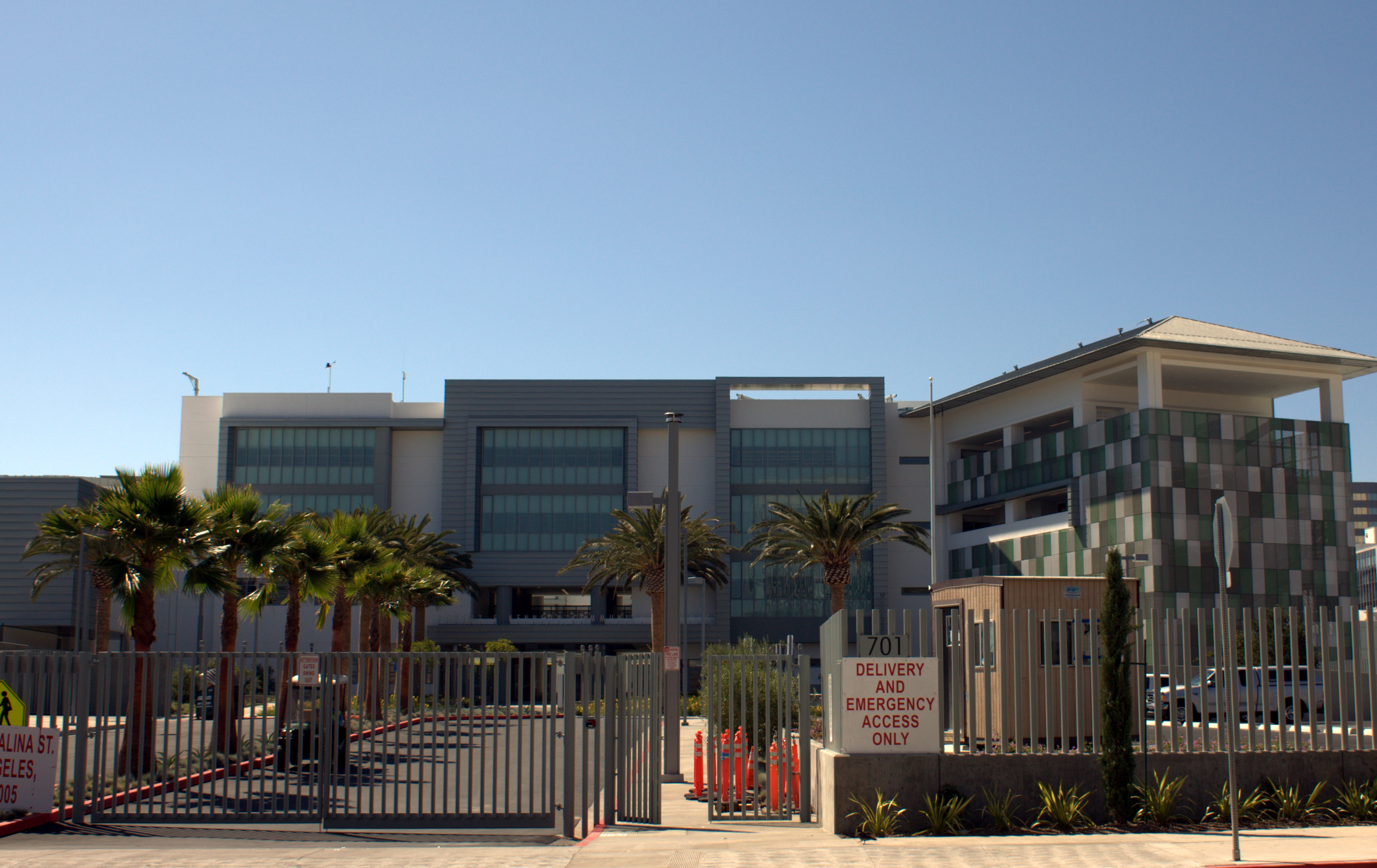
Main entrance to school on Catalina Street

- Ambassador School of Global Education (ASGE), Grades K-5
- Ambassador School of Global Leadership (ASGL), Grades 6-12
- Los Angeles High School of the Arts (LAHSA), Grades 9-12
- New Open World Academy (NOW), Grades K-12
- School for the Visual Arts & Humanities (SVAH), Grades 9-12
- UCLA Community School (UCLA-CS), Grades K-12
