= Xi'an International Studies University =

Provincial public university in Xi'an, Shaanxi, China

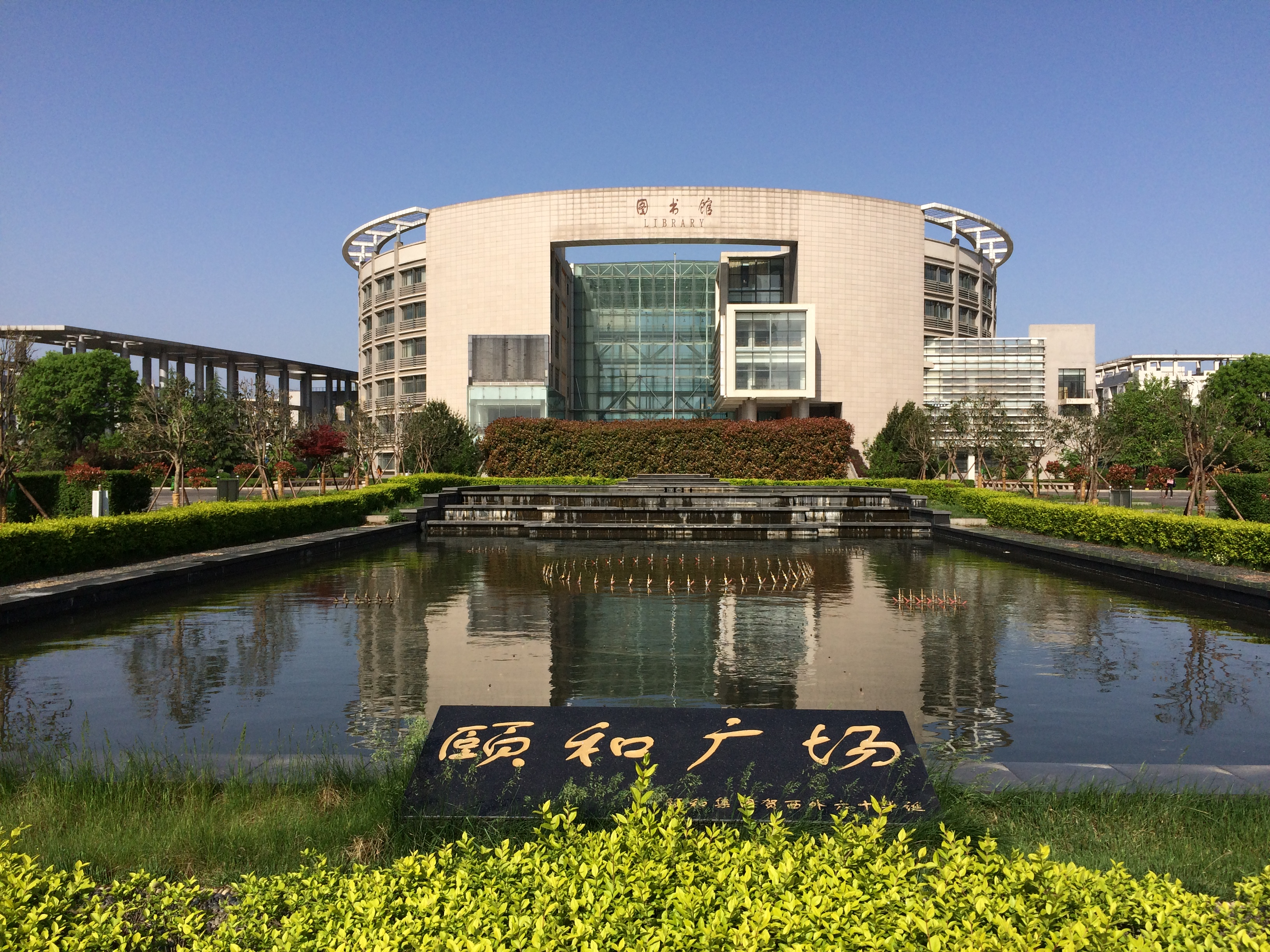
Library of XISU (Chang'an campus)

Xi'an International Studies University (XISU; Chinese: 西安外国语大学; lit. 'Xi'an Foreign Languages University') is a provincial public linguistics university located in Xi'an, Shaanxi, China. The university is affiliated with and funded by the Province of Shaanxi.

XISU is one of the universities with well-known foreign language departments and a member of G8 Universities (G8 refers to the Group of Eight Universities of Foreign Languages and International Studies in China, who have the academic specialisation in Foreign Language teaching and International Studies). The university has three campuses, the north Yanta campus (old campus), the South Chang'an campus (in Xi'an University City) and Yahe campus, where the university's high school is located.

== History ==
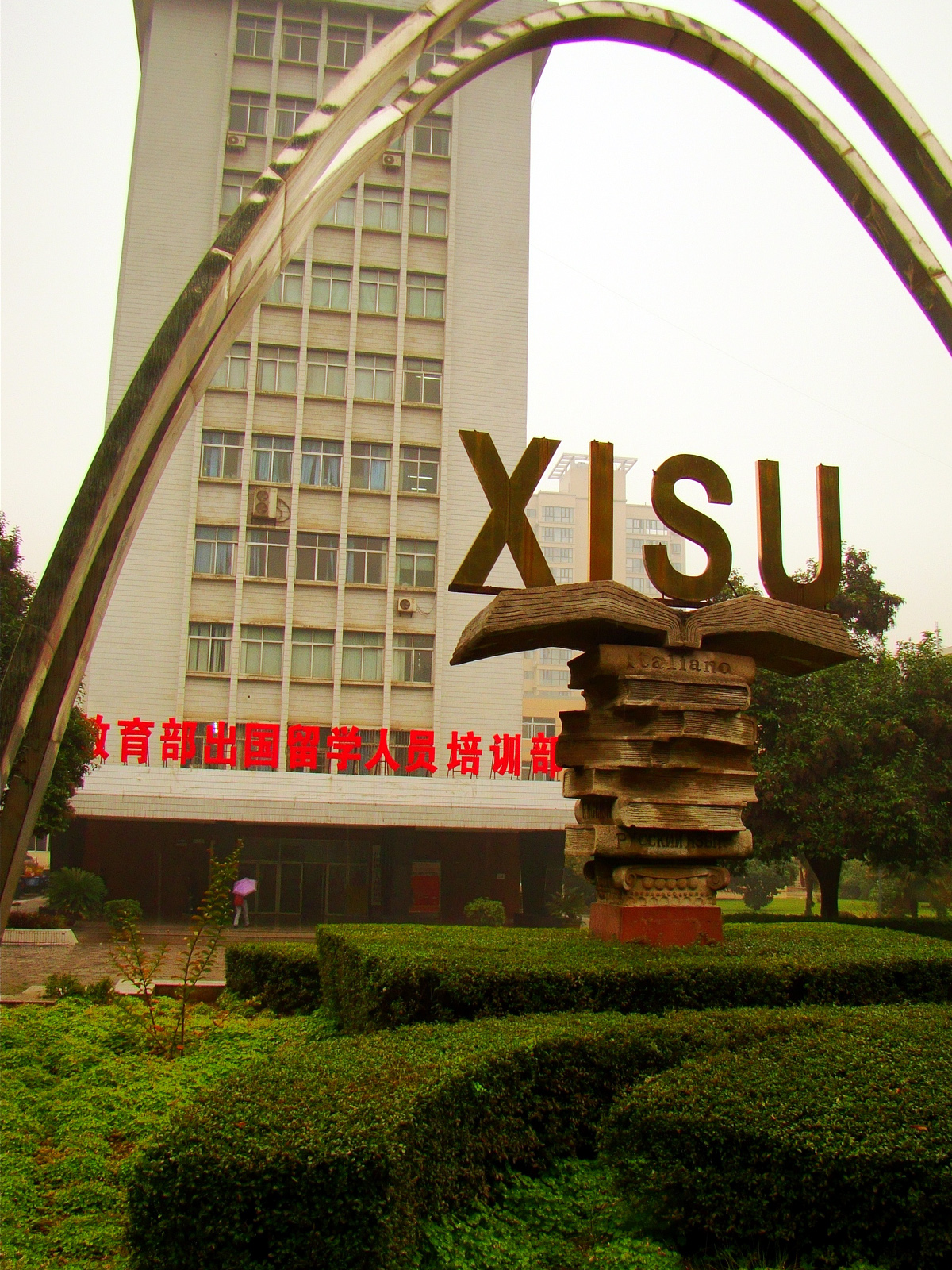
Main entrance

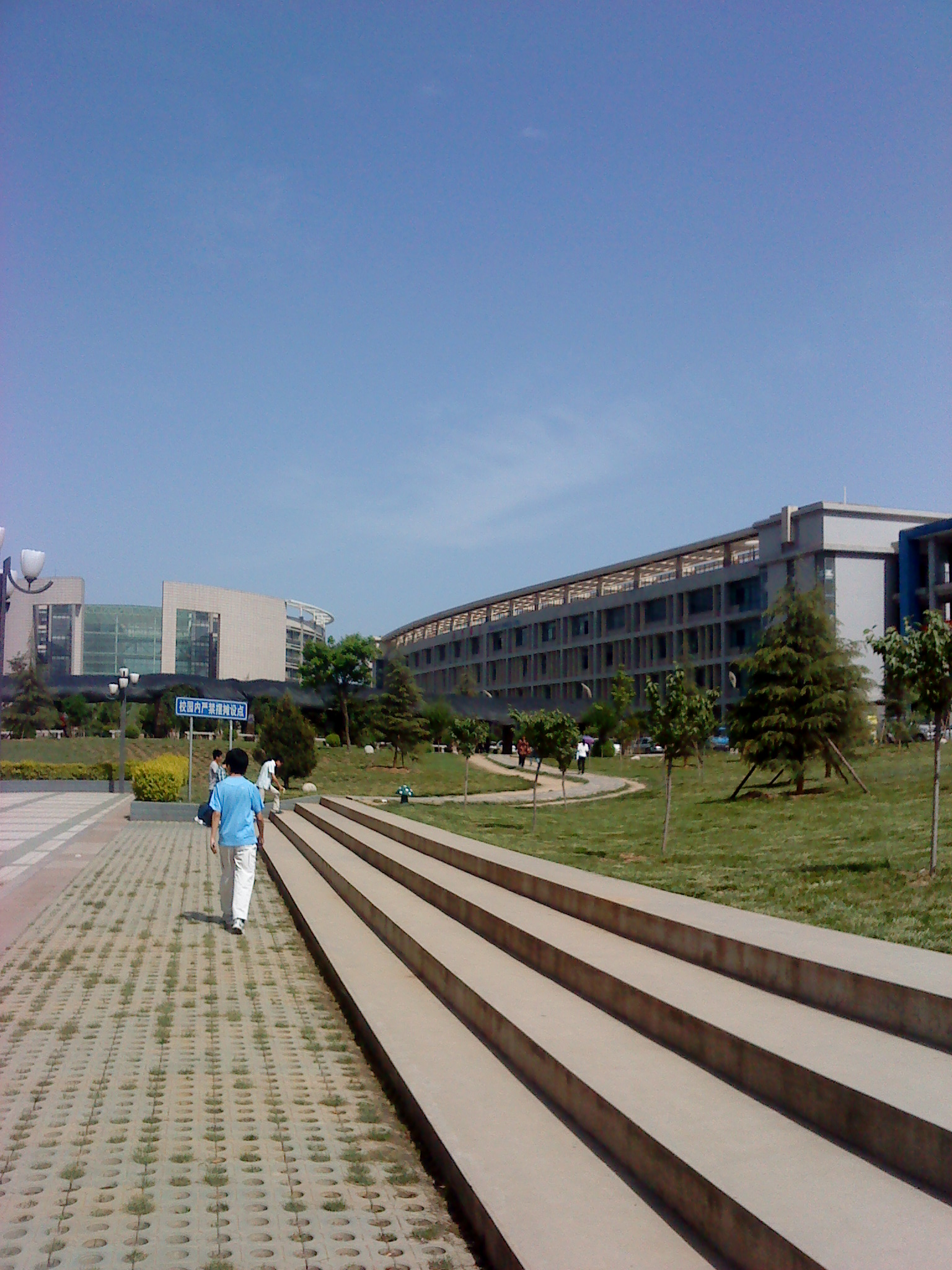
XISU Chang'an campus

Established in 1952 as the Northwest College of Russian and later Xi'an Foreign Languages Institute, XISU is one of the four oldest foreign language teaching institutions in P. R. China (the other three located in Beijing, Shanghai and Chongqing, that was a part of Sichuan). and the only international studies-based university in the northwest region of the country, covering a large geographical area spanning from Shaanxi to Xinjiang. In 1958, it was renamed Xi'an Foreign Languages Institute, and in 1979, the university initiated graduate programs in Linguistics and Literature. In 1995, it merged Shaanxi Foreign Language School, which is its current Yanta campus and, in 2005, the Chang'an campus was completed. Approved by the MOE (Ministry of Education), it was renamed Xi'an International Studies University in 2006.

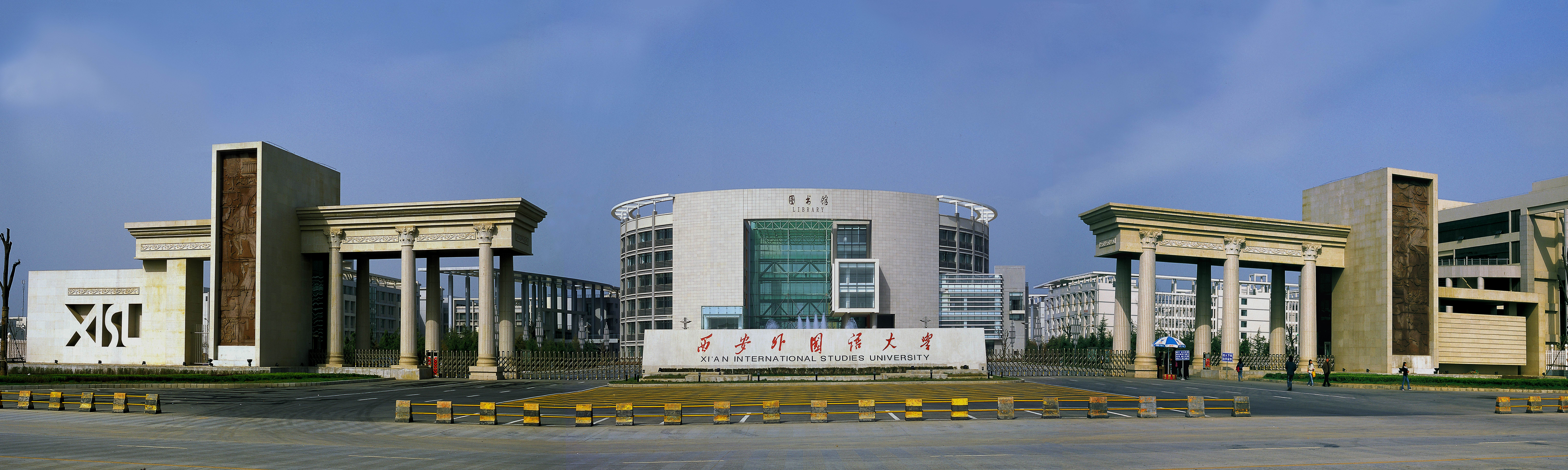
XISU-The Gate of South Campus

Currently, XISU offers its 24,000 students 43 undergraduate degree programs, with the humanities as the core of its curriculum while covering other areas such as social sciences, business, law, tourism, international relations, mass communication and education.

- At the graduate level, XISU offers 26 Master of Arts programs, with majors in linguistics, literature, cross-cultural communication, translation studies, business, tourism and teaching Chinese to speakers of other languages. Besides the Ph.D. programs jointly offered with other three institutions in France and Germany, XISU has been approved by the central government to offer its own Ph.D. programs in linguistics and literature and began enrolling students in 2014.

=== Development phase ===
The university experienced three phases of development in its history. During the first one, from 1952 to 1958, the academy produced many Russian graduates who were the main force in the early construction of new China.

The second one was from 1958 to 2006 when the institution used the name of Xi'an Foreign Languages Institute. During this period, the institute experienced dramatic progress in its development with the introduction of undergraduate majors in English, German, Russian, French, Italian, Spanish, Portuguese, Japanese, Arabic, Korean, Hindi, and Thai at different times after the Cultural Revolution, and with the Education Ministry's approval master's degree programs in English, Russian, French, German, and Japanese.

The current and ongoing phase began in 2006 when the Education Ministry upgraded the institute to a university, because of its comprehensive majors and minors, and its academic force. Several generations of people at XISU started from scratch and forged ahead with enterprise, creating a success story of perseverance. XISU is a highly recognized foreign studies university, with a salient focus on Literature, Economics, Management, Law, Education, Science and Art. It is an important base for foreign language education and teacher development, playing an irreplaceable role in the country's northwest and enjoying a positive reputation in the world.

== Faculty ==
Now the university has 30 academic schools, colleges, and departments with 41 majors and 7 minors. It has 19 graduate programs of different foreign languages. It is now considered by many to be one of the top five foreign language universities in China.

There are also 25 centers in fields such as foreign languages and literature, foreign language and teaching, human geography, bilingual dictionary compiling and editing.

== Students ==
Presently there are about 24,000 students studying in the university. Its graduates are well recognized in terms of “foreign language competence, interpersonal skills, work adaptability, professionalism and great potentialities”, thus ushering in a good influx of job opportunities. Alumni of XISU work all over the world, mostly in education. Many of them are working at universities in the U.S., England, Japan, Germany, and France. The university has established cooperative programs such as exchange programs with faculty, administrators, and students with most countries.

== International exchange ==
It places stress on international cooperation and exchange, opening up to the global context of education. To date, it maintains close scholarly ties with 157 institutions of higher learning in the world, conducts a Confucius Institute in Kazakhstan and Argentina respectively, delivers dual-campus PhD, MA and BA programs in collaboration with seventy-two overseas universities, and runs several internship bases in the US, Singapore, Thailand, France and the UK.

== Motto ==
The current motto of Xi'an International Studies University is '爱国 勤奋 博学 创新', which translates into 'Patriotism Diligence Education and Innovation'.

== List of presidents ==
1. Sun Tianyi, 1986–1998
2. Du Ruiqing, 1998–2005
3. Hu Sishe, 2005–2014
4. Liu Yuelian, 2014–2015
5. Wang Junzhe, 2015–2020
6. Wang Qilong, 2020-2024(Acting President)
7. Wu Yaowu, 2024-now
