= China–Syria relations =

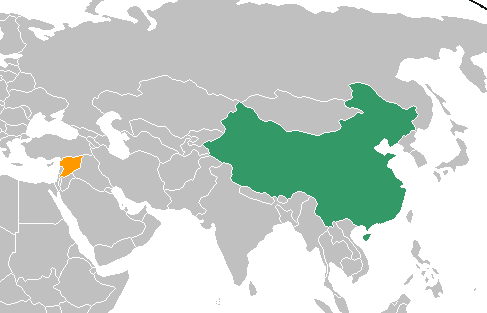
- China: Syria

Diplomatic mission
- Embassy of China in Damascus: Embassy of Syria in Beijing

Envoy
- Ambassador Shi Hongwei and Special Envoy on the Middle East Zhai Jun: Ambassador Mohammad Hassaneh Khalil Haddam

Diplomatic relations between the People's Republic of China (PRC) and the Second Syrian Republic were established on 1 August 1956. The PRC has an embassy in Damascus and Syria has an embassy in Beijing. The PRC supported Ba'athist Syria, but following the Syrian civil war, has maintained a cautious relationship with the Syrian transitional government, citing the presence of Uyghur fighters in the country.

== Diplomatic ties ==
The First Syrian Republic did not recognize the People's Republic of China when it was founded in 1949. Following the Bandung Conference in 1955 their diplomatic relations improved which led to the sign of trade agreements. In 1956, the Second Syrian Republic established a formal diplomatic relationship with the PRC, becoming the second Arab country to do so. The relationship between China and Ba'athist Syria during the Cold War was grounded in the two countries support for the Non-Aligned Movement and their opposition to what they viewed as Western imperialism.

In 2004, Syrian President Bashar al-Assad visited China, the first visit by a Syrian head of state since the establishment of diplomatic relations. During the Syrian civil war, one of China's primary concerns was the involvement of Uyghur militants from Xinjiang. These militants gained combat experience from fighting the Syrian government and other factions. China deems these militants as becoming further radicalized and a potential threat if they return to China.

China–Ba'athist Syria relations
- China: Syria

Diplomatic mission
- Embassy of China in Damascus: Embassy of Syria in Beijing

In addition to more typical diplomatic ties, in the early stages of the Syrian civil war, China's Special Envoy on the Middle East Issue Wu Sike dealt with Syrian issues. His successor Gong Xiaosheng continued to make Syrian diplomatic issues a priority until 2016, when China appointed a separate Special Envoy for the Syrian Crisis, Xie Xiaoyan. On 2 September 2019, Zhai Jun was appointed as the Chinese Special Envoy to the Middle East Issue, succeeding Gong Xiaosheng. China engaged in some efforts to facilitate mediation during the Syrian Civil War, primarily through its embassy level officials. High-level diplomatic exchanges between China and Syria during the Civil War were minimal until Wang Yi's July 2021 visit to Syria.

Syria participates in the China-Arab States Cooperation Forum (CASCF), which is the primary multilateral cooperation body between China and the Arab states. Although the Arab states primarily coordinate in CASCF through the Arab League, Syria coordinated individually between 2011 and 2023 due to the suspension of its Arab League membership. In 2023, Syria participated on CASCF summit in Chengdu as member of Arab League for the first time since 2011.

President Assad made his second official visit to China between 21 and 26 September 2023, the first high-level encounter since the civil war. Assad alongside his wife Asma al-Assad attended the opening ceremony of the 19th Asian Games in Hangzhou. The next day he met CCP General Secretary Xi Jinping for in-depth talks, and also led a delegation of Syrian officials to discuss economic relations to rebuild war-torn Syria. Xi said relations between the two countries "have withstood the test of international changes" and China's foreign ministry remarked that Assad's visit will take bilateral relations to a "new level". On 22 September 2023, China and Syria jointly announced the establishment of a strategic partnership.

=== Post-Assad regime ===
After the fall of the Assad regime on 8 December 2024, Syrian President Ahmed al-Sharaa met with China's ambassador to Damascus Shi Hongwei on 22 February 2025. This marked the first official interaction between the two nations since the fall of the Assad regime. In November 2025, Syrian Foreign Minister Asaad al-Shaibani visited China, where he met with Chinese Foreign Minister Wang Yi and Central Political and Legal Affairs Commission Secretary Chen Wenqing. While meeting Wang, al-Shaibani announced that Syria continued to adhere to one China, recognizing the People's Republic of China as the sole legitimate government representing China, including Taiwan. He also praised Xi Jinping's Belt and Road Initiative, Global Development, Security, Civilization, and Governance initiatives, and promised that Syria would not be a source of threat to China and would not let any entity use Syrian territory for actions against Chinese interests. In turn, Wang Yi stated that China recognized the Syrian transitional government as the sole legitimate representative of the Syrian people. China also stated that it continues to recognize Golan Heights as part of Syria's territory. On 22 January 2026, Chinese Foreign Ministry spokesperson Guo Jiakun said that Syria had promised China to not allow groups like East Turkistan Islamic Movement to operate in its territory. China has refused to lift terrorism sanctions on the Syrian transitional government of Ahmed al-Sharaa, citing the issue of Uyghur fighters in Syria.

== Economic relations ==
In 2009, mutual trade between the two countries was worth nearly $2.2 billion according to figures from the International Monetary Fund, and similar trade volumes were expected by the Syrian Ministry of Economy for 2010. The trade, however, is almost entirely one way. Exports from Syria to China made up less than 1 percent of the total trade volume at $5.6 million, while exports from China to Syria were worth $2.2 billion making China Syria's main importer. China is actively involved in Syria's oil industry. China National Petroleum Corporation is a joint venture partner with Syria's national oil company and Royal Dutch Shell in the Al-Furat Petroleum Company, the main oil producing consortium in the country. The Al-Furat consortium produces some 100,000 barrels per day (bpd). Sinochem is another Chinese oil company that has been very active in recent oil exploration tenders. China's CNPC and Sinopec are helping to revive output under rehabilitation contracts for small mature oil fields in Syria.

In 1991 China sold a miniature neutron source reactor called SRR-1 to Syria. In 2015 Syria stated its willingness to send back the uranium to China in the aftermath of its disarmament of its chemical weapons. 10 July 2018, CCP General Secretary Xi Jinping pledged to provide CN¥600 million ($91 million) in financial aid to Jordan, Lebanon, Syria and Yemen, as part of a model "oil and gas plus" to revive economic growth in the Middle East. By 2021, China's share of Syrian exports was minimal. In 2021, China was the second biggest import partner of Syria with a share of 11.1%.

After over a decade of civil war in Syria, the question of who will be in charge of the reconstruction has arisen over and over again (though any practical activity in that direction was suspended during the acute stage of the coronavirus crisis). China's position on this issue can be discerned by looking at its prewar relations with Syria and the way it has behaved during the war. Following the Chinese-led normalisation of ties between Iran, Saudi Arabia and other Arab states of the Persian Gulf in March 2023, and the readmission of Syria to the Arab League, Syria is following the trend to end its isolation from other Middle Eastern and Asian countries and already joined China's Belt and Road Initiative (BRI) in January 2022. After the comprehensive strategic partnership agreement, Sino-Syrian relations will primarily focus on economic cooperation to execute challenging infrastructure projects including electric power generation, gas sector, technology, trade, industries, housing and agriculture in various fields. China will also "support the government's economic, social and infrastructure reconstruction efforts".

== Military relations ==
During World War II, in order to gain backing for China in Muslim countries, Egypt, Syria, and Turkey was visited by Hui Muslim Ma Fuliang (馬賦良) and Uyghur Muslim Isa Yusuf Alptekin in 1939. The Foreign Minister, Prime Minister, and President of Syria met with the Chinese Muslim delegation after they came via Egypt in May 1939. Gandhi and Jinnah met with Ma Fuliang and Isa Alptekin as they denounced Japan.

In 1969, then chief of staff Mustafa Tlass led a military mission to Beijing, and secured weapons deals with the Chinese government. In a move calculated to deliberately antagonize the Soviets to stay out of the succession dispute then going on in Syria, Mustafa Tlass allowed himself to be photographed waving Mao Zedong's Little Red Book, just two months after bloody clashes between Chinese and Soviet armies on the Ussuri river. The Soviet Union then agreed to back down and sell Syria weapons.

In May 1989, Libya has agreed to finance Syria's purchase of M-9 and M-11 missiles from China. In December 1989, it was reported that Syria and China have signed a contract for 140 M-9 and M-11 missiles to Syria for $170 million. Missile sales to Syria were cancelled under U.S. pressure in 1991. In 1992 and 1996, China was reported to be assisting Syrian ballistic missile programs. On 19 October 1999, Defence Minister of China, General Chi Haotian, met with Syrian Defence Minister Mustafa Tlass in Damascus, Syria, to discuss expanding military ties between Syria and China.

In August 2016 Guan Youfei, Director of the Office for International Military Cooperation of China's Central Military Commission, stated that: "The Chinese and Syrian militaries traditionally have a friendly relationship, and the Chinese military is willing to keep strengthening exchanges and cooperation with the Syrian Armed Forces". By 2022, Chinese military advisors were reportedly in Syria to rebuild its military installations and to train their Syrian counterparts on a wide range of weapons purchased from China, including rocket launchers, machine guns and sniper rifles. It also included further cooperation between SSRC and China over Syria's ballistic missile program.

== Security cooperation ==
=== Syrian Civil War ===
Since his appointment to the newly created position in 2016, China's Special Envoy for the Syria Crisis Xie Xiaoyan has focused on diplomatic efforts including: achieving a cease fire, facilitating a political resolution to the conflict, humanitarian assistance, counterterrorism activities, reconstruction, and condemning chemical weapons use. Xie emphasizes the need for a full investigation of alleged chemical weapons use by the Assad government. Xie also states that the world must learn from the experiences of Iraq and Syria and avoid regime change via foreign intervention. As its Special Envoy emphasizes, China's position is that a political solution must be reached that respects Syria's sovereignty and rights to noninterference and nonintervention, consistent with China's Five Principles of Peaceful Coexistence.

China also views counter-terrorism as a major concern to be addressed in the context of the Syrian crisis. In China's view, some of the Syrian opposition groups (for example, the Turkistan Islamic Party) are terrorists. China attributes Xinjiang conflict from 2012 to 2015 as partially due to TIP, particularly via its ties to Uyghurs in Xinjiang. China has framed Russia's military intervention in Syria in terms of counter-terrorism operations.

China has also cooperated with Syria on the issue of Uyghur militants joining the Syrian opposition in fighting Assad's government, with estimates of hundreds to several thousand Uyghur fighters in Syria and some working with Tahrir al-Sham. China has also allegedly increased direct military links to Syria's government, although more discreetly than Russia has done. Although China claims it has no military presence in Syria, there were reports of military cooperation in 2016, 2017, and 2018.

In its position as a permanent member of the UN Security Council, China vetoed ten resolutions regarding Syria between 2010 and 2020, consistent with China's trend towards a more vocal position at the UN regarding matters of sovereignty. Syria under Assad was one of 53 countries that backed the Hong Kong national security law at the United Nations in June 2020. The Assad government supported the Chinese government's persecution of Uyghur Muslims in Xinjiang.

== See also ==
- Ambassador of the People's Republic of China to Syria
- Foreign relations of the People's Republic of China
- Foreign relations of Syria
- Russia–Syria relations
- Daqin
