= China–Turkey relations =

- China: Turkey

Diplomatic mission
- Chinese Embassy, Ankara: Turkish Embassy, Beijing

Envoy
- Ambassador Liu Shaobin: Ambassador Abdulkadir Emin Önen

China–Turkey relations (Chinese: 中国–土耳其关系; pinyin: Zhōngguó-Tǔěrqí Guānxì; Turkish: Çin–Türkiye ilişkileri) are the international relations between the People's Republic of China (PRC) and Turkey. In modern times, official diplomatic relations were established in 1934 between the Republic of China and Turkey. Turkey recognized the PRC on 5 August 1971.

Turkey conforms to the One-China policy and recognizes the PRC as the sole legal representative of China and does not recognize the legitimacy of Republic of China (ROC) based in Taiwan. China has an embassy in Ankara, and a consulate–general in Istanbul whereas Turkey has an embassy in Beijing and consulate–generals in Hong Kong, Chengdu, Guangzhou and Shanghai. China is a founding and the leading member of the Shanghai Cooperation Organization while Turkey is a SCO partner.

== History ==
=== Ancient history ===
Historically, Chinese relations with Turkic nomadic tribes encompassed many different facets that affected their relations, although the relationship by far was mostly described in a negative light. This was stemmed by historical wars between various Chinese dynasties against various Turkic entities by that time, began from the Han–Xiongnu War when the Xiongnu ("Huns"), the ancestors of modern Turkic and Mongolian nomadic tribes, conflicted with Han dynasty.

The conflict between nomadic people, which the Turks were part of, and the Chinese, intensified under the Tang dynasty, when the Tang dynasty launched two punitive expeditions against Turkic people (Tang campaign against the Eastern Turks and Tang campaigns against the Western Turks), as well as the Turks allied with Korean Goguryeo against China. The Tang won both campaigns, and also destroyed Xueyantuo and Uighur Khanate with the help of its allies. On the other hand, China failed to eliminate Turkic resistance, which was detrimental of paving the way to the defeats of the dynasty and Chinese power. During the Battle of Talas, the Turks betrayed the Chinese Empire and joined the Arabs, ultimately expelled the Chinese out of Central Asia.

=== Ottoman relations with the Ming and Qing dynasties ===
In the 16th century, there emerged travelogues of both Ottoman travelers to China, such as the merchant Ali Akbar and Chinese travelers to the Ottoman world, such as the scholar-official Ma Li, often portraying each other's empires as being highly similar to their own. A 16th century Chinese gazetteer, Shaanxi tongzhi, claims that there were Han-Chinese people living in a number of Ottoman controlled towns and cities such as Beirut, Tartus, Konya, and Istanbul.

According to the official history of the Ming dynasty, some self-proclaimed Ottoman envoys visited Beijing to pay tribute to the Ming emperor in 1524. However, these envoys were most likely just Central and Western Asian merchants trying to conduct trade in China, since pretending to be envoys was the only way to enter the Chinese border pass. One of these merchants was Ali Akbar Khitai, who visited the Ming dynasty during the reign of Emperor Zhengde. Ali Akbar later wrote the book Khitay namah and dedicated it to Sultan Suleiman. The Ming Shilu also records Ottoman envoys reaching China in 1423, 1425, 1427, 1443–1445, 1459, 1525–1527, 1543–1544, 1548, 1554, 1559, 1564, 1576, 1581, and 1618. Some of these missions may have been from Uzbekistan, Moghulistan, or Kara Del because the Ottomans were known in China as the rulers of five realms: Turfan, Samarqand, Mecca, Rum and Hami.

According to traders in the Gujarat Sultanate, the Chinese Emperor ordered all Chinese Muslims to read the khutba in the name of the Ottoman Sultan, thus preventing religious disputes from spreading across his territory.

Kaiser Wilhelm II was so alarmed by the Chinese Muslim troops in the Boxer Rebellion that he requested the Caliph Abdul Hamid II of the Ottoman Empire to find a way to stop the Muslim troops from fighting. The Caliph agreed to the Kaiser's request and sent Enver Pasha (not the future Young Turk leader) to Qing China in 1901, but the rebellion had ended by that time.

=== Turkey and Republic of China ===
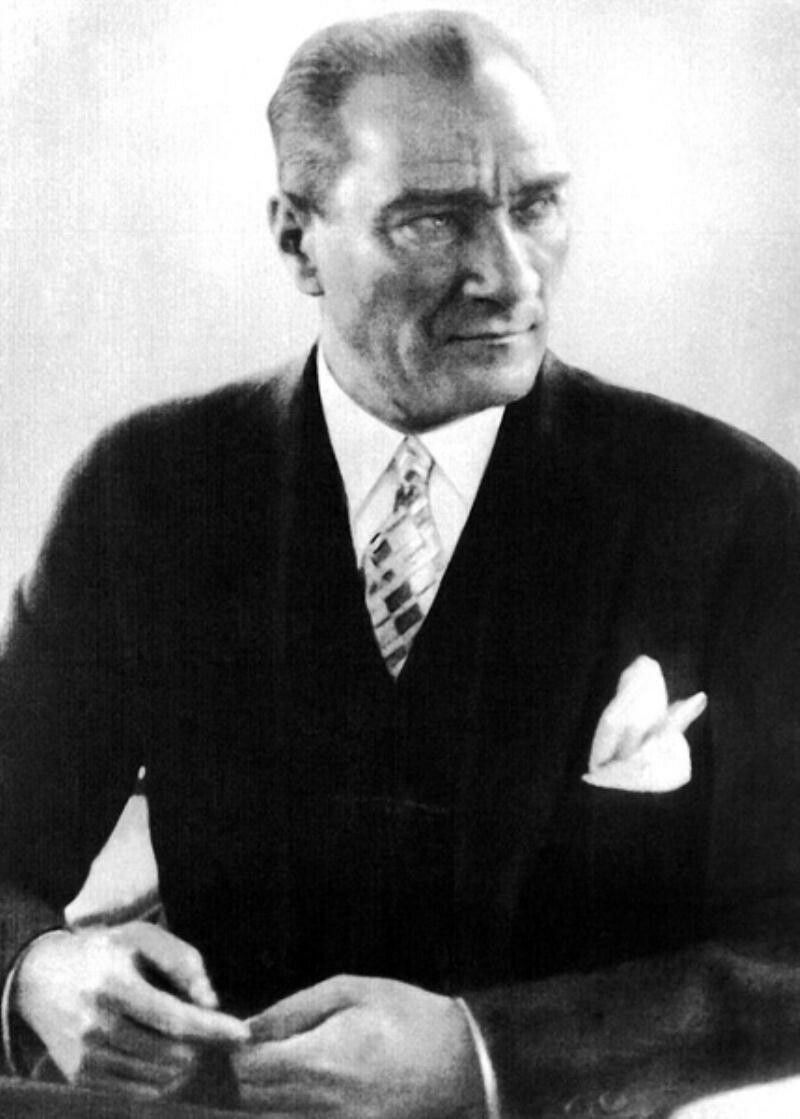
Mustafa Kemal Atatürk, the President of the Republic of Turkey.

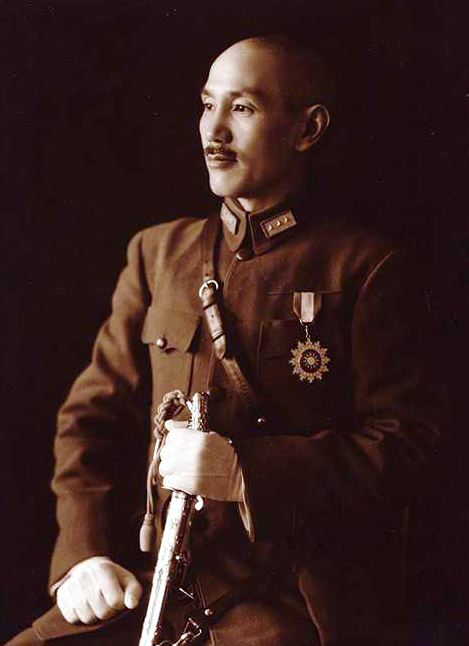
Chiang Kai-shek, the Chairman of National Government of the Republic of China.

Turkish government officials received a Chinese Muslim delegation under Wang Zengshan who denounced the Japanese invasion of China.

=== Turkey and People's Republic of China ===
During the Korean War, the Turkish Brigade under the United Nations Command fought the PRC's People's Volunteer Army at multiple battles, notably the Battle of Wawon and the Third Battle of the Hook.

The People's Republic of China's began its diplomatic representation in Turkey in 1971.

In 1971, Turkey was one of 76 nations voting in favor of United Nations General Assembly Resolution 2758 for the People's Republic of China to be China's representative at the UN, replacing the Republic of China.

On 28 November 2008, Jia Qinglin, the Chinese Communist Party's top political advisor and the Chairman of the Chinese People's Political Consultative Conference, gave an official goodwill visit to Turkey as guest of Turkish Parliament Speaker Köksal Toptan. In Ankara, Jia met Turkish President Abdullah Gül and Prime Minister Recep Tayyip Erdoğan. After visiting Ankara, Jia attended a business forum entitled "Turkish-Chinese Economic and Commercial Opportunities Forum" in Istanbul.

Turkish President Abdullah Gül has become the first Turkish president to visit China in 14 years with his official visit between 24 and 29 June 2009. Gül said one of the major goals of his visit was to boost economic relations. In Beijing, Gül held talks with Chinese leader Hu Jintao and attended a Turkey-China business forum. Following the meetings, seven cooperation agreements were signed between the two countries in the fields of energy, banking, finance and culture. After Beijing, Gül visited Xi'an and he was awarded with an honorary doctorate by the Xian Northwest University. In the third leg of his China trip, Gül visited Shenzhen. Upon an invitation of the Beijing administration, Gül also visited Ürümqi and has become the first Turkish president visiting Xinjiang Uyghur Autonomous Region.

On 7 October 2010, China and Turkey signed eight cooperation agreements relating to trade, cultural and technical exchange, marine cooperation, and other things. At the signing ceremony attended by both of the countries' prime ministers, both pledged to increase bilateral trade to $50 billion by 2015, and to cooperate in building high-speed rail to link Ankara to Istanbul. Later in November, Turkish Foreign Minister Ahmet Davutoğlu toured China for six days and met with his counterpart Yang Jiechi, after Chinese premier Wen Jiabao visited Turkey and upgraded the China–Turkey relationship to a strategic partnership. Among the joint pledges the foreign ministers made in China were to start a Turkish industrial zone in Xinjiang and to jointly crack down on separatism and terrorism, including on anti-China separatist activities in Turkey. Commentators have cited these stronger ties as further proof of a realignment of Turkish foreign policy to the "East".

Cooperation between China and Turkey has intensified since 2016, with the two countries signing ten bilateral agreements on various matters, including nuclear energy and health policy.

In 2017, the Chinese ambassador to Turkey Yu Hongyang said that China is ready to discuss Turkey's membership to the Shanghai Cooperation Organization.

In April 2019, China was the first country to congratulate Ekrem İmamoğlu after he became the mayor of Istanbul. Ekrem İmamoğlu told the Chinese Consul General in Istanbul Cui Wei that the political, economic, trade and cultural relations between China and Turkey are very good and important.

In July 2019, when Turkish President Erdoğan visited China, he said "It is a fact that the people of all ethnicities in Xinjiang are leading a happy life amid China's development and prosperity". Erdoğan also said that some people were seeking to "abuse" the Xinjiang crisis to jeopardize "Turkish-Chinese relationship". Beijing also invited Turkish reporters to tour the Xinjiang re-education camps. The Chinese Communist Party tabloid newspaper Global Times described the camps as a model for counter-terrorism and a "paradise" for the Uyghurs.

China criticized the 2019 Turkish offensive into north-eastern Syria. China's Foreign Ministry spokesperson stated that China held "Syria's sovereignty, independence and territorial integrity must be respected and upheld", noted that several sides had "expressed concerns" over Turkey's military operation and urged Turkey to "exercise restraint".

On 21 November 2022, Qian Hongshan, deputy head of the International Department of the Chinese Communist Party, visited Istanbul to meet with Ünal Çeviköz, an advisor to Republican People's Party (CHP) leader Kemal Kılıçdaroğlu, as well as Yüksel Mansur Kılınç, MP for the CHP from Istanbul.

China offered monetary support to Turkey after the 2023 Turkey–Syria earthquake. and sent additional personnel to Turkey to help in the relief effort. Chinese leader Xi Jinping, said the country would send aid and medics to the affected regions. The government of China has also announced to offer 30 million yuan ($4.4 million) to Syria and 40 million yuan ($5.9 million) to Turkey as emergency humanitarian assistance.

On 14 June 2023, Turkey opened a consulate in Chengdu, its fifth mission in China, as well as the 15th diplomatic mission in the city.

== Economic relations ==
Countries which signed cooperation documents related to the Belt and Road Initiative

In recent years, the economic relationship between Turkey and China have been growing rapidly. In 2000, the total bilateral trade volume between China and Turkey exceeded US$1 billion for the first time. By 2021, bilateral trade between China and Turkey increased to US$35.9 billion. As of 2023, China is Turkey's second biggest import partner, after Russia.

Turkey is an active member of the Belt and Road Initiative, which it joined in 2015. BRI investments in Turkey totaling $4 billion as of summer 2022.

In 2012, China and Turkey established a Turkish lira-Renminbi currency swap agreement. In June 2019, the People's Bank of China transferred $1 billion worth of funds to Turkey to help the Turkish economy. Later in September, China Development Bank granted a $200 million loan to the Industrial and Development Bank of Turkey. In 2021, the value of the swap was increased from $2.4 billion to $6 billion. The two countries renewed the agreement in June 2025, allowing both countries central banks to exchange as much as ₺189 billion liras or ¥35 billion yuan ($4.8 billion) between 2025 and 2028. The two central banks also agreed to establish a Renminbi clearing system in Turkey.

According to a study done in 2020, the increasing economic cooperation between China and Turkey is shaped by interest-driven calculations to bolster AKP's power internally and internationally. In June 2024, Turkey announced a 40 percent tariff on vehicle imports from China, though it announced in July that Chinese companies that invested in Turkey would be exempt from the tariffs. In 2024, Chinese EV company BYD agreed to invest $1 billion to build a factory. In October 2024, China filed a complaint against Turkey at the World Trade Organization over its imported electric vehicle tariff. In March 2025, the Turkish government announced that Chery's partners will make a US$1 billion investment in Samsun, Turkey for a manufacturing plant with a capacity to create produce 200,000 vehicles a year. In January 2026, it was revealed that the Dongfeng Motor Corporation was looking to producing passenger cars in Turkey.

== Cultural relations ==
China and Turkey signed a cultural cooperation agreement in November 1993. The exchange programs include sports, education and news.

2018 was the "Year of Turkey" in China. A song created by Xiao Zhang called "I want to take you to romantic Turkey" became one of the most popular songs in China. During Erdoğan's visit to China in July 2019, General Secretary of the Chinese Communist Party Xi Jinping said that China would make it easier for Turkish nationals to get Chinese visas.

Chinese tourists to Turkey increased from 98 thousand in 2011 to 300 thousand in 2015 and to 400 thousand in 2018, marking a 537% increase in the last 10 years. The Turkish government is expecting this number to go up to 1 million in the following years. In the first eight months of 2019, 292,322 Chinese tourists visited Turkey, marking a 12% increase from last year. In May 2024, Turkey and China signed a memorandum of understanding to expand scheduled passenger flights from 21 to 49 per week. The agreement also allows Turkish Airlines to operate flights to Chengdu, Ürümqi, and Xi’an. In 2024, nearly 410,000 Chinese tourists visited Turkey. On 31 December 2025, Turkey abolished visa requirements for Chinese citizens for tourism and transit for stays of up to 90 days within any 180-day period.

== Military relations ==
Turkey's cooperation with China for the joint development of ballistic missiles began in the late 1990s, when negotiations for the technology transfer and production under license in Turkey of the American M-270 MLRS artillery rocket system failed. After signing a contract for the licensed production of the Chinese WS-1A and WS-1B rockets under the name of Kasırga in 1997, a similar contract was signed with B-611 SRBM system in 1998. Out of this Turkey manufactured the J-600T Yıldırım tactical ballistic missile with Chinese technology.

Chinese Flankers used the Konya facilities to exercise with Turkish F-4E Phantoms between 20 September and 4 October 2010. Turkey does not appear to regard these exercises as part of the official Anatolian Eagle series, despite the media reporting them as such. U.S. officials worried that the exercises would allow the Chinese access to Western technology and an understanding of NATO tactics.

In November 2015, Turkey canceled a HQ-9 missile deal with China, opting instead for a domestically developed missile defence system. It was reported in 2019 that Turkey is considering buying Shenyang J-31 jets from China because the United States banned selling F-35 jets to Turkey.

== Disputes ==
=== Persecution of Uyghurs ===
In 2009, then-prime minister Erdoğan called the Chinese government's repression of Uyghurs a "genocide". Following the July 2009 Ürümçi riots, Erdoğan denounced the "savagery" being inflicted on the Uyghur community and called for an end of the Chinese government's attempts to forcibly assimilate the community. Later at the Group of Eight summit in Italy, Erdogan called upon Chinese authorities to intervene to protect the community and stated that "The incidents in China are, simply put, a genocide. There's no point in interpreting this otherwise." As a result of Erdogan's statements, China's relations with Turkey deteriorated temporarily.

Rebiya Kadeer claimed that Turkey is hampered from offering support to the Uyghurs because of its own Kurdish conflict, which China may interfere with in retaliation. Turkey has officially designated the East Turkistan Islamic Movement as a terrorist organization. In recent years, China and Turkey have increased cooperation against separatist movements in Xinjiang. Turkey has also increased deportations of Uyghurs to China. In February 2019, the Spokesperson of the Turkish Foreign Ministry denounced China for "violating the fundamental human rights of Uyghur Turks and other Muslim communities in the Xinjiang Uyghur Autonomous Region." In May 2020, an extradition treaty between Turkey and China was faced an uncertain path to ratification in the Grand National Assembly of Turkey. The prospect of the extradition treaty's ratification worries Uyghur activists and human rights groups, who fear that the document could negatively affect Uyghurs living in Turkey. In July 2020, The Daily Telegraph reported that Turkey was sending Uyghur human activists to third countries where they could then be extradited to China.

The ruling AKP in Turkey has different factions; some of which are nationalists who want to confront China over its treatment of Uyghurs, and other members who want to prioritize good relations with China and believe that the Uyghur issue is being abused to spoil relations between China and Turkey by the United States. Some Islamist AKP members have accused Rebiya Kadeer of being an "American agent" and "infidel". Turkey has had to follow its own country's interests first with a pragmatic approach to the situation of Turkic peoples in other countries like Uyghurs, Gagauz, and Crimean Tatars. In recent years, those who want to maintain relations with China have gained the upper hand.

In April 2021, the Chinese ambassador to Turkey was summoned after responding to statements by Turkish politicians Meral Akşener and Mansur Yavaş commemorating those killed in the Barin uprising in Xinjiang in 1990.

In 2021, Turkish President Tayyip Erdogan received the first dose of Sinovac's COVID-19 vaccine CoronaVac. But Turkey has been accused of agreeing to hand over Uyghurs to China in exchange for access to its COVID-19 vaccines.

In 2021, Turkish authorities started cracking down on Uyghur protesters in Turkey at the Chinese behest.

On 24 May 2023, during a program with CNN Türk, Turkish interior minister Süleyman Soylu alleged that the US was "using Uyghur organizations in Turkey against China". He further accused the US of "using our Uyghur Turk brothers" to "continue its policy of squeezing China" which he said affects Turkey as well. He also alleged that the US used the Uyghur issue as a domestic political topic in Turkey for a long time, and that after ISIS fighters "left" Syria, "America placed them on a valley between Afghanistan and China, close to where Uyghurs live in China".

In February 2024, Turkish police arrested six individuals for allegedly spying on Uyghurs and passing information along to Chinese intelligence.

On March 5, 2024, Turkey's foreign minister, Hakan Fidan urged Chinese authorities to protect the cultural rights of minority Muslim Uyghurs in China's western Xinjiang province and allow them to “live their values.”

In May 2025, the Turkish National Intelligence Organization (MIT) reportedly dismantled a Chinese cyber-espionage cell in Istanbul, accused of using ghost base stations to collect communication data and user information and conduct surveillance of Turkish public officials and Uyghur Turks.

== See also ==
- Foreign relations of China
- Foreign relations of Turkey
- Göktürk-2
- Chinese people in Turkey
- List of ambassadors of China to Turkey
- List of ambassadors of Turkey to China
