= United States withdrawal from the Iran nuclear deal =

2018 US withdrawal from the Iran nuclear deal

On 8 May 2018, the United States under the first Trump administration announced its withdrawal from the Iran nuclear deal, formally known as the Joint Comprehensive Plan of Action (JCPOA). The JCPOA is an agreement on Iran's nuclear program reached in July 2015 by Iran and the P5+1 or the E3+3 and the European Union.

In a joint statement responding to the U.S. withdrawal, the leaders of France, Germany, and the United Kingdom said that the United Nations Security Council resolution endorsing the nuclear deal remained the "binding international legal framework for the resolution of the dispute". Various countries, international organizations, and U.S. scholars have expressed regret about or criticized the withdrawal, while U.S. conservatives, Israel, Saudi Arabia, and their allies have supported it. The withdrawal caused concern in Iran due to its impact on the economy.

On 17 May 2018, the European Commission announced its intention to implement the blocking statute of 1996 to declare U.S. sanctions against Iran illegal in Europe and ban European citizens and companies from complying with them. The commission also instructed the European Investment Bank to facilitate European companies' investment in Iran.

The withdrawal led Iran to take actions contrary to the deal, including stockpiling roughly 440 kilograms of highly enriched uranium. Amid negotiations on a potential nuclear deal, Israel and the United States under the second Trump administration launched the 2026 Iran war, citing the Iranian nuclear threat as a rationale.

== Background ==
In July 2015, China, the European Union, France, Germany, Iran, Russia, the United Kingdom, and the United States concluded an agreement, the Joint Comprehensive Plan of Action (JCPOA), which provided that Iran's nuclear activities would be limited in exchange for reduced sanctions. According to the JCPOA, every 90 days the president of the United States would certify that Iran was adhering to the terms of the agreement, among other things. Leading up to the United States' withdrawal, the IAEA asserted that its inspectors had verified that Iran had implemented its nuclear-related commitments to the agreement. In a letter to then-congressman Mike Pompeo, U.S. State Department assistant secretary for legislative affairs Julia Frifield wrote that the agreement was a political commitment between the parties, "not a treaty or an executive agreement". The JCPOA ended some of the sanctions on Iran while suspending others, subject to waivers, including those of oil sanctions implemented in January 2012, which require periodic recertification.

During his 2016 U.S. presidential election campaign, Donald Trump made the renegotiation of the JCPOA one of his main foreign affairs campaign promises, saying at a rally that it would "be a totally different deal" if he won. Trump called the deal a disaster, "the worst deal ever", so terrible that it could lead to "a nuclear holocaust".

The Trump administration issued certifications in April and July 2017 that Iran was complying with the deal. But in October 2017, Trump announced that the US would not make the certification provided for under the Iran Nuclear Agreement Review Act of 2015, saying that the suspension of sanctions was not "proportionate and appropriate".

In October 2017, the Chinese state-run newspaper Global Times wrote that America's reputation as a major power would be undermined in the world's eyes if it reneged on a deal simply because of a transition in government. In May 2018, French president Emmanuel Macron warned Trump not to withdraw from the deal, telling Der Spiegel that doing so could lead to war.

In an August 2017 National Review article, former US ambassador to the UN John Bolton supported complete withdrawal from the JCPOA and rejected the idea that it could be fixed. As National Security Advisor, he pressed the president to withdraw from the JCPOA. In May 2018, Israeli prime minister Benjamin Netanyahu gave a presentation at the Israel Ministry of Defense titled "Iran Lied", which some analysts believed influenced Trump to pursue withdrawal. Trump announced just over a week later that the US would withdraw from the deal, calling the Iranian promises a lie. Jarrett Blanc, an Obama administration official, said after the withdrawal that the JCPOA had no formal provisions for withdrawal since it was an agreement between several countries, not a treaty, but a member of the deal could stop complying with its obligations.

According to the International Atomic Energy Agency, Iran was in compliance with the JCPOA and there was no evidence otherwise. But David Makovsky, a Middle East scholar at the Washington Institute for Near East Policy, said that based on Netanyahu's evidence, Iran had not revealed all its research into nuclear weapons and thus was not in compliance.

== Announcement ==
President Trump announces United States withdrawal from the JCPOA on May 8, 2018.

At 2:00 p.m. Eastern Standard Time, Trump announced that the United States would withdraw from the Joint Comprehensive Plan of Action. He called the agreement "a horrible one-sided deal that should have never, ever been made" and added, "[i]t didn't bring calm, it didn't bring peace, and it never will."

== Reactions ==
=== Support ===
- United States:
  - The Republican Party (GOP) supported Trump's decision to withdraw.
  - US ambassador to the United Nations Nikki Haley said that Trump "absolutely made the right decision".
  - Secretary of State Mike Pompeo supported the withdrawal.
  - National Security Adviser John Bolton supported the decision.
  - Former vice president Dick Cheney supported the withdrawal.
- Saudi Arabia: Saudi Arabia supported and welcomed Trump's decision and "supports reinstating economic sanctions on the Iranian regime, which have been suspended under the nuclear deal", according to the official SPA news agency.
- Israel: Prime Minister Benjamin Netanyahu, in a live televised address shortly after the announcement of U.S. withdrawal, said, "Israel fully supports President Trump’s bold decision today to reject the disastrous nuclear deal with the terrorist regime in Tehran."

=== Opposition ===
- United Nations:
  - Secretary-General António Guterres said he is "deeply concerned by [the] announcement that the United States will be withdrawing from the Joint Comprehensive Plan of Action (JCPOA) and will begin reinstating US sanctions".
- United States:
  - The Democratic Party criticized Trump's decision to withdraw.
  - Former president Barack Obama said "the deal was working and it was in US interests."
  - Former secretary of state John Kerry said that the US should have preserved the deal.
  - Former national security advisor Susan Rice said it was a "foolish decision".
  - Former secretary of energy Ernest Moniz said the withdrawal was a "major strategic mistake".
  - Former deputy secretary of energy Elizabeth Sherwood-Randall said the decision was "a reckless strategic mistake of immense consequence".
  - Former ambassador to NATO Nicholas Burns said the disavowal was "reckless and one of the most serious mistakes of his presidency".
  - Former NSA director, former CIA director, retired USAF four-star general Michael Hayden said that "Iran is further away from a weapon with this deal than they would be without it".
  - Senator from Vermont Bernie Sanders criticized the decision: "Trump's speech today was the latest in a series of reckless decisions that move our country closer to conflict."
  - Harvard political scientist Gary Samore said that if "President Trump thinks he can crash the nuclear deal, reimpose international economic sanctions, and force Iran to negotiate a better deal, he is mistaken".
  - Harvard political scientist Graham T. Allison said that it was "a bad choice for the U.S. and bad choice for our ally Israel".
  - Harvard political scientist Matthew Bunn said that Trump had freed Iran to build up its ability to make nuclear bomb material.
  - Harvard political scientist Stephen Walt said it was Trump's "most consequential foreign-policy blunder".
  - Former secretary of state Colin Powell reiterated his longstanding support for the Iran Nuclear Deal, 5/16/2018
- Iran: In an official statement, the Ministry of Foreign Affairs declared that they were extremely concerned that the United States was repeatedly acting contrary to the opinion of the majority of states and exclusively in its own narrow-minded and opportunistic interests, in flagrant violation of international law.
- European Union:
  - A Declaration by the High Representative on behalf of the EU "deeply regrets the announcement by US President Trump to withdraw from the Joint Comprehensive Plan of Action".
    - Even though The European Council on Foreign Relations does not take collective positions, several of its Council Members have signed a European Joint Call on the US to "reconsider its approach to the JCPOA".
- China: China's Special Envoy on the Middle East Issue, Gong Xiaosheng stated that the People's Republic of China would continue to preserve and implement the comprehensive agreement on Iran's nuclear program, saying that 'dialogue is better than confrontation'.
- France:
  - Former French president François Hollande said that Donald Trump's personality was driven by "its cynicism, its vulgarity and its egocentricity" and, therefore, the only thing he wanted was "to tear up the deal".
  - The French minister of foreign affairs, Jean-Yves Le Drian, expressed concern about the political stability of the region, but reaffirmed that the deal was not dead despite the American withdrawal.
  - Former French minister of foreign affairs Laurent Fabius said the withdrawal was "extremely dangerous for the stability of the Middle East".
- United Kingdom:
  - Former UK prime minister David Cameron said that the Iran deal was "so much better" than any alternative.
- Turkey:
  - Speaking to BBC's HARDtalk, Turkish President Recep Tayyip Erdoğan called the U.S. withdrawal problematic and said that "continuity between states is fundamental".
- Austria: Jan Kickert, Austrian permanent representative to the United Nations, denounced as "wrong and unjustifiable" a move by the U.S. administration to decertify Iran's compliance with the Iran deal.
- Finland:
  - In a meeting with Iranian labor minister Ali Rabie, Finnish minister of labor Jari Tapani Lindström said that Finland is still committed to the nuclear deal.
- Portugal:
  - Portugal regrets the USA's rejection of the Iran nuclear deal and Portuguese minister of internal administration Eduardo Cabrita has affirmed that Portugal will continue to respect the agreement.
- Spain:
  - Spain pulled a frigate from U.S. Gulf mission due to differences over Iran, accusing the U.S. government of taking "a decision outside of the framework of what had been agreed with the Spanish Navy".
- Israel: Former Israeli prime minister Ehud Barak said Trump's decision made the world "more uncertain".

== Diplomatic consequences ==
=== Supporting countries ===
- Bahrain's government issued a statement welcoming the withdrawal.
- Egypt supported the withdrawal.
- Israel's prime minister Benjamin Netanyahu called the withdrawal a "brave decision".
- Saudi Arabia's Foreign Ministry stated that "Iran used economic gains from the lifting of sanctions to continue its activities to destabilize the region, particularly by developing ballistic missiles and supporting terrorist groups in the region."
- United Arab Emirates' Foreign Ministry has announced support for the decision.
- Yemen's government announced its full support for the decision.

=== Opposing countries ===
==== Remaining JCPOA participants ====
Khamenei has publicly and repeatedly "banned" any negotiations with the United States

- Iran's Ayatollah Ali Khamenei, the Supreme Leader of Iran, calling Trump's words "cheap and petty", said during a speech: "We kept saying not to trust the US and here is the result.... Aside from at least 10 obvious lies, this person [Trump] threatened the nation of Iran and the Islamic Republic, which I, on behalf of the nation of Iran, respond with: 'Like hell you will!'...The persistent enmity of the US is with the nature of the [Islamic] system and the nuclear energy is nothing more than an excuse. If we go along with their wishes today, tomorrow they will bring more excuses.... Our officials and authorities tell me that they want to continue the JCPOA with these three European countries [France, Germany and the UK]. I don't trust these three countries either." President Hassan Rouhani said: "The US has announced that it doesn't respect its commitments." He said Iran intended to stick to the nuclear deal but would ultimately do what was best for the country. In a statement just minutes after Trump withdrew the US from the deal, Rouhani said: "I have directed the Atomic Energy Agency to prepare for the next steps, if necessary, to begin our own industrial enrichment without restriction. We will wait several weeks before acting on this decision. We will be consulting with friends, our allies and members who have signed on to the agreement. Everything depends on our national interests. If our nation's interests are attained in the end, we will continue the process." He said the deal would continue if Iran could meet its people's demands with the cooperation of five countries in a short period.
- European Union top diplomat Federica Mogherini said the EU was "determined to preserve the deal". She said the JCPOA was a firm decision and that no single country could break it, and proposed a "collective process" to preserve the deal: "this deal is not a bilateral agreement...[t]he international community, and the European Union...has clearly indicated that the deal is, and will, continue to be in place." EU Commission President Jean-Claude Juncker said he understood that the US no longer wanted to cooperate with other countries. According to him, the US had lost vigor as an international actor and would lose influence in the long term.
- France's economy minister Bruno Le Maire said it was "not acceptable" for the US to be the "economic policeman of the planet". Leaders of France, Germany, and the United Kingdom jointly expressed "regret" at Trump's decision.
- Germany expressed "regret" at Trump's decision.
- United Kingdom expressed "regret" at Trump's decision.
- Russia's Kremlin spokesman Dmitry Peskov told reporters there would be "inevitable harmful consequences to any actions towards breaking [the JCPOA]". Russian foreign minister Sergey Lavrov criticized the US, saying, "once again we see that Washington is trying to revise key international agreements, this time to the Joint Comprehensive Plan of Action, the Jerusalem issue and a number of other agreements."
- China's foreign ministry reiterated that all sides should continue to uphold the agreement and that the IAEA had said many times that Iran was in compliance with it. Chinese Foreign Ministry spokeswoman Hua Chunying said, "All sides need to continue upholding the pact." After the US withdrew, China worked with the remaining signatories to develop avenues such as Instrument in Support of Trade Exchanges that might result in Iran's continued compliance and facilitate legitimate trade with Iran amid the US-imposed sanctions on Iran.

==== Middle East ====
- Jordan's foreign minister Ayman Safadi warned of "dangerous repercussions" and a possible arms race in the Middle East unless a political solution was found to free the region of nuclear weapons and other weapons of mass destruction.
- Syria "strongly" condemned Trump's decision to withdraw from the agreement.

==== G20 states ====
- Australia's prime minister Malcolm Turnbull said he regretted the decision.
- Italy's prime minister Paolo Gentiloni said the agreement must be preserved.
- Japan's foreign ministry said Japan continued to support the deal and that it "hopes for a continued constructive response from the nations involved".
- Turkey's presidential spokesman İbrahim Kalın said the US withdrawal would cause instability and new conflicts.

==== Others ====
- Ireland's minister of foreign affairs Simon Coveney said he was "greatly disappointed by the US announcement that it is withdrawing from the nuclear agreement with Iran".
- Netherlands' deputy vice prime minister Hugo de Jonge said the Netherlands would try to keep the deal intact as much as possible and would make diplomatic efforts to that end. He added that the Dutch government found Trump's decision to withdraw extremely unwise, as it would affect international security and thus also the security of the Netherlands.
- New Zealand's prime minister Jacinda Ardern said the withdrawal was a step backward.
- Singapore's permanent representative to the United Nations Foo Kok Jwee urged "all relevant parties to remain committed to the JCPoA".
- Spain's prime minister Mariano Rajoy criticized Trump's decision to leave the deal.
- Switzerland's authorities said the US withdrawal did not change their position or respect for the accord. In January 2020, the Swiss Humanitarian Trade Arrangement (SHTA) was implemented, assuring export guarantees through Swiss financial institutions for shipments of food and medical products to Iran.

=== Neutral countries ===
- Oman reiterated its friendly and cooperative relations with the United States of America and the Islamic Republic of Iran, and stated that it will continue to follow up on this development and make all possible and available efforts to maintain the security and the stability in the region. Oman's Ministry of Foreign Affairs said that they value the stance of the five partners to adhere to this agreement, thus contributing to regional and international security and stability.
- Qatar stressed that the main priority is to free the Middle East from nuclear weapons and to prevent the entry of regional powers in a nuclear arms race.
- India called for diplomacy to resolve the dispute over the Iran nuclear deal. The foreign ministry was measured in its response: "All parties should engage constructively to address and resolve issues that have arisen with respect to the JCPOA," the foreign ministry said in a statement.

== Public opinion in the United States ==
A majority of Americans said the United States should remain in the JCPOA.

Should the United States withdraw from the Iran deal?
Stay in	63%
Leave	29%
No opinion	8%

According to the CNN poll conducted between May 2, 2018, and May 5, 2018, the strongest proponents of withdrawing from the deal were Republicans at 51%.

According to the Pew Research Center, 53% of the American public and 94% of U.S. scholars in international relations disapproved of Trump's decision to withdraw from the Iran nuclear weapons agreement.

== Aftermath ==
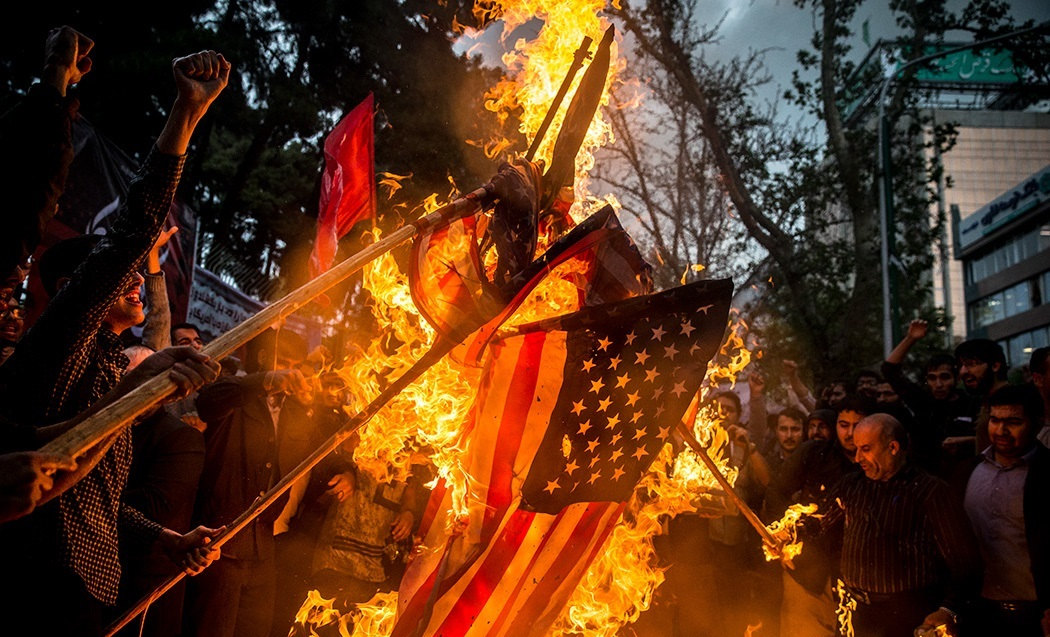
Protests around former U.S. embassy in Tehran, 8 May 2018

According to Antony Blinken, a former Obama deputy secretary of state who took part in the negotiation of the original deal, the JCPOA's future depends on Iran's willingness to abide by it, and so on the economic benefit the deal will give Iran. The Israeli military put their forces on alert. Israeli citizens living in the Golan Heights were told to prepare bomb shelters.

=== Trade ===
Trump also wanted to sanction European companies that trade with Tehran.

After the JCPOA was announced, in December 2016, Boeing signed a $17 billion deal with Iran and Airbus signed a $19 billion one. These deals were subsequently canceled. China is involved in a $1.5 billion deal for infrastructure, and its CITIC bank provides $10 billion lines of credit to Iranian banks. Using euros and the yuan, this bank should not be subject to US sanctions against companies that use US dollars.

The French company Total S.A. won a project in the South Pars gas field that could be hit by US sanctions. In anticipation of a possible pull-out by Total, Chinese company CNPC signed a $1 billion deal giving it the option to take over Total's commitments.

- Oil prices became unstable amid uncertainty of how President Trump's sanctions might affect the flow of crude oil out of Iran.
- In a phone interview with MSNBC, Former Secretary of State John Kerry said, "[Trump] has taken a situation where there was no crisis, and created crisis." "We [the United States] are in breach of the agreement," Kerry warned.
- On Wednesday, May 9, 2018, on the floor of the Iranian Parliament, Majlis, conservative MPs, set fire to a copy of the JCPOA amid chants of "death to America." They also set fire to a United States flag. Meanwhile, Iranian President Hassan Rouhani has attempted to moderate Iran's response. Rouhani promised to abide by the agreement for the time being and directed his diplomats to negotiate with the deal's remaining participants, saying the agreement could survive without the United States.
- John Hultquist, director of intelligence analysis at FireEye, a Milpitas, California cybersecurity company, said that Iran might attempt cyberattacks on American infrastructure: "They were in some very sensitive areas of airport networks where they could conceivably cause serious disruption ...but the malicious code was identified and the hackers were booted off". He declined to identify which U.S. airports were affected, saying only that there were multiple targets.
- Iranian Oil Minister Bijan Zanganeh said, "Trump's decision will not have any impact on our oil export".
- Ayatollah Ahmad Khatami said, "The holy system of the Islamic Republic will step up its missile capabilities day by day so that Israel, this occupying regime, will become sleepless and the nightmare will constantly haunt it that if it does anything foolish, we will raze Tel Aviv and Haifa to the ground".
- Iran announced its readiness to enrich uranium on an "industrial scale" starting in 2025. Iran's Atomic Energy Organization said in a statement, "The President of the Atomic Energy Organization of Iran has been tasked with taking all necessary steps in preparation for Iran to pursue industrial-scale enrichment without any restrictions, using the results of the latest research and development of Iran's brave nuclear scientists".

=== Economic impact ===
==== Iran ====
According to United Nations Special Rapporteur Idriss Jazairy, the reimposition of economic sanctions after the unilateral U.S. withdrawal in 2018 "is destroying the economy and currency of Iran, driving millions of people into poverty and making imported goods unaffordable." He appealed to the U.S. and the European Union to ensure that Iranian financial institutions can make payments for essential goods, including foods, medicines and industrial imports. The Office of the United Nations High Commissioner for Human Rights stressed that "sanctions must not harm the human rights of ordinary citizens."

In November 2019, when the Trump administration further tightened financial sanctions and the rial's devaluation continued, a subsequent increase in energy prices caused widespread protests and violent confrontations in Tehran and other major cities. The economies of border regions with urban areas, such as Zahedan, felt the most drastic impact as traders had to pay more for imports, e.g. electronic appliances, while at the same time, the export value for manufactured goods, such as Persian rugs, decreased. Iraq's economy was also seriously affected by the continued financial sanctions, since Iran is a major exporter of wheat to Iraq, and food prices increased in Iraq after 2016.

In September 2022, the IMF concluded in a working paper, "coupled with low economic growth and high unemployment, rising inflation has fueled widespread protests in the country amid a significant erosion in purchasing power." According to an estimate by Iran's Ministry of Labour and Social Services, international sanctions have pushed one-third of Iranians into poverty. Iranian analyst Abdolreza Davari confirmed that economic despair is one of the major factors uniting those who oppose Ebrahim Raisi's government. The protests themselves, triggered by the death of Mahsa Amini in mid-September, were seen as a possible stumbling block to revive JCPOA negotiations, as more sanctions were imposed on Iranian officials.

==== Global economy ====
According to a study by Harvard Business School, Iran could play a larger role in global energy markets if sanctions are lifted. But IranPoll found that only 47% of Iran's citizens approve of the nuclear deal, compared to 76% when it was originally introduced. The study also concluded that a revival of the JCPOA could be good for global equities. Even if a new agreement is out of reach, lifting secondary U.S. sanctions on Chinese and Indian entities could free up more than 1 million barrels of oil per day.

== See also ==
- Project Amad
- May 2018 Israel–Iran incidents
- United States withdrawal from the Paris Agreement
- United States withdrawal from the United Nations
- European Union blocking statute
- Iran–United States relations during the first Trump administration
