= Consulate-General of China, Istanbul =

Diplomatic mission of the People's Republic of China in Turkey

Consulate-General of the People's Republic of China in Istanbul 中华人民共和国驻伊斯坦布尔总领事馆
- Location: Istanbul
- Coordinates: 41.139758°N 29.0526823°E
- Opening: 1985
- Consul General: Wei Xiaodong
- Website: istanbul.china-consulate.org

The Consulate-General of the People's Republic of China in Istanbul (Chinese: 中华人民共和国驻伊斯坦布尔总领事馆; pinyin: Zhōnghuá Rénmín Gònghéguó zhù Yīsītǎnbù'ěr Zǒnglǐngshìguǎn, Turkish: Çin Halk Cumhuriyeti İstanbul Başkonsolosluğu) is a diplomatic mission representing China located in Istanbul.

Opened in 1985, it serves the city as well as surrounding areas. The consulate has been the site of protests because of the Xinjiang conflict and the Chinese government's treatment of the Uyghurs, with the persecution of Uyghurs in China leading to increased protesting. The Chinese government has also alleged that East Turkestan independence movement extremists bombed the consulate in 1998.

== History ==
The consulate was initially opened in July or August 1985. According to the consulate's website, it had consular jurisdiction in İstanbul, Balıkesir, Bursa, Çanakkale, Edirne, Kırklareli, Kocaeli, Tekirdağ, Yalova, and Manisa provinces as of 2018.

=== Uyghur-related protests and violence ===
The consulate, along with the embassy in Ankara, has been the site of several regularly-occurring protests regarding relations between the Chinese government and the Uyghur minority in Xinjiang. In 1989, Oral Çalışlar, Halil Berktay, and Hurriyet Karadeniz, then editors of the magazine "United Socialist" (Sosyalist Birlik), were arrested after laying a black wreath there to commemorate a "massacre" in China. Mass protests have been recorded as far back as June 1990, when 1,500 protesters demonstrated there in the aftermath of the Barin uprising. After reports of further persecution of the Uyghurs in 2015, the Chinese consulate was one of several sites where protests took place, with "several hundred" people involved. In January 2021, a series of protests by Uyghurs in Turkey to get the Chinese government to acknowledge their missing relatives led to the intervention of the Istanbul government, which got the consulate to accept the protestors' documents. However, the Turkish police also prohibited such gatherings based on security and pandemic restrictions. After moving to the embassy in Ankara in February, demonstrations accelerated in March over the visit of Chinese Foreign Minister Wang Yi at both the consulate in Istanbul and the embassy in Ankara.

The Chinese government alleged that "East Turkestan separatists" bombed the consulate in 1998. Sean Roberts of George Washington University investigated this and a number of other claimed terrorist attacks and concluded that it was the only instance of Uyghur "terrorism" out of the 45 occurrences provided by the government. The Chinese government has also claimed that "East Turkestan terrorists" fired at the embassy and burned the consulate's flag in 1997.
