= Global Governance Initiative =

Diplomatic initiative of the People's Republic of China

The Global Governance Initiative (GGI, Chinese: 全球治理倡议) is a diplomatic initiative of China presented by General Secretary of the Chinese Communist Party and Chinese President Xi Jinping in 2025. It complements the Global Security Initiative (GSI), the Global Development Initiative (GDI), and the Global Civilization Initiative (GCI).

In September 2025, CCP general secretary and president Xi Jinping presented the initiative in a speech in Beijing during the Tianjin SCO summit to commemorate the 80th anniversary of the United Nations.

== Core themes and strategies ==
- "Global South" Focus: These initiatives target developing nations, presenting China as a leader and champion of their interests against perceived Western hegemony.
- "True Multilateralism": Beijing uses these to promote a form of multilateralism that emphasizes national sovereignty and rejects unilateral sanctions.
- Connection to Other Projects: The Belt and Road Initiative (BRI) is considered an essential part of the economic foundation of these initiatives.
- Action-Oriented: The GGI emphasizes moving beyond rhetoric to "real actions," such as the establishment of a "China-U.N. Global South-South Development Facility".

== Reception ==
The G-initiatives are creating a "dual" perception: they are welcomed as constructive, non-interfering partnerships by many developing nations, while being viewed as geopolitical, value-shifting, and security-threatening tools by Western powers.

== See also ==
- Foreign policy of China
- Foreign policy of Xi Jinping
- Xi Jinping Thought
- Community of Common Destiny
