= List of ambassadors of China to Turkey =

Ambassador of China to Turkey
- 中国驻土耳其大使
- National emblem of China
- Incumbent; Jiang Xuebin since 9 January 2025
- Ministry of Foreign Affairs; Embassy of China, Ankara
- Appointer: The president pursuant to a National People's Congress Standing Committee decision
- Inaugural holder: Liu Chun
- Formation: 1 May 1972; 54 years ago
- Website: Chinese Embassy - Ankara

The Chinese ambassador to Turkey is the official representative of the People's Republic of China to the Republic of Turkey.

== List of representatives ==
Official full title	Duration
Envoy of the Republic of China to the Republic of Turkey	1934–1945
Ambassador Extraordinary and Plenipotentiary of the Republic of China to the Republic of Turkey	1945–1971
Ambassador Extraordinary and Plenipotentiary of the People's Republic of China to the Republic of Turkey	1972–Incumbent

=== Republic of China ===
==== Envoys ====
Name	Chinese name	Appointment	Arrival	Submission of credentials	Removal	Resignation	Rank	Ref.
Ho Yao-tsu	贺耀组	November 16, 1934	May 9, 1935	June 16, 1935	June 30, 1937		Minister	
Tong Deqian	童德乾	June 19, 1937	April 4, 1938			October 11, 1940	Chargé d'affaires	
P. C. Chang	张彭春	May 4, 1940	October 7, 1940	October 11, 1940	May 30, 1942	June 5, 1942	Minister	
Tsou Snang-yu	邹尚友	May 30, 1942	July 20, 1942			March 27, 1945	Minister	

==== Ambassadors ====
Name	Chinese name	Appointment	Arrival	Submission of credentials	Removal	Resignation	Rank	Ref.
Tsou Snang-yu	邹尚友	January 1, 1945	January 1, 1945			March 27, 1945	Chargé d'affaires	
Hsu Mo	徐谟	November 28, 1944	March 30, 1945	March 2, 1945	March 12, 1946	March 18, 1946	Ambassador	
Qiu Zuming	邱祖铭		March 18, 1946			June 5, 1947	Chargé d'affaires	
Ti Tsun Li	李迪俊	March 12, 1947	June 9, 1947	June 16, 1947	January 30, 1957	March 13, 1957	Ambassador	
Shao Yu-lin	邵毓麟	January 30, 1957	April 20, 1957	May 7, 1957	October 15, 1964	October 19, 1964	Ambassador	
Yuan Tse-kien	袁子健	October 14, 1964	November 20, 1964	November 30, 1964	February 21, 1967	March 18, 1967	Ambassador	
Pao Chun-chien	保君建	February 21, 1967	April 25, 1967	May 22, 1967		June 10, 1970	Ambassador	
Ni Yue-si	黎玉璽	June 18, 1970	June 22, 1970	June 25, 1970		August 4, 1971	Ambassador	

=== People's Republic of China ===
Name	Chinese name	Appointment		Arrival	Submission of Credentials	Removal		Resignation	Ref.
Name	Chinese name	NPC Standing Committee	President	Arrival	Submission of Credentials	NPC Standing Committee	President	Resignation	Ref.
Liu Chun	刘春	—N/a	—N/a	May 12, 1972	May 26, 1972	December 2, 1976	—N/a	March 18, 1976	
Wei Yongqing	卫永清	December 2, 1976	—N/a	May 29, 1976	June 29, 1976	February 23, 1979	—N/a	September 23, 1978	
Wang Yueyi	王越毅	February 23, 1979	—N/a	March 17, 1979	March 20, 1979		—N/a	October 23, 1981	
Zhou Jue	周觉	September 10, 1981	—N/a	December 1981	January 1, 1982	September 20, 1984	December 14, 1984	October 16, 1984	
Zhan Shiliang	詹世亮	September 20, 1984	December 14, 1984	December 1984	December 28, 1984	June 23, 1987	September 9, 1987	August 1987	
Liu Hua	刘华	June 23, 1987	September 9, 1987	August 1987	September 11, 1987	September 4, 1991	November 9, 1991	October 31, 1991	
Hu Changlin	胡昌林	September 4, 1991	November 9, 1991	December 1991	December 17, 1991	May 10, 1995	July 11, 1995	May 1995	
Wu Keming	吴克明	May 10, 1995	July 11, 1995	July 24, 1995	August 7, 1995	May 9, 1997	August 4, 1997	July 1997	
Yao Kuangyi	姚匡乙	May 9, 1997	August 4, 1997	August 1997	September 12, 1997		August 25, 2003	August 2003	
Song Aiguo	宋爱国		August 25, 2003	August 2003		August 27, 2006	December 15, 2006	October 2006	
Sun Guoxiang	孙国祥	August 27, 2006	December 15, 2006	November 21, 2006	December 7, 2006	June 26, 2008	November 6, 2008	September 2008	
Gong Xiaosheng	宫小生	June 26, 2008	November 6, 2008	October 2008	November 25, 2008	February 27, 2014	July 1, 2014	June 2014	
Yu Hongyang	郁红阳	February 27, 2014	July 1, 2014	July 1, 2014	July 10, 2014	October 26, 2018	February 3, 2019	December 2018	
Deng Li	邓励	October 26, 2018	February 3, 2019	January 26, 2019	February 7, 2019	May 18, 2020	November 5, 2020	August 2020	
Liu Shaobin	刘少宾	August 11, 2020	November 5, 2020	October 29, 2020	December 15, 2020		January 9, 2025	December 14, 2024	
Jiang Xuebin	姜学斌		January 9, 2025	January 5, 2025		Incumbent			

== See also ==
- China–Turkey relations
- List of ambassadors of Turkey to China
- Embassy of China, Ankara
