= Deng Li =

Chinese diplomat (born 1965)

- 邓励
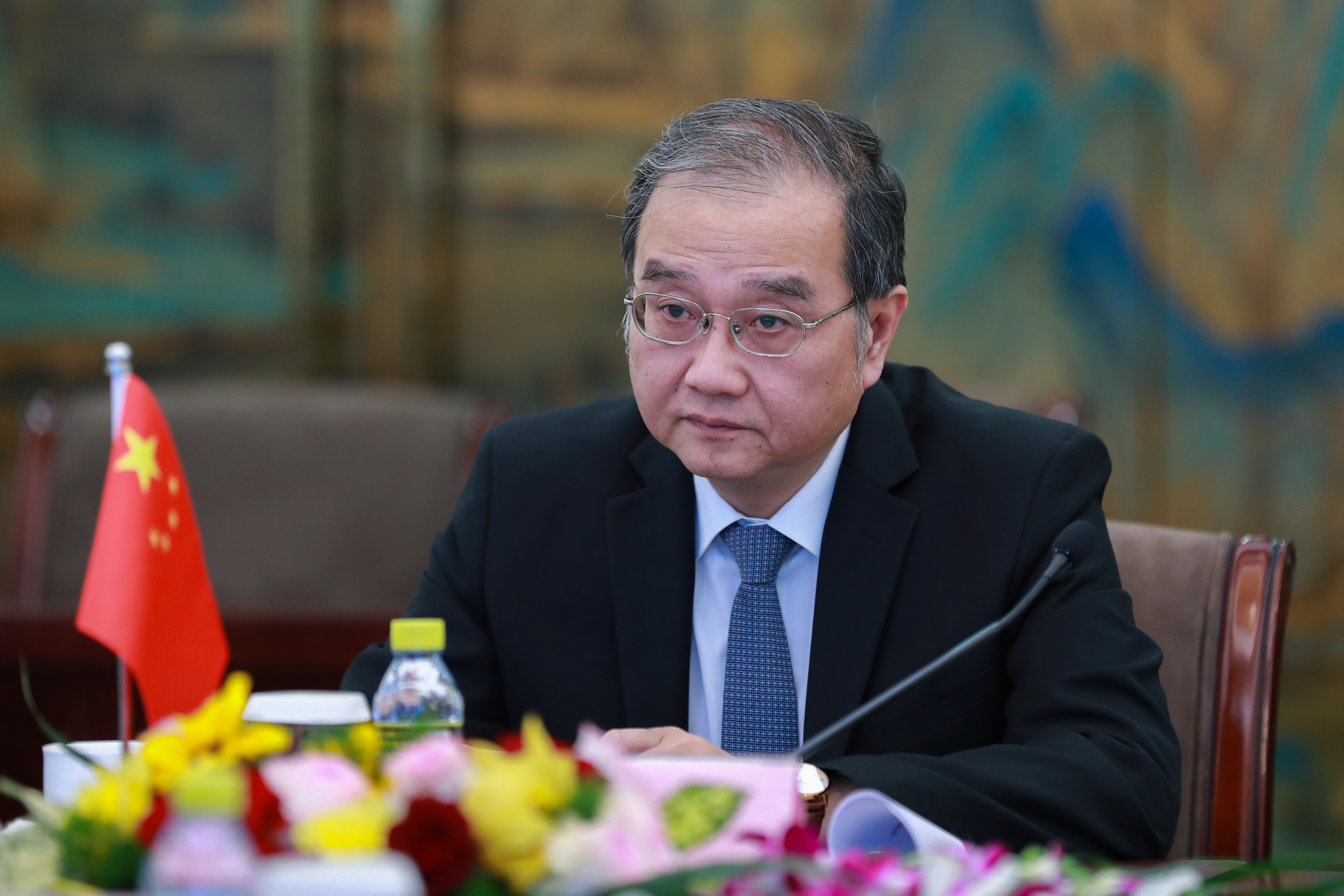
- Deng in 2023

Ambassador of China to France and Monaco
- Incumbent
- Assumed office 7 January 2025
- Preceded by: Lu Shaye

Vice Minister of Foreign Affairs
- In office October 2021 – January 2025 Serving with Ma Zhaoxu, Sun Weidong, Hua Chunying
- Minister: Wang Yi; Qin Gang; Wang Yi

Assistant Minister of Foreign Affairs
- In office August 2020 – October 2021
- Minister: Wang Yi
- Preceded by: Chen Xiaodong
- Succeeded by: Hua Chunying

Ambassador of China to Turkey
- In office 26 January 2019 – August 2020
- Preceded by: Yu Hongyang
- Succeeded by: Liu Shaobin

Personal details
- Born: May 1965 (age 61) Quanzhou, Fujian, China
- Spouse: Zhang Hua
- Children: 1
- Education: China Foreign Affairs University

Deng Li (simplified Chinese: 邓励; traditional Chinese: 鄧勵; pinyin: Dèng Lì; born May 1965) is a Chinese diplomat and politician who has served as Ambassador of China to France and Monaco since 2025. He previously served as Vice Minister of Foreign Affairs (2021–2025), Assistant Minister of Foreign Affairs (2020–2021), and Ambassador to Turkey (2019–2020).

== Early life and education ==
Deng Li was born in May 1965 in Quanzhou, Fujian Province. He graduated from the China Foreign Affairs University with a degree in French language.

== Career ==
Deng joined the Ministry of Foreign Affairs in 1987, beginning his career in the Department of West Asian and North African Affairs. His diplomatic postings have included assignments at Chinese embassies in Mauritania, Algeria, and Belgium. He served as Minister (deputy chief of mission) at the Chinese Embassy in France from 2011 to 2015.

From 2015 to 2019, Deng headed the Ministry's Department of West Asian and North African Affairs. He was appointed Ambassador to Turkey on 26 January 2019, serving until August 2020 when he was promoted to Assistant Minister of Foreign Affairs. In October 2021, he was further promoted to Vice Minister of Foreign Affairs, with responsibilities covering West Asia and North Africa, Africa, Europe, consular affairs, and archives.

=== Ambassador to France ===
Deng assumed his role as Ambassador of China to France and Monaco in January 2025, succeeding Lu Shaye. He officially began his tenure on 7 January after presenting his credentials to French protocol chief Frederic Pied. In a statement, Deng said, "China-France relations have a solid foundation and broad prospects. I am committed to work with the French side to contribute to the greater progress of bilateral relations."

His appointment came amid ongoing trade tensions between China and France, including disputes over brandy exports to China and European Union tariffs on Chinese-made electric vehicles. His predecessor, Lu Shaye, had been known for a confrontational diplomatic style and caused controversy in 2023 when he questioned the sovereignty of former Soviet states during a French television interview, drawing widespread criticism from European officials.

== Personal life ==
He is married to Zhang Hua and has one daughter.

Diplomatic posts
Preceded by Yu Hongyang	Chinese Ambassador to Turkey; 2019–2020	Succeeded by Liu Shaobin
Preceded by Lu Shaye	Ambassador of China to France and Monaco; 2025–present	Incumbent
Government offices
Preceded by Chen Xiaodong	Assistant Minister of Foreign Affairs; 2020–2021	Succeeded by Hua Chunying
