= List of ambassadors of China to France =

The ambassador of China to France is the official representative of the People's Republic of China to the French Republic.

The ambassador is also accredited to the Principality of Monaco.

== History ==
The position was established in a de facto sense with Guo Songtao's appointment as minister to France (as well as concurrently with the UK) from 1877 to 1879 as part of the United Kingdom's demands after the Margary Affair for an imperial commissioner to be posted to Britain.

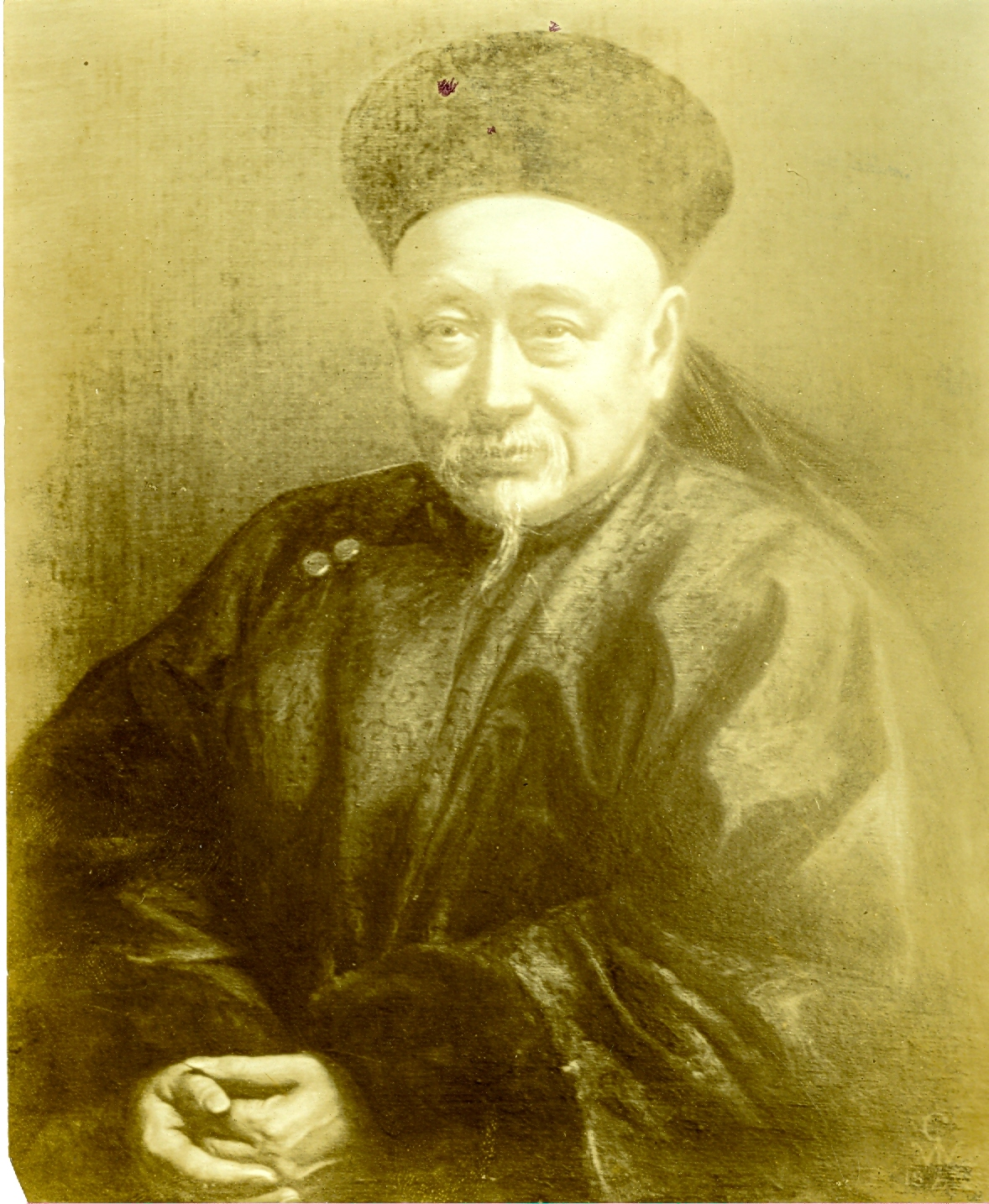
A Victorian photograph of Walter Goodman's 1877 portrait of Guo Songtao.

== Qing dynasty ==
- Guo Songtao (22 February–25 August 1878)
- Zeng Jize (25 August 1878 – 28 April 1884)
- Xu Jingcheng (28 April 1884–?), did not take office
- Li Fengbao (1884–August 23, 1884)
- Xu Jingcheng (1884–1887)
- Liu Ruifen (1887–1890)
- Chen Qinming (1890), did not take office
- Xue Fucheng (1889–1894)
- Gong Zhaoyuan (1893–1894)
- Qingchang (1895)
- Yu Geng (裕庚) (1899–1902)
- Sun Baoqi (1902–1905)
- Liu Shixun (1905–1911)
- Dai Chenlin (20 December 1911 – 1912)

== Republic of China (Beiyang government) ==
- Dai Chenlin (former Qing minister)
  - Lin Tongshi (1912 – 1913) (second counselor)
- Hu Weide (1912 – 1919)
- Yue Zhaoxue
- Chen Lu
- Qi Qi
- Gao Lu
- Qian Yongming
- Xie Weilin
- Wellington Koo

== Republic of China (Nationalist government in Nanjing) ==
- Wellington Koo (1936–1941), resuming post under new government
- Wei Daoming (1941–1942)
- Guo Zefan (1941–1943)
- Qian Tai (1944–1944)
- Duan Maolan (1949–1956)
- Chen Xiongfei (1956–1963)
- Gao Shiming (1963–1964)

For representatives after 1964, see the list of representatives of Taipei Representative Office in France.

== People's Republic of China (1964–present) ==
Though the People's Republic of China was founded in 1949, France did not recognize it until 1964 under Charles De Gaulle.

- Song Zhiguang (1964–1964)
- Huang Zhen (1964–1971)
- Zeng Tao (1973–1977)
- Han Kehua (1977–1980)
- Yao Guang (1980–1982)
- Cao Keqiang (1983–1986)
- Zhou Jue (1986–1986)
- Cai Fangbai (1990–1998)
- Wu Jianmin (1998–2003)
- Zhou Jinjun (2003–2008)
- Kong Quan (2008–2013)
- Zhai Jun (2014–2019)
- Lu Shaye (2019–2025)
- Deng Li (2025-present)
