= List of ambassadors of Turkey to China =

Ambassador of Turkey to China 土耳其驻华大使 Türkiye'nin Çin Büyükelçisi
- Incumbent; İsmail Hakkı Musa since 1 April 2023
- Residence: Beijing
- Inaugural holder: Ahmet Hulusi Fuad Tugay
- Formation: 3 July 1972
- Website: Turkish Embassy - Beijing

The Turkish Ambassador in Beijing is the official representative of the Government in Ankara to the Government of the People's Republic of China (PRC).

== List of Turkish chiefs of mission to China ==
=== Envoys to the Republic of China ===
Name	Term start	Term end	Notes
Hulusi Fuat Tugay	1 May 1929	30 July 1931	Chargé d'affaires in Nanjing: (* 1890 † 1967); From 31 December 1950 – 5 January 1954: Turkish Ambassador to Egypt
Emin Âli Sipahi	21 December 1939	20 September 1942	Minister in Chongqing presented credentials to President Lin Sen. (* 1895 † 1952) studied at the University of Istanbul, was a lecturer, professor, poet, and educator.: 28 October 1933 – 1938: envoy in Brussels.; 21 January 1944 – 10 June 1945: Envoy in Riyadh.; 26 September 1946 – 1950: Turkish Ambassador to Argentina.; 1951-1952: Turkish Ambassadors to Sweden.
Abdul Mennan Tebelen	19 April 1943	17 September 1943	Chargé d'affaires in Chongqing.: 8 September 1951: Consul General in Tokyo.

=== Ambassadors to the Republic of China ===
Name	Term start	Term end	Notes
Hulusi Fuat Tugay	29 May 1944	2 April 1947	Envoy in Chongqing; (1890–1967)
Muammer Hamdi Dambel	2 April 194	5 February 1948	Chargé d'affaires in Chongqing.: 1952: Consul General in Paris
Necdet Özmen	5 February 1948	25 October 1948	Chargé d'affaires in Chongqing.: 1971-1973: Ambassador in Santiago de Chile
İzzettin Aksalur	14 August 1953		General: From 27 July 1954 – 10 April 1960: Turkish Ambassador to Iran
Hikmet Hayri Anlı	30 March 1954	28 September 1957	Chargé d'affaires in Taipei: From 29 October 1957 to 1 April 1960 he was Consul General in New York
Cemi Vafi	5 January 1958		
Tevfik Kâzım Kemahlı	27 May 1960	25 May 1963	Minister in Taipei: 1956: Turkish Ambassador to Bulgaria; From 1 January 1963 to 1 January 1964 he was Turkish Ambassador to Morocco
Turgut Aytuğ	26 May 1963	3 January 1967	Minister in Taipei: 1967-1970: Turkish Ambassador to Japan
Halûk Kocaman	28 January 1967	2 January 1970	Envoy in Taipei: Haluk Kocamen

=== Ambassadors to the People's Republic of China ===
Name	Term start	Term end	Notes
Ahmet Nuri Eren	31 October 1972	7 May 1974	
Adnan Bulak	22 October 1974	16 February 1978	29 January 1981: Turkish Ambassador to France
Oktay Cankardeş	30 August 1978	17 October 1980	From 11 August to 29 December 1962 he was Turkish Ambassador to Tunisia; From 2 November 1973 he was Turkish Ambassador to Serbia; From 1983–1988 he was Turkish Ambassador to the Soviet Union.
Necdet Tezel	24 November 1980	1 November 1984	From 1976 to 1980 he was Turkish Ambassador to Greece
Behiç Hazar	10 October 1984	16 June 1988	
Bilal Şimşir	27 June 1988	17 October 1990	
Reşat Arım	30 November 1990	16 May 1994	
Berhan Ekinci	31 May 1994	16 September 1996	From 1 January 2001 to 1 January 2004: Turkish Ambassador to Norway
Ünal Ünsal	30 September 1996	4 November 1998	From 31 May 1995 to 30 September 1996 he was Turkish Ambassador to Italy
Daryal Batıbay	17 October 1998	17 August 2000	
Rafet Akgünay	30 July 2000	17 October 2004	
Oktay Özüye	30 November 2004	28 December 2008	From 1 August 1995 to 1 March 1998 he was Turkish Ambassador to Singapore
Murat Salim Esenli	1 April 2009	1 December 2013	
Ali Murat Ersoy	15 December 2013	December 2017	Graduate of TED Ankara College and the Ankara University, Faculty of Political Sciences, Department of International Relations.; Completed master's degree in International Studies at the University of Reading.
Abdulkadir Emin Önen	1 December 2017	15 March 2023	
İsmail Hakkı Musa	1 April 2023		From October 2011 to October 2012 he was Turkish Ambassador to Belgium; From November 2016 to March 2021 he was Turkish Ambassador to France

== See also ==
- China–Turkey relations
- Foreign relations of China
- Foreign relations of Turkey
