= List of ambassadors of China to Monaco =

The ambassador of China to Monaco is the official representative of the People's Republic of China to Monaco.

== List of representatives ==
=== Consuls general ===
Name (English)	Name (Chinese)	Tenure begins	Tenure ends	Note
Hou Guixin	侯贵信	January 1995	July 1996	
Xie Xiehe	谢燮禾	August 1996	July 2000	
Chen Meifen	陈美芬	August 2000	August 2002	
Li Xiaosu	李小苏	September 2002	January 2006	

=== Ambassadors ===
Name (English)	Name (Chinese)	Tenure begins	Tenure ends	Note
Zhao Jinjun	赵进军	22 March 2006	February 2008	
Kong Quan	孔泉	March 2008	May 2013	
Zhai Jun	翟隽	January 2014	June 2019	
Lu Shaye	卢沙野	August 2019		

== See also ==
- China–Monaco relations
