= List of ambassadors of China to Jordan =

Coordinates: 31.978343°N 35.881227°E

Ambassador of China to Jordan
- Incumbent; Pan Weifang since January 2016
- Inaugural holder: Chih-Ping Chen
- Formation: 1956; 70 years ago

The ambassador of China to Jordan is the official representative of the People's Republic of China to the Hashemite Kingdom of Jordan.

== List of representatives ==
Diplomatic agrément/Diplomatic accreditation	Ambassador	Chinese language zh:中国驻约旦大使列表	Observations	Premier of the People's Republic of China	List of kings of Jordan	Term end
1956	Chih-Ping Chen	zh:陈质平		Yu Hung-Chun	Hussein of Jordan	August 27, 1959
August 27, 1959	Pao Chun-chien	保君建	Till August 27, 1959 he was advisor to the Foreign Ministry; From June 17, 1966 to June 1970 he was ambassador in Ankara, Turkey.	Chen Cheng	Hussein of Jordan	June 17, 1966
February 3, 1967	Chen Chia-shang		General 1957-1961 commander in chief of the Republic of China Air Force.	Yen Chia-kan	Hussein of Jordan	May 25, 1969
May 24, 1972	Wang Shuming	zh:王叔銘		Chiang Ching-kuo	Hussein of Jordan	
December 1977	Gu Xiaobo	zh:谷小波		Hua Guofeng	Hussein of Jordan	April 1982
June 1982	Huang Shixie	zh:黄世燮		Zhao Ziyang	Hussein of Jordan	May 1985
July 1985	Zhang Zhen (diplomat, born 1936)	zh:张真		Zhao Ziyang	Hussein of Jordan	March 1989
October 1989	Zhang Deliang	zh:章德良		Li Peng	Hussein of Jordan	February 1993
November 1992	Wang Shijie (PRC diplomat)	王世杰		Li Peng	Hussein of Jordan	December 1995
August 1995	Liu Baolai	zh:刘宝莱	(* 1941 in the province of Shandong): From 1965 to 1967 he learned Arabic at Mohammed V University in Rabat (Morocco).; From 1967 to 1989 he was employed in Sudan, Kuwait and Rabat Morocco; From 1989 to 1991 he was secretary, consjereo deputy director in the Ministry of Foreign Affairs in Beijing.; From June 1991 to November 1995 he was ambassador to the [United Arab Emirates]; From August 1995 to July 1999 he was ambassador to Amman (Jordan).; From 2000 to 2002 he was Secretary of the Ministry of Foreign Affairs.; From 2002 to 2007 he was Secretary General and Vice President of the Chinese People's Institute for Foreign Affairs.; Since 2007 he is director of the Chinese Institute for International Studies.	Li Peng	Hussein of Jordan	July 1999
April 1999	Qiu Shengyun	zh:邱胜云		Zhu Rongji	Abdullah II of Jordan	August 2001
April 2001	Chen Yonglong	zh:陈永龙	From April 2001 to October 2003 he was ambassador to Amman (Jordan).; From June 2003 to April 2007 he was Chinese Ambassador to Israel.	Zhu Rongji	Abdullah II of Jordan	October 2003
June 2003	Luo Xingwu	zh:罗兴武	From April 2001 to October 2003 he was ambassador to Tripoli (Libya).; From June 2003 to August 2006 he was ambassador to Amman (Jordan).	Wen Jiabao	Abdullah II of Jordan	August 2006
September 2006	Gong Xiaosheng	zh:宫小生		Wen Jiabao	Abdullah II of Jordan	October 2008
October 2008	Yu Hongyang	zh:郁红阳		Wen Jiabao	Abdullah II of Jordan	July 2010
July 2010	Yue Xiaoyong	zh:岳晓勇	From June 2007 to October 2010 he was ambassador to Doha (Qatar).; From July 2010 to December 2013 he was ambassador to Amman (Jordan).	Wen Jiabao	Abdullah II of Jordan	December 2013
December 2013	Gao Yusheng	zh:高育生	(* 1955 in Hebei Province) In 1964, he was admitted to the Arab School in Beijing.: In 1972 he entered the foreign service and studied at the University of Cairo.; From April 2002 to January 2006 he was ambassador to Aden (Yemen).; From October 2006 to January 2012 Abu Dhabi (United Arab Emirates).; From December 2013 to December 2015 he was ambassador to Amman (Jordan).	Li Keqiang	Abdullah II of Jordan	December 2015
January 2016	Pan Weifang	zh:潘偉芳	(* February 1959): From November 2006 to December 2010 he was ambassador to Muscat Oman).; From March 2013 to December 2015 he was ambassador to Bratislava (Slovakia).; Since January 2016 he is ambassador to Amman (Jordan).	Li Keqiang	Abdullah II of Jordan	
