= Kong Quan =

Chinese diplomat and politician

- 孔泉
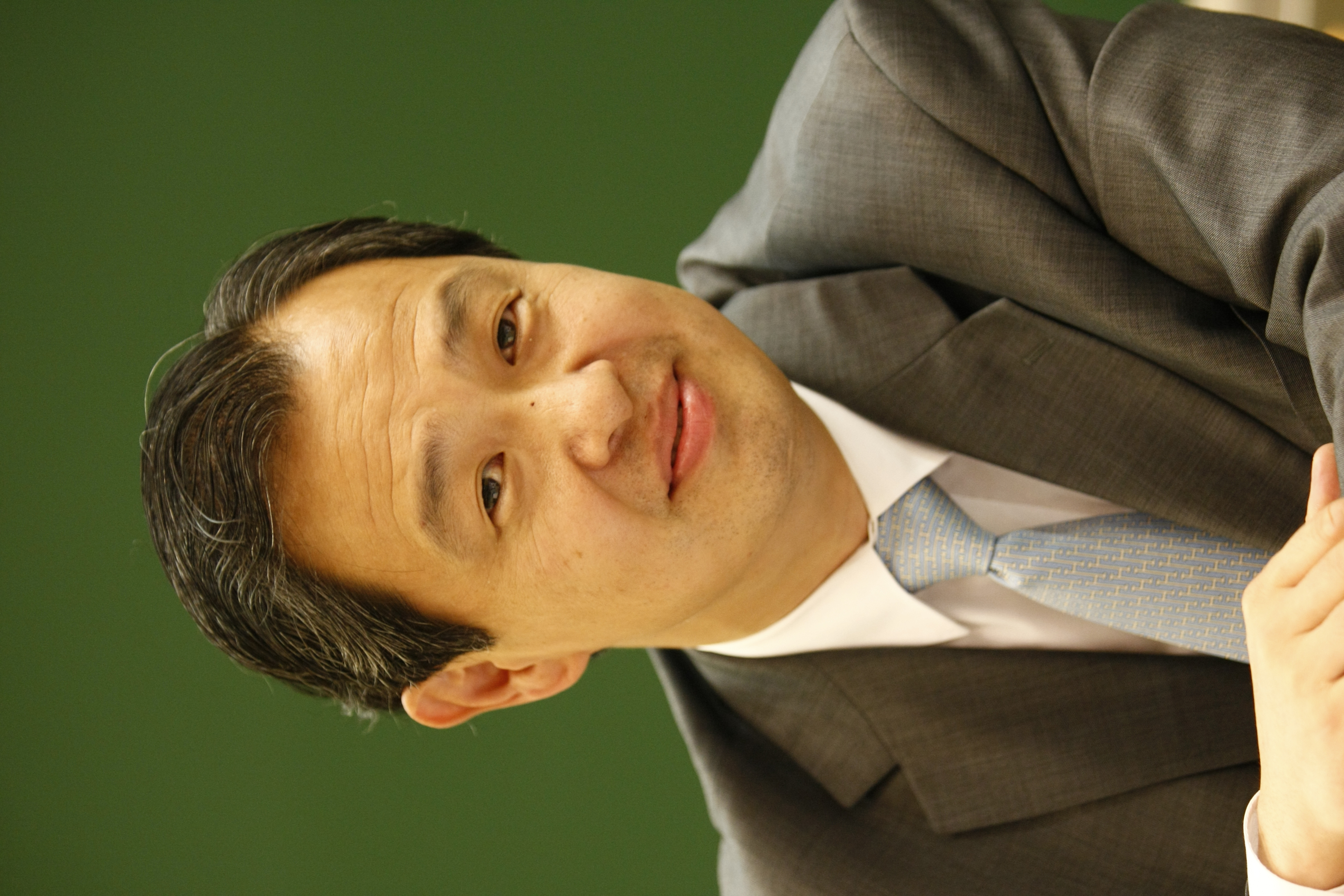
- Kong in August 2008

Executive Deputy Director of the Office of the Central Foreign Affairs Commission
- In office November 2015 – 2018
- Preceded by: Song Tao
- Succeeded by: Liu Jianchao

Chinese Ambassador to France and Monaco
- In office March 2008 – May 2013
- Preceded by: Zhao Jinjun
- Succeeded by: Zhai Jun

Personal details
- Born: November 1955 (age 70) New Delhi, India
- Party: Chinese Communist Party
- Spouse: Wang Yingying
- Children: 1
- Education: University of Mons; University of Antwerp; École nationale d'administration

Chinese name
Transcriptions
Standard Mandarin
- Hanyu Pinyin: Kǒng Quán
- IPA: [kʰʊ̀ŋ tɕʰwǎn]
Southern Min
- Teochew Peng'im: Kong^{2} Zuan^{5}

Kong Quan (Chinese: 孔泉; pinyin: Kǒng quán; born November 1955) is a Chinese diplomat and politician who served as Chinese Ambassador to France and Monaco from 2008 to 2013.

He is a member of the 13th National Committee of the Chinese People's Political Consultative Conference.

== Early life and education ==
Kong was born in New Delhi, India, in November 1955, to Kong Mai (孔迈), a journalist with his ancestral home in Puning, Guangdong. He is a 76th generation descendant of Confucius. He attended the Affiliated School of Beijing Foreign Studies University, and graduated from the University of Mons, University of Antwerp and the École nationale d'administration.

== Career ==
Kong joined the Foreign Service in 1977 and has served primarily in Western Europe. In 2002, he became director of the Information Department of the Ministry of Foreign Affairs, and held that office until 2006. He subsequently served as director of the Department of European Affairs, and soon reappointed assistant minister of Foreign Affairs.

He was Chinese Ambassador to France in March 2008, in addition to serving as Chinese Ambassador to Monaco.

He was chosen as deputy director of the Office of the Central Foreign Affairs Commission in 2013, and rose to executive deputy director in November 2015.

== Honors and awards ==
- 18 May 2013 Legion of Honour

Government offices
Preceded by Zhu Bangzao	Director of the Information Department of the Ministry of Foreign Affairs; 2002–2006	Succeeded by Liu Jianchao
Diplomatic posts
Preceded by Zhao Jinjun	Chinese Ambassador to France and Monaco; 2008–2013	Succeeded by Zhai Jun
Party political offices
Preceded by Song Tao	Executive Deputy Director of the Office of the Central Foreign Affairs Commission; 2015–2018	Succeeded by Liu Jianchao
