= Barin uprising =

1990 armed conflict in Xinjiang, China

Coordinates: 39°05′52″N 75°47′14″E

- Part of the Xinjiang conflict
- Chinese soldiers and militiamen escort Uyghurs captured in the uprising.
Date	4–10 April 1990
Location	Barin Township, Akto County, Kizilsu Prefecture, Xinjiang, China
Result	Chinese government victory

Belligerents
East Turkestan Islamic Party (Note: Not to be confused with the Turkistan Islamic Party, founded over seven years after the Barin uprising, in September 1997.) (Chinese government claim) Free Turkestan Movement (US CRS report claim)	People's Republic of China

Commanders and leaders
Zeydun Yusup †; Abduhani Tursun (POW); Jamal Memet (POW); Abdul Qasim (US CRS report claim)	Xu Xinjian †; Ali Yasin (WIA); Wu Yong (WIA); Tian Chongfeng †; Memet Ali

Units involved
	People's Armed Police; People's Liberation Army; Local militias

Strength
200–300 men	Initially: 130 armed police Reinforcements on 5 April: 100+ soldiers and militiamen

Casualties and losses
16 killed 6 wounded 232 captured	7 killed 15 wounded 5 captured (all rescued)
- Location of Barin Township in Xinjiang, China

The Barin uprising (also known by other names) was an armed conflict between Uyghur militants and Chinese government forces from 4 to 10 April 1990 in the township of Barin (or Baren) in Xinjiang, China. Violence began on the evening of 4 April, when a group of 200 to 300 Uyghur men attempted to breach the gates of the local government office in a protest against forced abortions of Uyghur women and Chinese rule in Xinjiang. The arrival of 130 armed police to quell the unrest was immediately met with armed resistance by militants among the crowd. Initial clashes that evening left six policemen dead and 13 wounded. The militants also captured five policemen, while the armed police captured 19 militants.

The armed police called for reinforcements from the People's Liberation Army (PLA) the next day, following two failed attempts at negotiations and a prisoner exchange. The uprising ended shortly after the arrival of Chinese reinforcements, with most militants surrendering but some fleeing to the Kunlun Mountains. The escaped militants were all eventually captured by the PLA from 6 to 10 April. Analysts and scholars generally consider the event to be a watershed moment in Xinjiang's history which caused the Chinese government to tighten its policies in the region.

== Names ==
The Chinese government's official name for the conflict is the "Counter-revolutionary armed riot in Barin Township, Akto County". (Note: Chinese: 阿克陶县巴仁乡反革命武装暴乱; pinyin: Ākètáo Xiàn Bārén Xiāng fǎngémìng wǔzhuāng bàoluàn) The East Turkestan Government-in-Exile describes the events as the "Barin revolution" (Note: Uyghur: بارىن ئىنقىلابى, romanized: Barin inqilabi) or "Barin massacre". (Note: Uyghur: بارىن قىرغىنچىلىقى, romanized: Barin qirghinciliqi) Another name is the "Barin Township incident". (Note: Chinese: 巴仁乡事件; pinyin: Bārén Xiāng shìjiàn)

== Prelude ==
Because of the Chinese state's restrictions on the flow of information out of Xinjiang, detailed accounts of the conflict have relied heavily or entirely on sources published by the Chinese government. A United States Congressional Research Service report dated 17 December 2001 stated that the uprising was organised by the Free Turkestan Movement and led by an "Islamic fundamentalist" named Abdul Qasim. These names were repeated by BBC Monitoring in a 2003 news report. Meanwhile, a Chinese government editorial published in 2002 attributes the uprising to the "East Turkestan Islamic Party (ETIP)", a clandestine organisation supposedly founded in Barin in 1989. The editorial claims that the ETIP held four major planning meetings in the months prior to the uprising, one of which was devoted to the procurement of supplies, including weapons and uniforms. At the fourth meeting held on 25 March 1990, Zeydun Yusup was designated as the group's commander-in-chief, Abduhani Tursun as the deputy commander-in-chief, and Jamal Memet as the military commander. The ETIP allegedly ran a training camp for militants toward the end of March 1990, and raised funds for weapons and vehicles by robbing local Xinjiang Production and Construction Corps.

The editorial, as well as an internal report written by the Chinese government immediately after the uprising, identified Zeydun as the ETIP's leader. The Chinese government claims that Zeydun and the ETIP wanted to seize Barin to set up a militant stronghold from which they could establish a third East Turkestan Republic.

== Timeline ==
The following timeline is based on an internal report by the Chinese government written immediately after the uprising and subsequently leaked to the foreign press.

=== 4 April ===
On the evening of 4 April 1990, Zeydun led a group of 200 to 300 men to the local government office in Barin to protest against the extension of family planning regulations to Uyghurs, who had previously been exempt. A total of 250 abortions had been enforced on local Uyghur women since the regulations were revised. The group then began to shout anti-communist and pro-independence slogans, such as "Down with socialism", "Marxism suppressed Islam, now it is our turn to suppress Marxism", and "Take Barin, establish Eastern Turkestan". At 6:30 pm (Xinjiang Time) armed militants among the group began attacking the gates of the office in an attempt to breach them. A detachment of 130 armed police was deployed to quell the unrest; it was immediately ambushed by the militants upon arriving in the vicinity of Barin. The militants killed six policemen, wounded 13, and captured five; a number of rifles and rounds of ammunition were also taken. The armed police meanwhile captured 19 militants.

=== 5 April ===
At midnight on 5 April 1990, the militants proposed a prisoner exchange, but the armed police only agreed to open a dialogue with Zeydun. Negotiations ultimately failed and, at approximately 4:10 am, the militants began throwing grenades and firing at the armed police. The armed police returned fire, killing Zeydun at 4:44 am.

Chinese reinforcements began arriving after 5 am. Over a hundred armed police from No. 6 Squadron of Kashgar Prefecture, as well as 40 from the Akto Border Defence Brigade, arrived within the hour. At 5:23 am, the militants again proposed dialogue and a prisoner exchange. However, the captured militants feared they would be killed in subsequent clashes with the armed police following their release, and refused the exchange. Consequently, the armed police instead requested reinforcements from the People's Liberation Army (PLA), who arrived at 8:15 am with two militia companies (of the No. 41 Regiment of the No. 3 Agricultural Division, and of the Kashgar Cotton Mill).

The uprising was completely suppressed by 9:50 am. Six militants had been killed and several dozen had fled to the Kunlun Mountains. The remaining militants surrendered peacefully.

The PLA dispatched a 23-man cavalry team to capture the escaped militants. It was led by a local Uyghur squadron leader named Memet Ali.

=== 6–10 April ===
By the early morning of 6 April, the PLA had captured 23 of the escaped militants.

PLA soldiers found and besieged the hideout of 16 escaped militants on 8 April, at 11 am. The two groups exchanged fire, resulting in the deaths of six militants and the capture of three.

On 9 April, a local guide and interpreter for the PLA was killed by escaped militants. Two PLA soldiers were wounded and three militants were killed in the subsequent shootout.

The conflict ended on 10 April, at 3:30 am, with the capture of the remaining militants. The PLA claimed that it had arrested a total of 232 militants in connection with the uprising.

== Aftermath ==
Official figures put the total number of dead at 23 and wounded at 21. Of the dead, seven were policemen or soldiers, while 16 were militants. Among the Chinese side's dead were Xu Xinjian, deputy instructor of the Akto Border Defence Brigade; and Tian Chongfeng, deputy squadron leader of No. 6 Squadron of Kashgar Prefecture's armed police detachment. No. 6 Squadron's captain Ali Yasin and squadron leader Wu Yong were wounded in the same ambush that left Tian dead.

The uprising shocked regional Chinese Communist Party officials in Xinjiang, who were surprised at the organisation, scale, and openly political nature of the initial protest. Analysts and scholars generally agree that the uprising was the impetus for tightening policies in Xinjiang. In an unprecedented move, Chinese authorities arrested 7,900 people, labelled "ethnic splittists" and "counter-revolutionaries", from April to July 1990.

== Legacy ==
The East Turkestan Government-in-Exile celebrates 5 April annually as the anniversary of the "Barin revolution".

=== Turkey ===
On 5 April 2021, the 31st anniversary of the conflict in Barin, Turkish politicians Meral Akşener (leader of the Good Party) and Mansur Yavaş (mayor of Ankara) released statements commemorating the Uyghurs killed in the conflict. Akşener said, "[Turkey] will not remain silent on [the Uyghurs'] persecution and martyrdom," while Yavaş said, "[Turkey] still feels the pain of the massacre." The Chinese embassy in Ankara responded with a statement which read in part: "The Chinese side determinedly opposes any person of power that in any way challenges China's sovereignty and territorial integrity and strongly condemns this. The Chinese side reserves its legitimate right to respond." Turkey's Ministry of Foreign Affairs subsequently summoned Liu Shaobin, the Chinese ambassador to Turkey.
