= Blocking statute =

Law meant to counter another jurisdiction's law

A blocking statute is a law of one jurisdiction intended to hinder application there of a law made by a foreign jurisdiction. A blocking statute was proposed by the European Union in 1996 to nullify a US trade embargo on Cuba and sanctions related to Iran and Libya which affected countries trading with the US and with the named countries. The 1996 statute was not enacted as the disagreements were settled by other means.

== Operation ==
A blocking statute shields companies in its jurisdiction against sanctions by prohibiting them from respecting the sanctions, and not recognising foreign court rulings enforcing them.

== European Union blocking statute ==
A EU blocking statute was originally enacted in 1996 to "counteract" the sanctions imposed by the United States against Cuba, Iran and Libya.

After the US reimposed sanctions against Iran following its withdrawal from an agreement which permitted trade if Iran curtailed its nuclear programme, on 17 May 2018 the European Commission announced its intention to implement the blocking statute of 1996 to declare the US sanctions against Iran null and void in Europe and ban European citizens and companies from complying with them. The commission also instructed the European Investment Bank to facilitate European companies' investment in Iran.

=== 2018 update ===
On 7 August 2018, the EU updated its blocking statute. The process of updating the EU blocking statute commenced by adding to its scope on 6 June 2018 the extraterritorial sanctions the US re-imposed on Iran. The European Commission said:

We are determined to protect European economic operators engaged in legitimate business with Iran, in accordance with EU law and with UN Security Council resolution 2231 ... This is why the European Union’s updated Blocking Statute enters into force on 7 August to protect EU companies doing legitimate business with Iran from the impact of US extra-territorial sanctions.

The 2018 blocking statute essentially prohibits EU companies from "direct" or "indirect" (via subsidiaries or intermediary persons) compliance with the laws listed in US sanctions annex. It also does not recognize any verdicts by courts that enforce US penalties. A to-be-established clearing house will, through a special-purpose vehicle set up for this purpose, facilitate trade with Iran by European companies, bypassing US sanctions.

European governments regard the blocking statute as "more of a political weapon than a regulation", since, it wrote, the blocking statute's rules were "vague and difficult to enforce". A senior US administration official said they were not "particularly concerned by" the imposition of the blocking statute.

Following the withdrawal of the United States from the Joint Comprehensive Plan of Action in 2018, the European Union additionally supported the creation of the Instrument in Support of Trade Exchanges (INSTEX), a special-purpose vehicle intended to facilitate limited trade with Iran while bypassing direct exposure to U.S. sanctions enforcement mechanisms.

Scholars and commentators have argued, however, that the Blocking Statute has limited practical effectiveness for firms with substantial exposure to the United States economy, because it cannot prevent the United States from restricting access to U.S. markets, dollar-clearing systems, correspondent banking networks, or the broader U.S. financial system through secondary sanctions and enforcement by the Office of Foreign Assets Control (OFAC). This tension was examined in Bank Melli Iran v Telekom Deutschland GmbH, in which Deutsche Telekom terminated a contract with Bank Melli Iran after the reimposition of U.S. sanctions on Iran.

In its judgment, the Court of Justice of the European Union held that companies invoking exposure to U.S. sanctions as justification for terminating business relationships may be required to provide reasons for their decision before national courts. However, the Court further held that measures compelling the continuation of the contractual relationship, or imposing penalties for termination, would be incompatible with EU law where they would expose the undertaking to disproportionate economic consequences, including serious risks to its business arising from possible exclusion from the U.S. market or financial system. Commentators described the case as demonstrating the limits of the blocking statute as a countermeasure to U.S. sanctions policy, arguing that although the EU could formally nullify the legal effect of U.S. sanctions within its jurisdiction, it could not eliminate market-driven compliance motivated by the risk of exclusion from the U.S.-dominated global financial system.
