= Deli Fuad Pasha =

Turkish politician

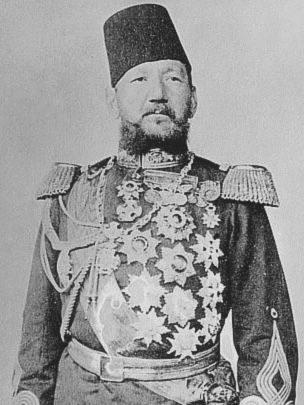
- Born: 1835; Cairo, Ottoman Empire
- Died: 1931 (aged 95–96); Istanbul, Turkey
- Allegiance: Ottoman Empire
- Service / branch: Ottoman Army
- Rank: General
- Battles / wars: Russo-Turkish War (1877–1878)
- Children: 5

Deli Fuad Pasha (Modern Turkish: Deli Fuat Paşa; 1835 – 17 April 1931) was an Ottoman marshal and ambassador, who participated in the Russo-Turkish War (1877–1878). He was born in Cairo in 1835.

Fuad Pasha served as the ambassador of the Ottoman Empire in Berlin between 1913 and 1915. He was a founding member of the Freedom and Accord Party.

His three sons, Said, Reşit and Halil, were killed in the battles between 1912 and 1915. His another son, Esat, was a diplomat and journalist. His youngest son, Hulusi Fuat Tugay, was a medical doctor and diplomat.
