= Indivisible security =

Cold War security concept

Indivisible security or the indivisibility of security is a term first used during the Cold War. First included in the Helsinki Accords as the "indivisibility of security in Europe", the term states that the security of one nation is inseparable from other countries in its region. In 2022, Russia has used this term to justify its military build-up near Ukraine, which ultimately led to a full-scale invasion. The term has also been promoted by China, including as part of its promoted "Global Security Initiative".

== Sources ==
- Lanko, Dmitry; Yarovoy, Gleb (6 January 2023). "From Stalin to Putin: Indivisibility of Peace and Security in Russian IR Scholarship and Foreign Policy". The Routledge Handbook of Russian International Relations Studies. London: Routledge. doi:10.4324/9781003257264-24. ISBN 978-1-003-25726-4.
- Zha, Daojiong; Dong, Ting (2023). "A Chinese Notion of Indivisibility of Security?". Asian Perspective. 47 (2). Johns Hopkins University Press: 323–330. doi:10.1353/apr.2023.0012. ISSN 2288-2871. S2CID 258964723.
- Monaghan, A., ed. (2010). The Indivisibility of Security: Russia and Euro-Atlantic Security (PDF). Forum papers series. NATO Defense College, Research Division.
