= Lu Shaye =

Chinese diplomat (born 1964)

- 卢沙野
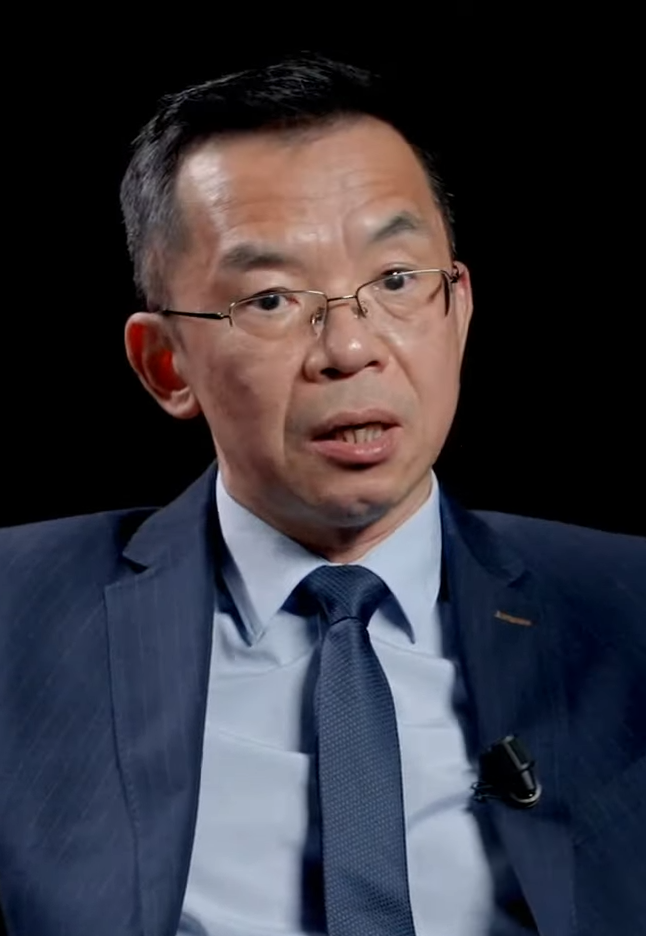
- Lu in 2021

Special Representative of the Chinese Government for European Affairs
- Incumbent
- Assumed office February 2025
- Preceded by: Wu Hongbo

Ambassador of China to France and to Monaco
- In office July 2019 – January 2025
- Preceded by: Zhai Jun
- Succeeded by: Deng Li

Ambassador of China to Canada
- In office February 2017 – June 2019
- Preceded by: Luo Zhaohui
- Succeeded by: Cong Peiwu

Ambassador of China to Senegal
- In office January 2006 – November 2009
- Preceded by: Cang Youheng
- Succeeded by: Gong Yuanxing

Personal details
- Born: October 1964 (age 61) Nanjing, Jiangsu, China
- Party: Chinese Communist Party
- Spouse: Wang Liwen
- Children: 1
- Education: China Foreign Affairs University

Lu Shaye (Chinese: 卢沙野; born October 1964) is a Chinese diplomat who has served as the Special Representative of the Chinese Government for European Affairs since February 2025.

Lu previously served as Ambassador of China to France and to Monaco from 2019 to 2025, as Ambassador of China to Canada from 2017 to 2019, and as Ambassador of China to Senegal from 2006 to 2009. Lu is known as a prominent wolf warrior diplomat, with combative remarks during his ambassadorship in France. He joined the Chinese foreign service in 1987 after graduating from college.

== Early life ==
Lu Shaye was born in Nanjing, Jiangsu, in October 1964. He is a native of Yueqing, Zhejiang. He attended the Nanjing Foreign Language School for high school, where he learnt to speak French and English. In 1982, he went to the China Foreign Affairs University for college.

== Career ==
Lu Shaye began his foreign service career in 1987 as a staff member at the Ministry of Foreign Affairs of China (MFA). From 1988 to 1991, he was posted to the Embassy of China in the Republic of Guinea, where he served as a staff member and attaché. Upon returning to China, he worked in the MFA Department of African Affairs from 1991 to 1999, advancing through various positions, including attaché, third secretary, deputy division director, first secretary, and division director.

Between 1999 and 2001, Lu was appointed as a counselor in the MFA Department of African Affairs. He then served as a counselor at the Embassy of China in the French Republic from 2001 to 2003. After returning from France, he served as Deputy Director-General of the MFA Department of African Affairs, from 2003 to 2005.

From 2005 to 2009, Lu served as the Ambassador of China to Senegal, overseeing diplomatic relations between the two countries. He then returned to Beijing, where he led the MFA Department of African Affairs as Director-General from 2009 to 2014.

From 2014 to 2015, Lu briefly transitioned to a domestic role as Vice Mayor of the city of Wuhan, Hubei Province. In 2015, he was later recalled to Beijing and was appointed Director-General of the Policy Research Bureau at the Office of the Central Leading Group for Foreign Affairs.

Lu resumed his diplomatic career in 2016 when he was appointed Ambassador of China to Canada, serving until 2019. He then took on a key European diplomatic post as Ambassador of China to France and to Monaco, a position he held until February 2025. He also served as member of the 14th National Committee of the Chinese People's Political Consultative Conference (2023–2028) from the Friendship with Foreign Countries Sector.

In February 2025, Lu was appointed as the Special Representative of the Chinese Government for European Affairs.

=== Media remarks ===
During Lu's ambassadorship to Canada, he had to handle the extradition case of Meng Wanzhou. He wrote in an op-ed and accused Canada of engaging in "Western egotism" and "white supremacy." He criticized some of the Canadian news media for stating that China's judicial system is less independent than Canada's. Canadian news outlet CBC News characterized Lu's role in Canada as "combative" and "aggressive wolf warrior diplomacy."

In August 2022, after Nancy Pelosi visited Taiwan, Lu said that the people of Taiwan had been brainwashed by pro-independence ideas saying, "I'm sure that as long as they are re-educated, the Taiwanese public will once again become patriots".

In December 2022, Lu said of the 2022 COVID-19 protests in China that, "Foreign forces came into play already on the second day".

On 22 April 2023 in a televised interview with Darius Rochebin, Lu stated that former Soviet countries "have no effective status in international law". When asked whether he thought Crimea belonged to Ukraine, Lu said, "it depends on how you perceive the problem", adding that "it's not that simple" and that Crimea was "Russian at the beginning", without specifying what he meant by beginning. Lu's intervention on Crimea prompted a response from Ukraine's ambassador to France Vadym Omelchenko who suggested raising the question "who owns Vladivostok?" with the Chinese ambassador next time. The Minister of Foreign Affairs of Latvia Edgars Rinkēvičs issued a response on Twitter stating that Lu's remarks were "completely unacceptable", and demanded an "explanation from the Chinese side and [a] complete retraction of this statement". He also further stated that Latvia, along with Lithuania and Estonia, would summon respective high ranking Chinese diplomats in their capitals to provide explanation regarding Lu's remarks. The Ministry of Foreign Affairs and European Integration of Moldova protested these declarations as well. About 80 European lawmakers called that "wolf-warrior activity at its worst" and asked the Minister of Europe and Foreign Affairs to declare Lu persona non grata in France immediately. The transcript of Lu's interview, which was initially published in both Chinese and French on the Chinese embassy to France's official WeChat account, was deleted and the transcript was not published on the embassy's website. Following the diplomatic outrage over Lu's remarks, Chinese Foreign Ministry spokesperson Mao Ning, at a regular press conference in Beijing, stated that China "respects the status of the member states as sovereign states after the collapse of the Soviet Union".

== Personal life ==
Lu married Wang Liwen (王立文); the couple has a son.

== See also ==
- List of ambassadors of China to France

Diplomatic posts
Preceded by Cang Youheng	Chinese Ambassador to Senegal; 2006–2009	Succeeded by Gong Yuanxing
Preceded by Luo Zhaohui	Chinese Ambassador to Canada; 2017–2019	Succeeded by Cong Peiwu
Preceded by Zhai Jun	Ambassador of China to France and Monaco; 2019–2025	Succeeded by Deng Li
Preceded by Wu Hongbo	Special Representative of the Government of the People's Republic of China for European Affairs; 2025–present	Incumbent
