= Song Aiguo =

Chinese ambassador

Chinese Ambassador to Cyprus of China to Cyprus
- In office September 2000 – February 2003
- Preceded by: Yin Zuojin
- Succeeded by: Zhang Limin

Chinese Ambassador to Turkey of China to Turkey
- In office 2003–2006
- Preceded by: Yao Kuangyi
- Succeeded by: Sun Guoxiang

Chinese Ambassador to Egypt of China to Egypt
- In office October 2010 – May 2019
- Preceded by: Wu Chunhua
- Succeeded by: Liao Liqiang

Personal details
- Born: 1954 (age 71–72) Jiangsu Province
- Spouse: Married
- Children: a son.
- Education: University graduate.

Song Aiguo (born 1954) is a retired Chinese Ambassador.

- From 1979 to 1984 he was Third Secretary in the Department of West Asian and North African Affairs, in the Ministry of Foreign Affairs of the People's Republic of China
- From 1984 to 1990 he was Third Secretary, Second Secretary, First Secretary in Ankara.
- From 1990 to 1993 he was deputy director, Director, Department of West Asian and North African Affairsin the Ministry of Foreign Affairs of the People's Republic of China.
- From 1993 to 1996 he was Counselor, in Ankara.
- From 1996 to 2000 he was Counselor, Deputy Director-General, Department of West Asian and North African Affairs, in the Ministry of Foreign Affairs of the People's Republic of China.
- From 2000 to 2003 he was ambassador in Nicosia (Cyprus).
- From 2003 to 2006 he was ambassador in Ankara (Turkey).
- From 2006 to 2010 he was Director-General, Department of West Asian and North African Affairs, in the Ministry of Foreign Affairs of the People's Republic of China.
- Since October 2010 he is ambassador in Cairo and Representative to the Arab League.
