= Yu Hongyang =

Chinese Ambassador to Amman (Jordan) from October 2008 to July 2010

- 郁红阳

Chinese Ambassador to Turkey
- In office July 2014 – December 2018
- Preceded by: Gong Xiaosheng
- Succeeded by: Deng Li

Chinese Ambassador to Iran
- In office July 2010 – May 2014
- Preceded by: Xie Xiaoyan
- Succeeded by: Pang Sen

Chinese Ambassador to Jordan
- In office October 2008 – July 2010
- Preceded by: Gong Xiaosheng
- Succeeded by: Yue Xiaoyong

Personal details
- Born: October 1957 (age 68–69) Jiangsu Province, China
- Education: Bachelor's degree

Yu Hongyang (born October 1957) is a Chinese ambassador. From October 2008 to July 2010 he was ambassador to Amman (Jordan). From July 2010 to May 2014 he was ambassador to Tehran (Iran). Between July 2014 and December 2018, he was China's ambassador in Ankara (Turkey)

== Biography ==
Yu was born in Jiangsu Province in October 1957 and graduated from university. He later pursued advanced studies at Georgetown University in the United States. Yu began his diplomatic career in 1981 when he joined the Embassy of China in Iran, serving in a series of diplomatic positions.

After returning to Beijing, he worked in the Department of Asian and African Affairs of the Ministry of Foreign Affairs of the People's Republic of China, where he successively held posts including staff member, deputy division director, first secretary, and division director. Between 1990 and 2001, Yu served multiple assignments at the Chinese embassy in Iran, including third secretary, second secretary, and counsellor. Following a subsequent appointment at the Ministry of Foreign Affairs, he undertook further diplomatic training at Georgetown University from 2002 to 2003.

From April 2003 to April 2006, Yu served as Consul-General of China in Istanbul. He then returned to the Ministry of Foreign Affairs and was appointed counsellor and later deputy director-general of the Department of Asian and African Affairs. In October 2008, Yu was appointed Ambassador Extraordinary and Plenipotentiary of the People's Republic of China to the Hashemite Kingdom of Jordan, serving until October 2010. He was subsequently appointed Ambassador to the Islamic Republic of Iran from December 2010 to April 2014. In July 2014, Yu became Ambassador Extraordinary and Plenipotentiary of the People's Republic of China to the Republic of Turkey, serving until December 2018.

Diplomatic posts
Preceded by Gong Xiaosheng	Ambassador of China to Turkey; July 2014 – December 2018	Succeeded by Deng Li
Preceded by Xie Xiaoyan	Ambassador of China to Iran; December 2010 – April 2014	Succeeded by Pang Sen
Preceded by Gong Xiaosheng	Ambassador of China to Jordan; October 2008 – October 2010	Succeeded by Yue Xiaoyong
Preceded by Xu Kun	Consul-General of China in Istanbul; April 2003 – April 2006	Succeeded by Zhang Zhiliang
