= Embassy of China, Ankara =

Embassy of the People's Republic of China in Turkey 中华人民共和国驻土耳其大使馆
- Location: Ankara
- Coordinates: 39.899143°N 32.872630°E
- Ambassador: Liu Shaobin
- Website: tr.china-embassy.org

The Embassy of the People's Republic of China in Turkey (Chinese: 中华人民共和国驻土耳其大使馆; pinyin: Zhōnghuá Rénmín Gònghéguó zhù Tǔ'ěrqí dàshǐguǎn) is the diplomatic mission of China to Turkey.

== See also ==
- List of ambassadors of China to Turkey
- China–Turkey relations
