= Hulusi Fuat Tugay =

Turkish medical doctor and diplomat (1890–1967)

Personal details
- Born: Ahmet Fuat; 24 March 1890 Kadıköy, Istanbul, Ottoman Empire
- Died: 1967 (aged 76–77)
- Spouse: Emine Düriye Hanım
- Parents: Müşir Fuat Pasha (father); Ayşe Seyrandil Hanım (mother)

Hulusi Fuat Tugay (1890–1967) was a Turkish military doctor and diplomat. During the Ottoman period he served in the former post and after the establishment of the Republic of Turkey he served in the latter post. He was the first Turkish diplomat in Japan and China and served as the ambassador of Turkey in various countries, including Romania and Egypt. He is the first Turkish diplomat who was declared as the persona non grata during his ambassadorship in Egypt in 1954.

== Early life and education ==
He was born Ahmet Fuat in Kadıköy, Istanbul, on 24 March 1890. He was the youngest son of an Ottoman military commander and politician Müşir Fuat Pasha. His mother, Ayşe Seyrandil Hanım, was the second wife of Fuat Pasha.

His elder three brothers, Said, Reşit and Halil, were killed in the battles between 1912 and 1915. His another brother, Esat, was a diplomat and journalist.

Ahmet Fuat was first educated at home and then graduated from the Saint Joseph High School, İstanbul, in 1904. Next he was educated at the Saint Michel High School between 1904 and 1908. He continued his studies at the Galatasaray High School from 1908 to 1910. During this period he was renamed as Hulusi Fuat since there were four students named Ahmet Fuat at the school.

He attended the Military Medical School from 1910, but his education paused due to World War I. He graduated from the school on 4 September 1916 after the end of the Gallipoli campaign.

== Career and activities ==
Hulusi Fuat participated in World War I and was appointed as a medical assistant to the newly established Hilal-i Ahmer Hospital in Istanbul in 1915. He continued to work at the hospital's branches in Aleppo and in Jerusalem until the beginning of the Gallipoli campaign in 1915 and fought in the battle. Immediately after his graduation from the Military Medical School Lieutenant Hulusi Fuat was named by the Ottoman General Staff as an inspector to Austro-Hungarian hospitals to find out where the Ottoman soldiers were being treated in Vienna in the period between 1916 and 1917. Following his return to Istanbul he worked as a doctor and went to Heidelberg in 1921 where he worked at the pharmacology institute of Heidelberg University.

Hulusi Fuat ended his medical career after his marriage in 1921 and joined the diplomatic mission. His first diplomatic post was the secretary at the Turkish diplomatic mission in Copenhagen between 1922 and 1923. He was the envoy of Turkey to Japan which he held between 1925 and 1929. He was named as the chargé d'affaires of Turkey to China in 1929 when Turkey opened its diplomatic mission in Nanjing. However, the mission had to be closed in 1931 due to financial reasons, and he left China on 2 August 1931. He was the envoy of Turkey to Albania from 1938 to 1939 and the envoy of Turkey to Spain and Portugal between 1939 and 1943. Tugay was appointed ambassador of Turkey to China in 1944 and remained in office until 1947. He was the ambassador of Turkey to Romania between 1947 and 1949.

Tugay was named as the ambassador of Turkey to Egypt on 31 December 1950 which he held until 5 January 1954. His tenure was without any conflict during the reign of King Farouk, but after the monarchical state of Egypt was ended by the Free Officers Movement in 1952 the Egyptian press began to publish many articles against Togay and his wife, Emine Düriye Hanım, who was a member of the Muhammad Ali dynasty. One of such articles was written by Mohamed Hassanein Heikal in the 22 November 1953 issue of Akhbar el-Yom with the title This Ambassador Must Go.

On 4 January 1954 Tugay was declared by the Egyptian revolutionary government led by Mohamed Naguib as a persona non-grata, becoming the first Turkish diplomat who was given this status. Therefore, he was asked to leave the country on 4 January due to his "undiplomatic behavior", and his wife, Emine Düriye Hanım, was accused of involving in plots against the government. This incident is known as the Tugay affair. Immediately after this incident the Egyptian government publicly stated that Turkish policy was "anti-Arab."

== Personal life and death ==
Hulusi Fuat married Emine Düriye Hanım (1897–1973), a member of the Egyptian royal family, in Munich on 15 September 1921. She was the daughter of Princess Nimetullah Hanim, a daughter of Khedive Ismail Pasha, and Mahmud Muhtar Pasha. Therefore, Emine Düriye Hanım was the cousin of King Farouk, ruler of the Kingdom of Egypt between 1936 and 1952, and niece of King Fuad who ruled the Kingdom between 1922 and 1936.

Tugay died in 1967.

=== Legacy ===
His biography was published by Bedii Nuri Şehsuvaroğlu as a book, Hekim Bir Siyasimizin Portresi: Büyükelçi Doktor A. Hulusi Fuad (Turkish: Portrait of a Physician Politician: Ambassador Doctor A. Hulusi Fuad), in 1972.
