= Abdulkadir Emin Önen =

Turkish politician (born 1976)

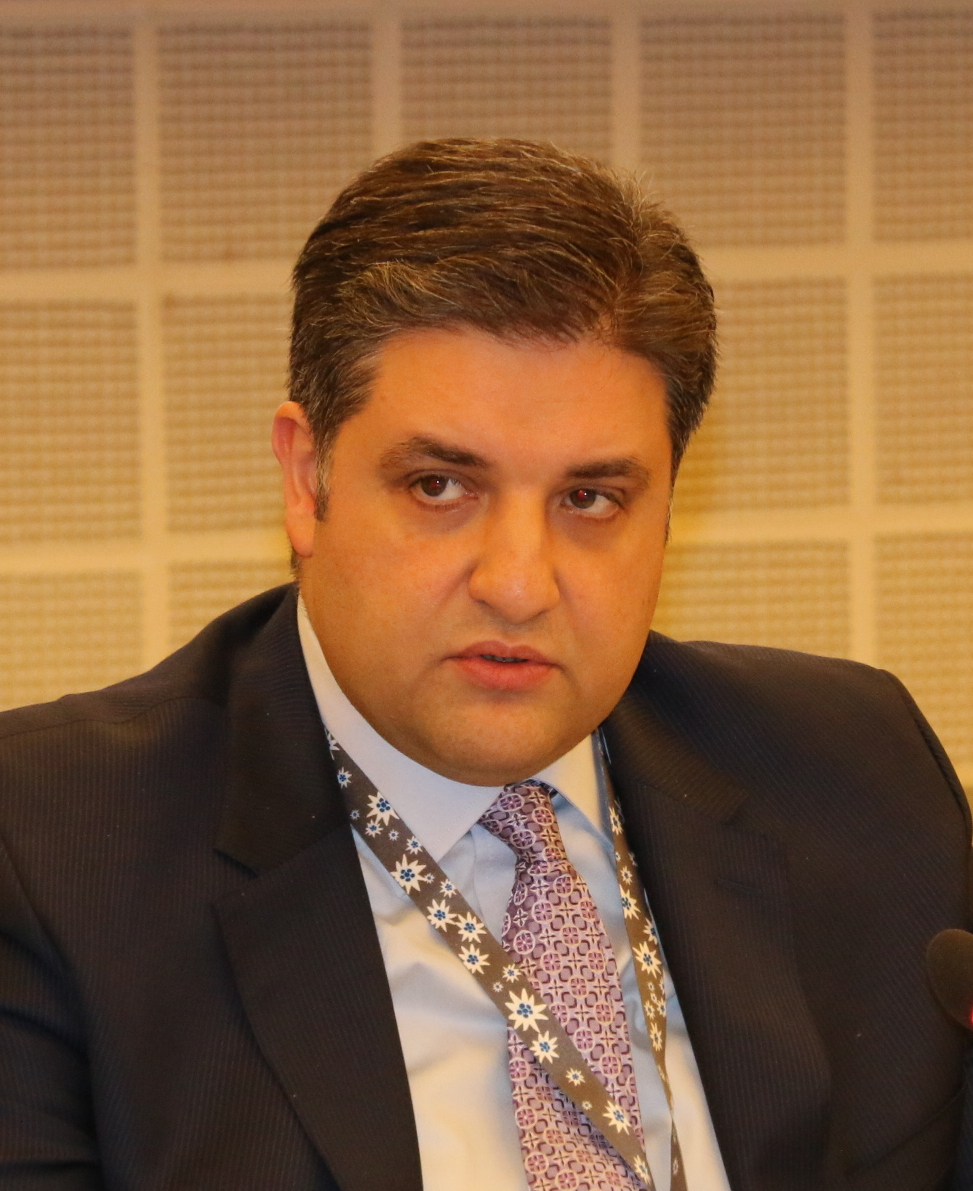
- Önen in 2014

Turkish Ambassador to China
- In office 1 December 2017 – 15 March 2023
- Preceded by: Ali Murat Ersoy
- Succeeded by: İsmail Hakkı Musa

Member of the Grand National Assembly
- Incumbent
- Assumed office 2 June 2023
- Constituency: Şanlıurfa (2023)
- In office 23 July 2007 – 23 April 2015
- Constituency: Şanlıurfa (2007, 2011)

Personal details
- Born: 15 March 1976 (age 50) Ankara, Turkey
- Party: Justice and Development Party

Abdulkadir Emin Önen (born 15 March 1976) is a Turkish politician and diplomat who has served as the Ambassador of Turkey to China.

He was elected to the Grand National Assembly of Turkey representing Şanlıurfa in 2007, 2011 and 2023.

In addition to his native Turkish, he knows English and Chinese.
