= Zhai Jun =

Chinese diplomat

His excellency Zhai Jun
- 翟隽
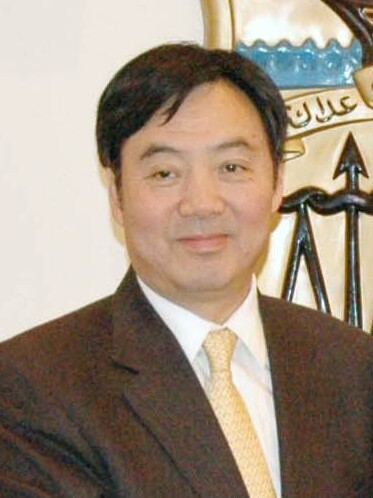

Chinese Ambassador to France
- In office 2014–2019
- Preceded by: Kong Quan
- Succeeded by: Lu Shaye

Chinese Ambassador to Libya
- In office 1997–2000
- Preceded by: Qin Hongguo
- Succeeded by: Luo Xingwu

Deputy Foreign Minister
- In office 2009–2014

China's Special Envoy on the Middle East Issue
- Incumbent
- Assumed office September 2019
- Preceded by: Gong Xiaosheng

Personal details
- Born: December 1954 (age 71) Qingyuan, Hebei, China
- Party: Chinese Communist Party
- Children: 1 (son)
- Education: Beijing Foreign Language School; Cairo University
- Occupation: Diplomat

Zhai Jun (Chinese: 翟隽; born December 1954) is a Chinese diplomat, who has served as China's Special Envoy on the Middle East Issue since 2019. As of 2022, he was the incumbent in the position. Previously, he served as Deputy Foreign Minister from 2009 to 2014, and was appointed Chinese ambassador to France in January 2014, replacing Kong Quan.

== Early life ==
Born on 1954 in Qingyuan, Hebei, Zhai learned Arabic since childhood. After graduating from Beijing Foreign Language School in November 1972, he was sent by the Ministry of Foreign Affairs to study in the Arabic Department of the Faculty of Literature at Cairo University in Egypt and graduated in 1975.

== Diplomatic career ==
Upon his graduation, he returned to China and worked in the Ministry of Foreign Affairs where he worked in the translation office, the Department of West Asia and North Africa, and at Chinese embassies in South Yemen and Saudi Arabia. He later worked as a counsellor at the Chinese embassy in Saudi Arabia.

In 1996, he served as counselor of the West Asia and North Africa Department of the Ministry of Foreign Affairs. In December 1997, he served as the Chinese Ambassador to Libya. After his return to China in 2000, he served as Deputy Director-General of the Department of West Asia and North Africa and on the same year, he served as a member of the Standing Committee of the Zhenjiang Municipal Committee in Jiangsu Province. In 2001, he served as Director-General of the Foreign Affairs Bureau of the Ministry of Foreign Affairs and in 2003, he appointed as the Director-General of the Department of West Asia and North Africa.

In 2006, he was promoted to Assistant Minister of Foreign Affairs and in 2009, he was promoted to Deputy Minister of Foreign Affairs. From January 2014 to June 2019, he served the Chinese Ambassador to France and Monaco.

On September 2, 2019, he was appointed as the Chinese Special Envoy to the Middle East, succeeding Gong Xiaosheng.

== Personal life ==
He is married and has one son.

== Awards ==
- Grand Officer of the Legion of Honour (France, 2019)

Diplomatic posts
Previous: Kong Quan	Chinese Ambassador to France and Monaco; 2014–2019	Next: Lu Shaye
Preceded by Qin Hongguo (秦鸿国)	Chinese Ambassador to Libya; 1997-2000	Succeeded by Luo Xingwu (罗兴武)
