= Gong Xiaosheng =

Chinese ambassador (born 1953)

- 宫小生

People's Republic of China Ambassador to the Palestinian National Authority
- In office November 2002 – July 2005
- Preceded by: Wu Jiuhong
- Succeeded by: Yang Weiguo

Chinese Ambassador to Jordan
- In office September 2006 – October 2008
- Preceded by: Luo Xingwu
- Succeeded by: Yu Hongyang

Chinese Ambassador to Turkey
- In office October 2008 – July 2014
- Preceded by: pl:Sun Guoxiang
- Succeeded by: Yu Hongyang

China's Special Envoy on the Middle East Issue
- In office September 5, 2014 – September 2019
- Preceded by: Wu Sike
- Succeeded by: Zhai Jun

Personal details
- Born: 1953 (age 72–73) Shandong, China

Gong Xiaosheng (born 1953) is a Chinese ambassador.

- From 1980 to 1984 he was Third Secretary in Cairo (Egypt).
- From November 2002 to July 2005 he was ambassador to the Palestinian National Authority.
- From September 2006 to October 2008 he was ambassador to Amman (Jordan).
- From October 2008 to July 2014 was ambassador in Ankara (Turkey).
- From September 5, 2014 until September 2019 he was China's Special Envoy on the Middle East Issue.
