= Global Development Initiative =

Chinese multilateral development initiative

- Simplified Chinese: 全球发展倡议
- Traditional Chinese: 全球發展倡議
Transcriptions
Standard Mandarin
- Hanyu Pinyin: Quánqiú Fāzhǎn Chàngyì

Global Development Initiative — Building on 2030 SDGs for Stronger, Greener and Healthier Global Development
- Simplified Chinese: 全球发展倡议：加快落实2030年可持续发展议程，推动实现更加强劲、绿色、健康的全球发展
- Traditional Chinese: 全球發展倡議：加速落實2030年永續發展議程，推動更強勁、綠色、健康的全球發展
Transcriptions
Standard Mandarin
- Hanyu Pinyin: Quánqiú Fāzhǎn Chàngyì: Jiākuài Luòshí 2030 Nián Kě Chíxù Fāzhǎn Yìchéng, Tuīdòng Shíxiàn Gèngjiā Giángjìng, Lǜsè, Jiànkāng de Quánqiú Fāzhǎn

The Global Development Initiative (GDI), officially the Global Development Initiative — Building on 2030 SDGs for Stronger, Greener and Healthier Global Development, is a multilateral development initiative proposed by Chinese Communist Party general secretary Xi Jinping in 2021.

== History ==
The GDI was announced on 21 September 2021 by Xi Jinping during a video address to the general debate of the seventy-fifth session of the United Nations General Assembly.

In January 2022, China launched a group at the United Nations named "Friends of the Global Development Initiative". As of November 2023, the Xinhua News Agency reported GDI had around 100 members, while the UN group had around 70.

== Concept ==
During the launching speech of the GDI, Xi outlined six core principles for the GDI:

1. Staying committed to development as a priority
2. Staying committed to a people-centered approach
3. Staying committed to benefits for all, to leave no country and no person behind
4. Staying committed to innovation-driven development
5. Staying committed to harmony between human and nature
6. Staying committed to results-oriented actions

Xi identified GDI as a way to achieve the Sustainable Development Goals for 2030. The GDI covers areas, including ending poverty and hunger, ensuring everyone has access to affordable clean energy, reducing inequality and cutting pollution. It has also been named as a "twin engine" together with the Belt and Road Initiative.

== See also ==
- Global Civilization Initiative
- Global Security Initiative
