= China's Special Envoy on the Middle East Issue =

Position within the Chinese Foreign Ministry

Special Envoy of the Chinese Government on the Middle East Issue
- 中国政府中东问题特使
- National emblem of China
- Incumbent; Zhai Jun since 2 September 2019
- Ministry of Foreign Affairs of the People's Republic of China
- Reports to: Office of the Central Foreign Affairs Commission
- Seat: Beijing
- Inaugural holder: Wang Shijie
- Formation: September 2002

China's Special Envoy on the Middle East Issue (Chinese: 中国政府中东问题特使; pinyin: Zhōngguó Zhèngfǔ Zhōngdōng Wèntí Tèshǐ) is a special diplomatic position appointed by the Chinese Foreign Ministry. The Special Envoy focuses primarily on facilitating the Arab-Israeli peace process, although at various times, the Special Envoy has also addressed other major issues including the conflict in Syria.

== Background and underlying principles ==
During Chairman of the Chinese Communist Party Mao Zedong's leadership, Chinese foreign policy was generally supportive of Third World national liberation movements, including the Palestinian cause. Following the reform and opening up, and even more so after the end of the Cold War, China built its diplomatic relations with Israel.

In China's view, the Israeli–Palestinian conflict is a core issue because peace would contribute to the stability of the region, thereby ultimately contributing to China's ability to fuel its economic growth through access to Middle Eastern resources, markets, and energy. In 1997, China articulated its Five Principles in Support of the Middle East Peace Process:

1. Peace talks should proceed on the basis of the implementation of relevant UN resolutions on the Middle East and the land for peace principle forged at the Madrid peace conference (in 1991).

2. All signed agreements should be implemented seriously and any attempt to hinder the peace process should be avoided.

3. Terrorism and violence in all forms must be eradicated so that the security of the Mideast countries and the normal lives of their peoples can be assured.

4. As the peace process makes headway, regional economic cooperation should be strengthened and the normal lives of their peoples can be assured.

5. The international community is obliged to work together with the parties concerned in the Middle East to realize a comprehensive, just and lasting peace in the region, and China is ready to make its own effort to that end.

Those principles would go on to become the foundational principles of the Special Envoy's focus, although points of emphasis and articulations of specific positions would change over time.

The first Special Envoy appointment was declared in 2002, "at the request of several Arab states". Arab states viewed China's historic support for the Palestinian people as providing it with credibility during the peace process discussions. Israel also welcomed the formation of the Special Envoy position, recognizing that the Arab states had an appreciation for what they perceived to be more the balanced posture of China.

== Envoys ==
As of 2022, China has had five special envoys: Wang Shijie (2002 to 2006), Sun Bigan (2006 to 2009), Wu Sike (2009 to 2014), Gong Xiaosheng (2014 to 2019), and Zhai Jun (beginning in 2019).

=== Wang Shijie (2002 to 2006) ===
Wang Shijie, former Chinese Ambassador to Bahrain, Jordan and Iran was appointed the first Special Envoy in 2002. Throughout his tenure, Wang stressed that land for peace must be a guiding principle of negotiations.

In May 2003, Wang presented the Five-Point Proposal on the Middle East Peace Process and Road Map. The primary difference from the 1997 Five Principle Standpoints in Support of the Middle East Peace Process was that China became more explicit in its expectations for the creation of a Palestinian state, democratic elections for Palestine, and an international supervisory mechanism for the peace process. Wang's proposal expressly advocated for the road map for peace process, overtly criticized Israel's actions toward Palestinians, and dropped the emphasis on regional development.

In Wang's departure speech from the position, he stated, "Talking about any regret in my tenure, I should say that over three years no satisfactory process has yet been achieved and the Palestinian and Israeli people are still suffering a lot."

=== Sun Bigan (2006 to 2009) ===
Wang was succeeded by Sun Bigan in June 2006. During Sun's tenure as Special Envoy, China criticized Israel for its disproportionate use of force against Lebanon in July 2006.

=== Wu Sike (2009 to 2014) ===
In 2009, the post was taken over by Ambassador Wu Sike. Similar to his predecessors, Wu had an extensive background as China's ambassador to Middle Eastern countries.

China's position on the Middle East peace process during Wu's tenure considered largely as before, although Wu's criticisms of Israel increased as a result of Israel's blockade of Gaza and its raiding of a flotilla carrying aid while the flotilla was in international waters. Although the focus of the position continued to the peace process, Wu also sought to address the conflict in Syria and a number of other issues in the region.

=== Gong Xiaosheng (2014 to 2019) ===
Gong Xiaosheng replaced Wu Sike when Wu stepped down in September 2014. He served until September 2019. Until the appointment of a separate special envoy for issues related to Syria in 2016, Syria (like the peace process) was a major point of emphasis for Gong. As he summarized, "All the crises in the region have been entangled, and it is impossible to solve one without solving the others, especially without handling the Palestinian-Israeli conflict properly."

Beginning in 2015, Gong began highlighting the economic development of China's Belt and Road Initiative as a contribution to the peace process.

Gong criticized the United States' withdrawal from the nuclear deal with Iran, describing China's position as: "We think some deal is better than no deal."

=== Zhai Jun (2019) ===
Zhai Jun was appointed in 2019 and, as of 2022, continues to serve in this role.
