= Global Security Initiative =

Chinese government initiative

The Global Security Initiative (GSI, Chinese: 全球安全倡议) is an initiative proposed by Chinese Communist Party general secretary Xi Jinping during the annual Boao Forum on 21 April 2022. Officially, the initiative is meant to "uphold the principle of indivisible security, build a balanced, effective and sustainable security architecture, and oppose the building of national security on the basis of insecurity in other countries."

The GSI has received promotion alongside two related initiatives, namely the Global Development Initiative (GDI) and the Global Civilization Initiative (GCI), which were introduced in 2021 and 2023, respectively.

== Concept ==
The new security concept is part of the background for the GSI.

The GSI identifies six commitments: (1) common, comprehensive, cooperative, and sustainable security; (2) respect for sovereignty and territorial integrity of all countries; (3) abiding by the purpose and principles of the UN Charter; (4) taking the security concerns of all countries seriously; (5) peacefully resolving disputes between countries through dialogue; and (6) maintaining security in both traditional and non-traditional fields. The principles outlined by the Global Security Initiative are long-standing elements of China's security policy.

== History ==
The GSI was announced during the 2022 Boao Forum for Asia.

Articulations of the Global Security Initiative have included little operational detail. It has been described as a "concrete manifestation" of Xi Jinping Thought on Diplomacy.

China issued a further statement of the initiative, outlining principles, priorities and platforms, in a concept paper on 21 February 2023. The GSI has since sponsored the Global Public Security Co-operation Forum to become China's largest international security event, showing various technologies used in mass surveillance.

Africa has been central to first applications of the GSI, with some analysts describing it as a "testing ground" for the GSI. At the opening ceremony of the 2024 FOCAC Summit, Xi Jinping pledged "RMB1 billion yuan of grants in military assistance, (...) training for 6,000 military personnel and 1,000 police and law enforcement officers from Africa", identifying the resulting FOCAC 2025-2027 Action Plan as an early example of GSI implementation. By 2025, some 40 African countries had collaborated with Chinese police institutions with notable examples including a 2022 Ethio-Sino security agreement for the protection of BRI infrastructure (e.g. the Addis Ababa-Djibouti Standard Gauge Railway (SGR)), a 2024 Ethiopia China Law Enforcement Centre, law enforcement training for Somali security officials in July 2025, or training for police force around the Chinese-funded Mombasa-Nairobi SGR.

== Reception ==
Analysts have described the GSI as a way of increasing China's global influence. In terms of temporality, it represents a forward-looking initiative, while simultaneously being firmly rooted in long-established principles of Chinese foreign policy.

== See also ==
- Global Development Initiative
- Global Civilization Initiative
