= Liu Shaobin =

Chinese diplomat

- 刘少宾

Chinese Ambassador to Turkey
- In office 5 November 2020 – December 2024
- Preceded by: Deng Li
- Succeeded by: Jiang Xuebin

Personal details
- Born: August 1963 (age 63) China
- Party: Chinese Communist Party
- Education: Wuhan University

Chinese name
- Simplified Chinese: 刘少宾
- Traditional Chinese: 劉少賓
Transcriptions
Standard Mandarin
- Hanyu Pinyin: Liú Shàobīn

Liu Shaobin (Chinese: 刘少宾; born August 1963) is a Chinese diplomat who served as the Chinese Ambassador to Turkey from November 2020 to December 2024.

== Early life and education ==
Liu was born in August 1963, and graduated from the Department of Japanese, Wuhan University.

== Political career ==
Liu joined the Foreign Service and has served primarily in East Asia. In 2018, he became director of the Department of Foreign Security Affairs of the Ministry of Foreign Affairs.

On 5 October 2020, the Standing Committee of the National People's Congress appointed him Chinese Ambassador to Turkey according to the decision of the 13th National People's Congress Standing Committee, succeeding Deng Li.

Diplomatic posts
Preceded by Deng Li	Chinese Ambassador to Turkey; 2020–present	Incumbent
