= Pakistan-China Joint Consultative Mechanism =

Pakistan-China Joint Consultative Mechanism (JCM)
- Location: Islamabad, Pakistan; Beijing, China
- Opened: March 2019

The Pakistan-China Joint Consultative Mechanism (JCM) is a high-level diplomatic initiative between Pakistan and China. The JCM facilitates discussions on various topics including the China Pakistan Economic Corridor (CPEC), regional peace and stability.

== Meetings ==
=== First ===
The inaugural meeting of Pakistan-China JCM was held in Beijing in March 2019. During this meeting, all mainstream political parties of Pakistan showed exemplary consensus to support the China Pakistan Economic Corridor (CPEC).

=== Second ===
The second meeting of Pakistan-China JCM was virtually held in August 2020. During the meeting, Pboth countries agreed to push CPEC into its second phase, beyond infrastructure and energy, through broader economic and social development, agricultural modernization, including rural revitalization, industrialization, and green growth.

=== Third ===
The third meeting of Pakistan-China JCM was held on 21 June 2024 in Islamabad. The meeting was co-chaired by Senator Ishaq Dar, the Foreign Minister, and Liu Jianchao, the head of the International Department of the Chinese Communist Party. Delegates from all the prominent political parties in Pakistan were present at the meeting.
