= Dai Bingguo =

Chinese diplomat

- 戴秉国
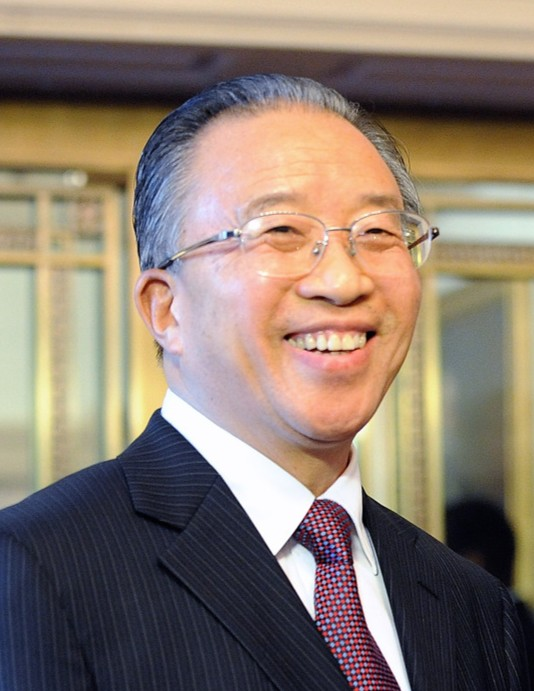
- Dai in 2009

Chairman of Jinan University
- In office 15 November 2013 – 15 November 2019
- President: Hu Jun → Song Xianzhong
- Preceded by: Qian Weichang

State Councilor of China
- In office 17 March 2008 – 16 March 2013
- Premier: Wen Jiabao

Director of the Office of the Central Foreign Affairs Leading Group
- In office April 2005 – August 2013
- General Secretary: Hu Jintao → Xi Jinping
- Foreign Minister: Li Zhaoxing → Yang Jiechi
- Preceded by: Liu Huaqiu
- Succeeded by: Yang Jiechi

Head of the International Department of the Chinese Communist Party
- In office August 1997 – March 2003
- General Secretary: Jiang Zemin; Hu Jintao
- Preceded by: Li Shuzheng
- Succeeded by: Wang Jiarui

Ambassador of China to Hungary
- In office November 1989 – February 1992
- Preceded by: Zhu Ankang
- Succeeded by: Chen Zhiliu

Personal details
- Born: March 31, 1941 (age 85) Yinjiang County, Guizhou, Republic of China
- Party: Chinese Communist Party
- Education: Sichuan University; China Foreign Affairs University

Dai Bingguo (simplified Chinese: 戴秉国; traditional Chinese: 戴秉國; pinyin: Dài Bǐngguó; born March 31, 1941) is a Chinese politician and professional diplomat. Starting in 2008, Dai emerged as one of the foremost and highest-ranking figures of Chinese foreign policy in the Hu Jintao administration.

A graduate of Sichuan University, majoring in Russian language, Dai was instrumental in the normalization of diplomatic relations between China and the Soviet Union. Between 1989 and 1991 Dai served as the Chinese ambassador to Hungary. He then served in a succession of roles in the Department of Foreign Affairs. He served as a State Councilor, director of the Office of the Central Foreign Affairs Leading Group of CCP Central Committee, an office that acts as the primary foreign affairs organ of the Chinese Communist Party, and director of the general office of the National Security Leadership Group of the CCP Central Committee, in which he serves in the capacity as a national security advisor to the CCP General Secretary.

== Early life ==
Dai Bingguo was born on 31 March 1941 into a Tujia family in a remote village in Yinjiang County, Guizhou. His family descended from ancestors who had migrated from Ji'an, Jiangxi during the late Ming dynasty and integrated with the local population in Guizhou. Raised in a traditional four-generation rural household living under impoverished circumstances, Dai began working in the fields at age five. His childhood was marked by severe hardship and personal loss; three of his six siblings died young from disease, overwork and extreme poverty. His early education included studying classical Confucian texts in a local private school, a foundation preserved by his father during political turmoil. Because his home county lacked a high school at the time, Dai had to walk barefoot for three days across more than 150 km of mountainous terrain to reach the school, a journey he repeated twice a year over three years.

In 1959, Dai became the only student from his middle school to be admitted to an out-of-province key university, entering the Department of Foreign Languages at Sichuan University to major in Russian. Lacking financial resources, he gathered travel funds from local authorities, family members and high school teachers, arriving in Chengdu nine days after the term began. Following graduation, he studied at the China Foreign Affairs University (CFAU) from 1964 to 1965. Shortly after, he spent a year in Liuyang, Hunan, taking part in the Socialist Education Movement.

== Diplomatic career ==
In 1966, he joined the Ministry of Foreign Affairs and worked in the Department of Soviet and Eastern European Affairs. In 1969, he was posted as an attaché at the Chinese Embassy in the Soviet Union, where he served until 1973. He joined the Chinese Communist Party in June 1973. After returning to China, he spent a year performing labour at the Ministry's May 7 Cadre School before returning to the Department of Soviet and Eastern European Affairs. Between 1974 and 1985, he served successively as a staff member, deputy division director, and division director. He was also deputy head of the Ministry's Sino-Soviet Negotiation Office from 1980 to 1982 and served with the Central Party Rectification Steering Committee's liaison group in Anhui from 1983 to 1985. He became deputy director-general of the department in 1985, director-general in 1986 and served as China's ambassador to Hungary from 1989 to 1991.

Following his ambassadorial tenure, he returned to Beijing as Assistant Minister of Foreign Affairs and a member of the ministry's Party Committee from 1991 to 1993. He then served as Vice Minister of Foreign Affairs and a member of the Party Committee from 1993 to 1995. In June 1995, Dai was transferred from the "foreign affairs system" of the State Council to the "international liaison system" of the Central Committee of the CCP and became Vice Director of the International Department of the Central Committee of the CCP. In August 1997, on the eve of the 15th CCP National Congress, he was promoted to Director of the International Department. In May 2003, Dai returned to the Foreign Ministry and served as Vice Minister until April 2008, being responsible for handling the North Korean nuclear crisis.

=== Foreign affairs leader ===
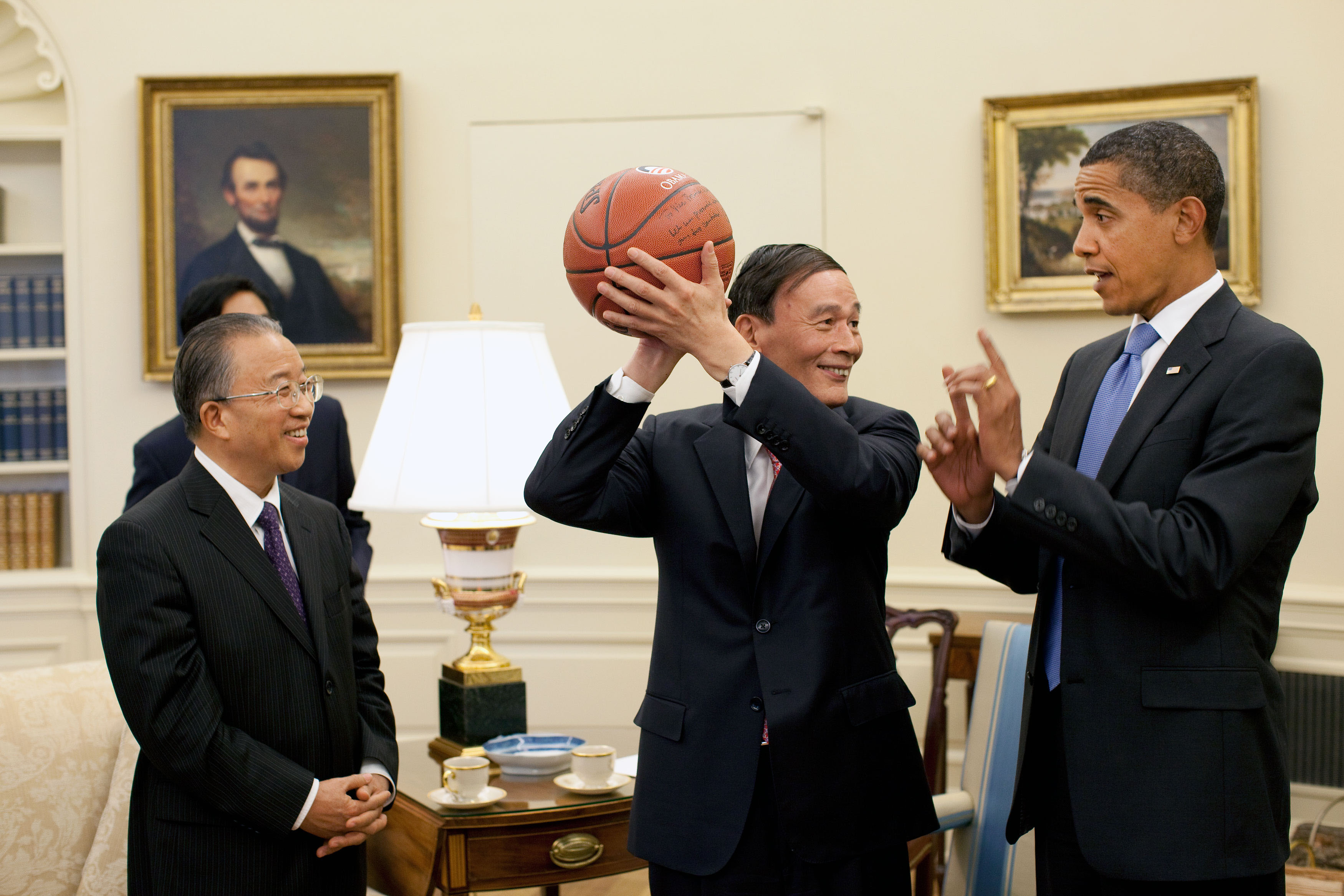
Wang Qishan and former State Councilor Dai Bingguo holding a basketball in the Oval Office with U.S. President Barack Obama (2009)

In March 2008, he was appointed State Councillor and Party group member on the State Council. On 8 July 2009, Dai replaced Chinese President Hu Jintao at the G8 summit in L'Aquila, Italy after Hu had to leave the summit because of July 2009 Ürümqi riots involving Uyghurs and Han Chinese.

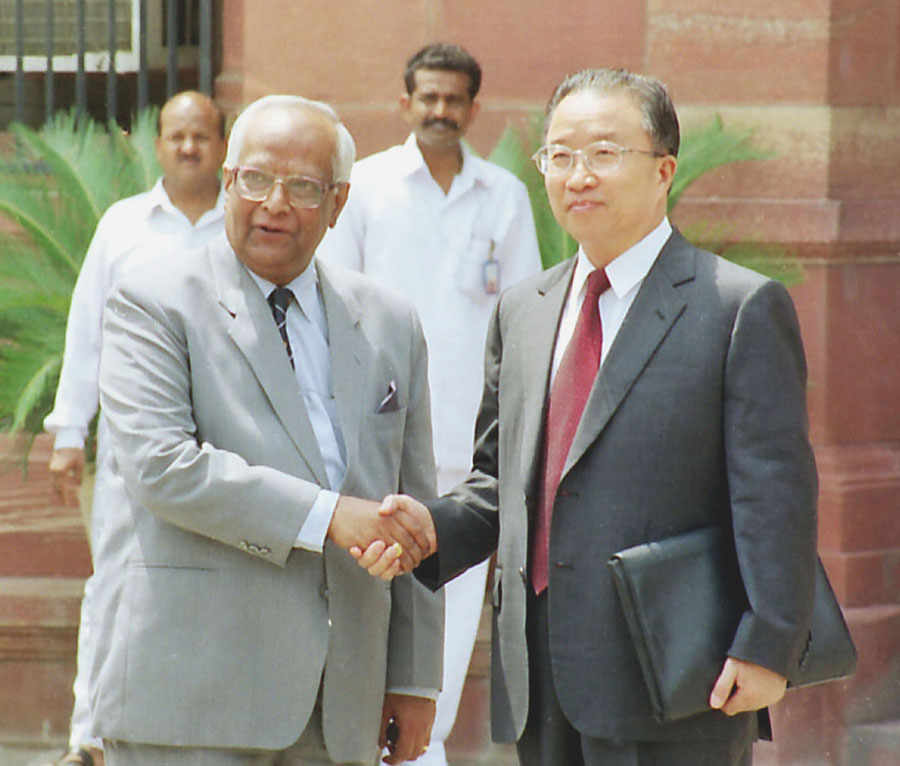
Dai Bingguo (right) and J.N. Dixit in 2004, 3rd round of talks of the Special Representative mechanism on the India-China boundary question

Dai was appointed by Hu as his special representative to chair the Strategic Track of the U.S.-China Strategic and Economic Dialogue for the Chinese side in 2009. From 2003 to 2013, he served as China's Special Representative for the India–China boundary question. After leaving office, he argued in 2017 that the border dispute could be resolved through Indian concessions on Tawang, a suggestion dismissed by Indian officials as impractical and impossible as Tawang is considered an integral part of the Indian state of Arunachal Pradesh.

During Hu Jintao's administration, Dai developed the concept of China's "core interests" to define the primary goals that determine the country's foreign policy choices. The core interests are: maintaining the power of the Communist Party, continuing China's social and economic growth, and preservation of China's sovereignty and territorial integrity. China also views these core interests as red lines that other countries' behavior should not cross.

On 7 October 2012, Dai met with Hsieh Chang-ting, the former Premier of the Republic of China, who was visiting mainland China in his private capacity, in Beijing. He and Hsieh exchanged views on topics of mutual interest.

In March 2013, Dai Bingguo retired as a State Councillor at the end of his term and retired from politics in China.

=== Post-retirement ===
In 2016, prior to the South China Sea Arbitration ruling, Dai stated that the ruling of the arbitration "amounts to nothing more than a piece of paper." Dai became chairman of Jinan University in November 2013, and he stepped down as chairman in November 2019.

In September 2019, Dai Bingguo represented Chinese President Xi Jinping to attend memorial ceremonies held by the French government in Paris for late President Jacques Chirac.

== Personal ==
Dai is married to Huang Hao, the daughter of former Culture Minister Huang Zhen. The couple have a son.

== Awards and honors ==
- Order of Friendship (Russia, 28 July 2011)
- Medal of Pushkin (Russia, 31 October 2007)
- Grand Order of King Dmitar Zvonimir (Croatia, 9 May 2007)

Party political offices
Preceded by Liu Huaqiu	Secretary-general of the Foreign Affairs Leading Small Group; 2005–2013	Succeeded by Yang Jiechi
Preceded by Liu Huaqiu	Secretary-general of the Central Leading Group for Taiwan Affairs; 2005–2013	Succeeded by Yang Jiechi
Preceded by Li Shuzheng	Head of the International Department of the Chinese Communist Party; 1997–2003	Succeeded by Wang Jiarui
Academic offices
Preceded by Qian Weichang (until 2010)	Chairman of the Board of Jinan University; November 2013 －November 2019	Succeeded by Wan Gang
Diplomatic posts
Preceded by Zhu Ankang	Chinese Ambassador to Hungary; 1989–1992	Succeeded by Chen Zhiliu
