= Zhang Meifang =

Chinese diplomat

- 张美芳

Consul-General of the People's Republic of China in Belfast
- In office 2018–2024

Personal details
- Born: China
- Party: Chinese Communist Party
- Spouse: Liu Haixing
- Children: 1 (daughter)
- Education: East China Normal University (UG); University of Cambridge (MPhil)

Zhang Meifang (Chinese: 张美芳; pinyin: Zhāng Měifāng) is a Chinese diplomat who is served as the Consul General of the People's Republic of China in Belfast, United Kingdom from 2018 to 2024.

== Early life and education ==
Zhang graduated from East China Normal University and earned a Master of Philosophy's degree from the University of Cambridge. She served as a senior visiting scholar at the Johns Hopkins University. She is married to politician Liu Haixing, who is currently serving as Head of the International Department of the Chinese Communist Party (ministerial-level). The couple have a daughter.

== Career ==
Zhang has previous served in a variety of roles within China's Ministry of Foreign Affairs, including as first secretary at the Chinese Permanent Mission to the United Nations from 1997 to 2001, first secretary at the Chinese Embassy in France from 2001 to 2004, and deputy consul general at the Chinese consulates in Toronto from 2008 to 2013 and New York from 2013 to 2018.

In December 2018, she was appointed as the Chinese consul general in Belfast. Her tenure ended on July 2024.

=== Statements ===
On 12 March 2020, Zhang promoted the conspiracy theory that claimed the US army introduced COVID-19 to China on Twitter.

According to the online statistics collected by the German Marshall Fund, Zhang had engaged in extensive forwarding of pro-Russian and anti-Western messages in Twitter since the outbreak of the Russian invasion of Ukraine on 24 February 2022. One of them being a false news, first shared by a pro-China Twitter account, that President of Ukraine Volodymyr Zelenskyy fled to Poland during the invasion.

On 14 August 2022, following Speaker of the United States House of Representatives Nancy Pelosi's visit to Taiwan on 2 August 2022, CGTN published an opinion piece by Zhang where she stated that "the one-China principle was violated by a foolish action of a desperate nation, desperate to distract its own people from troubles at home" and the "Taiwan region is not a pawn to be played in some deviant global chess game. No nation will sit idly by in such matters."

On 23 August, Zhang shared a post on Twitter listing the wars participated by the United States as "the history of American aggression in a snapshot!" The list contained wars that the United States did not start such as the American Revolutionary War, World War I, World War II and the Korean War, with many online users questioning why Zhang considered World War II as American aggression despite the United States entering the war after the attack on Pearl Harbor by Japan, as well as providing military aid to China during the Second Sino-Japanese War. As the post resulted in heated commentary, it was deleted without any explanation.

On 4 February 2023, following the shootdown of a suspected Chinese spy balloon which flew across Canada and the United States by the United States Air Force, Zhang joked about it on Twitter stating that "perhaps China was simply giving the US a balloon, much like one would give a child to make them feel better" and if anyone else "finds this balloon fiasco to be nothing more than a bunch of hot air?"

On 13 February, in the aftermath of the devastating Turkey–Syria earthquake on 6 February, Zhang uploaded a video to Twitter that inaccurately claimed that the 1915 Çanakkale Bridge withstood the earthquake thanks to Chinese technology. Zhang wrote, "The bridge built by China in Turkey's withstood the earthquake #ChinaTech." She also falsely claimed that "a subsidiary of Shudao Group is the sole participant in the construction." However, the bridge was built by South Korean conglomerate DL E&C along with Turkish conglomerate Limak Holding as well as South Korean company SK Group and Turkish company Yapi Merkezi while China's Sichuan Road and Bridge Group was only responsible for the installation of the bridge's steel box girders in December 2020. The bridge was also unlikely to be in any danger from the earthquake, as it is located approximately 950 kilometers (590 miles) northwest from Kahramanmaras, the city closest to the quake's epicenter. The video had been viewed more than 200,000 times before it was deleted the next day. The official Twitter account of the Chinese Embassy in France also forwarded Zhang's tweet, but deleted it after learning the relevant facts.

== See also ==
- Wolf warrior diplomacy
