= Office of the Central Foreign Affairs Commission =

Chinese Communist Party body

- 中央外事工作委员会办公室
- Emblem of the Chinese Communist Party

Agency overview
- Formed: 1981
- Type: Administrative agency of the Central Foreign Affairs Commission
- Jurisdiction: Chinese Communist Party
- Headquarters: Zhongnanhai, Beijing
- Agency executives: Wang Yi, Director; Guo Yezhou, Deputy Director; Li Kexin, Deputy Director; Zhu Qin, Deputy Director
- Parent agency: Central Foreign Affairs Commission

Chinese name
- Simplified Chinese: 中央外事工作委员会办公室
- Traditional Chinese: 中央外事工作委員會辦公室
Transcriptions
Standard Mandarin
- Hanyu Pinyin: Zhōngyāng Wàishì Gōngzuò Wěiyuánhuì Bàngōngshì

Abbreviation
- Simplified Chinese: 中央外办
- Traditional Chinese: 中央外辦
Transcriptions
Standard Mandarin
- Hanyu Pinyin: Zhōngyāng Wàibàn

Second alternative Chinese name
- Simplified Chinese: 中央外事办
- Traditional Chinese: 中央外事辦
Transcriptions
Standard Mandarin
- Hanyu Pinyin: Zhōngyāng Wàishìbàn

The Office of the Central Foreign Affairs Commission is the administrative agency of the Central Foreign Affairs Commission, a policy formulation body of the Central Committee of the Chinese Communist Party (CCP). It is the permanent body of the commission, and handles its day-to-day administrative operations.

== History ==
On 6 March 1958, the CCP Central Committee and the State Council issued a joint notice on the establishment of the CCP Central Committee Foreign Affairs Group and the State Council Foreign Affairs Office. The CCP Central Committee International Activities Steering Committee was replaced with the Central Foreign Affairs Group. Vice Premier and Minister of Foreign Affairs Chen Yi was appointed as the group leader, responsible for all foreign affairs. In the State Council, a corresponding State Council Foreign Affairs Office was established, with Chen Yi as the director and Liao Chengzhi, Liu Ningyi (Deputy Head of the International Department of the CCP Central Committee), Kong Yuan (Deputy Head of a certain department of the CCP Central Committee), and Zhang Yan (deputy director of the Premier's Office in charge of foreign affairs) as deputy directors. The office was responsible for the work of the Ministry of Foreign Affairs, the Foreign Cultural Liaison Committee, and the Overseas Chinese Affairs Committee, and was also responsible for foreign trade policies.

In September 1961, the Central Committee approved the establishment of a "Wives' Foreign Affairs Activities Guidance Group" under the State Council Foreign Affairs Office. The members were: Liu Xinquan (Assistant Minister of Foreign Affairs and Director of the Personnel Department), Zhang Qian, Guo Jian (wife of Du Ganquan, deputy director of the State Administration of Foreign Economic Relations), Gong Pusheng, Yu Peiwen, Hao Zhiping, Ding Xuesong (Head of the Secretary Group of the State Council Foreign Affairs Office), and Wu Qing. Kong Yuan was the convener of the group, and Zhang Qian was the deputy leader. In October 1961, a national intelligence work conference was held with participants from the Central Investigation Department, the Ministry of Public Security, the Ministry of Foreign Affairs, the Intelligence Department of the General Staff of the People's Liberation Army, the General Political Department of the People's Liberation Army, the Foreign Affairs Office of the State Council and the Overseas Chinese Affairs Commission.

During the Cultural Revolution, the Central Foreign Affairs Group was abolished. In June 1970, the State Council streamlined its institutions and abolished the State Council Foreign Affairs Office, with its operations incorporated into the Ministry of Foreign Affairs. In 1981, the CCP Central Committee decided to restore the Central Foreign Affairs Leading Group with Li Xiannian as group leader and Wan Li as deputy group leader. In 1988, according to the State Council Institutional Reform Plan adopted at the first session of the 7th National People's Congress, the State Council Foreign Affairs Office was established to take charge of the specific affairs of the Central Foreign Affairs Leading Group. In August 1998, the CCP Central Committee and the State Council decided to abolish the State Council Foreign Affairs Office and establish the Central Foreign Affairs Office. The Central Foreign Affairs Office, as the office of the Central Foreign Affairs Leading Group, was included in the sequence of agencies directly under the CCP Central Committee.

In September 2000, the CCP Central Committee decided to establish the Central National Security Leading Group to work together with the Central Foreign Affairs Leading Group, with Jiang Zemin as the group leader, Qian Qichen as the deputy group leader, and Liu Huaqiu as the director of the Office of the Central Foreign Affairs Leading Group and the Office of the Central National Security Leading Group. In the second half of 2012, the central government established the Central Leading Group for Ocean Rights and Interests to be responsible for the discussion and coordination of ocean rights and interests affairs. The Central Leading Group for Ocean Rights and Interests established an office, the Central Leading Group for Ocean Rights and Interests Office, which is co-located with the Central Leading Group for Foreign Affairs Office. After the establishment of the Central National Security Commission in 2014, the Central Foreign Affairs Leading Group no longer retained the name of the Central National Security Leading Group. The Office of the Central Foreign Affairs Leading Group also no longer retained the name of the Office of the Central National Security Leading Group.

The Plan for Deepening the Reform of the Party and State Institutions issued by the CCP Central Committee in March 2018 stated that the Central Leading Group for Foreign Affairs would be upgraded to the Central Foreign Affairs Commission. The plan also stipulated: "There will no longer be a central leading group for safeguarding maritime rights and interests. In order to resolutely safeguard national sovereignty and maritime rights and interests, better coordinate the resources and strength of diplomatic and foreign affairs departments and maritime-related departments, the work of safeguarding maritime rights and interests will be included in the overall planning and deployment of the central foreign affairs work. There will no longer be a central leading group for safeguarding maritime rights and interests. The relevant responsibilities will be entrusted to the Central Foreign Affairs Commission and its office. An office for safeguarding maritime rights and interests will be set up within the office of the Central Foreign Affairs Commission." "After the adjustment, the main responsibilities of the Central Foreign Affairs Commission and its office in safeguarding maritime rights and interests are to organize, coordinate, guide and urge all relevant parties to implement the decisions and arrangements of the Party Central Committee on safeguarding maritime rights and interests, collect, summarize, analyze and judge intelligence information related to national maritime rights and interests, coordinate responses to emergencies, organize research on major issues in safeguarding maritime rights and interests and put forward countermeasures and suggestions, etc."

== Functions ==
The Office of the Central Foreign Affairs Commission is its administrative agency, operating secretively like its parent body. The Office is responsible for executing and coordinating the implementation of the decisions and directives of the commission. It additionally conducts research and makes suggestions on international relations, drafts and oversees foreign-related laws and regulations, handles foreign-related inquiries from Party, state and local bodies, and organizes work on maritime rights and interests. Though the office itself is a ministerial-level institution, the director of the Office has been a member of the Politburo and at the deputy national-level leader. Generally, the director has greater authority than the Minister of Foreign Affairs. The director of the commission's Office, currently Wang Yi, is the top diplomat of the People's Republic of China.

== Organizational structure ==
=== Internal organization ===
- General Bureau
- Secretary Administration Bureau
- Policy Research Bureau
- Administration of Foreign Affairs
- Regional Affairs Bureau
- Bureau of Maritime Rights Protection
- Party Committee

== Leaders ==
Director of the Foreign Affairs Office of the State Council

1. Qian Yongnian (June 1988 – December 1989)
2. Liu Shuqing (December 1989 – August 1991)
3. Qi Huaiyuan (August 1991 – November 1994)
4. Liu Huaqiu (November 1994 – October 1998)

Director of the Central Foreign Affairs Office

1. Liu Huaqiu (October 1998 – September 2000)

Director of the Office of the Central Foreign Affairs Leading Group and the Office of the Central National Security Leading Group

1. Liu Huaqiu (September 2000 – April 2005)
2. Dai Bingguo (April 2005 – August 2013, State Councilor and concurrently from March 2008 to March 2013)
3. Yang Jiechi (August 2013 – March 2018, concurrently State Councilor [concurrently until October 2017], member of the Politburo and concurrently State Councilor since October 2017)

Director of the Office of the Central Foreign Affairs Commission

1. Yang Jiechi (March 2018 – December 2022, member of the Politburo concurrently until October 2022)
2. Wang Yi (January 2023 – Incumbent, member of the Politburo and concurrently Minister of Foreign Affairs since July 2023)
