= Department of Press, Communication and Public Diplomacy =

Chinese state body

- 中华人民共和国外交部新闻司

Agency overview
- Jurisdiction: People's Republic of China
- Headquarters: No. 2, Chaoyangmen Nandajie, Chaoyang, Beijing
- Agency executives: Mao Ning, Director General; Qian Jin, Jiang Xiaoyan, Lin Jian, Guo Jiakun, Deputy Director Generals
- Parent agency: Ministry of Foreign Affairs
- Website: www.fmprc.gov.cn

The Department of Press, Communication and Public Diplomacy is a department under the Ministry of Foreign Affairs of the People's Republic of China.

== Functions ==
The department is officially responsible for releasing information on China's major diplomatic events and stating China's foreign policy, managing the press coverage of diplomatic events. It guides China's overseas diplomatic missions on information work and provides service to permanent offices of foreign media organizations and foreign journalists in China.

== Structure ==
The director-general and deputy directors-general of the department serve as spokespersons for the Ministry of Foreign Affairs.

=== Director Generals ===
- Gong Peng (1949–1964)
- Qin Jialin (1964–1965?)
- Chen Chu (1965?–1972)
- Peng Hua (1972–1974)
- Qin Jialin (1974–1976)
- Qian Qichen (1976–1982)
- Qi Huaiyuan (1983–1984)
- Ma Yuzhen (1984–1988)
- Li Zhaoxing (1988–1990)
- Wu Jianmin (1990–1994)
- Chen Jian (1994–1996)
- Shen Guofang (1996–1998)
- Zhu Bangzao (1998–2001)
- Kong Quan (2001–2006)
- Liu Jianchao (2006–January 2009)
- Ma Zhaoxu (2009–2011)
- Qin Gang (2011–January 2015)
- Liu Jianchao (January 2015–April 2015; Assistant Minister)
- Lu Kang (April 2015–July 2019)
- Hua Chunying (July 2019–January 2025; December 2021–May 2024, concurrently Assistant Minister; May 2024–January 2025, concurrently Vice Minister)
- Mao Ning (January 2025–present)
