= Office of the National Security Commission =

Chinese Communist Party agency

- 中央国家安全委员会办公室
- Emblem of the Chinese Communist Party

Agency overview
- Formed: 2023
- Type: Administrative agency of the National Security Commission
- Jurisdiction: Chinese Communist Party
- Headquarters: Zhongnanhai, Beijing
- Agency executive: Cai Qi, Director
- Parent agency: National Security Commission of the Chinese Communist Party

Office of the National Security Commission
- Simplified Chinese: 中央国家安全委员会办公室
- Traditional Chinese: 中央國家安全委員會辦公室
Transcriptions
Standard Mandarin
- Hanyu Pinyin: Zhōngyāng Guójiā Ānquán Wěiyuánhuì Bàngōngshì

Abbreviation
- Simplified Chinese: 中央国安办
- Traditional Chinese: 中央國安辦
Transcriptions
Standard Mandarin
- Hanyu Pinyin: Zhōngyāng Guó'ānbàn

The Office of the National Security Commission is the administrative agency of the National Security Commission, a policy formulation body of the Central Committee of the Chinese Communist Party (CCP) responsible for coordinating national security decision-making. It is the permanent body of the commission, and handles its day-to-day administrative operations.

== History ==
In September 2000, the CCP Central Committee decided to establish a Central National Security Leading Group co-located with the Central Foreign Affairs Leading Group, with one organization and two names. Jiang Zemin, General Secretary of the CCP Central Committee, was appointed as the group leader, Qian Qichen, Vice Premier of the State Council, was appointed as the deputy group leader, and Liu Huaqiu, former Director of the State Council Foreign Affairs Office, was appointed as the Director of the Office of the Central Foreign Affairs Leading Group and the Office of the Central National Security Leading Group.

After the establishment of the Central National Security Commission and its Office in 2014, the Central Foreign Affairs Leading Group no longer retained the name of the Central National Security Leading Group. The Office of the Central Foreign Affairs Leading Group also no longer retained the name of the Central National Security Leading Group Office and was renamed the Office of the Central National Security Commission.

== Organizational structure ==
The Office of the National Security Commission has the following organizations:

=== Internal Organization ===
- General Bureau
- Party Committee of the Office

== Leaders ==
Director

- Li Zhanshu (2014–2017, Secretary of the Secretariat of the CCP Central Committee and Director of the General Office of the CCP Central Committee)
- Ding Xuexiang (2017–2023, Secretary of the Secretariat of the CCP Central Committee and Director of the General Office of the CCP Central Committee)
- Cai Qi (2023-, member of the Standing Committee of the Political Bureau of the CCP Central Committee, Secretary of the Central Secretariat, and Director of the General Office of the CCP Central Committee)

Deputy Directors

- Cai Qi (March 2014 – April 2015, deputy director; April 2015 - October 2016, deputy director in charge of executive work (ministerial level))
- Liu Haixing (March 2017 – July 2022, Executive Deputy Director)
- Chen Wenqing (May 2018– July 2022, Executive Deputy Director, Minister of State Security)
