= Wang Yajun (diplomat) =

Chinese diplomat (born 1969)

- 王亚军

Chinese Ambassador to North Korea
- Incumbent
- Assumed office December 2021
- Appointed by: Xi Jinping
- Preceded by: Li Jinjun

Personal details
- Born: December 1969 (age 56) Anhui, China
- Party: Chinese Communist Party (1991-present)
- Education: China Foreign Affairs University

Chinese name
- Simplified Chinese: 王亚军
- Traditional Chinese: 王亞軍
Transcriptions
Standard Mandarin
- Hanyu Pinyin: Wáng Yàjūn

Wang Yajun (Chinese: 王亚军; born December 1969) is a Chinese diplomat who is the current Chinese Ambassador to North Korea, in office since December 2021.

== Biography ==
Wang was born in Anhui in December 1969. He graduated from China Foreign Affairs University. He joined the Chinese Communist Party in July 1991. He joined the Foreign Service in June 1995 as secretary of the Youth League Committee. He successively served as Deputy Director-General of the Policy Research Department of the Ministry of Foreign Affairs, Minister-Counselor of the Mission to the European Union and Director-General of the Policy Research Bureau of the Central Foreign Affairs Office. In July 2015, he became director of the Department of Policy Planning of the Ministry of Foreign Affairs, but having held the position for only one year, then he took office as assistant minister of the International Liaison Department of the Chinese Communist Party.

In December 2021, he was appointed Chinese Ambassador to North Korea according the National People's Congress decision, succeeding Li Jinjun. Due to travel restrictions amidst the COVID-19 pandemic, with a complete border lockdown in North Korea, Wang did not visit North Korea until late March 2023, fifteen months after taking office, as the first foreign diplomat to enter the country since January 2020. In May 2023, he was photographed fishing together with North Korean Foreign Minister Choe Son-hui after a meeting.

Diplomatic posts
Preceded by Li Jinjun	Chinese Ambassador to North Korea; 2021–present	Incumbent
