= Zhu Liang (politician) =

Chinese politician (1924–2025)

- 朱良

Director of the Foreign Affairs Committee of the National People's Congress
- In office March 1993 – March 1998
- Chairperson: Qiao Shi
- Preceded by: Liao Hansheng
- Succeeded by: Zeng Jianhui

Head of the International Department of the Chinese Communist Party
- In office December 1985 – March 1993
- Preceded by: Qian Liren
- Succeeded by: Li Shuzheng

Personal details
- Born: Zhou Zhiyi (周志毅); March 1924 Chaoyang, Shantou, Guangdong, China
- Died: 9 August 2025 (aged 101) Beijing, China
- Party: Chinese Communist Party
- Education: St. John's University, Shanghai

Zhu Liang (Chinese: 朱良; pinyin: Zhū Liáng; March 1924 – 9 August 2025) was a Chinese politician who served as head of the International Department of the Chinese Communist Party from 1985 to 1993.

Zhu was a member of the 4th, 5th, and 6th National Committee of the Chinese People's Political Consultative Conference. He was a member of the Standing Committee of the 8th National People's Congress and a member of the 13th Central Committee of the Chinese Communist Party.

== Early life and education ==
Zhu was born Zhou Zhiyi (周志毅) in Chaoyang County (now Chaoyang District, Shantou), Guangdong, in March 1924. He became a member of the Shanghai Student Salvation Association in 1939. In 1945, he enrolled at St. John's University, Shanghai, where he majored in the Department of Chemistry. He joined the Chinese Communist Party (CCP) in June 1945. During his school years, he was one of the leaders of the Chinese Communist Party in the university.

== Career ==
After the establishment of the People's Republic of China in 1949, Zhu was appointed deputy director of the Service Department of the Shanghai Municipal Working Committee of the China New Democratic Youth League (now Communist Youth League of China), secretary-general of the Shanghai Municipal Youth Federation, and deputy director of the Shanghai Municipal Sports Preparatory Committee. In 1951, he was the representative of the Central Committee of the Chinese New Democratic Youth League to the headquarters of the World Democratic Youth League in Hungary, and a journalist for the Chinese Press Corps at the Geneva Conference.

In 1954, Zhu was made head of the Central International Liaison Department of the Chinese New Democratic Youth League. In 1962, he was elevated to deputy head of the International Liaison Department of the Central Committee of the Communist Youth League of China and secretary-general of the All-China Youth Federation.

In 1966, the Cultural Revolution broke out. Zhu was sent to the May Seventh Cadre Schools to do farm work.

Zhu was reinstated in 1972. He was named director of the 8th Bureau of the International Department of the Chinese Communist Party in 1972. He moved up the ranks to become deputy head in 1981 and head in 1985. In 1986, he accompanied then General Secretary of the Chinese Communist Party Hu Yaobang on visits to West Germany, France, Italy and the United Kingdom. He served this role until 1993. From 1993 until his retirement in 1998, he was the director of the Foreign Affairs Committee of the National People's Congress.

== Death ==
Zhu died on 9 August 2025, at the age of 101.

Civic offices
| Preceded by Wang Chuanbin | Secretary-General of the All-China Youth Federation; 1965–1979 | Succeeded by Yin Minglian (殷明连) |
Party political offices
| Preceded by Qian Liren | Head of the International Department of the Chinese Communist Party; 1985–1993 | Succeeded by Li Shuzheng |
Assembly seats
| Preceded by Liao Hansheng | Director of the Foreign Affairs Committee of the National People's Congress; 1993–1998 | Succeeded by Zeng Jianhui |
