= Liu Hongcai =

Chinese diplomat

- 刘洪才
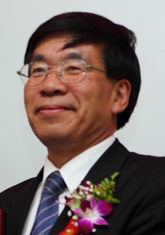

Chinese Ambassador to North Korea
- In office 2010–2015
- Preceded by: Liu Xiaoming
- Succeeded by: Li Jinjun

Vice Minister, International Liaison Department of the Chinese Communist Party
- In office 2003–2010

Personal details
- Born: June 1955 (age 71) Panjin, Liaoning
- Party: Chinese Communist Party
- Education: Beijing International Studies University

Liu Hongcai (born June 1955) is a Chinese diplomat, currently the deputy head of the International Liaison Department of the Chinese Communist Party; he is the former Chinese Ambassador to North Korea.

Liu was born in 1955 in Liaoning. He studied Japanese at Beijing Second Foreign Language Institute from 1972 to 1975. In his final year, Liu joined the Chinese Communist Party and was assigned to the International Liaison Department of the Central Committee upon graduation. Between the years of 1989 to 1992, he served as First Secretary at the Chinese Embassy in Tokyo. In 2003, he was appointed Vice Minister of the International Liaison Department. In 2010, he succeeded Liu Xiaoming as the Chinese Ambassador to North Korea.
