= Li Jinjun =

Chinese diplomat

- 李进军
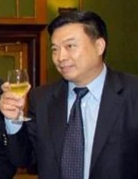
- Li as ambassador to the Philippines, 2006

Chinese Ambassador to North Korea
- In office March 2015 – December 2021
- Preceded by: Liu Hongcai
- Succeeded by: Wang Yajun

Deputy Head of the International Liaison Department of the Chinese Communist Party
- In office March 2007 – March 2015

Chinese Ambassador to the Philippines
- In office December 2005 – March 2007
- Preceded by: Wu Hongbo
- Succeeded by: Song Tao

Chinese Ambassador to Myanmar
- In office January 2001 – December 2005
- Preceded by: Liang Dong
- Succeeded by: Guan Mu

Personal details
- Born: May 1956 (age 70) Jiangyin, Jiangsu, China
- Party: Chinese Communist Party
- Education: Shanghai International Studies University; University of Heidelberg

Li Jinjun (simplified Chinese: 李进军; traditional Chinese: 李進軍; pinyin: Lǐ Jìnjūn; born May 1956) is a Chinese diplomat who has served as Chinese Ambassador to Myanmar, the Philippines, and North Korea.

== Life and career ==
Li was born and raised in Jiangyin, Jiangsu. He entered Shanghai International Studies University in September 1972, majoring in German language, where he graduated in March 1974. Then he was accepted to the University of Heidelberg and graduated in April 1976. After graduation, he returned to China and that year he was assigned to the International Liaison Department of the Chinese Communist Party.

He was Deputy Communist Party Secretary of Huantai County from September 1993 to October 1994.

In January 2001 he was promoted to become the Chinese Ambassador to Burma, a position he held until December 2005, when he was transferred to the Philippines and appointed the Chinese Ambassador.

He became the Deputy Head of the International Liaison Department of the CCP in March 2007, he remained in that position until March 2015, when he was appointed the Chinese Ambassador to North Korea. He was the longest-serving Chinese ambassador to North Korea; his tour in Pyongyang ended in 2021, with his departure from North Korea delayed by the COVID-19 pandemic. He was replaced by Wang Yajun.

Diplomatic posts
Preceded by Liang Dong (梁栋)	Chinese Ambassador to Myanmar; 2001–2005	Succeeded by Guan Mu (管木)
Preceded by Wu Hongbo (吴红波)	Chinese Ambassador to the Philippines; 2005–2007	Succeeded by Song Tao
Preceded by Liu Hongcai (刘洪才)	Chinese Ambassador to North Korea; 2015–2021	Succeeded by Wang Yajun (王亚军)
