= Liu Jianchao =

Chinese diplomat and politician (born 1964)

- 刘建超
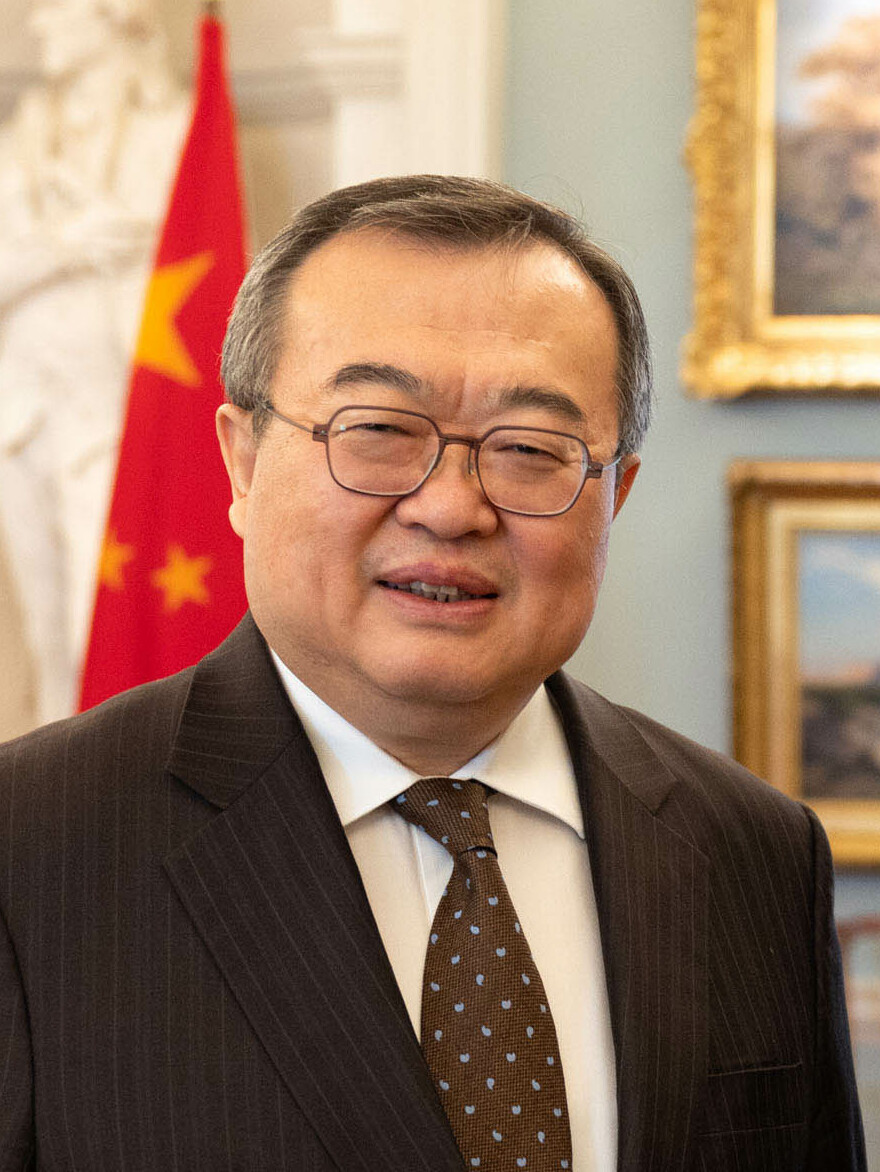
- Liu in 2023

Head of the International Department of the Chinese Communist Party
- In office 2 June 2022 – 30 September 2025
- General Secretary: Xi Jinping
- Preceded by: Song Tao
- Succeeded by: Liu Haixing

Director of Zhejiang Provincial Supervision Commission
- In office July 2017 – May 2018
- Preceded by: Ren Zemin
- Succeeded by: Ren Zhenhe

Secretary of Zhejiang Provincial Commission for Discipline Inspection
- In office April 2017 – May 2018
- Preceded by: Ren Zemin
- Succeeded by: Ren Zhenhe

Director of the Information Department of the Ministry of Foreign Affairs
- In office January 2015 – April 2015
- Preceded by: Qin Gang
- Succeeded by: Lu Kang
- In office March 2006 – January 2009
- Preceded by: Kong Quan
- Succeeded by: Ma Zhaoxu

Chinese Ambassador to Indonesia
- In office January 2012 – February 2014
- Preceded by: Zhang Qiyue
- Succeeded by: Xie Feng

Chinese Ambassador to the Philippines
- In office March 2009 – January 2012
- Preceded by: Song Tao
- Succeeded by: Ma Keqing

Personal details
- Born: February 23, 1964 (age 62) Dehui, Jilin, China
- Party: Chinese Communist Party (1984-2026, expelled)
- Education: Beijing Foreign Studies University; University of Oxford

Chinese name
- Simplified Chinese: 刘建超
- Traditional Chinese: 劉建超
Transcriptions
Standard Mandarin
- Hanyu Pinyin: Liú Jiànchāo
- IPA: [ljǒʊ tɕjɛ̂nʈʂʰáʊ]

Liu Jianchao (Chinese: 刘建超; born February 23, 1964) is a Chinese diplomat and politician who served as the head of the International Department of the Chinese Communist Party from 2022 to 2025.

Liu was formerly the deputy director of the Chinese Communist Party's Office of the Central Foreign Affairs Commission, as well as the chief spokesperson for China's Ministry of Foreign Affairs and the former director-general of its Information Department. Liu has served as Chinese ambassador to the Philippines and Indonesia. In October 2026, Liu was expelled from the Chinese Communist Party.

== Early life and career ==
Liu was born in Dehui, Jilin. He studied International Relations at Oxford University from 1986 to 1987 and then began work with the Ministry of Foreign Affairs in its Translation Office. He went on to hold various positions in departments and embassies, including the first secretary of the Chinese embassy in the United Kingdom from 1995 to 1998, counselor at the Information Department from 1998 to 2000, and deputy director-general of the Information Department from 2001 to 2006. He was also seconded to Liaoning Province as the deputy party secretary of Xingcheng from 2000 to 2001.

== Political career ==
=== Foreign Ministry ===
In March 2006, it was announced that he would be replacing Kong Quan as the director-general of the Information Department of the Ministry of Foreign Affairs as well as the chief spokesperson of the Ministry of Foreign Affairs.

During his tenure as chief spokesman for the ministry, Liu took questions on a wide variety of issues to do with China's relations with the world. For instance in 2007, when asked to comment on China's anti-satellite missile test he stated, "There's no need to feel threatened about this" and argued that "China will not participate in any kind of arms race in outer space." When interviewed about the 2008 Summer Olympics and access to the Internet from inside China, he once recognized that "some websites are difficult to access from China". In December 2008, he said that the government had a right to censor Web sites that violated the country's laws.

China's official Xinhua News Agency commented that "Liu was known for his sedate and humorous style in briefing reporters on China's foreign affairs." An example of this was his response on the shoe-throwing incident against US President Bush, where he said that the incident had given him "pause for thought" and that he would henceforth watch out for journalists taking off their shoes.

In January 2009, Liu was replaced as the director-general of the Information Department as well as the head spokesperson of the ministry by Ma Zhaoxu. At his farewell reception attended by ministry officials and journalists, Liu expressed his pleasure and gratitude at being able to participate in the Information Department's work in a period of complex and rapid changes for both China and the world. "The world is concerned about China; China also needs to understand the world. Strengthening mutual understanding and communication between China and the world is a beneficial thing."

Liu was subsequently appointed the ambassador to the Philippines. He presented his letter of credence in March 2009. Liu was later appointed Chinese ambassador to Indonesia. He presented his letter of credence to President Susilo Bambang Yudhoyono on 9 March 2012. In 2013, he was appointed to become an assistant minister of foreign affairs. In January 2015, he briefly returned as head of the Information Department, serving there until April 2015.

=== Commission for Discipline Inspection ===
In September 2015, he was promoted to become the head of the International Cooperation Agency of the Central Commission for Discipline Inspection of the Chinese Communist Party, making him the top official in charge of anti-corruption effort outside mainland China. During this time, he was a key figure in Operation Fox Hunt, a Chinese government mission whose purported aim is anti-corruption efforts outside of China.

In April 2017, Liu was named a member of the Zhejiang Provincial Committee of the Chinese Communist Party and the head of the provincial discipline inspection commission. Liu was a member of the 19th Central Commission for Discipline Inspection.

=== Central Foreign Affairs Commission Office ===
In April 2018, Liu was returned to the Office of the Central Foreign Affairs Commission of the Chinese Communist Party, and named deputy director in September.

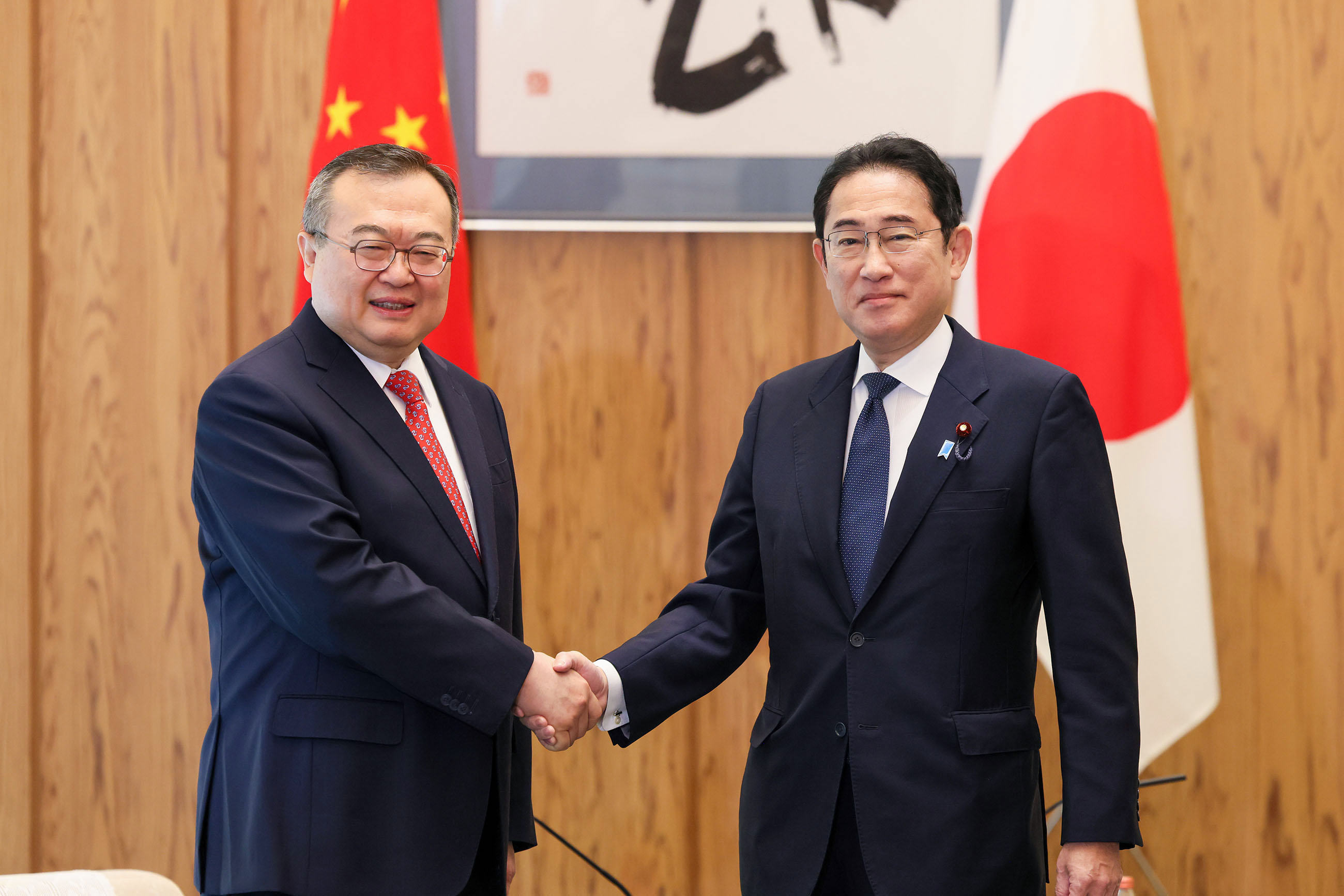
Liu with Japanese Prime Minister Fumio Kishida, May 29, 2024

=== Head of the International Department ===
In June 2022, Liu was appointed head of the International Department of the Chinese Communist Party, succeeding Song Tao. Compared to his predecessor, Liu took a more active diplomatic role, including by visiting more countries outside Asia. When discussing the United States' relationship with China in a meeting with Singaporean prime minister Lee Hsien Loong in March 2024, Liu stated that the U.S. "has not abandoned its policy to oppress and contain China."

== Downfall ==
In late July 2025, Liu Jianchao was detained by anti-corruption officials and taken away for questioning after returning from a trip overseas, according to The Wall Street Journal. No explanation was given, and his house was searched; he has not been seen publicly since. On 30 September 2025, Liu Haixing was announced as the new head of the International Department. On 29 October 2026, the fifth plenary session of the 20th CCP Central Committee reviewed and approved the report of the CCDI on the "serious violations of discipline and law" by Liu and confirmed the Politburo decision to expel him from the CCP.

Government offices
Preceded by Kong Quan	Director of the Information Department of the Ministry of Foreign Affairs; 2006–2009	Succeeded by Ma Zhaoxu
Preceded by Qin Gang	Director of the Information Department of the Ministry of Foreign Affairs; 2015	Succeeded by Lu Kang
Preceded by Ren Zemin	Director of Zhejiang Provincial Supervision Commission; 2017–2018	Succeeded by Ren Zhenhe
Diplomatic posts
Preceded by Song Tao	Chinese Ambassador to the Philippines; 2009–2012	Succeeded by Ma Keqing
Preceded by Zhang Qiyue	Chinese Ambassador to Indonesia; 2012–2014	Succeeded by Xie Feng
Party political offices
Preceded by Ren Zemin	Secretary of CCP Zhejiang Provincial Commission for Discipline Inspection; 2017–2018	Succeeded by Ren Zhenhe
Preceded by Song Tao	Head of the International Department of the Chinese Communist Party; 2022–2025	Succeeded by Liu Haixing
