= Wang Jiarui =

Chinese politician

- 王家瑞
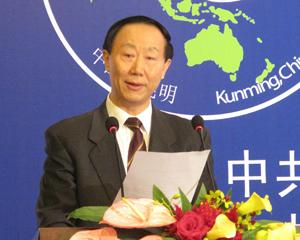

Head of the International Department of the Chinese Communist Party
- In office March 2003 – November 2015
- General Secretary: Hu Jintao; Xi Jinping
- Preceded by: Dai Bingguo
- Succeeded by: Song Tao

Personal details
- Born: September 1949 (age 77) Qinhuangdao, Hebei, China
- Party: Chinese Communist Party
- Education: Shanghai Maritime University

Wang Jiarui (Chinese: 王家瑞; born September 1949) is a Chinese politician and senior diplomat who served as the Vice Chairman of the Chinese People's Political Consultative Conference from 2013 to 2018. He served as head of the International Department of the Chinese Communist Party from 2003 to 2015.

== Biography ==
Born in Qinhuangdao, Hebei, Wang started working in June 1970, and joined the Chinese Communist Party in October 1973. From June 1970 to April 1972, he was a postman and accountant at a Changchun post office in Jilin. From April 1972 to October 1973 he studied international post English at the ocean department of Shanghai Maritime University. He then returned to Changchun and served as a specialist of international mail. He was promoted in April 1974 to vice section chief of the post office. From September 1976 to April 1978, he worked in the Jilin provincial bureau of post and telecommunications management, in charge of post business. In April 1978, he became the vice section chief of newspaper issuing at the bureau. In November 1980, he became the vice section chief of posts in that bureau. He was appointed to be the vice head of the Changchun postal bureau in April 1982.

In October 1985, Wang entered the national Ministry of Post and Telecommunications and became vice director and later, director of the bureau of newspaper issuing. During that time, from September 1983 to July 1987, he simultaneously completed a degree at Jilin University, majoring in national economic management. In July 1992, he was elevated to the position of vice director of the business bureau of the Economics and Trade Office of the State Council. From June 1993 to December 1994, he served as the vice director of the general bureau of the Ministry of Foreign Trade and Economic Co-operation (MOFTEC). From September 1988 to December 1994, he pursued postgraduate degrees in the School of Economics Management of Jilin University and obtained a master's degree and a doctorate. From December 1994 to August 1995 he was the director of the market circulation bureau of MOFTEC.

In August 1995, Wang was transferred to Qingdao, Shandong Province. His posts there included standing committee member of the CPC Qingdao Municipal committee as well as vice mayor and vice Party chief of the city. In February 1998, he became the mayor of Qingdao as well as the vice Party chief. During that period, he completed post-doctoral research in industrial economics at the School of Management of Fudan University and also studied at the Central Party School of the Chinese Communist Party from March to May 2000. In September 2000, he was appointed the vice director of the International Department of the Chinese Communist Party, and began serving as director in March 2003. During his term as the head of the International Department, Wang was mainly in charge of liaising with other Communist states, such as North Korea, Vietnam, and Cuba.

In 2009, he traveled to Pyongyang to meet with leaders regarding diplomatic issues of the Korean peninsula.

He was an alternate member of the 16th Central Committee of the Chinese Communist Party, and a member of the 17th and 18th Central Committee.

Party political offices
Preceded by Dai Bingguo	Head of the International Department of the Chinese Communist Party; 2003–2015	Succeeded by Song Tao
