= Mao Ning (diplomat) =

Chinese diplomat (born 1972)

- 毛宁
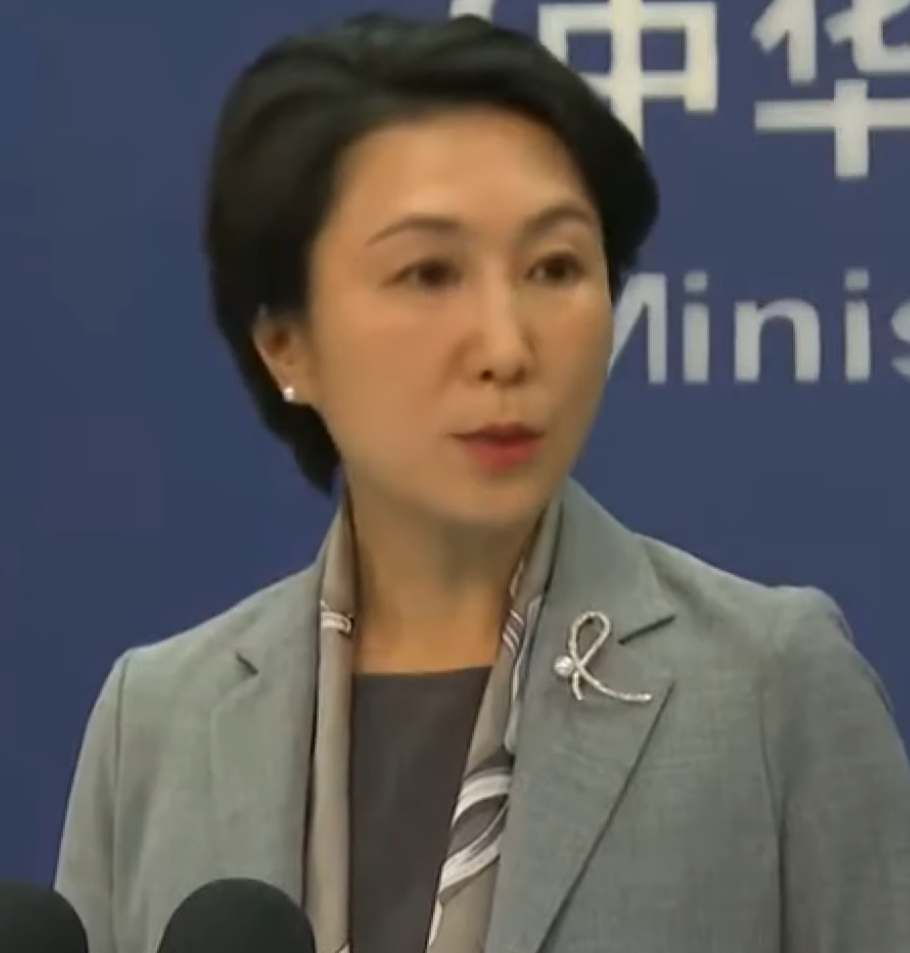
- Mao in January 2024

Director-General of the Department of Press Communication, and Public Diplomacy of the Ministry of Foreign Affairs
- Incumbent
- Assumed office 15 January 2025
- Preceded by: Hua Chunying

Deputy Director-General of the Department of Press, Communication and Public Diplomacy of the Ministry of Foreign Affairs
- In office 5 September 2022 – January 2025 Serving with Wang Wenbin, Hu Jian, Lin Jian, Jiang Xiaoyan
- Director-General: Hua Chunying

Personal details
- Born: December 1972 (age 53) Xiangtan, Hunan, China
- Party: Chinese Communist Party
- Spouse: Cong Jian (m. 1990s)
- Education: Hunan Normal University (BA); China Foreign Affairs University (LLB); George Washington University (MIPP)

Chinese name
- Simplified Chinese: 毛宁
- Traditional Chinese: 毛寧
Transcriptions
Standard Mandarin
- Hanyu Pinyin: Máo Níng

Mao Ning (Chinese: 毛宁; pinyin: Máo Níng; born December 1972) is a Chinese diplomat. She has served as the 33rd spokesperson for the Ministry of Foreign Affairs of the People's Republic of China since September 2022 and as the director-general of the MFA Department of Information (Note: 外交部新闻司, literally the MFA Department of News; also known as the Department of Press, Communication and Public Diplomacy) since January 2025.

Prior to being selected for the Ministry's chief spokesperson position, Mao has been engaged in diplomatic work for over 27 years, primarily working in the country's Asian affairs.

== Early life and education ==
Mao was born in Xiangtan, Hunan, in 1972, reportedly hailing from the same Chinese clan as Mao Zedong by the genealogy book.

In 1993, Mao graduated from Hunan Normal University in Changsha with a Bachelor of Arts, majoring in English. In 1995, she graduated from China Foreign Affairs University in Beijing with a Bachelor of Laws, majoring in diplomacy. In 2006, she graduated from George Washington University in the United States with a Master of International Policy and Practice.

== Career ==
Mao joined the Ministry of Foreign Affairs of the People's Republic of China in August 1995 and has served primarily in the Department of Asian Affairs. She was appointed as deputy secretary-general of the Trilateral Cooperation Secretariat in May 2011 and held that office until May 2013, when she was appointed as counselor at the Embassy of the People's Republic of China in the United States. She was recalled to the original department in November 2015, and was eventually promoted to deputy director-general in November 2017.

She was appointed as deputy mayor of Leshan, Sichuan in June 2020, and was later appointed as member of the Standing Committee of the Leshan Municipal Committee of the Chinese Communist Party, the city's top authority.

=== MFA spokesperson ===
On 5 September 2022, Mao was appointed as the 33rd spokesperson for the Ministry of Foreign Affairs of the People's Republic of China. Concurrently, she is a deputy of the Chaoyang District to the Beijing Municipal People's Congress.

On 15 January 2025, Mao was named director-general of the Department of Press, Communication, and Public Diplomacy of the Ministry of Foreign Affairs, succeeding Hua Chunying.

== Political views and statements ==
As a diplomat and spokeswoman for the foreign ministry, Mao noted that US lawmakers have a deeply flawed perception of China, terming it as "China-phobia". Mao was seen as a diplomat who followed Hua Chunying's "manly" assertiveness in diplomatic discourse.

=== COVID-19 restrictions ===
In January 2023, after some countries imposed restrictions targeting travelers arriving from China, including testing upon entry and quarantine for those who test positive for COVID-19, Mao noted that some entry restrictions targeted only those from China claiming that it "lacks scientific basis and some practices are unacceptable". She further added that China firmly rejects the use of COVID-19 prevention and control measures for "political purposes" and "will take corresponding measures in response to varying situations based on the principle of reciprocity." Responding to the European Union's proposal to give China free vaccines, she stated that China has the capacity to produce enough vaccines and expressed confidence in the state's ability in controlling the epidemic.

=== Taiwan ===
Mao had asserted that "Taiwan is an inalienable part of the People's Republic of China." In January 2024, after Philippine President Bongbong Marcos congratulated Taiwanese presidential candidate Lai Ching-te on his victory at the 2024 Taiwan presidential election, Mao said at a press briefing that Marcos' comments represent "a serious violation of the One China principle" and "a gross interference in China's internal affairs." She also stated that "President Marcos read more books to properly understand the ins and outs of the Taiwan issue, so as to draw the right conclusions." In response to Mao's comments, secretary of national defense of the Philippines Gilberto Teodoro said that Mao "stooped to such low and gutter level talk—resorting to insulting our President and the Filipino nation, and further debasing herself, the Ministry, and Party she represents in the process."

=== South China Sea dispute ===
President Marcos's proposal for a Code of Conduct in the South China Sea made some annoyance in Beijing. Mao expressed that any desertion from the Declaration of the Conduct of the Parties in the SCS framework and "its spirit" would be considered "null and void." In November 2024, after China summoned the Philippine ambassador to object the Philippines' Maritime Zones Law, Mao urged the country to respect China's territorial rights over the South China Sea. She also urged the United States to stop "meddling" in the South China Sea dispute and called on to the Philippines to remove its Typhon missile system acquired from the U.S.

=== Civil War in Myanmar ===
In January 2025, as the Myanmar military and the Myanmar National Democratic Alliance Army (MNDAA) signed a ceasefire agreement in Kunming, China, Mao stated that China's peace efforts in the north of Myanmar is in "the common interest of all parties in Myanmar and all countries in the region."

== Notes ==
Government offices
Preceded by Hua Chunying	Director-General of the Department of Press, Communication, and Public Diplomacy of the Ministry of Foreign Affairs; 2025–present	Incumbent
