= Ma Keqing =

Chinese diplomat

- 马克卿
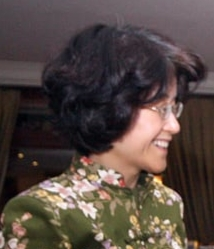
- Ma in 2013

Chinese Ambassador to the Philippines
- In office January 2012 – December 2013
- Appointed by: Hu Jintao
- Preceded by: Liu Jianchao
- Succeeded by: Zhao Jianhua

Chinese Ambassador to Finland
- In office 2006–2009
- Appointed by: Hu Jintao
- Preceded by: Zhang Zhijian
- Succeeded by: Huang Xing

Personal details
- Born: October 1955 (age 70–71) Longkou, Shandong
- Party: Chinese Communist Party
- Education: Tianjin Foreign Language School; University of Helsinki

Ma Keqing (Chinese: 马克卿; born October 1955) is a Chinese diplomat who served as Chinese ambassador to Finland from 2006 to 2009, the Philippines from 2012 to 2013, and the Czech Republic from 2014 to 2018.

== Early life and education ==
Ma was from Longkou, Shandong, born in October 1955. She studied at Tianjin Foreign Language School, where she studied English. In 1973, Ma Keqing was selected to study Finnish at the University of Helsinki in Finland.

== Career ==
=== European affairs and Finland ===
In 1976, she returned to China and joined the Ministry of Foreign Affairs of the People's Republic of China, becoming a diplomat. She successively served in the Department of Western European Affairs of the Ministry of Foreign Affairs and the Chinese embassy in Finland. In 1996, she served as a counselor at the Chinese embassy in Finland. In 2001, she served as deputy director of the Department of Western European Affairs of the Ministry of Foreign Affairs. In 2004, she served as deputy director of the Department of European Affairs of the Ministry of Foreign Affairs. In May 2006, she became the Chinese Ambassador to Finland.

=== Philippines ===
In 2009, she served as the deputy executive secretary of the Party Committee of the Ministry of Foreign Affairs. In January 2012, she became the Ambassador of China to the Philippines. During her ambassadorship to the country, she was known to defend China's sovereign rights over the South China Sea. In February 2013, Ma returned the note verbale notification for international arbitration on China's claims given by the Philippine Department of Foreign Affairs as China rejected such attempt by the Philippines. In that same year, she had been in discussions and negotiations with Philippine officials regarding incidents that occurred in disputed areas.

Upon her leaving as ambassador in December 2013, Philippine foreign secretary Albert del Rosario held a Christmas farewell lunch for Ma, calling her as "our dearest friend" while acknowledging the "challenges" of the Philippine-China relations over the South China Sea dispute. Ma told Del Rosario that she wished the relations could have been better between the two nations.

=== Later career ===
In February 2014, she was appointed Ambassador of China to the Czech Republic. In August 2018, she retired from her position as ambassador. In January 2020, she was appointed Executive Vice Chairman of the Chinese National Committee for Pacific Economic Cooperation.
