= Ni Zhiliang =

Chinese diplomat and lieutenant general of the People's Liberation Army

- 倪志亮
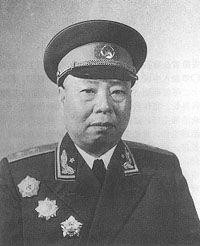

1st Chinese Ambassador to North Korea
- In office July 1950 – September 1952
- Preceded by: Office established
- Succeeded by: Pan Zili

Personal details
- Born: October 1900 Shuntian Prefecture
- Died: December 16, 1965 (aged 65) Beijing
- Party: Chinese Communist Party

Ni Zhiliang (Chinese: 倪志亮; pinyin: Ní Zhìliàng) (October 1900 – December 15, 1965) was a People's Republic of China diplomat and People's Liberation Army lieutenant general. He was the 1st People's Republic of China Ambassador to North Korea (1950–1954).

== Biography ==
He joined the Chinese Communist Party in October 1926 and participated in the Guangzhou Uprising. In May 1928, he went to the border region of Hubei, Henan and Anhui. During the Second Sino-Japanese War, he was a member of the Eighth Route Army, serving in Shanxi, Hebei and Henan. In October 1945 he went to Northeast China. From 1950 to 1954, he served as the Chinese ambassador to North Korea.

He died in Beijing on 16 December 1965.

Preceded by new office	People's Republic of China Ambassador to North Korea; 1950–1952	Succeeded by Pan Zili
