= Liu Haixing =

Chinese politician

- 刘海星
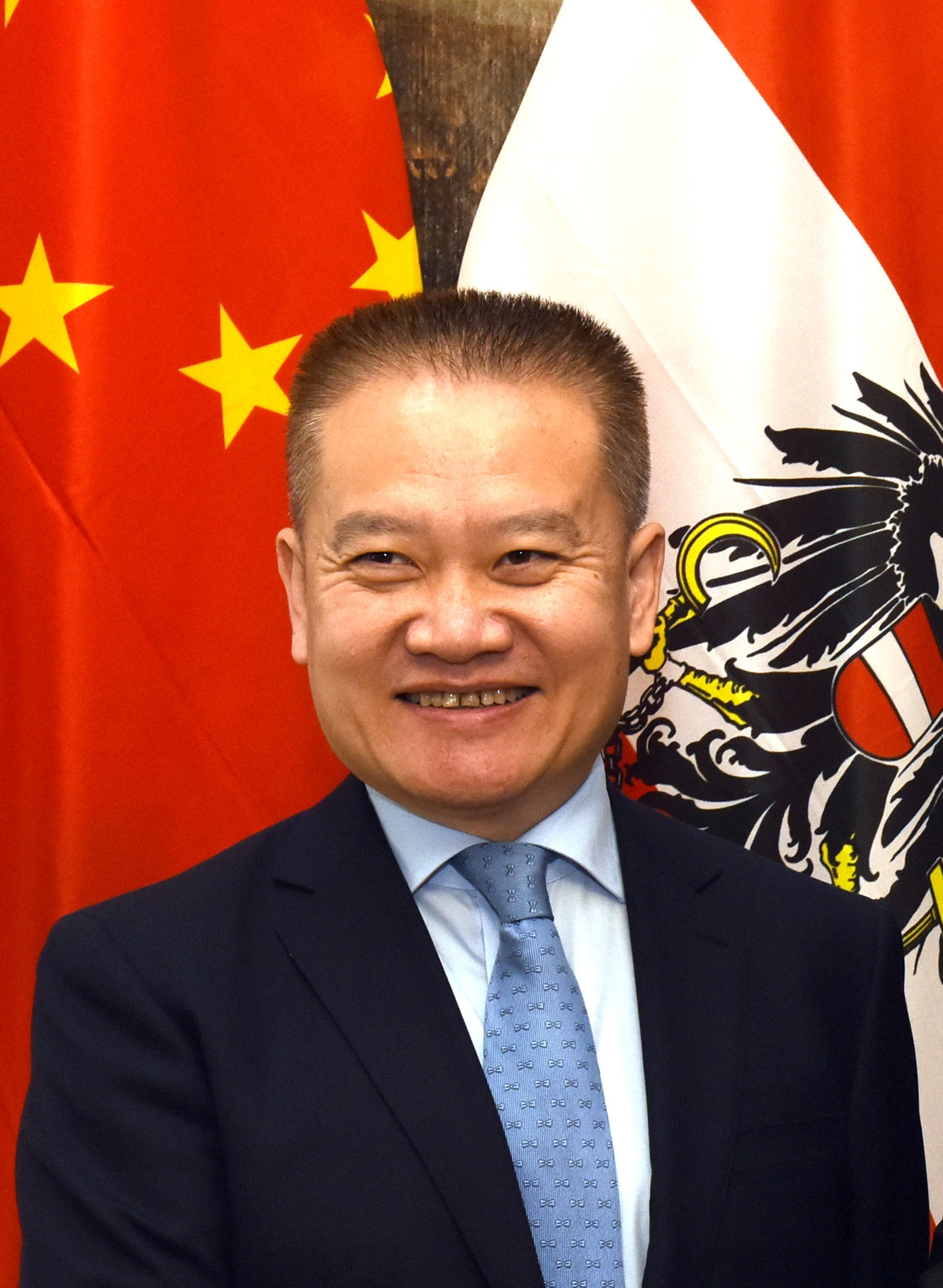
- Liu in 2016

Head of the International Department of the Chinese Communist Party
- Incumbent
- Assumed office 30 September 2025
- General Secretary: Xi Jinping
- Preceded by: Liu Jianchao

Executive Deputy Director of the Office of the National Security Commission
- In office July 2022 – September 2025
- Preceded by: Chen Wenqing

Personal details
- Born: April 1963 (age 63) Beijing, China
- Party: Chinese Communist Party
- Spouse: Zhang Meifang
- Children: 1
- Parent: Liu Shuqing
- Education: Beijing Foreign Studies University; International School of Public Administration; National School of Administration

Chinese name
- Simplified Chinese: 刘海星
- Traditional Chinese: 劉海星
Transcriptions
Standard Mandarin
- Hanyu Pinyin: Liú Hǎixīng

Liu Haixing (Chinese: 刘海星; born April 1963) is a Chinese diplomat and politician, currently serving as Head of the International Department of the Chinese Communist Party (ministerial-level).

He is a representative of the 20th National Congress of the Chinese Communist Party and a member of the 20th Central Committee of the Chinese Communist Party. He is a delegate to the 13th National People's Congress.

== Early life and education ==
Liu was born in Beijing, in April 1963, to Liu Shuqing, a diplomat and politician. His ancestral home is in Jiangyin, Jiangsu. After graduating from Beijing Foreign Studies University in 1985, he joined the Foreign Service. From 1987 to 1988, he studied at the International School of Public Administration in Paris, France.

== Political career ==
Liu returned to China in 1988 and continued to work at the Translation Office of the Ministry of Foreign Affairs. From 1994 to 1996, he studied at the National School of Administration. After working in the Translation Office of the Ministry of Foreign Affairs for two years, he was appointed first secretary of the Chinese Embassy in France in 1998. In 2002, he became counsellor of the Permanent Mission of the People's Republic of China to the United Nations. He was made deputy director of the Western Europe Department of the Ministry of Foreign Affairs in 2003, and served until 2009, when he was chosen as envoy of the Chinese Embassy in France.

In 2012, he succeeded Li Ruiyu as director of the European Department of the Ministry of Foreign Affairs, a post he kept until 2015. In 2015, he was promoted to become assistant foreign minister, a position he held until 2017. In March 2018, he took office as vice chairperson of the Supervisory and Judicial Affairs Committee of the National People's Congress. In July 2022, Liu was appointed as Executive Deputy Director of the Office of the National Security Commission.

=== Head of the International Department ===
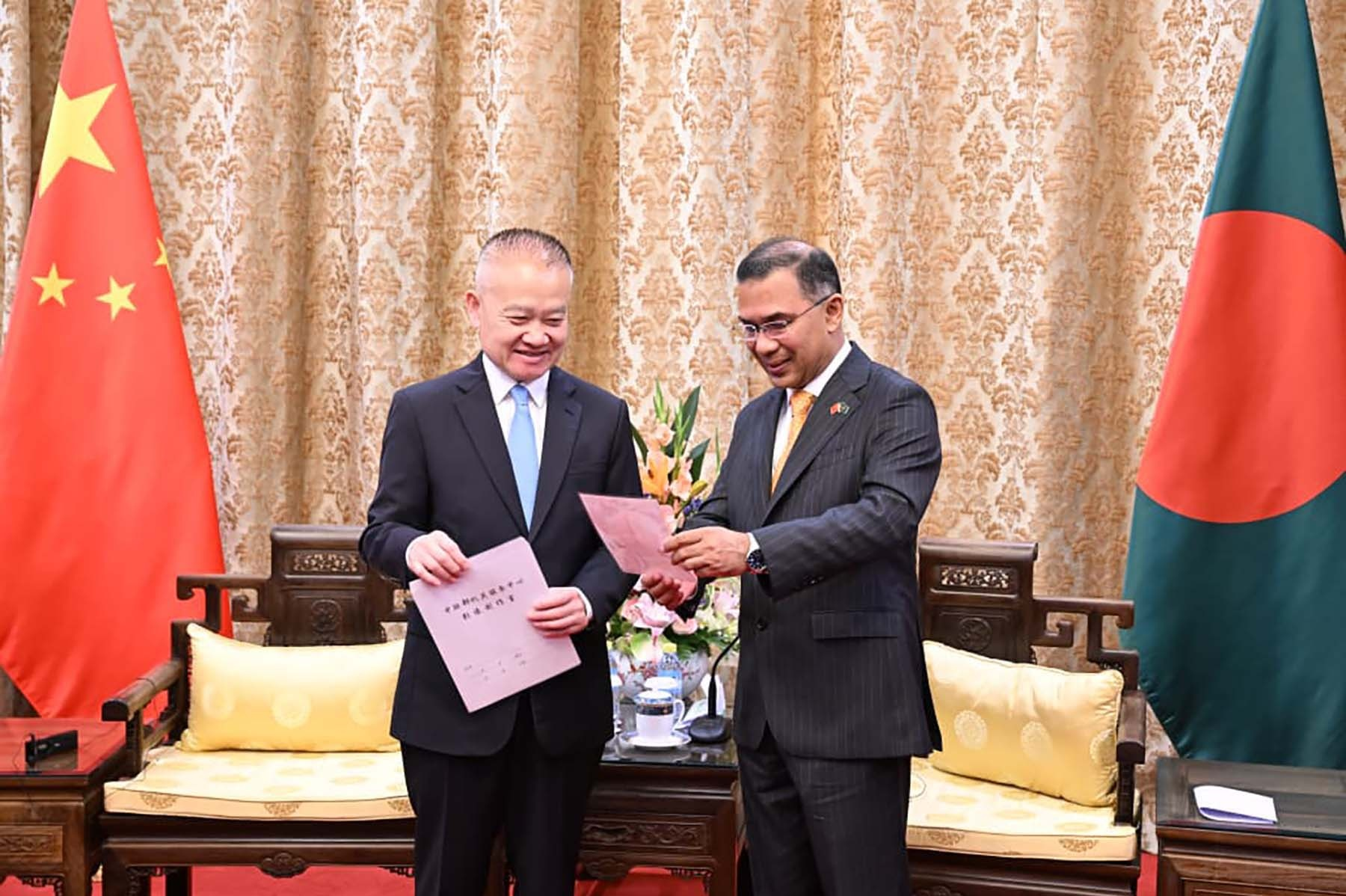
Liu Haixing meeting with Bangladeshi PM Tarique Rahman at theDiaoyutai State Guesthouse, Beijing, 2026-06-25.jpg

On 30 September 2025, he was announced as the new head of the International Department of the Chinese Communist Party, succeeding Liu Jianchao who, according to sources, was detained by anti-corruption officials. In November 2025, Liu met with Social Democratic Party of Germany co-leader Lars Klingbeil as part of the party dialogue between the SPD and the CCP established in 1984.

In January 2026, Liu wrote in the People’s Daily that "frequent systemic crises within capitalism" and the success of the Chinese model means that "historical evolution and the competition between the two ideologies and social systems — socialism and capitalism — are undergoing a major shift on a global scale that increasingly favors socialism". He also argued that China's rise had shattered the "Western-centric" logic that equates modernization with Westernization and "sets a benchmark and provides a brand-new alternative for developing nations seeking to achieve modernization while maintaining their independence and autonomy".

In August 2026, Liu met with Emilio Lozada Garcia, the Head of the Department of International Relations of the Communist Party of Cuba, where he said that China and Cuba are "good friends, good comrades and good brothers".

== Personal life ==
Liu married diplomat Zhang Meifang, who bore him a daughter.

Government offices
Preceded by Li Ruiyu	Director of the European Department of the Ministry of Foreign Affairs; 2012–2015	Succeeded by Chen Xu
Party political offices
Preceded by Chen Wenqing	Executive Deputy Director of the Office of the Central National Security Commission; 2022–2025	Vacant
Preceded by Liu Jianchao	Head of the International Department of the Chinese Communist Party; 2025–present	Incumbent
