= Song Tao (diplomat) =

Chinese politician and diplomat

- 宋涛
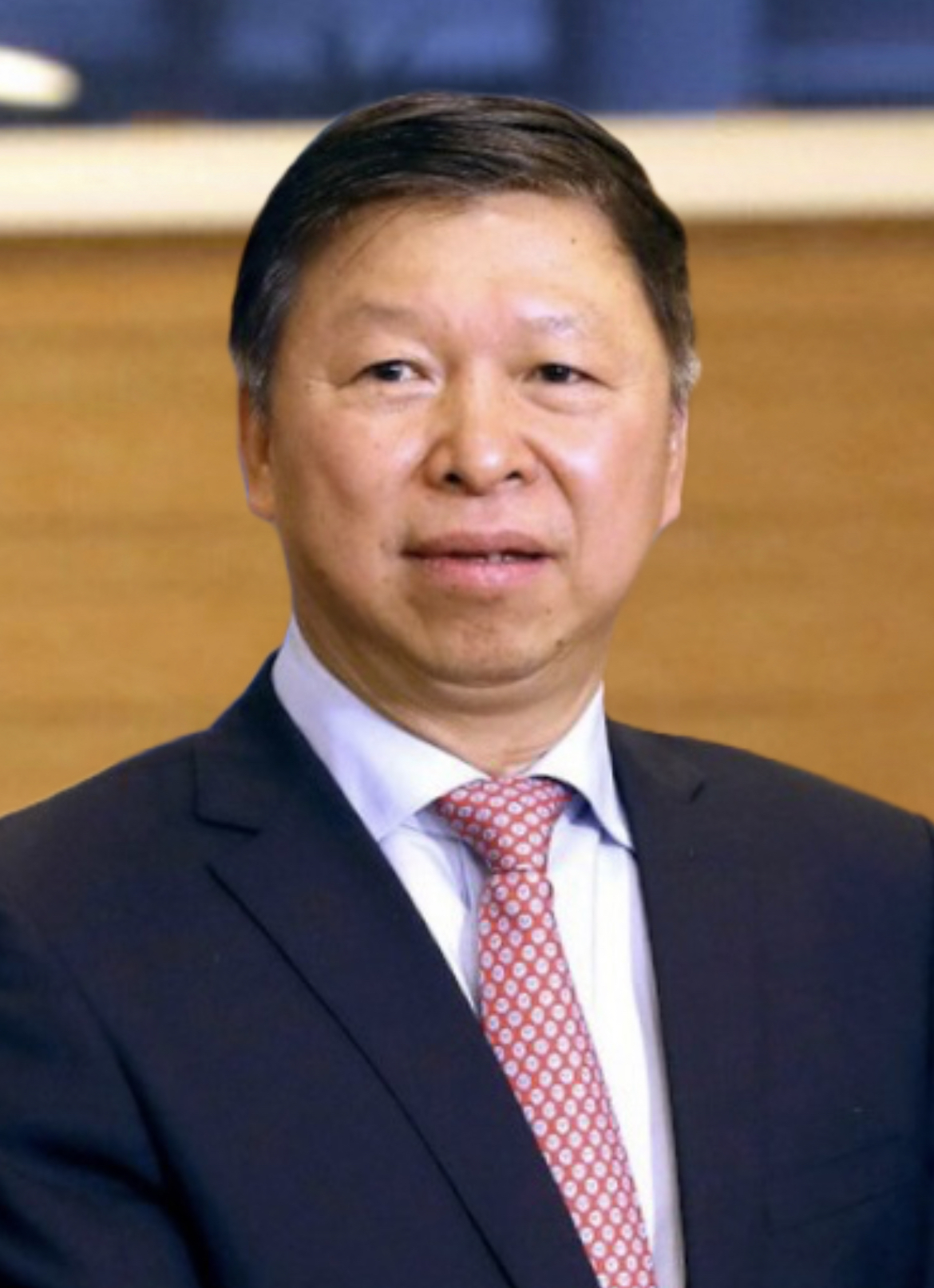
- Song in 2019

Director of the Taiwan Affairs Office
- Incumbent
- Assumed office 28 December 2022
- Premier: Li Keqiang; Li Qiang
- Preceded by: Liu Jieyi

Head of the International Department of the Chinese Communist Party
- In office 19 November 2015 – 2 June 2022
- General secretary: Xi Jinping
- Preceded by: Wang Jiarui
- Succeeded by: Liu Jianchao

Chinese Ambassador to the Philippines
- In office September 2007 – October 2008
- Preceded by: Li Jinjun
- Succeeded by: Liu Jianchao

Chinese Ambassador to Guyana
- In office March 2002 – August 2004
- Preceded by: Wu Zhenglong
- Succeeded by: Shen Qing

Personal details
- Born: April 1955 (age 71) Suqian, Jiangsu, China
- Party: Chinese Communist Party
- Education: Fujian Normal University

Chinese name
- Simplified Chinese: 宋涛
- Traditional Chinese: 宋濤
Transcriptions
Standard Mandarin
- Hanyu Pinyin: Sòng Tāo

Song Tao (Chinese: 宋涛; born April 1955) is a Chinese politician and diplomat, currently serving as director of the State Council Taiwan Affairs Office since December 2022. He served as head of the International Department of the Chinese Communist Party from 2015 to 2022. He was previously Chinese ambassador to Guyana, the Philippines, the disciplinary chief of the Ministry of Foreign Affairs, and executive deputy director of the Foreign Affairs Office.

== Biography ==
Song was born Suqian, Jiangsu province, in April 1955. During the Cultural Revolution, when Song was a teenager, he performed manual labour as a sent-down youth in Sha County, Fujian. He worked in the province for his whole life. He attended Fujian Normal University. Beginning in 1978, he worked at the Fujian Forestry Institute. He was later transferred to the Light Industry Institute of Fujian. He also worked in Luoyuan County, the Light Textiles Industry Company of Fujian, Fujian International Trust Company. From September 1988 to August 1991, he attended Monash University in Australia. In 2001, he was named as an assistant to the Chinese ambassador to India. He then became ambassador to Guyana, a department chief in the Ministry of Foreign Affairs, and the ambassador to the Philippines.

In August 2008, he joined the party committee of the Ministry of Foreign Affairs and the head of discipline inspection of the ministry, in charge of supervision and anti-corruption activities. In September 2011, he was named vice minister of foreign affairs. In November 2013, he was named deputy head of the Foreign Affairs Office, the execution arm of the Foreign Affairs Leading Group. In September 2014, he was elevated to executive deputy chief of the office, with the rank equivalent of a minister.

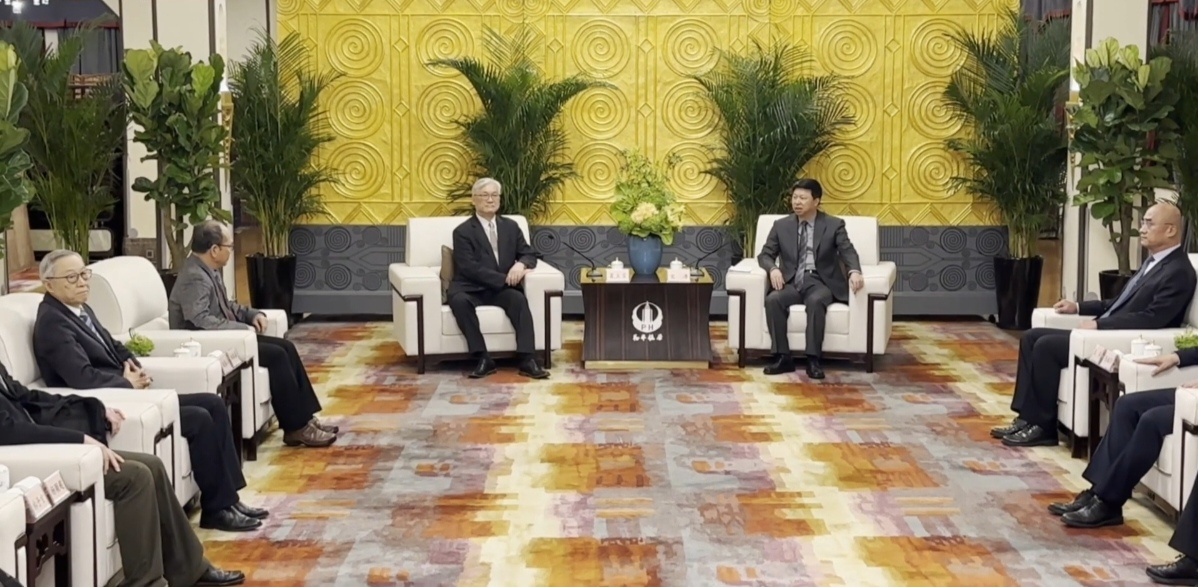
In 2024, Song Tao meets with visiting Kuomintang Vice Chairman Andrew Hsia in Shanghai

In October 2015, Song accompanied Politburo Standing Committee member Liu Yunshan on a high-profile trip to North Korea. In November 2015, he replaced Wang Jiarui as head of the International Department of the Chinese Communist Party. Wang had been at the helm of the department for over a decade.

On 28 December 2022, he was appointed director of the Taiwan Affairs Office, succeeding Liu Jieyi.

== Honours ==
=== Foreign decorations ===
- Grand Cross of the Royal Order of Cambodia
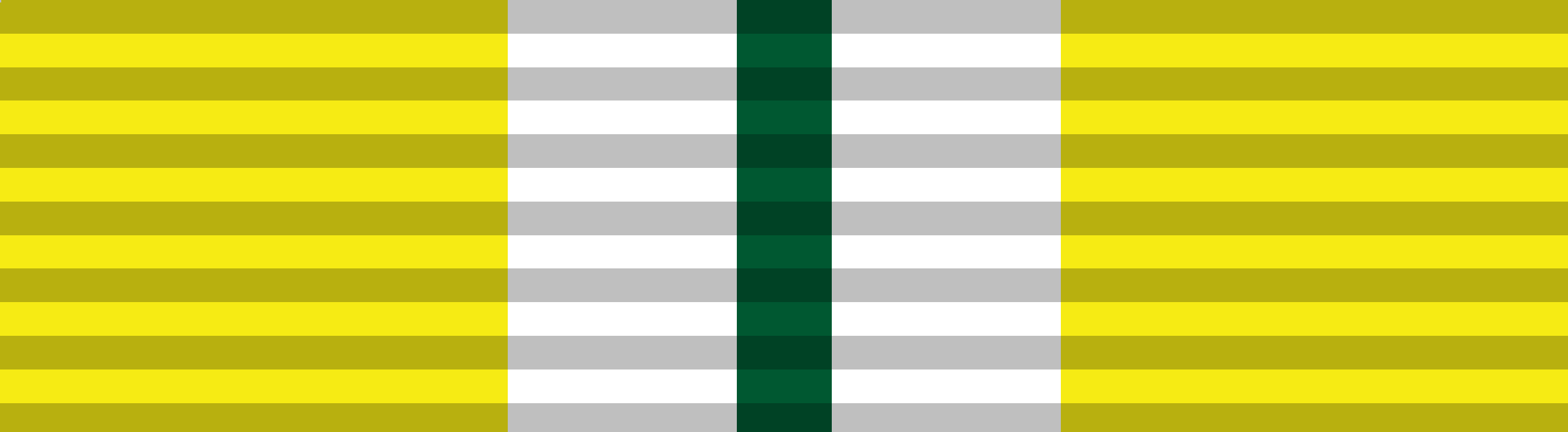
- Hilal-i-Imtiaz

Diplomatic posts
Preceded by Wu Zhenglong	Chinese Ambassador to Guyana; 2002–2004	Succeeded by Shen Qing
Preceded by Li Jinjun	Chinese Ambassador to the Philippines; 2007–2008	Succeeded by Liu Jianchao
Party political offices
Preceded by Wang Jiarui	Head of the International Department of the Chinese Communist Party; 2015–2022	Succeeded by Liu Jianchao
Preceded by Liu Jieyi	Director of the Taiwan Work Office of the CCP Central Committee; 2022–present	Incumbent
Government offices
Preceded by Liu Jieyi	Director of the Taiwan Affairs Office; 2022–present	Incumbent
