= List of ambassadors of China to North Korea =

Ambassador of China to North Korea
- 中国驻朝鲜大使
- National emblem of China
- Incumbent; Wang Yajun since December 2021
- Ministry of Foreign Affairs; Embassy of China, Pyongyang
- Appointer: The president pursuant to a National People's Congress Standing Committee decision
- Inaugural holder: Ni Zhiliang
- Formation: 10 July 1950; 76 years ago
- Website: Chinese Embassy – Pyongyang

The ambassador of China to North Korea is the official representative of the People's Republic of China to the Democratic People's Republic of Korea.

Chinese-Korean diplomatic relations were well established before the Joseon period of Korean history. In 1882, the governments of the Kingdom of Great Joseon and in Beijing established diplomatic relations.

The current official title of the incumbent diplomat is Ambassador of the People's Republic of China to the Democratic People's Republic of Korea.

== List of representatives ==
=== Ministers of Imperial China ===
- Hsu Sou Peng was appointed December 14, 1899.
- Hsu Tai Shen was appointed November 12, 1901.

=== Ambassadors of the People's Republic ===
Diplomatic relations since October 6, 1949.

#	Ambassador	Took office	Left office	Notes
1	Ni Zhiliang	July 1950	September 1952	
2	Pan Zili	January 1955	February 1956	
3	Qiao Xiaoguang	April 1956	July 1961	
4	Hao Deqing	August 1961	November 1965	
5	Jiao Ruoyu	December 1965	March 1970	
6	Li Yunchuan	March 1970	June 1976	
7	Lu Zhixian	September 1976	February 1982	
8	Zong Kewen	August 1982	August 1987	
9	Wen Yezhan	October 1987	May 1990	
10	Zheng Yi	June 1990	September 1993	
11	Qiao Zonghuai	September 1993	March 1997	
12	Wan Yongxiang	April 1997	March 2000	
13	Wang Guozhang	April 2000	December 2001	
14	Wu Donghe	December 2001	August 2006	
15	Liu Xiaoming	September 2006	February 2010	
16	Liu Hongcai	March 2010	February 2015	
17	Li Jinjun	March 2015	December 2021	
18	Wang Yajun	December 2021		

== See also ==
- China-Korea Treaty of 1882
- List of diplomatic missions in North Korea
