= Huang Xinbai =

Chinese educator

Huang Xinbai (October 1921 – February 29, 2008, Chinese: 黄辛白), also known as Huang Yuelai (Chinese: 黄曰騋), originally from Jiading, Jiangsu Province (now part of Shanghai), was an educator in the People's Republic of China. He married Qian Zhengying in 1951.

== Biography ==
=== Republic of China ===
In May 1939, Huang Xinbai became a member of the Chinese Communist Party (CCP) while studying at the affiliated middle school of Guanghua University. Upon graduation, he remained in Shanghai and joined the Department of Electrical Engineering at Utopia University, subsequently becoming a leader of the university-wide organization "After-school Visiting Group" (Chinese: 课余参观团). In October 1942, following the arrest of a peripheral member of the CCP at Utopia University, the CCP organization assessed that Huang Xinbai and Qian Zhengying were at risk of arrest. The two relocated to the liberated region of Huaibei, Anhui Province, the site of the Fourth Division of the New Fourth Army. To prevent impacting his friends and relatives in Shanghai, both Qian Zhengying and Huang adopted new names. Shortly thereafter, the Japanese army conducted a "sweep" of the liberated region of Huaibei, while the commanders of the Fourth Division of the New Fourth Army relocated their forces to the liberated area of Huainan, where the Second Division of the New Fourth Army was deployed. From January 1943 until the conclusion of the Anti-Japanese War in 1945, Huang held the position of director of teaching at the Fourth High School of the Suwan Border Region of Huaibei, which was the county high school of Sihwulingfeng County in the liberated area of Huaibei, encompassing the bordering regions of Sihwulingfeng County (Chinese: 泗五灵凤县) during that period.

During the Chinese Civil War, Huang Xinbai held multiple positions, including secretary of the political department of the Central China Field Army, secretary of the CCP Central China Regional Committee, head of the propaganda section of the regional committee, and deputy head of the liaison section of the CCP Jianghuai District Committee. Subsequent to February 1949, he held the position of director of the teaching staff at the North Anhui branch of the then-East China University (Chinese: 华东大学; pinyin: Huádōng Dàxué) – which in 1951 merged into Shandong University – serving as a member of the school committee, among other roles.

=== People's Republic of China ===
Following the proclamation of the People's Republic of China, Huang Xinbai held the position of director of the teaching staff at the Anhui Branch of the university, head of the student department of the Anhui North Work Committee of the Communist Youth League of China, as well as the head of the United Front Work Department of the East China Work Committee. He married Qian Zhengying in the autumn of 1951 in Shanghai. In October 1952, he was appointed vice provost of Shanghai Jiaotong University, and from November 1953 onward, he served as the deputy head of the Department of Industrial Education and the Department of Higher Education within the Ministry of Education of the People's Republic of China. Since November 1953, he has served as deputy director and director of the Department of Industrial Education and the Department of Higher Education within the Ministry of Higher Education of the Central People's Government and the Ministry of Education of the People's Republic of China. In July 1965, he ascended to the role of Vice Minister of the Ministry of Higher Education.

Following the onset of the Cultural Revolution in 1966, Huang Xinbai was ousted and incarcerated in a cowshed. In 1969, he was assigned to the May 7 Cadre School in Fengyang, Anhui Province. By December 1971, he regained a leadership position, serving as Deputy Director of the Revolutionary Committee and Deputy Secretary of the Party Committee at Peking University. Throughout his tenure, he diligently endeavored to execute Premier Zhou Enlai's directives aimed at enhancing the instruction and investigation of fundamental natural science theories. Following Deng Xiaoping's reinstatement as Vice Premier of the State Council, Huang Xinbai was appointed by the Ministry of Education to head a "delegation of university presidents" on a study tour to Europe and the United States. By the time he returned to China, Deng Xiaoping had already been criticized and brought down again by the Red Guards, and Huang was implicated, resulting in the unprecedented condemnation of Peking University. Peking University published numerous critiques of Deng, addressing the resurgence of right-leaning sentiments, leading to renewed criticism of Huang Xinbai.

Following the reform and opening up, Huang Xinbai was reinstated as the vice minister of the Ministry of Education in April 1979. In March 1979, under the direct supervision of Deng Xiaoping, the central government issued directives for the establishment of a degree system. Subsequently, the Ministry of Education and the Bureau of Science and Technology Cadres of the State Council formed a drafting group for the degree regulations, led by Jiang Nanxiang, with Huang Xinbai serving as the principal assistant, resulting in the proposal of the "Regulations of the People's Republic of China on Degrees (Draft)" (Chinese: 中华人民共和国学位条例). In February 1980, the Regulations of the People's Republic of China on Academic Degrees were enacted by the 13th meeting of the Standing Committee of the 5th National People's Congress and became effective in 1981. In May 1980, the State Council approved the establishment of the Office of Academic Degrees Committee inside the Ministry of Education to oversee the daily administration of academic degrees nationwide. Huang Xinbai served as the inaugural director of the Office of the Academic Degrees Committee of the State Council (Chinese: 国务院学位委员会). In December 1980, the State Council approved the formation of the first Academic Degrees Committee, comprising 41 members, including Huang Xinbai. In May 1981, he was appointed secretary-general of that committee. Additionally, in 1981, the Chinese Association for International Understanding was established, with Huang appointed as chairman for its first, second, and third sessions.

Huang serves as a member of the Seventh and Eighth National Committees of the Chinese People's Political Consultative Conference (CPPCC) and holds the position of Deputy Director of the Eighth National Committee of the CPPCC for Culture and Education.

Huang Xinbai die in Beijing on February 29, 2008, at the age of 87. On March 11, 2008, a goodbye ceremony took place in the auditorium of the Babaoshan Revolutionary Cemetery.
