= List of ambassadors of China to Finland =

The ambassador of China to Finland is the official representative of the People's Republic of China to Finland.

== List of representatives ==
Name (English)	Name (Chinese)	Tenure begins	Tenure ends	Note
Chen Xinren	陈辛仁	17 September 1954	November 1958	
Gan Yetao	甘野陶	19 January 1959	5 June 1962	
Zhang Bochuan	张勃川	28 June 1962	19 July 1965	
Yue Xin	岳欣	4 August 1965	January 1967	
Li Chuntian	李春田	January 1967	1968	
Liu Xuji	刘胥吉	1968	April 1970	
Shi Ziming	史梓铭	April 1970	July 1975	
Zhang Canming	张灿明	September 1975	18 November 1978	
Xie Bangzhi	谢邦治	March 1979	29 March 1980	
Sun Shengwei	孙盛渭	May 1981	January 1985	
Lin Aili	林霭丽	April 1985	March 1988	
Yu Lixuan	于立暄	May 1988	9 November 1991	
Qiao Zonghuai	乔宗淮	January 1992	September 1993	
Zheng Jinjiong	郑锦炯	December 1993	November 1995	
Wang Lian	王廉	December 1995	October 1998	
Lü Xinhua	吕新华	November 1998	February 2002	
Zhang Zhijian	张直鉴	March 2002	May 2006	
Ma Keqing	马克卿	May 2006	July 2009	
Huang Xing	黄兴	August 2009	January 2014	
Yu Qingtao	于庆泰	February 2014	October 2016	
Chen Li	陈立	October 2016		

== See also ==
- China–Finland relations
