= Chinese Association for International Understanding =

Foreign intelligence and influence organization of the People's Republic of China

- Abbreviation: CAFIU
- Formation: September 1981; 44 years ago
- Headquarters: 15 Wanshou Road, Haidian District, Beijing
- President: Ji Bingxuan
- Parent organization: International Liaison Department of the Chinese Communist Party
- Website: www.cafiu.org.cn

The Chinese Association for International Understanding (CAFIU) is a Beijing-based organization, registered under the Ministry of Civil Affairs, that is reported to be a front organization for the International Liaison Department of the Chinese Communist Party (CCP) used for international exchanges with academics, think tanks, and other civil society organizations. CAFIU is reported to have links to the Political Work Department of the Central Military Commission.

CAFIU's president is Ji Bingxuan and its vice president is Ai Ping, former vice minister of the CCP's International Liaison Department. Yan Junqi, a former vice chairwoman of the National People's Congress, is a past president of the organization. Zhou Tienong served as a director of the organization. The organization publishes a journal titled International Understanding.

== History ==
in 1981, CAFIU was established, with Huang Xinbai appointed as chairman of its first, second, and third sessions. CAFIU was granted special consultative status with the United Nations Economic and Social Council in May 2003.

== Activity ==
CAFIU has traditionally sponsored trips for foreign academics and others to visit China. In the 1990s, CAFIU assisted efforts by the CCP and the People's Liberation Army to gain access to members of the United States Congress. CAFIU hosts events in support of the Belt and Road Initiative and One-China principle.

=== Scrutiny by governments ===
On September 3, 2020, the Indian government listed the CAFIU as an "entity of concern" and ordered tighter scrutiny of visa requests by CAFIU members, stating that it operates influence operations that run counter to national interests.

== See also ==
- China Association for International Friendly Contact
- China Institutes of Contemporary International Relations
- Chinese information operations and information warfare
- Political warfare
