= List of ambassadors of China to the Philippines =

Ambassador of People's Republic of China to the Republic of the Philippines
- 中国驻菲律宾大使
- National emblem of China

- Incumbent; Jing Quan since December 2025
- Appointer: The president; pursuant to a National People's Congress Standing Committee decision
- Inaugural holder: Xiao Te
- Formation: October 1975; 51 years ago
- Website: Chinese Embassy, Manila

The ambassador of China to the Philippines is the official representative of the People's Republic of China to the Philippines.

== List of representatives ==
=== Consul General of Qing China (1898–1912) ===
In July 1898, Spain gave permission to the Qing government in Beijing of establishing a consulate in Manila. Beijing had informed the Spanish minister in China and the Spanish Governor-General of the Philippines that they had selected Chen Gang as the first Consul General to the Philippines. However, Chen's arrival was delayed due to the United States' blockade in the islands, making his father, Chen Qianshan, as the acting consul general. As the US gained the Philippines as its occupied territory, the US government in Washington expressed that they would not recognize Chen Gang as consul general. Chen resigned to his post in 1899 for personal matters and was succeeded by Li Rongyao.

Image	Name (English)	Name (Chinese)	Tenure begins	Tenure ends	Note
	Chen Qianshan (Acting)	陈谦善	1898	1899	
	Chen Gang (Note: Considered as the first Consul General to the Philippines appointed by the Qing dynasty, however unrecognized by the US government.)	陈纲	1898	1899	
	Li Rongyao	黎荣耀	1899	1901	
	Cheng Ye-chiong	陈日翔	1901	1903	
	Li Tinggui	黎廷桂	1903	1904	
	Liang Xun	梁询	1904	1904	
	Li Tinggui	黎廷桂	1904	1906	
	Su Ruizhao	苏锐钊	1906	1907	
	Yang Shijun	杨士钧	1908	1909	
	Zhang Wenwei	张文蔚	1909	1910	
	Sun Shiyi	孙士颐	1910	1912	

=== Ambassador of the People's Republic of China (1975–present) ===
On June 9, 1975, relations between the People's Republic of China and the Republic of the Philippines established diplomatic relations. That same year, Xiao Te began his role as charge d'affaires until the arrival of the first PRC ambassador for the Chinese embassy in the Philippines, Ke Hua.

Image	Name (English)	Name (Chinese)	Tenure begins	Tenure ends	Note
	Xiao Te	肖特	October 1975	December 1975	
	Ke Hua	柯华	December 1975	April 1978	
	Chen Xinren	陈辛仁	September 1978	February 1981	
	Mo Yanzhong	莫燕忠	July 1982	June 1984	
	Chen Songlu	陈嵩禄	September 1984	May 1988	
	Wang Yingfan	王英凡	July 1988	October 1990	
	Huang Guifang	黄桂芳	March 1991	April 1995	
	Guan Dengming	关登明	April 1995	February 1999	
	Fu Ying	傅莹	March 1999	April 2000	
	Wang Chungui	王春贵	August 2000	March 2004	
	Wu Hongbo	吴红波	March 2004	October 2005	
	Li Jinjun	李进军	November 2005	May 2007	
	Song Tao	宋涛	September 2007	October 2008	
	Liu Jianchao	刘建超	March 2009	December 2011	
	Ma Keqing	马克卿	January 2012	December 2013	
	Zhao Jianhua	赵鉴华	February 2014	November 2019	
	Huang Xilian	黄溪连	December 2019	September 2025	
	Jing Quan	井泉	December 2025		

== See also ==
- China–Philippines relations
