= Li Rongyao =

Cantonese diplomat

- 黎荣耀
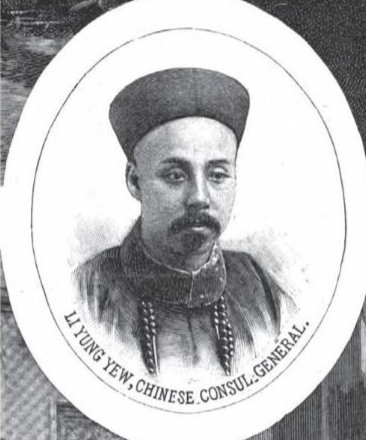
- Portrait, Harper's Weekly (1893)

Consul General of China to the Philippine Islands
- In office 1899–1901
- Preceded by: Chen Gang
- Succeeded by: Cheng Ye-chiong

Consul General of China to San Francisco
- In office 1891–1896
- In office 1910–1911

Chinese name
- Simplified Chinese: 黎荣耀
- Traditional Chinese: 黎榮耀
Transcriptions

Li Rongyao (Chinese: 黎荣耀), also spelled as Li Yung Yew, was a Cantonese diplomat who served as the Consul General of Qing China to the Philippines and Cuba, both occupied territories of the United States. In the US, he also served as Consul General to San Francisco twice from 1891 to 1896 and 1910 to 1911.

== Career ==
Li was consul general in San Francisco from 1891 to 1896. After the US State Department refused to recognize Chen Gang's appointment as consul general in the Philippines and Chen's subsequent resignation to the post, Li left his position in Cuba and became consul general there in 1899.

During his time in the Philippines, he was in rivalry with the former acting consul general Chen Qianshan. Chen, to assert control over the Chinese community, had made "derogatory" statements in broadsheets criticizing Li and doubting his credentials. Chen also claimed to represent a certain "Department for Protection of Merchants in the Philippines" sanctioned by Xiamen and the Qing government. Li, in turn, accuse Chen of extortion and false representation.

In 1901, Li left the Philippines and was appointed charge d'affaires in Madrid. He was succeeded by a Hokkien, Cheng Ye-chiong, as consul general. From 1910 to 1911, Li returned to the United States once again and assume the position of consul general in San Francisco.

== See also ==
- China–Philippines relations
