= Head of the International Department of the Chinese Communist Party =

Chinese Communist Party position

Head of the International Department of the Central Committee of the Chinese Communist Party
- 中国共产党中央委员会对外联络部部长
- Emblem of the Chinese Communist Party

- Flag of the Chinese Communist Party

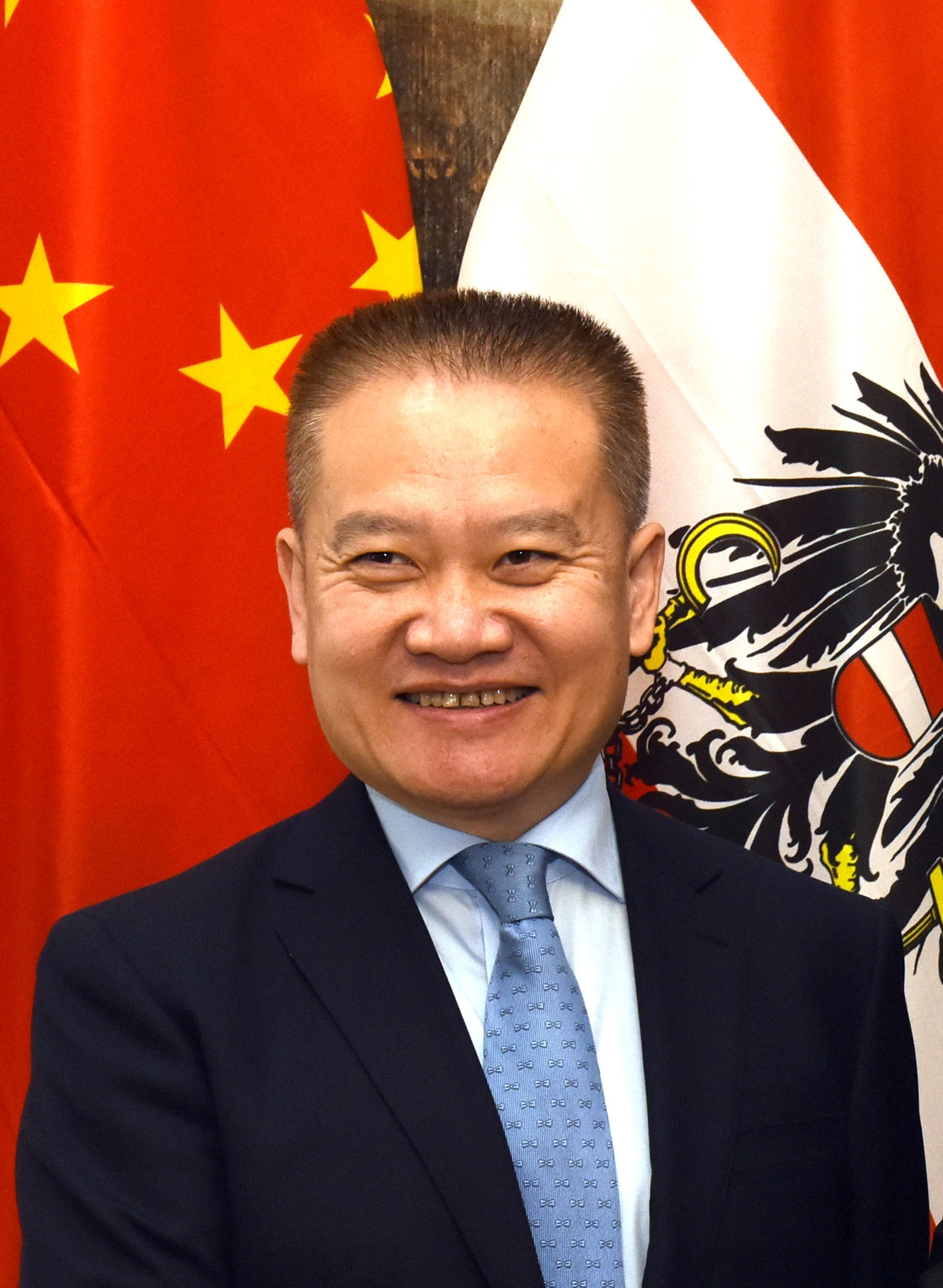
- Incumbent; Liu Haixing since September 30, 2025
- International Department of the Chinese Communist Party
- Type: Department Head
- Status: Provincial and ministerial-level official
- Seat: Beijing
- Nominator: Central Committee
- Appointer: Central Committee
- Inaugural holder: Wang Jiaxiang
- Formation: 1951
- Deputy: Deputy Head

The head of the International Department of the Central Committee of the Chinese Communist Party is the leader of the International Department, a department of the Central Committee of the Chinese Communist Party (CCP).

The current head of the International Department is Liu Haixing, who assumed office on 30 September 2025.

== List of heads ==
Department Head	Term of office		Ref.
Department Head	Took office	Left office	Ref.
Wang Jiaxiang	1951	March 1966	
Liu Ningyi (acting)	June 1966	April 1968	
Geng Biao	January 1971	January 1979	
Ji Pengfei	January 1979	April 1982	
Qiao Shi	April 1982	July 1983	
Qian Liren	July 1983	December 1985	
Zhu Liang	December 1985	March 1993	
Li Shuzheng	March 1993	August 1997	
Dai Bingguo	August 1997	March 2003	
Wang Jiarui	March 2003	November 2015	
Song Tao	19 November 2015	2 June 2022	
Liu Jianchao	2 June 2022	30 September 2025	
Liu Haixing	30 September 2025	Incumbent	
