= Li Shuzheng =

Chinese politician (1929–2024)

- 李淑铮

Head of the International Department of the Chinese Communist Party
- In office March 1993 – August 1997
- Preceded by: Zhu Liang
- Succeeded by: Dai Bingguo

Personal details
- Born: October 1929 Shanghai, China
- Died: 27 February 2024 (aged 94) Beijing, China
- Party: Chinese Communist Party
- Education: Affiliated High School of Shanghai Zhendan Women's College

Chinese name
- Simplified Chinese: 李淑铮
- Traditional Chinese: 李淑錚
Transcriptions
Standard Mandarin
- Hanyu Pinyin: Lǐ Shūzhēng

Li Shuzheng (Chinese: 李淑铮; October 1929 – 27 February 2024) was a Chinese politician who served as head of the International Department of the Chinese Communist Party between 1993 and 1997.

She was a representative of the 12th, 13th, 14th, and 15th National Congress of the Chinese Communist Party. She was an alternate member of the 12th, 13th, and 14th Central Committee of the Chinese Communist Party. She was a member of the Standing Committee of the 9th National People's Congress.

== Early life and education ==
Li was born in Shanghai, in 1929, while her ancestral home in Dangtu County, Anhui. She attended the Affiliated High School of Shanghai Zhendan Women's College. She joined the Chinese Communist Party (CCP) in July 1945.

== Career ==
Li was despatched to the Communist Youth League of China in 1952, becoming deputy director of the International Department in 1961 and director of Youth Department in 1964.

In 1966, the Cultural Revolution broke out, she was sent to the May Seventh Cadre Schools to do farm works. She was reinstated in December 1973. She entered the International Department of the Chinese Communist Party in 1978, where she moved up the ranks to become deputy head in 1981 and head in 1993. In 1997, she was chosen as vice president of the China Association for International Exchange. In August 1998, she was made president of the China-Korea Friendship Association. She retired in March 2004.

On 27 February 2024, she died of an illness in Beijing, at the age of 94.

Party political offices
Preceded by Zhu Liang	Head of the International Department of the Chinese Communist Party; 1993–1997	Succeeded by Dai Bingguo
