= Party Rectification =

1980s Chinese Communist Party campaign

Party Rectification (Chinese: 整党; pinyin: Zhěng dǎng) was a political campaign launched within the Chinese Communist Party (CCP) from 1983 to 1987, aimed at "unifying thinking, rectifying work style, strengthening discipline, and purifying the organization," lasting approximately three and a half years. Through this movement, the CCP leadership systematically addressed the legacy of the Cultural Revolution within Party organizations and among Party members, with a focus on purging "three types of people".

== Background ==
"Party rectification" has been carried out multiple times in the history of the Chinese Communist Party (CCP). In June 1981, the sixth plenary session of the 11th Central Committee of the CCP adopted the Resolution on Certain Questions in the History of Our Party since the Founding of the People's Republic of China, marking the completion of the "correction of errors" in the CCP's guiding ideology and ending the "erroneous" line of Mao Zedong's later years. However, the CCP leadership believed that after ten years of the Cultural Revolution, there was "serious impurity in ideology, style, and organization" within the Party. Ideologically, some members were considered ot have "failed" to understand the significance of correcting errors or violated Marxism; in terms of style, discipline was lax, power was abused for personal gain, and violations of laws and regulations were rampant. Furthermore, the "three types of people" within the Party (those who followed the Lin Biao and Jiang Qing to rise to power, those with strong factionalism, and those who engaged in violence and looting) had not been completely purged. In September 1982, Hu Yaobang, in his political report at the 12th National Congress of the CCP, proposed to "carry out party rectification in a planned and step-by-step manner to fundamentally improve the Party's style," and announced that "the Central Committee has decided to begin a comprehensive rectification of the Party's style and organization in stages over three years, starting in the second half of next year."

On 11 October 1983, the second plenary session of the 12th Central Committee of the Chinese Communist Party adopted the Decision of the CCP Central Committee on Party Rectification, announcing that Party Rectification would begin that winter. The task of rectification was summarized in 16 characters: "Unify thinking, rectify work style, strengthen discipline, and purify the organization." The main content of "purifying the organization" was to eliminate "three types of people." The rectification process proceeded from the central government to the grassroots organizations, in stages and batches. The basic method was to conduct criticism and self-criticism based on a thorough study of documents and improved ideological understanding, distinguishing right from wrong, correcting errors, and purifying the organization. The meeting decided to establish the Central Guidance Committee for Party Rectification (hereinafter referred to as the "Central Guidance Committee") as the guiding body for the party rectification work. Hu Yaobang, General Secretary of the CCP Central Committee, served concurrently as the committee's chairman, and Bo Yibo, Executive Vice Chairman of the CCP Central Advisory Commission, served concurrently as the executive vice chairman, presiding over daily work. Party organizations at all levels also established corresponding rectification work organizations. At the meeting, Deng Xiaoping emphasized that “the rectification of the Party cannot be a mere formality” and that “…the most dangerous are the ‘three types of people’…they are an ambitious political force that should not be underestimated. If they are not dealt with in the rectification of the Party, they will leave behind a seed of disaster and become a time bomb.”

== Central Party Rectification Work Guidance Committee ==
The list of members of the Central Guidance Committee for Party Rectification elected by the Second Plenary Session of the 12th CCP Central Committee on 11 October 1983 is as follows:

- Director: Hu Yaobang
- Deputy Directors: Wan Li, Yu Qiuli, Bo Yibo (Executive Deputy Director), Hu Qili, Wang Heshou
- Committee members: Deng Liqun, Chen Yepin, Wang Congwu, Han Guang, Kang Keqing, Wu Xiuquan, Hong Xuezhi, Gan Weihan, Zheng Tianxiang, Jiang Nanxiang, Gu Dachun, Huang Zhen, Yong Wentao, Wang Zhaoguo, Guo Jian, Zhang Xiushan
- Advisors: Wang Zhen, Yang Shangkun, Hu Qiaomu, Xi Zhongxun, Song Renqiong

The Central Party Rectification Work Guidance Committee has an office (Central Party Rectification Office) as its working body, with Yong Wentao and Li Li'an serving as its directors successively.

== The campaign ==
The Party rectification was carried out in three phases. The first phase began in November 1983 and basically ended in early 1985. It rectified the Party organizations in the leading organs at the central, provincial, municipal and autonomous region levels, as well as the headquarters, services and arms and major military regions of the People's Liberation Army. About 1.01 million Party members participated.

The second phase began in the winter of 1984 and basically ended at the end of 1985. It rectified the Party organizations at the prefecture and county levels, as well as equivalent factories, mines, colleges and universities, and research institutions. Approximately 10.02 million Party members participated.

The third phase began in the winter of 1985 and basically ended in April 1987. It focused on rectifying grassroots Party organizations below the county level, including Party organizations in enterprises and institutions below the county level and in urban streets. Approximately 28 million Party members participated, making it the most extensive and largest-scale phase of the Party rectification work. Specifically, it was divided into two batches: district/township-level Party rectification and village-level Party rectification.

From 26 to 30 May 1987, a national meeting was held to summarize the work of Party rectification. Bo Yibo announced that the Party rectification work had basically ended. After the meeting, the Party rectification work organizations at all levels were gradually abolished.

== Result ==
According to the report entitled Basic Summary of Party Rectification and Further Strengthening of Party Building delivered by Bo Yibo on behalf of the Central Steering Committee at the National Party Rectification Work Summary Conference, during this party rectification, the following were identified nationwide (excluding Guangxi Zhuang Autonomous Region):

- There are 5,449 people in the "three categories".
- 43,074 people were identified as having committed serious errors.
- A total of:
  - There were 27,919 individuals who committed serious violations of laws and regulations.
  - 13,154 people who “committed serious violations of laws and regulations” (see Guangxi Cultural Revolution massacres );

Through party member registration and organizational measures, a number of party members with serious problems and who were deemed unqualified were dealt with, among whom:

- 33,896 people were expelled from the Party.
- 90,069 people were denied registration.
- 145,456 people registered for deferred treatment.
- A total of 184,071 people were subject to Party disciplinary actions such as probation within the Party, removal from office, serious warning, and warning.

Those expelled from the party during the rectification campaign included:

- Yao Lianwei, an alternate member of the 9th and 10th CCP Central Committees and former Vice Chairman of the Standing Committee of the National People's Congress (expelled in 1984).
- Xie Xuegong, former First Secretary of the Tianjin Municipal Committee of the Chinese Communist Party, was a member of the 9th, 10th, and 11th Central Committees of the Chinese Communist Party (expelled in 1987).
- Wang Huaixiang, a member of the 9th and 10th Central Committees of the Chinese Communist Party and former First Secretary of the Jilin Provincial Committee of the CCP (expelled in 1985).
- Liu Xiangping ( wife of Xie Fuzhi, expelled in 1985), a member of the 10th Central Committee of the Chinese Communist Party and former Minister of Health .
- Weng Yongxi, former deputy director of the Rural Policy Research Office of the CCP Central Committee (dismissed in 1986)
- Ruan Ming, former deputy director of the Theoretical Research Office of the Central Party School of the Chinese Communist Party (expelled in 1985)

== Analysis ==
The top leadership of the CCP believed that, compared with previous political movements, the positive experiences of this rectification campaign are: First, it did not adopt the approach of large-scale mass movements, thus successfully avoiding the set of "leftist" practices that were prevalent in past political movements; Second, it did not interfere with the reform and opening up and economic construction at that time.

Yan Huai, who was working in the Organization Department of the CCP Central Committee at the time, believed that the rectification of the Party was a movement in which veteran cadres of the Party systematically cleaned up the middle-aged and young cadres who had participated in the rebellion during the Cultural Revolution. "The focus was on cleaning up the performance during the Cultural Revolution. The popular practice was to strictly examine how they rebelled in the early stages of the Cultural Revolution." Moreover, the "old Red Guards " who were children of senior CCP cadres and the rebels from ordinary families were treated differently, with the former being protected and the latter being cleaned up.
