= Liu Huaqiu =

Chinese politician (1939–2022)

- 刘华秋

Director of the Office of the Central Foreign Affairs Leading Group
- In office November 1994 – April 2005
- General Secretary: Jiang Zemin; Hu Jintao
- Foreign Minister: Qian Qichen; Tang Jiaxuan; Li Zhaoxing
- Preceded by: Qi Huaiyuan
- Succeeded by: Dai Bingguo

Personal details
- Born: November 1939 Wuchuan County, Guangdong, China
- Died: 18 November 2022 (aged 82) Beijing, China
- Party: Chinese Communist Party
- Education: China Foreign Affairs University

Chinese name
- Simplified Chinese: 刘华秋
- Traditional Chinese: 劉華秋
Transcriptions
Standard Mandarin
- Hanyu Pinyin: Liú Huáqiū

Liu Huaqiu (Chinese: 刘华秋; November 1939 – 18 November 2022) was a Chinese politician. He was a representative of the 13th National Congress of the Chinese Communist Party. He was an alternate member of the 14th Central Committee of the Chinese Communist Party. He was a member of the 15th and 16th Central Committee of the Chinese Communist Party. He was a member of the 10th National Committee of the Chinese People's Political Consultative Conference.

== Biography ==
Liu was born in Wuchuan County (now Wuchuan), Guangdong, in November 1939. In 1965, he graduated from China Foreign Affairs University and joined the Chinese Communist Party in that same year. He joined the Foreign Service after university. In September 1989, he was elevated to vice minister of Foreign Affairs, responsible for the Americas and Oceania. He also served as director of the Office of the Central Foreign Affairs Working Committee (later reshuffled as Central Foreign Affairs Office and then Office of the Central Leading Group for Foreign Affairs and Office of the Central Leading Group for National Security) between November 1994 and April 2005. In February 2005, he took office as vice chairperson of Foreign Affairs Committee of the 10th Chinese People's Political Consultative Conference.

Liu died from COVID-19 on 18 November 2022 in Beijing.

Party political offices
Preceded by Qi Huaiyuan	Director of the Office of the Central Foreign Affairs Working Committee; 1994–2005	Succeeded by Dai Bingguo
