= Qi Huaiyuan =

Chinese diplomat and politician (1930–2022)

- 齐怀远

Director of the Office of the Central Foreign Affairs Working Committee
- In office August 1991 – November 1994
- Premier: Li Peng
- Preceded by: Liu Shuqing
- Succeeded by: Liu Huaqiu

Personal details
- Born: Xia Xiong; 6 January 1930 Shanghai, China
- Died: 14 January 2022 (aged 92) Beijing, China
- Party: Chinese Communist Party
- Education: Tsinghua University; North China Renmin University; Heilongjiang University

Chinese name
- Simplified Chinese: 齐怀远
- Traditional Chinese: 齊懷遠
Transcriptions
Standard Mandarin
- Hanyu Pinyin: Qí Huáiyuǎn

Xia Xiong
- Chinese: 夏雄
Transcriptions
Standard Mandarin
- Hanyu Pinyin: Xià Xióng

Qi Huaiyuan (Chinese: 齐怀远; 6 January 1930 – 14 January 2022) was a Chinese diplomat and politician who served as director of the Office of the Central Foreign Affairs Working Committee from 1991 to 1994. Prior to that, he was assistant foreign minister in 1984 and vice foreign minister in 1986 and before that, a spokesperson of Ministry of Foreign Affairs between 1983 and 1984.

He was a member of the Standing Committee of the 9th Chinese People's Political Consultative Conference. He was an alternate member of the 13th Central Committee of the Chinese Communist Party and a member of the 14th Central Committee of the Chinese Communist Party.

== Biography ==
Qi was born Xia Xiong in Shanghai, on 6 January 1930, while his ancestral home was in Ezhou, Hubei. In 1947, he entered Tsinghua University, majoring in the Department of Mechanics. One year later, he went on to attend North China Renmin University, where he joined the Chinese Communist Party (CCP) in November. In 1950, he graduated from Harbin Foreign Language School (now Heilongjiang University).

He joined the Foreign Service in 1950 and had served primarily in the German Democratic Republic. During the Cultural Revolution in 1969, he was sent to the May Seventh Cadre Schools to do farm works. He was reinstated in 1971 and worked in the Chinese People's Association for Friendship with Foreign Countries. He was counsellor of the Chinese Embassy in the German Democratic Republic in 1974, and held that office until January 1983. In January 1983, he was chosen as director of the Information Department of the Ministry of Foreign Affairs, in addition to serving as a spokesperson of Ministry of Foreign Affairs. He moved up the ranks to become assistant foreign minister in August 1984 and vice foreign minister in March 1986. In August 1991, he was appointed director of Office of Foreign Affairs under the State Council, a post he kept until November 1994. He also served as president of the Chinese People's Association for Friendship with Foreign Countries from May 1994 to October 2000. He retired in January 2004.

On 14 January 2022, he died from an illness in Beijing, at the age of 92.

Government offices
Preceded by Qian Qichen	Spokesperson of Ministry of Foreign Affairs; 1983–1984	Succeeded by Yu Zhizhong
Preceded by Liu Shuqing	Director of the Office of the Central Foreign Affairs Working Committee; 1991–1994	Succeeded by Liu Huaqiu
Non-profit organization positions
Preceded by Han Xu	President of the Chinese People's Association for Friendship with Foreign Countries; 1994–2000	Succeeded by Chen Haosu
