= National Security Commission of the Chinese Communist Party =

National security council

National Security Commission of the Central Committee of the Chinese Communist Party
- 中央国家安全委员会
- Emblem of the Chinese Communist Party

Agency overview
- Formed: 24 January 2014; 12 years ago
- Jurisdiction: Chinese Communist Party
- Headquarters: Beijing
- Ministers responsible: Xi Jinping, Chairman; Li Qiang, Vice Chairman; Zhao Leji, Vice Chairman; Cai Qi, Vice Chairman
- Parent agency: Central Committee of the Chinese Communist Party
- Child agency: Office of the National Security Commission

Central National Security Commission
- Simplified Chinese: 中央国家安全委员会
Transcriptions
Standard Mandarin
- Hanyu Pinyin: Zhōngyāng Guójiā Ānquán Wěiyuánhuì

The National Security Commission (CNSC) is a commission of the Central Committee of the Chinese Communist Party (CCP) responsible for national security work and coordination.

The proposals to establish a commission related to national security originated under CCP general secretary Jiang Zemin in 1997, though it was never implemented due to the fear of concentrating too much power in one person. After the United States bombing of the Chinese embassy in Belgrade in 1999, the Central National Security Leadership Small Group (NSLSG) was established in 2000. The National Security Commission was established at the third plenary session of the 18th CCP Central Committee in November 2013, in what was considered a major regrouping of Party structure. Analysts regarded the establishment of the CNSC one of the most "concrete" and "eye-catching" outcomes of the Plenary Session, the culmination of a more than decade-long internal debate on whether China should have a national security council.

The commission has operated very secretively, being described by The New York Times as "one of the most secretive bodies of a secretive state". Its size, staffing and powers not being publicized. It additionally contains local committees in provinces, cities and counties, which focus on domestic threats such as dissent and protests. Since its establishment, the CNSC has been chaired by CCP general secretary Xi Jinping.

== History ==
The initial conception of the CNSC came during the Jiang Zemin era in 1997, with a proposal by Wang Daohan, later the president of the Association for Relations Across the Taiwan Straits. Jiang had taken interest in the United States National Security Council during his state visit to the United States that year. Out of concern that the establishment of such a body would give too much power to the leader, who would be head of both the commission and the Central Military Commission, it was never implemented.

The proposal was again reconsidered in 1999 after the United States bombing of the Chinese embassy in Belgrade due to concern over how long it took various state security agencies to gather information on the incident and make it known to Chinese leadership, leading to the establishment of the Central National Security Leadership Small Group (NSLSG) in 2000 to coordinate national security crisis response.

Xi Jinping later revived the idea as part of his reforms in the foreign policy and security sectors, as part of an attempt to overcome problems that have accumulated for many years. Its establishment was discussed as part of the Decision on Several Major Issues Concerning Comprehensively Deepening Reform at the third plenary session of the 18th CCP Central Committee in November 2013, during what was considered a "major regrouping of the top CCP power structure." Ministry of Foreign Affairs (MFA) spokesperson Qin Gang stated that the NSC would aim to combat the "three evils"; namely terrorism, separatism, and religious extremism.

The Politburo held a meeting to study and decide on the establishment of the commission on January 24, 2014, which decided Xi should be its chairman. The CNSC held its first meeting on April 15, 2014, where Xi Jinping articulated a concept of "big security", saying that China "should take an overall approach to national security, strengthen the confidence of the Chinese people in the path, theories and system of socialism with distinctive Chinese features, and ensure China's durable peace and stability." These definitions contain meanings of both domestic security and foreign threats.

Between April 2014 and 2018, the CNSC had no publicly reported meetings. In 2018, it held its second publicized meeting. Between March and April 2020, the Commission held its third publicized meeting, In May 2023, the Commission held its first publicly announced meeting after the 20th CCP National Congress in 2022.

== Purpose and functions ==
The CNSC is a leading small group. After its establishment, it was speculated that the CNSC would aim to consolidate political leadership of all components of the security apparatus controlled by the Communist Party, including those headed formerly by former Politburo Standing Committee (PSC) member Zhou Yongkang. These components would be combined into a single entity under the direct command of the General Secretary of the Chinese Communist Party. It was also speculated that it would deal with national security strategy, crisis management, and links with foreign national security agencies.

The most common explanation for the creation of the CNSC relate to the personal and leadership style of Xi Jinping, and, in the eyes of commentators, his ambition to seize power. These personal factors, however, coincide with China wielding a much greater level of national power. Xi wishes China to play a greater role in world affairs, and so a mechanism like the CNSC would allow it to plan and implement, from the center, "grand strategy" ideas and "big power diplomacy."

The CNSC would thus fulfill Xi Jinping's ambitions for "major-country diplomacy with Chinese characteristics," rather than the quieter foreign policy agendas of previous administrations. Having a National Security Council assists in China's own "self-identification as a big power in world affairs." This also requires a more advanced diplomatic capability, a task in which the CNSC is supposed to assist in.

The New York Times described the commission as "one of the most secretive bodies of a secretive state", whose "size, staffing and powers remain unclear". The meetings of the Commission happen roughly once a year, but mentions of the meetings usually only emerge in local party websites, where orders from the speech are summarized. The Commission additionally has local security committees in provinces, cities and counties, which focus on domestic threats such as dissent and protests.

== Membership ==
Since its establishment, the CNSC has been led by the CCP general secretary, with the premier and chairman of the Standing Committee of the National People's Congress serving as vice chairs. The director of the CCP General Office has served as the director of the CNSC Office.

=== 2017 Commission membership ===
The membership of the National Security Commission inaugurated on 17 February 2017 was as follows:

Chairman

- Xi Jinping (General Secretary of the CCP, President of China, Chairman of the Central Military Commission)

Deputy Chairmen

- Li Keqiang (Member of the Standing Committee of the Politburo of the CCP and Premier of the State Council)
- Zhang Dejiang (Member of the Standing Committee of the Politburo of the CCP and Chairman of the Standing Committee of the National People's Congress)

Standing Committee members

- Xi Jinping (General Secretary of the CCP, President of China, Chairman of the Central Military Commission)
- Li Keqiang (Member of the Standing Committee of the Politburo of the CCP and Premier of the State Council)
- Zhang Dejiang (Member of the Standing Committee of the Politburo of the CCP and Chairman of the Standing Committee of the National People's Congress)
- Wang Huning (Member of the Politburo，Director of the Central Policy Research Office)
- Li Qibao (Member of the Politburo, Member of the Central Secretariat, and head of the Central Publicity Department)
- Sun Zhengcai (Member of the Politburo, Secretary of the Chongqing Municipal Party Committee)
- Fan Changlong (Member of the Politburo, Vice-chairman of the Central Military Commission)
- Meng Jianzhu (Member of the Politburo, Secretary of the Central Political and Legal Affairs Commission)
- Hu Chunhua (Member of the Politburo, Secretary of the Guangdong Provincial Party Committee)
- Li Zhanshu (Member of the Central Secretariat, Director of the General Office of the Communist Party)
- Guo Jinlong (Member of the Politburo, Secretary of the Beijing Municipal Party Committee)
- Han Zheng (Member of the Politburo, Secretary of the Shanghai Municipal Party Committee)
- Yang Jing (Secretary of the Central Committee, State Councilor, member of the Leading Party Members Group of the State Council, and Secretary-General of the State Council)
- Guo Shengkun (State Councilor, member of the Leading Party Members Group of the State Council, Minister of Public Security, Party Secretary, Deputy Secretary of the Central Political and Legal Affairs Commission)
- Zhang Yesui (Party Secretary and Deputy Minister of Foreign Affairs)
- Yang Jiechi (State Councilor, member of the Leading Party Members Group of the State Council, director of the Central Leading Group for Foreign Affairs)
- Zhou Xiaochuan (Vice Chairman of the Chinese People's Political Consultative Council's National Committee, Governor and Party Secretary of the People's Bank of China)
- Fang Fenghui (Member of the CMC, chief of the Joint Staff Department)
- Zhang Yang (Member of the CMC, director of the Political Work Department)
- Zhao Keshi (Member of the CMC, director of the Logistics Support Department)
- Zhang Youxia (Member of the CMC, director of the Equipment Development Department)

Ordinary members (Undisclosed)

=== 2022 Commission membership ===
Chairman

- Xi Jinping, General Secretary of the CCP, President of China, Chairman of the Central Military Commission

Vice Chairmen

- Li Qiang, Premier of the State Council, Politburo Standing Committee
- Zhao Leji, Chairman of the National People's Congress Standing Committee, Politburo Standing Committee
- Cai Qi, Member of the CCP Secretariat, Politburo Standing Committee

Members

Chief of the General Office

- Cai Qi
