= International Department of the Chinese Communist Party =

Chinese Communist Party body

- Emblem of the Chinese Communist Party

- Headquarters of the CCP International Department

Agency overview
- Formed: 1951; 75 years ago
- Type: Department directly reporting to the Central Committee; Ministerial level agency
- Jurisdiction: Chinese Communist Party
- Headquarters: 4 Fuxing Road, Haidian District, Beijing
- Minister responsible: Liu Haixing, Head
- Deputy Ministers responsible: Shen Ying, Deputy Head; Chen Zhou, Deputy Head; Li Mingxiang, Deputy Head; Sun Haiyan, Deputy Head; Lu Kang, Deputy Head; Ma Hui, Deputy Head
- Parent agency: Party Central Committee
- Child agencies: Chinese Association for International Understanding; China Center for Contemporary World Studies; China Foundation for Peace and Development
- Website: www.idcpc.gov.cn/english2023/index.html

International Department of the Chinese Communist Party
- Simplified Chinese: 中国共产党中央委员会对外联络部
Transcriptions
Standard Mandarin
- Hanyu Pinyin: Zhōngguó Gòngchǎndǎng Zhōngyāng Wěiyuánhuì Duìwài Liánluòbù

The International Department of the Central Committee of the Chinese Communist Party, also known as the International Liaison Department (ILD) or sometimes by the abbreviation of its name Chinese name Zhonglianbu, is an agency under the Central Committee of the Chinese Communist Party in charge of establishing and maintaining relations with foreign political parties and other foreign organizations.

Established in 1951, the international department was originally tasked with overseeing relations with foreign communist parties. Under Mao Zedong's leadership, the International Department supported Maoist groups around the world. In the 1980s under Deng Xiaoping, the department started cultivating relations with non-communist parties. The department is CCP's primary body tasked with conducting diplomacy through party-to-party channels. During the Cold War, it played a particularly critical role in China's relations with other communist states.

== History ==
The department was established in 1951, and was tasked with overseeing relations with foreign communist parties, especially the Communist Party of the Soviet Union and the socialist bloc. The department's mandate became more important following the Sino-Soviet split, as the party began more aggressively seeking supporters for its position among communist parties operating overseas. Afterwards it maintained ties between the CCP and the Maoist parties around the world, often attempting to foment revolution abroad by funneling money and resources to left-wing and rebel groups.

In the 1980s under Deng Xiaoping, the department expanded its mission to include cultivating relations with non-communist parties, and shed its overtly revolutionary objectives. In 1981, the department established the Chinese Association for International Understanding. The department also operates the China Foundation for Peace and Development. In this era, the department sought to forge ties with "any foreign political party that was willing to meet with it." Under the guidance of Xi Zhongxun, the department embarked on a charm offensive to establish ties with foreign parties. In 1982, the CCP has ties with 14 communist parties, 3 socialist parties and 45 nationalist parties. By 1985, it had established or re-established ties with 84 communist parties, 28 socialist parties and 78 nationalist parties

With the end of the Cold War and dissolution of the Soviet Union, the ILD's expanded mission of engaging with parties across the political spectrum became more important. Since the early 2000s, the ILD has increased its global outreach. According to scholar Anne-Marie Brady, the ILD is "tasked with gathering intelligence on foreign politicians and political parties, and developing asset relations with them." In 2010, the ILD established the China Center for Contemporary World Studies (CCCWS), a think tank serving on the secretariat of the Silk Road Think Tank Association, which aims to "enhance positive feelings" toward the Belt and Road Initiative.

The department has grown in importance under the general secretaryship of Xi Jinping as an instrument of the foreign policy of China. With the stated goal of advancing Chinese-African party-to-party relations, the ILD and Central Party School of the Chinese Communist Party fund the Julius Nyerere Leadership School in Tanzania. The school opened in February 2022 with US$40 million in funding and is a physical venue for political and diplomatic exchanges between the CCP and African ruling parties, particularly from Tanzania, South Africa, Mozambique, Angola, Namibia, and Zimbabwe.

== Functions ==
The department is the Chinese Communist Party (CCP)'s primary body tasked with conducting diplomacy through party-to-party channels. It plays a critical role in China's relations with other communist one-party states, including North Korea and Vietnam. The department gathers intelligence on and influences foreign political parties, organizations, think tanks, and academics as well being tasked with finding ways to divide potential critics. As of 2019, it maintains relations with more than 600 political parties and organizations from over 160 countries.

== Organization ==
The department has 14 offices, 8 of which are regional bureaus. The departments international organization includes:

=== Internal organization ===
- General Office
- Research Room
- First Asia Bureau (First Bureau) (Note: Responsible for liaison with political parties and organizations in South and Southeast Asia.)
- Second Asia Bureau (Second Bureau) (Note: Responsible for liaising with political parties and organizations in Northeast Asia and Indochina.)
- West Asia and North Africa Bureau (Third Bureau)
- Africa Bureau (Fourth Bureau)
- Latin American Bureau (Fifth Bureau)
- Eastern Europe and Central Asia Bureau (Sixth Bureau)
- United States Bureau (Seventh Bureau)
- Western Europe (Eighth Bureau)
- Party and Mass External Affairs Coordination Bureau
- Information and Communication Bureau
- Protocol Bureau
- Cadre Bureau
- Party Committee
- Office of International Exchange Coordination and Management of Chinese Social Organizations
- Information Editorial Office

=== Directly affiliated institutions ===
- International Exchange Center of the Central External Liaison Department
- Center for Contemporary World Studies
- China Economic Liaison Center

Service Center of the International Liaison Department

- Contemporary World Magazine

=== Directly affiliated enterprises ===
- Contemporary World Publishing

== See also ==
- Chinese Association for International Understanding
- International Department of the Communist Party of the Soviet Union
- International Relations Department of the Central Committee of the SED
