= Kung Chao-Yuan =

- 龔照瑗

List of ambassadors of China to the United Kingdom of Qing dynasty to United Kingdom
- In office 1893–1896
- Preceded by: Xue Fucheng
- Succeeded by: Luo Fenglu

Personal details
- Born: 1836
- Died: July 20, 1897 (aged 60–61) Shanghai

Kung Chao-Yuan (1836 – July 20, 1897) was a Chinese Ambassador.

- In 1888 he was Shanghai Custom Taotai responsible for the public investment in the Huahsin Spinning and Weaving Company in Shanghai.
- From 1893 to 1896 he was sent by Li Hongzhang as ambassador to the Court of St James's and was concurrently accredited in Rome.
- In London he trapped Sun Yat-sen in his legation, and released him under British pressure.
- In 1896 he left London already seriously ill.
