= Lo Tsung-yee =

Chinese diplomat (1886–1963)

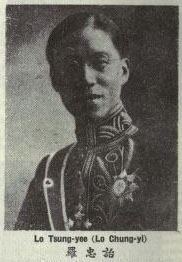
- Born: 1886
- Died: 1963
- Education: University of Cambridge

Lo Tsung-yee (Chinese: 羅忠詒; pinyin: Luó Zhōngyí; 1886–1963), courtesy name Yiyuan (Chinese: 儀元), was a diplomat of the Republic of China. He was the son of diplomat Luo Fenglu.

== Biography ==
After the establishment of the Republic of China, he served as Director of the Transportation Communication Office, Secretary of the Presidential Office, Secretary of the State Council, First Secretary and Chargé d’Affaires of the Embassy in the United Kingdom, Ambassador to the United Kingdom, Charge d’Affaires to Peru, Representative to the Extraordinary General Assembly of the League of Nations, Representative to the International Committee on Intellectual Cooperation, Representative to the International Armed Forces Reduction, Plenipotentiary representative of the General Assembly. He also served as Minister to Denmark from 1926. On October 10, 1935, he was awarded the second-class Order of Brilliant Jade.

He was appointed President of Tsinghua University on January 30, 1920, but he declined his candidacy.

In July 1928, the 1928 Summer Olympics were held in Amsterdam. Chengting T. Wang, a member of the International Olympic Committee, chairman of the Sports Federation of the Republic of China (ROCSF) and the Chinese Olympic Committee, was unable to attend the meeting due to him being busy, so Luo, then Chinese Minister in the Netherlands, was asked to attend the conference as an official representative of China. The ROCSF sent its honorary officer, Song Ruhai, to the Netherlands as a deputy representative of China to conduct an on-site inspection of the Olympic Games.

In September 1956, he was appointed as a librarian of Shanghai Museum. He died of illness in 1963. He was 77 years old.

Political offices
Preceded by ?	Chinese Ambassador to Denmark; 1926–?	Succeeded by ?
Preceded by Hsia Yi-Ting	Chinese Ambassador to Peru; 1920–1923	Succeeded by Shi Yu-ming
