= List of ambassadors of China to Guinea =

Coordinates: 39.944224°N 116.451230°E

Ambassador of China to Guinea
- Incumbent; Bian Jianqiang since November 2013
- Inaugural holder: Ke Hua
- Formation: March 1960; 66 years ago

The ambassador of China to Guinea is the official representative of the People's Republic of China to the Republic of Guinea.

== List of representatives ==
Designated/accredited	Ambassador	Chinese language zh:中国驻几内亚大使列表	Observations	Premier of the People's Republic of China	List of prime ministers of Guinea	Term end
March 1960	Ke Hua	zh:柯華 (外交官)	Ke Hua	Zhou Enlai	Ahmed Sékou Touré	May 1964
September 1964	Chai Zemin	zh:柴泽民		Zhou Enlai	Ahmed Sékou Touré	June 1967
July 1969	Han Kehua	zh:韩克华	(* 1 September 1919; † March 2003) Deputy Minister of Foreign Affairs of the People's Republic of China Han Kehua	Zhou Enlai	Ahmed Sékou Touré	June 1974
August 1974	Qian Qichen	zh:钱其琛	concurrently accredited in Bissau (Guinea-Bissau).	Zhou Enlai	Louis Lansana Béavogui	November 1976
February 1977	Peng Hua	zh:彭华 (外交官)		Hua Guofeng	Louis Lansana Béavogui	October 1980
April 1981	Kang Xiao	zh:康晓		Zhao Ziyang	Louis Lansana Béavogui	December 1983
October 1984	Yu Huimin	zh:禹惠民		Zhao Ziyang	Diarra Traoré	March 1990
May 1990	Jiang Xiang	zh:江翔	* From September 1986 to January 1990 he was ambassador to Burkina Faso.	Li Peng	Diarra Traoré	April 1994
May 1995	Kong Minghui	zh:孔明辉		Li Peng	Diarra Traoré	February 1998
March 1998	Xu Mengshui	zh:许孟水	From December 2000 to December 2003 he was ambassador to Cameroon.; From January 2004 to February 2006 he was ambassador in Mauritius.	Zhu Rongji	Sidya Touré	October 2000
November 2000	Shi Tongning	zh:石同宁	* From February 1998 to October 2000 he was ambassador to Burundi.	Zhu Rongji	Lamine Sidimé	April 2001
August 2001	Gao Kexiang	zh:龚元兴	From December 2006 till May 2009 he was ambassador to Rabat (Morocco); From November 2009 to August 2012 he was ambassador to Senegal.	Zhu Rongji	Lamine Sidimé	January 2004
February 2004	Liu Yukun	zh:刘玉坤	(* January 1953 in Shanghai): From September 16, 2013, to December 2010, he was ambassador to Tunisia.	Wen Jiabao	François Lonseny Fall	September 2006
November 2006	Huo Zhengde	zh:火正德		Wen Jiabao	Cellou Dalein Diallo	October 2010
October 2010	Zhao Lixing	zh:赵立兴	(* January 1954 in Liaoning)	Wen Jiabao	Jean-Marie Doré	November 2013
November 2013	Bian Jianqiang	卞建强		Li Keqiang	Mohamed Said Fofana	
