= Ke Hua =

Chinese diplomat (1915–2019)

- 柯华

Chinese Ambassador to the United Kingdom
- In office September 1978 – March 1983
- Preceded by: Song Zhiguang
- Succeeded by: Chen Zhaoyuan

Chinese Ambassador to the Philippines
- In office December 1975 – April 1978
- Preceded by: Position established
- Succeeded by: Chen Xinren

Chinese Ambassador to Ghana
- In office September 1972 – August 1974
- Preceded by: Huang Hua
- Succeeded by: Yang Keming

Chinese Ambassador to Guinea
- In office March 1960 – May 1964
- Preceded by: Position established
- Succeeded by: Chai Zemin

Personal details
- Born: Lin Dechang (林德常); 19 December 1915 Puning, Guangdong, China
- Died: 1 January 2019 (aged 103) Beijing, China
- Party: Chinese Communist Party
- Spouse: Zhang Ming
- Children: 3, including Ke Lingling
- Education: Yenching University

Chinese name
- Traditional Chinese: 柯華
- Simplified Chinese: 柯华
Transcriptions
Standard Mandarin
- Hanyu Pinyin: Kē Huá
Yue: Cantonese
- Jyutping: O^{1} Waa^{4}
Southern Min
- Teochew Peng'im: Gua^{1} Hua^{5}

Birth name
- Chinese: 林德常
Transcriptions
Standard Mandarin
- Hanyu Pinyin: Lín Décháng
Yue: Cantonese
- Jyutping: Lam^{4} Dak^{1}-soeng^{4}
Southern Min
- Teochew Peng'im: Lim^{5} Dêg^{4}-sion^{5}

Ke Hua (Chinese: 柯华; 19 December 1915 – 1 January 2019) was a Chinese diplomat who was Chinese Ambassador to Guinea from 1960 to 1964, Chinese Ambassador to Ghana from 1972 to 1974, Chinese Ambassador to the Philippines from 1975 to 1978, and Chinese Ambassador to the United Kingdom from 1978 to 1983.

== Biography ==
Ke Hua was born as Lin Dechang (Chinese: 林德常) in Lihu Town of Puning County, Guangdong Province, on December 19, 1915.

He entered the Yenching University in 1935, during his school days, he participated in the December 9th Movement. In April 1937, he visited Yan'an, where he got the chance to meet Mao Zedong. In November 1937, he went to Linfen, Shanxi to join the Eighth Route Army.

After the establishment of the Communist State in 1949, he became vice-party chief of Xi'an, Shaanxi. In December 1954, he was transferred to Beijing, capital of China, where he was appointed director of the Department of Protocol of the Ministry of Foreign Affairs. In March 1960, he was appointed Chinese Ambassador to Guinea, a position he held until May 1964. Then, he successively served as Chinese Ambassador to Ghana from 1972 to 1974, Chinese Ambassador to the Philippines from 1975 to 1978, and Chinese Ambassador to the United Kingdom from 1978 to 1983. Ke returned to China in 1983, and that same year, he was appointed counselor of the Hong Kong and Macao Affairs Office of the State Council. He was involved in the early stage of Sino-British talks on Hong Kong's future in the early 1980s. In 1988, he became a member of the 7th National Committee Standing committee of the Chinese People's Political Consultative Conference. He retired in 1995. On January 1, 2019, he died of an illness in Beijing, 13 days after his 103rd birthday.

== Personal life ==
Ke married Zhang Ming (Chinese: 张明), and the couple had three daughters. His youngest daughter, Ke Lingling (Chinese: 柯玲玲), was Xi Jinping's first wife.

Diplomatic posts
| New title | People's Republic of China Ambassador to Guinea; 1960–1964 | Succeeded by Chai Zemin |
| Preceded by Huang Hua | People's Republic of China Ambassador to Ghana; 1972–1974 | Succeeded by Yang Keming (杨克明) |
| New title | People's Republic of China Ambassador to the Philippines; 1975–1978 | Succeeded by Chen Xinren |
| Preceded by Song Zhiguang | People's Republic of China Ambassador to the United Kingdom; 1978–1983 | Succeeded by Chen Zhaoyuan (陈肇源) |
