= Puning =

Puning 普寧市 / 普宁市
- County-level & Sub-prefectural city
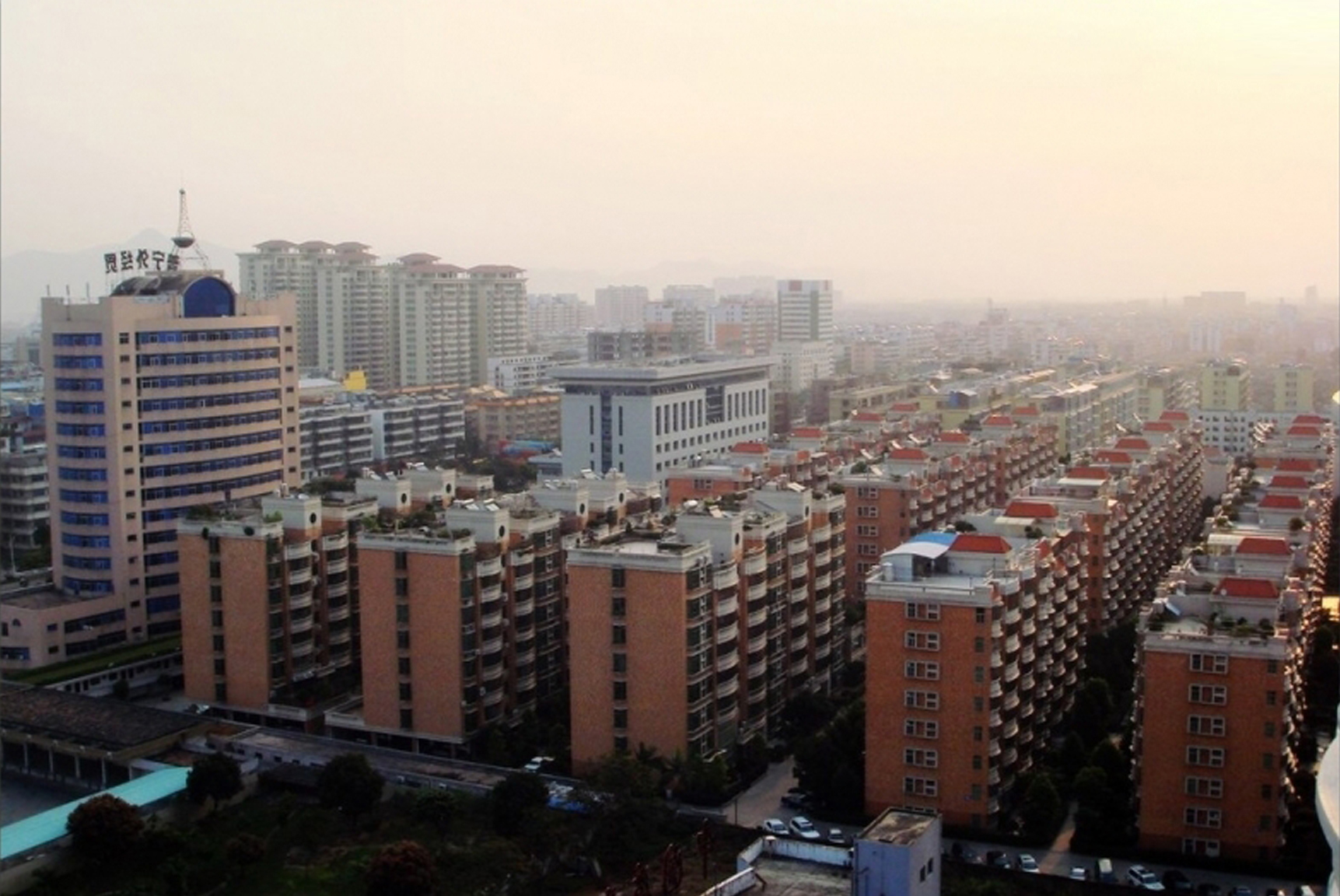

- Location of Puning within Guangdong

- Location of the city center in Guangdong
- Coordinates: 23°17′53″N 116°09′58″E
- Country: People's Republic of China
- Province: Guangdong
- Prefecture-level city: Jieyang

Area
  - Total: 1,620 km^{2} (630 sq mi)
- Elevation: 10.5 m (34 ft)

Population (2020)
  - Total: 1,998,619
  - Density: 1,230/km^{2} (3,200/sq mi)
- Time zone: UTC+8 (China Standard)
- Postal code: 5153**
- Area code: (0)663
- Licence plates: 粤V (Yuè V)
- Website: Puning Government Website

Puning (simplified Chinese: 普宁; traditional Chinese: 普寧; pinyin: Pǔníng; Teochew: Pou2 leng5), officially Puning City, is a county-level city located in eastern Guangdong, China, under the administration of Jieyang. Nevertheless, its administrative power in economic matters is comparable to that of prefecture-level cities. (Note: Puning City People's Government: 发展概况) Puning is geographically situated on the west rim of Chaoshan Plain, leaning against the stretching branch of the Lianhua Mountains at its southwest border, and 90 percent of its territory sits on the south of the Tropic of Cancer. The city has a population of 2.5089 million under its household registration system hukou, marking the largest in all county-level cities in China. Puning's downtown residents amount to 581,900, behind Yiwu, while the entire city's resident population of 1.9986 million is second to cities Kunshan and Jinjiang. It is concurrently the ancestral hometown of 1.95 million overseas Chinese people and 1.4 million 'returned overseas Chinese people' (overseas Chinese who 'returned' to China and/or regained Chinese citizenship) and family members of the overseas Chinese people.

Puning, having been a key trade hub in eastern Guangdong, was upgraded from county to city status in 1993. (Note: 陈朝辉、蔡人群、许自策：《潮汕平原经济》广东人民出版社，1994年) It is one of the first 'Chinese textile cities' and where the project 'Chinese TCM Cities' was first launched. Textile and apparel and medicine industries are local pillars, topping or coming second in Guangdong county economies since 2003. It also entered the list of the One Hundred Best Counties and Cities for Health Industry in 2020 by Xiaokang series of Qiushi magazine. (Note: 谁在引领健康产业走向下一个高地——“2020中国健康产业百佳县市”出炉.小康,2020年10期)

Historically, Puning was one of the eight counties of Chaoshan. In the mid-1900s, the Hakka region, which was historically part of the Huizhou Prefecture, was incorporated into Puning's territory. Subsequently, the city also welcomed back 'returned overseas Chinese' and 'family members of overseas Chinese' due to the political situation in Southeast Asia. The cultures of the various clans formed the multilingual, multicultural landscape of Puning, where customs and traditions differ across the towns and villages. It is recognised as a Chinese Folk Culture Art Village by the Ministry of Culture, China.

== Etymology ==
'Puning' is the pinyin transliteration of the city in Standard Chinese, also known as Mandarin or putonghua. It is also known as 'Pou Leng', Poh Leng, or Pho Leng in the Chaoshan language, also known as Chaoshan Min or Swatow dialect . It was named after the historical county of the same name, which dates back to the Ming dynasty of China. According to Puning Xian Zhilue (A Brief Account of Puning County), Guangdong Tongzhi (Comprehensive Records of Guangdong), Ming Shi (History of Ming), (Note: 《明史》卷四十五) and Chao Zhong Zaji (Miscellaneous Accounts of Chaozhou), (Note: [明] 郭子章:《潮中杂纪》卷1《郡县释名》) the name 'Puning' was given in 1563, after the phrase pubian ningmi, meaning universally serene. Versions mentioned the county's original name as Pu'an (Note: [清] 乾隆《大清一统志》广东卷) or Anpu, (Note: [清] 顾祖禹:《读史方舆纪要》卷103《广东四·潮州府》) but this was refuted by an inscription on the external walls of a Lords of the Three Mountains temple in Guiyu, Chaoyang, discovered in 1986. (Note: 陈竞飞：《去思碑与普宁县名》，1988年)

In 1949, the seat of Puning County was administered as Puning City. The city's territory was split in 1950. In 1993, Puning County upgraded to become Puning City, while the original 'Puning City' became its city centre.

== Economy ==
At the beginning of reform and opening up, Puning vigorously developed the commercial circulation industry while connecting with the international labor-intensive industrial transfer. In 1991, the purchase and sale of commodities had covered all provinces in mainland China except Tibet, which enabled the local economy to develop rapidly in the 1990s. Puning's local state-owned enterprises have been successively established as 11 enterprise groups, including supply and marketing, Baoning, Commercial, Hengda, Zhenning, Yongfa, Jiake, Lanhua, Jiechang, Songshang, and Jinye, and began to operate across regions and industries. At the same time, they withdrew from the main channels of local purchase and sale. State-owned industries in the telecommunications, financial and other industries have also been restructured into local branches. At the same time, the private economy has also rapidly emerged, and national brands such as Liby and Kangmei have emerged one after another.

The GDP of Puning in 2020 was RMB 61.358 billion, and the proportion of the three industrial structures was 7.1%:33.2%:59.7%.

== History ==
=== Before its founding ===
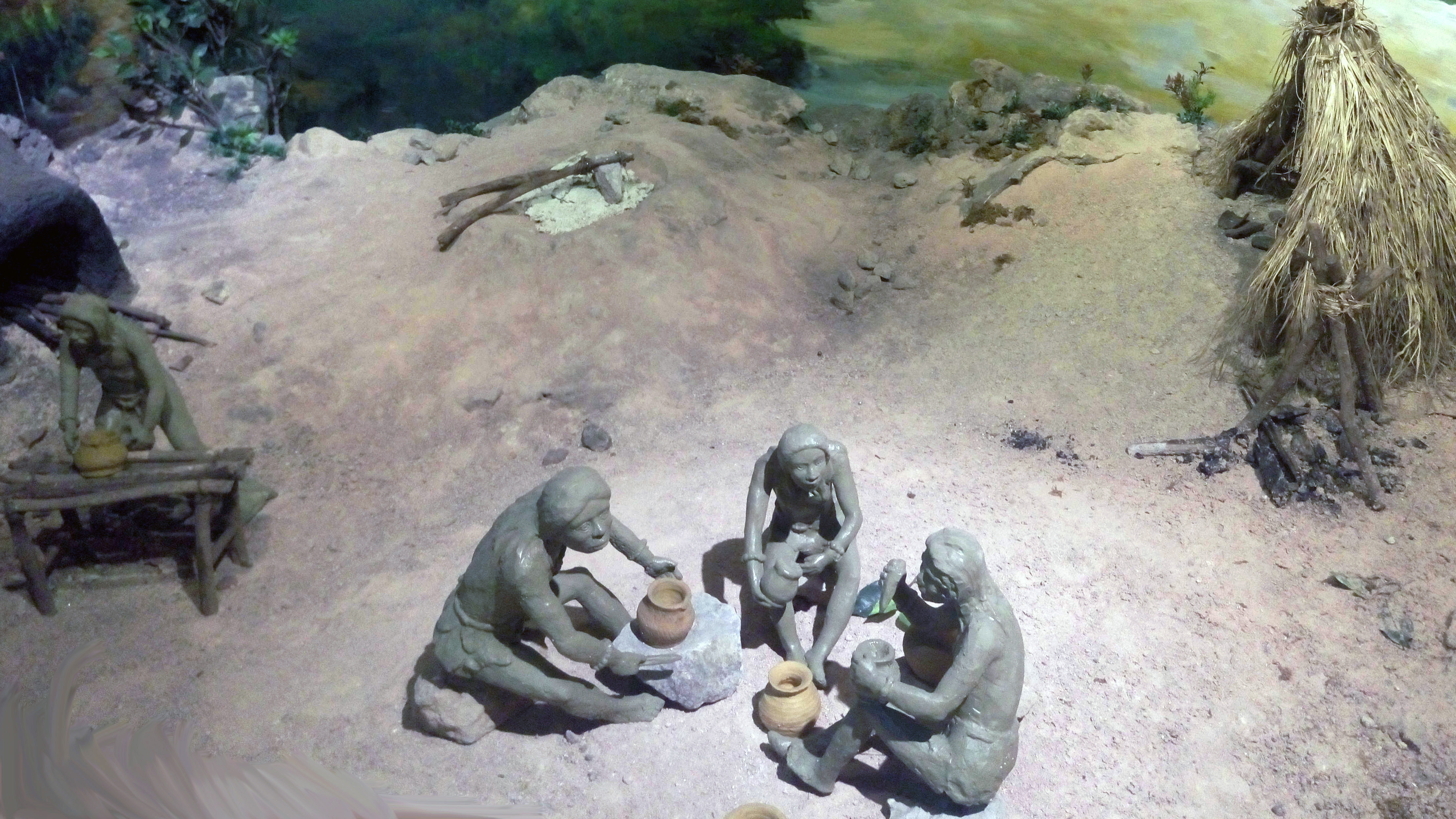
Reproduction scene of early humans making pottery at Hutou Pu Old Kilns Site

The habitation of humans in the territory of Puning dates back to the New Stone Age, evident in archaeological findings, such as the Hutou Pu Old Kilns Site (虎头埔古窑址) in Mianyuan Village, Guangtai Town, discovered in 1982. The tomb of a Sinicised Baiyue person, discovered in Songbaiwei Village, Lihu Town, illustrates that by the end of the Eastern Han period, Central Plains (Zhongyuan) culture had been introduced into Puning. (Note: 黄挺：《潮汕史简编》暨南大学出版社 2017年12月)

During the Pre-Qin era, the succeeding political regimes on Zhongyuan did not have any de facto administration of Puning and its surrounding regions. It was incorporated into Zhongyuan territories during the Qin and Han dynasties, but there had never been any clear administrative borders in the regions.

=== Ming and Qing ===
In 1558, Zhang Lian started a rebellion in Raoping and Dabu of eastern Chaozhou (Teochew) Prefecture and subsequently declared himself Emperor of the Feilong Empire. It was suppressed by the Ming Government in 1562.

During the Jiajing reign of the Ming dynasty, as population increased and land was further developed, the three du (都, du is a sub‑county unit) of Yangwu (洋烏), Zhenshui (𣴛水), and Huangken (黃坑) in the western part of Chaoyang County, Chaozhou Prefecture, gradually became prosperous. Yet these three du lay more than 170 miles from the county seat, making “distant administration difficult, and the region was repeatedly harassed by mountain bandits.” The Censor Chen Lianfang (陳聯芳) and the Governor-General Zhang Nie (張臬) submitted memorials stating that “it would be appropriate to carve out the three du and establish a county seat to facilitate governance, and name it Puning." In the dingwei day of the first month of the forty‑second year of Jiajing (20 February 1563), the Ming court approved the separation of Yangwu, Zhenshui, and Huangken from western Chaoyang and established Puning County, taking the name from the idea of “universal peace and tranquility” (普遍寧謐).

In the forty‑fourth year of Jiajing (嘉靖四十四年, 1565 AD), Zhao Yue (趙鉞), the first magistrate (知縣) of Puning, assumed office. The initial county yamen was set at Guiyu Village in Zhenshui du, where walls were joined to form a temporary fortified town. Six gates, including Jinxian Gate (進賢門) and Water Gate (水門), were opened, and the place became known as "Guiyu City" (貴嶼城). However, after the county's establishment, corvée labor and various levies increased sharply, and the court provided no further financial support for the new county administration. As a result, construction of a proper county city could not proceed. In the sixth year of Longqing (隆慶六年, 1572 AD), the Guangdong Censor (巡按) Yang Yigui (楊一桂) memorialized the throne, requesting that “forty to fifty thousand taels from the imperial treasury” (捐內帑四五萬金) be allocated to resolve the financial difficulties of newly established counties such as Puning. The reply, however, stated that “city construction shall not use treasury funds” (修城不用帑金). During the Longqing era, some proposed relocating the Puning county seat to Qianqiu Town (千秋鎮), the former site of Haining (海寧故城), but the plan failed.

In the third year of Wanli (萬曆三年, 1575 AD), the Fang and Li clans jointly petitioned to move the county seat to the Houyu area of Huangken du, declaring that they were “willing to donate land for the county site” and “cede residential plots for official buildings.” Due to financial constraints, Magistrate Liu Dun abandoned the temporary county seat at Guiyu in Zhenshui du and instead built city walls at Houyu. Because the site lay south of Hongshan (洪山), it was also called "Hongyang City" (洪陽城). In the thirteenth year of Wanli (1585 AD), the Chaozhou Prefect (知府) Guo Zizhang (郭子章) observed that the new city at Houyu "overflowed and flooded severely whenever heavy rains came" (遇水潦則泛溢成巨浸). He accepted the proposal that "Houyu must be relocated," selecting Anren Village to the northwest (today northeast of Meitang) as the new county site. Construction was overseen by Ruan Yilin. Because the chosen location was "broad, level, and elevated," it became known in historical records as "Dapu City" (大埔城), though it was never completed. In the fourteenth year of Wanli (1586 AD), the county seat was moved to Hongyang City (洪陽城) at Houyu Village (厚嶼村) in Huangken du (黃坑都).

=== Republic of China ===
In the 1860s, many Southern Chinese were caught up in the various Internal conflicts and later in the Foreign conflicts. Later, many Families ended up in Hawaii, the Philippines, Hong Kong and even in Thailand and Cambodia. Some of the educated classes married into Japanese Society. Other fled seeking Gold in USA and Australia and others became Traders across Asia.

==== Beijing Government ====
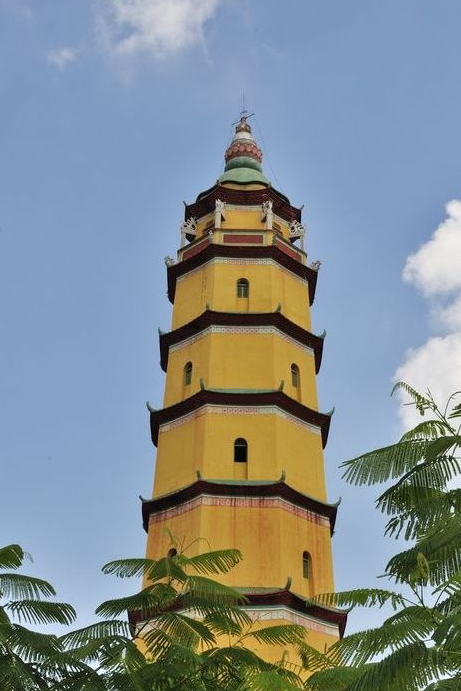
During the Constitutional Protection War, the southern forces had an advantage over the northern forces as they occupied the Peifeng Tower

===== Xinhai Revolution and Constitutional Protection War =====
In October 1911, the National Revolution Army (NRA) started a rebellion in Wuchang, while Fang Cishi (1887–1915) of the Tongmenghui dispatched troops in Puning. Guangdong declared its independence from the Qing Empire the following month and abolished the Chaozhou Prefecture, rendering counties such as Puning under the control of the Governor of Guangdong. Liu Renchen from the Tongmenghui also led his troops into Puning's city area. As a result, there were 13 different rival commanding officers in the Chaoshan region, all from different factions of the NRA. Meanwhile, influential figures in the county Puning supported Fang Zhiting as the county chief, (Note: 十兄、一士：《民国普宁县署轶事》，1990年) while Zhao Diyun was, on the other hand, appointed Chief of Civil Affairs by Fang Cishi under the name of the Chaoshan Military Government. However, Zhao's appointment was short-lived as he was hindered by local officials and influential figures. In April 1912, the Deputy Governor of Guangdong, Chen Jiongming, sent his trusted aide, Chen Juemin, as the Civil Affairs Chief. The administrative division of Chaodun Circuit was established in 1914 and Puning was drawn into it; the Circuit was abolished in 1920.

In 1917, Duan Qirui led his troops to attack southern China after he abolished the Provisional Constitution of the Republic of China, while Sun Yat-sen established the Constitutional Protection Junta in Guangzhou, sparking the Constitutional Protection Movement. Both armies fought outside the city walls of Puning, in the villages of Wuli and Minggang. (Note: 1988年版《普宁县志》，普宁市地方志编纂委员会编，广东人民出版社，1995年7月) On 25 May 1921, Puning was brought under the control of Chen Jiongming's forces once again.

===== National Revolution =====
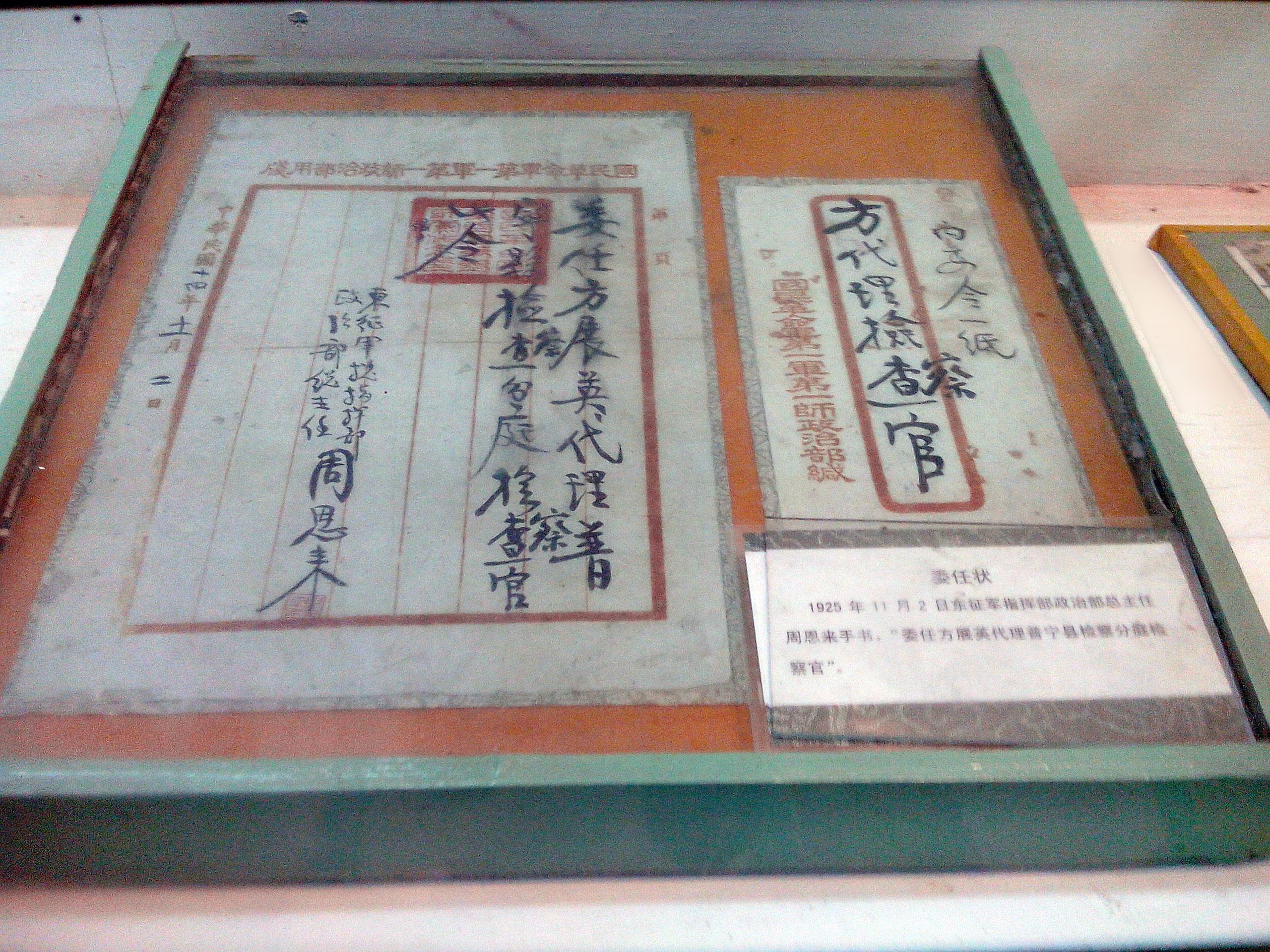
Letter of Appointment handwritten by Zhou Enlai during the National Revolution Army's second Eastern Expedition

On 12 March 1925, Chiang Kai-shek, He Yingqin, and Zhou Enlai led the National Revolutionary Army (NRA) to defeat Chen's forces in Lihu of eastern Puning. On 2 November 1925, the NRA arrived in the city area of Puning, and Zhou made speeches there to raise funds for the army. On the same year, the Government of the Republic of China in Guangzhou announced that the Chaozhou (Teochew) and Meizhou regions came under the rule of the Chinese Nationalist Party (Kuomintang; KMT). Fang Zhiting was appointed the chief of Puning while Fang Zhanying became the acting Prosecutor.

The Puning Farmers' Association established the Farmers' Free City under the Peifeng Tower located in the suburb in February 1926, and founded the Farmers' Self-Defence Army in December of the same year, attacking the city twice.

The Shanghai massacre in April 1927 had a repercussion on the county of Puning. The Chinese Communist Party (CCP)'s Puning branch joined forces with left-wing KMT members to stage an armed riot on 23 April, and subsequently set up the first county-level revolutionary regime led by the CCP through armed conflict three days later at the Chen (Tan) clan ancestral shrine in Jiujiang, Daba. The CCP declared war against Chiang Kai-shek in a public address to the Chinese nation. (Note: 《中共普宁党史》中共党史出版社，1994年) However, the Farmers' Free City regime and the CCP's Provisional People's Government regime ceased their activities as they lost their battle to the KMT.

==== Nanjing Government ====
===== Civil war and infrastructure development =====
In October 1927, the Nanchang Uprising forces retreated to Liusha and conducted a military conference in Liusha Christian Church on 3 October. The uprising forces were attacked and defeated by Chen Jitang's forces.

In 1928, Peng Pai led the Chinese Workers' and Peasants' Revolutionary Army into Puning and met up with remnant forces of the Nanchang Uprising, to discuss setting up a revolutionary base in the Dananshan Mountain area.

== Geography ==
=== Climate ===
Climate data for Puning, elevation 69 m (226 ft), (1991–2020 normals, extremes 1963–present)
Month	Jan	Feb	Mar	Apr	May	Jun	Jul	Aug	Sep	Oct	Nov	Dec	Year
Record high °C (°F)	29.3 (84.7)	31.5 (88.7)	32.0 (89.6)	34.0 (93.2)	35.4 (95.7)	37.6 (99.7)	38.1 (100.6)	37.4 (99.3)	37.2 (99.0)	34.5 (94.1)	33.1 (91.6)	29.5 (85.1)	38.1 (100.6)
Mean daily maximum °C (°F)	19.2 (66.6)	20.0 (68.0)	22.2 (72.0)	26.1 (79.0)	29.2 (84.6)	31.5 (88.7)	33.1 (91.6)	32.9 (91.2)	31.5 (88.7)	28.8 (83.8)	25.3 (77.5)	21.0 (69.8)	26.7 (80.1)
Daily mean °C (°F)	14.5 (58.1)	15.4 (59.7)	17.8 (64.0)	21.8 (71.2)	25.1 (77.2)	27.6 (81.7)	28.7 (83.7)	28.4 (83.1)	27.3 (81.1)	24.4 (75.9)	20.7 (69.3)	16.3 (61.3)	22.3 (72.2)
Mean daily minimum °C (°F)	11.4 (52.5)	12.4 (54.3)	14.8 (58.6)	18.7 (65.7)	22.3 (72.1)	24.8 (76.6)	25.6 (78.1)	25.4 (77.7)	24.3 (75.7)	21.3 (70.3)	17.3 (63.1)	13.0 (55.4)	19.3 (66.7)
Record low °C (°F)	−0.2 (31.6)	4.8 (40.6)	5.0 (41.0)	11.6 (52.9)	15.9 (60.6)	17.6 (63.7)	22.6 (72.7)	22.8 (73.0)	19.9 (67.8)	11.9 (53.4)	6.5 (43.7)	0.7 (33.3)	−0.2 (31.6)
Average precipitation mm (inches)	46.4 (1.83)	54.5 (2.15)	104.6 (4.12)	186.8 (7.35)	274.5 (10.81)	378.4 (14.90)	329.8 (12.98)	361.4 (14.23)	215.1 (8.47)	52.1 (2.05)	43.9 (1.73)	47.2 (1.86)	2,094.7 (82.48)
Average precipitation days (≥ 0.1 mm)	6.8	10.1	12.5	13.6	16.8	19.2	16.6	17.3	12.0	4.8	4.9	5.8	140.4
Average relative humidity (%)	74	77	78	79	81	83	80	81	78	73	74	72	78
Mean monthly sunshine hours	159.4	119.3	115.9	135.4	166.2	187.9	246.7	224.0	211.5	215.6	187.3	171.5	2,140.7
Percentage possible sunshine	47	37	31	36	40	46	60	56	58	60	57	52	48
Source: China Meteorological Administration all-time extreme lowall-time November high

== Transport ==
The Xiamen–Shenzhen Railway stops at Puning railway station along the high-speed Coastal Corridor.

== Notable people from Puning ==
- Cai Cheng - Chinese politician
- Ke Hua - Chinese politician, diplomat, and father of Ke Lingling
- Ke Lingling - former wife of Xi Jinping and daughter of Ke Hua
- Chuang Shih-ping - Chinese-born Hong Kong businessman
- Chan Tung - Chinese-born Hong Kong celebrity chef and TV host
- Chen Xinren - Chinese diplomat
- Zheng Zeguang - current Chinese Ambassador to the United Kingdom
- Zhou Zhenhong - Chinese politician
- Fang Zong'ao - Chinese scholar, economist, jurist, law professor, and economics professor

== Sister cities ==
As of May 2013, Puning established friendly relations with seven other cities in mainland China.

Country	Province	Sister City	Friendship forged
China	Zhejiang	Yueqing	8 October 1996
China	Liaoning	Haicheng	25 March 1993
China	Jiangsu	Jiangyin	23 December 1992
China	Hubei	Qianjiang	28 August 1993
China	Jilin	Ji'an	1 May 1997
China	Sichuan	Langzhong	9 December 2010 (Note: "四川閬中市與廣東普寧市結成友好城市" (in Traditional Chinese). 大公報. 13 December 2010.)
China	Zhejiang	Yiwu	13 May 2013
