= Wu Tao =

Wu Tao may refer to:

- Wu Tao (diplomat) (1940–2023), Chinese diplomat
- Wu Tao (discus thrower) (born 1983), Chinese discus thrower
- Wu Tao Chishang Lunch Box Cultural History Museum

== See also ==
- Hu Tao, a character in the 2020 game Genshin Impact
