= Ke Lingling =

First wife of Xi Jinping (born 1951)

- Born: 1951 (age 74–75); Puning, Guangdong
- Spouse: Xi Jinping (m. 1979; div. 1982)
- Father: Ke Hua

Ke Lingling (born 1951; Chinese: 柯玲玲; pinyin: Kē Línglíng; also known as Ke Xiaoming (柯小明, Kē Xiǎomíng) is the former wife of Xi Jinping, the current general secretary of the Chinese Communist Party (also known as the paramount leader). She is from Puning, Guangdong, and is the daughter of former Chinese diplomat Ke Hua.

== Personal life ==
In 1979, Ke Lingling married Xi Jinping, but their life philosophy differed. Ke wanted to move to the UK, where her father at this time served as ambassador, but Xi refused to accompany her. In 1982, they divorced, ending three years of marriage; they had no children. After they divorced, Ke immigrated to the UK.
