= Fu Ying =

Chinese politician

- 傅莹
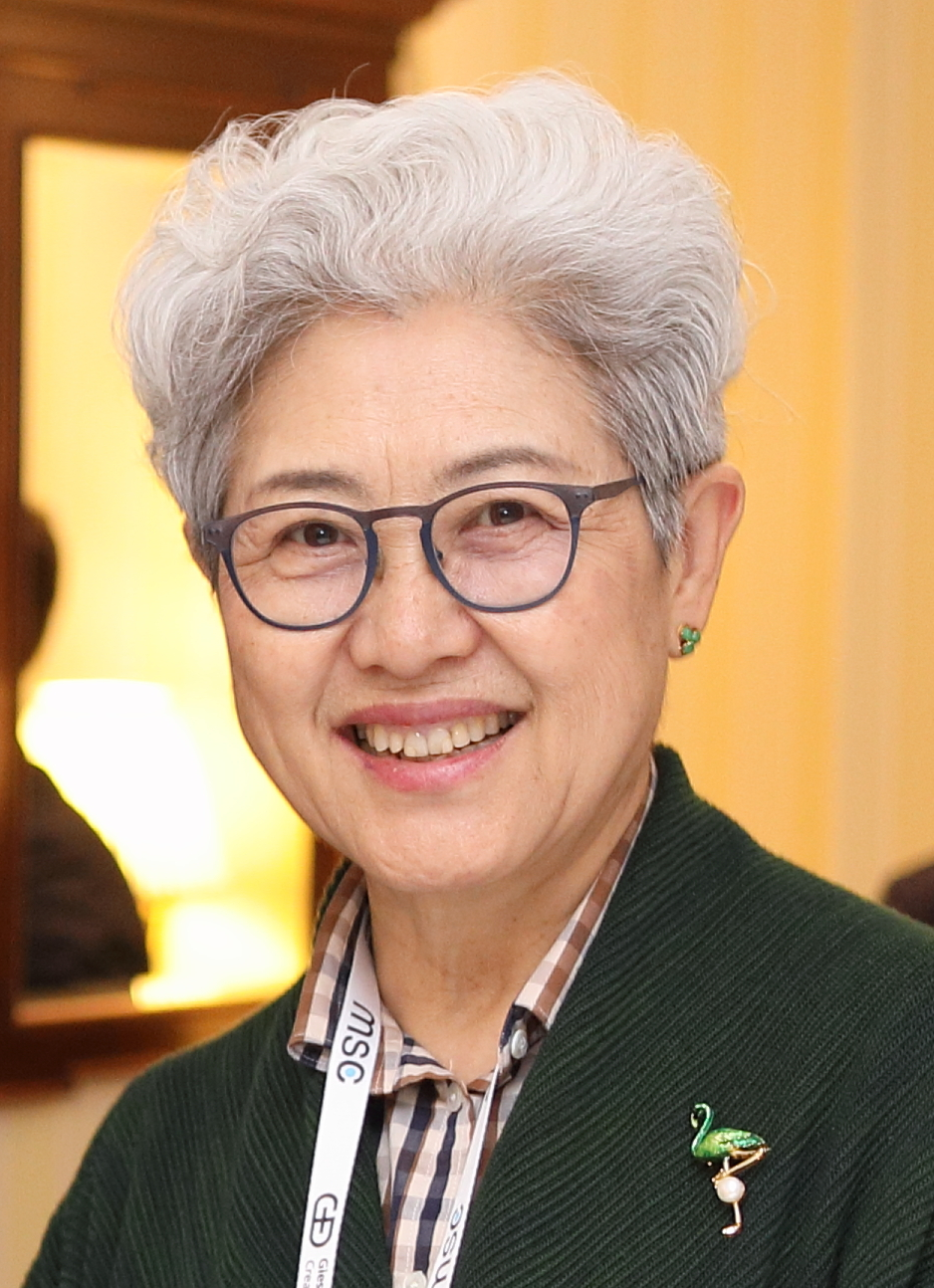
- Fu Ying in Munich, Germany in 2018

Chairperson of the National People's Congress Foreign Affairs Committee
- In office March 2013 – March 2018
- Chairman: Zhang Dejiang
- Preceded by: Li Zhaoxing
- Succeeded by: Zhang Yesui

Vice Minister of Foreign Affairs
- In office January 2010 – March 2013
- Premier: Wen Jiabao; Li Keqiang
- Minister: Yang Jiechi

Chinese Ambassador to the United Kingdom
- In office March 2007 – February 2010
- Preceded by: Zha Peixin
- Succeeded by: Liu Xiaoming

Chinese Ambassador to Australia
- In office March 2004 – March 2007
- Preceded by: Wu Tao
- Succeeded by: Zhang Junsai

Chinese Ambassador to the Philippines
- In office March 1999 – April 2000
- Preceded by: Guan Dengming
- Succeeded by: Wang Chungui

Personal details
- Born: January 1953 (age 73) Hohhot, Inner Mongolia, China
- Party: Chinese Communist Party
- Education: Beijing Foreign Studies University; University of Kent

Chinese name
- Simplified Chinese: 傅莹
- Traditional Chinese: 傅瑩
Transcriptions
Standard Mandarin
- Hanyu Pinyin: Fù Yíng
- IPA: [fû ǐŋ]

Fu Ying (born January 1953) is a Chinese politician and diplomat, best known for her terms as the ambassador to the Philippines, Australia, and the United Kingdom, as well as Vice Minister of Foreign Affairs.

== Early life ==
Fu was born in Hohhot, Inner Mongolia, in 1953. Her father was a student of Ai Siqi and she is of Mongol descent.

An ethnic Mongol, Fu Ying is the first woman, and the only ethnic minority woman, to serve as Vice-Minister of Foreign Affairs since 1979, and one of only two to serve in Chinese history. Fu graduated from the Beijing Foreign Studies University.

== Diplomatic career ==
In 1976, she became the official interpreter of the diplomatic service.

She led the Chinese Delegation during talks with North Korea that led to the latter country's decision (later reneged on) to abandon nuclear weapons. From 2004 to 2007 she was the ambassador to Australia. She was the Chinese ambassador to the United Kingdom from March 2007 to 2009. In February 2010 she returned to China and was replaced by Liu Xiaoming. She was Vice Foreign Minister from January 2010-March 2013.

In October 2012, Fu visited Manila in an effort to persuade the Philippines to continue bilateral discussions to address the South China Sea territorial disputes and to avoid involving the United States or taking the dispute to an international forum. The Philippines responded by initiating an arbitration against China.

During her time as Vice Foreign Minister, Fu stated, "The Chinese Dream is also part of the dream of many in the developing world who now have a great opportunity to grow their economy."

In 2013, Fu became the chairperson of the National People's Congress Foreign Affairs Committee.

On August 8, 2016, the Philippines dispatched former president Fidel V. Ramos to Hong Kong to mitigate tensions following the result of the South China Sea Arbitration. Fu met with Ramos and Wu Shicun (president of the National Institute for South China Sea Studies). Ramos conveyed the Philippines' willingness to engage in formal discussions with China and the three issued a statement in their personal capacities emphasizing cooperation and dialogue between the two countries.

=== Diplomatic style ===
Fu had criticized Western biases on China. While serving as vice-foreign minister, she explained that, in preparation for a 2011 interview for German magazine Der Spiegel, got her staff to prepare her for questions on human rights, the Chinese military, and reforms. Eventually, she adopted a strategy of deflecting "hostile" questions and assumed that Western reporters would always "start from a negative perspective of China." She had been described as "charming and soft-spoken" as a veteran diplomat in comparison with his contemporary, Chinese foreign minister Wang Yi.

== Education ==
She graduated from the Beijing Foreign Studies University. In 1985, she received an MA in International Relations at the University of Kent. She also was given an honorary Doctorate of Civil Law in 2008 by the University of Kent.

== Career ==
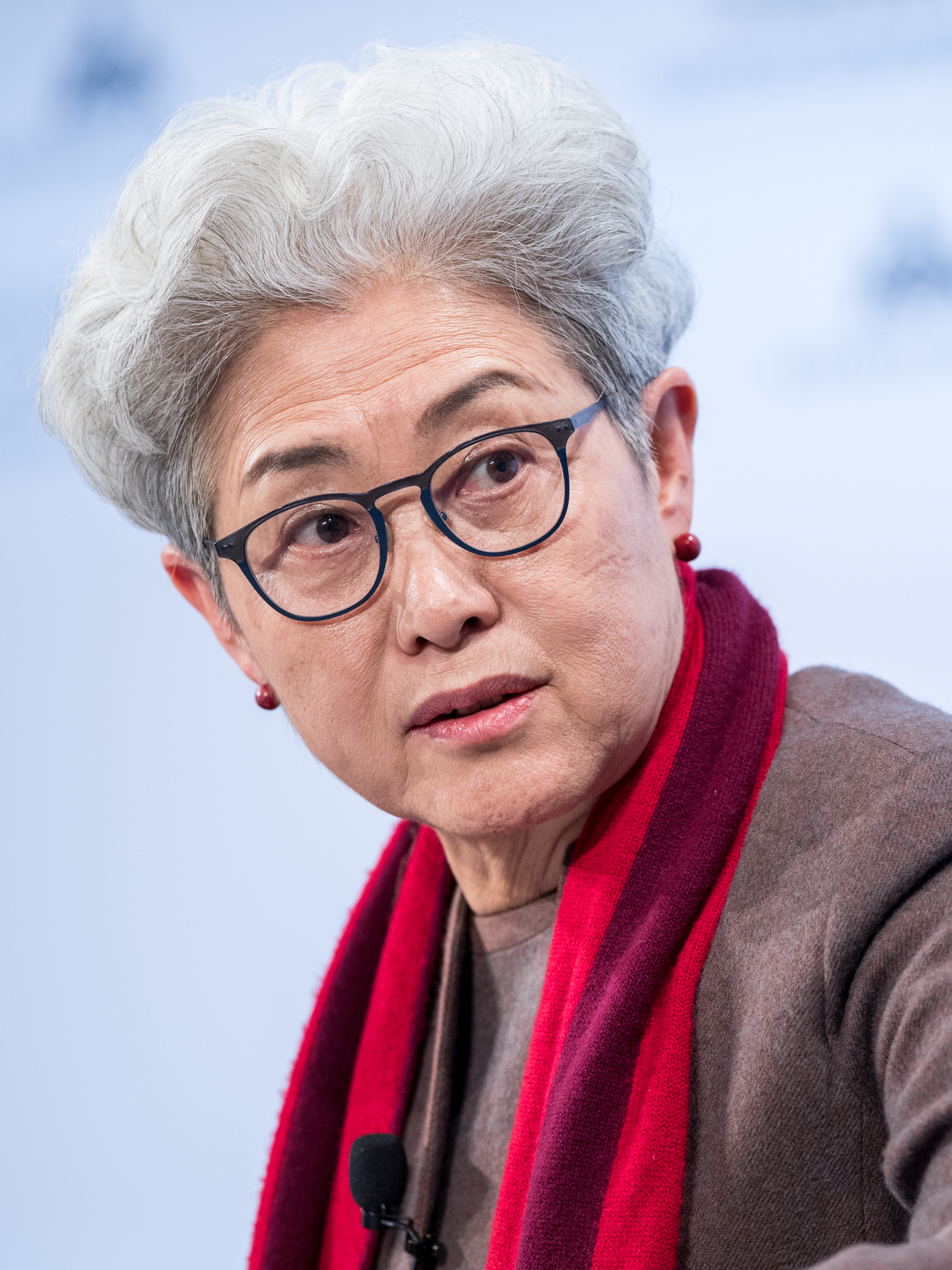
Fu Ying during the MSC 2018

- 1978–1982 Attaché, Embassy in Romania
- 1982–1985 Attaché, Department of Translation and Interpretation, Ministry of Foreign Affairs
- 1985–1986 University of Kent
- 1986–1990 Third Secretary, Second Secretary and Deputy Director, the Department of Translation and Interpretation, Ministry of Foreign Affairs
- 1990–1992 Deputy Director and First Secretary, the Department of Asian Affairs, Ministry of Foreign Affairs
- 1992–1993 Staff Member, United Nations Transitional Authority in Cambodia
- 1993–1997 First Secretary, Director and Counsellor, Department of Asian Affairs, Ministry of Foreign Affairs
- 1997–1998 Minister Counsellor, Embassy in Indonesia
- 1998–2000 Ambassador to the Philippines
- 2000–2003 Director-General, Department of Asian Affairs, Ministry of Foreign Affairs
- 2003–2007 Ambassador to Australia
- Mar 2007–2010 Ambassador to the United Kingdom
- 2009–2013 Vice Foreign Minister of PRC
- 2013–2017 Chairperson of the Foreign Affairs Committee of China's 12th National People's Congress
- 2017–2019 Vice Chair of the Foreign Affairs Committee of China's 13th National People's Congress
- 2019 Honorary Dean of Institute of International Relations and Chairman of Center for International Strategy and Security of Tsinghua University

A 2019 Report by the Hoover Institution of Stanford University stated that Fu Ying is the "senior figure in a growing number of US–China interactions," especially with U.S. think tanks.

== Personal life ==
Fu Ying tries to adhere to elements of traditional Inner Mongolian culture in her personal life. She drinks suutei tsai (奶茶, Hohhot-style milk tea) on the weekends, listens to the traditional Mongol long song, and eats Inner Mongolian food. She has one daughter by her husband, ethnologist Hao Shiyuan (郝时远).

Diplomatic posts
Preceded by Guan Dengming	Chinese Ambassador to the Philippines; 1999–2000	Succeeded by Wang Chungui
Preceded by Wu Tao	Chinese Ambassador to Australia; 2004–2007	Succeeded by Zhang Junsai
Preceded by Zha Peixin	Chinese Ambassador to the United Kingdom; 2007–2010	Succeeded by Liu Xiaoming
Assembly seats
Preceded by Li Zhaoxing	Chairperson of the National People's Congress Foreign Affairs Committee; 2013–2018	Succeeded by Zhang Yesui
