= Chan Tung =

Hong Kong chef

- Chinese: 陳東
- Born: 1954; Puning, Guangdong, China
- Died: 2001 (aged 46–47)
- Other name: Tung Chen
- Occupation: Chef

Chan Tung (1954-2001), Hong Kong's famous chef, was born in Puning, Guangdong. He was famous for teaching cooking in the TV programmes.

Chan learnt cooking in his father's restaurant since he was 10 years old. However, he did not gain any special treatment. In contrary, his father was particularly strict to Chan's performance. Based on the fundamentals of Chiuchow cuisine, he created many special cuisines and wrote books concerning about herb and soup.

Chan also promoted his cooking skills to entertainment field. Chan hosted as consultant and appeared in Stephen Chow’s film, God of Cookery (1996). Chan also cooperated with Stephen Au and Sara Lee to host a housewife TV programme in the Asia Television.

== Personal life ==
In 2001, Chan died of liver cancer at the age of 47.
