= Liu Xiaoming =

Ambassador of China to the United Kingdom

- 刘晓明
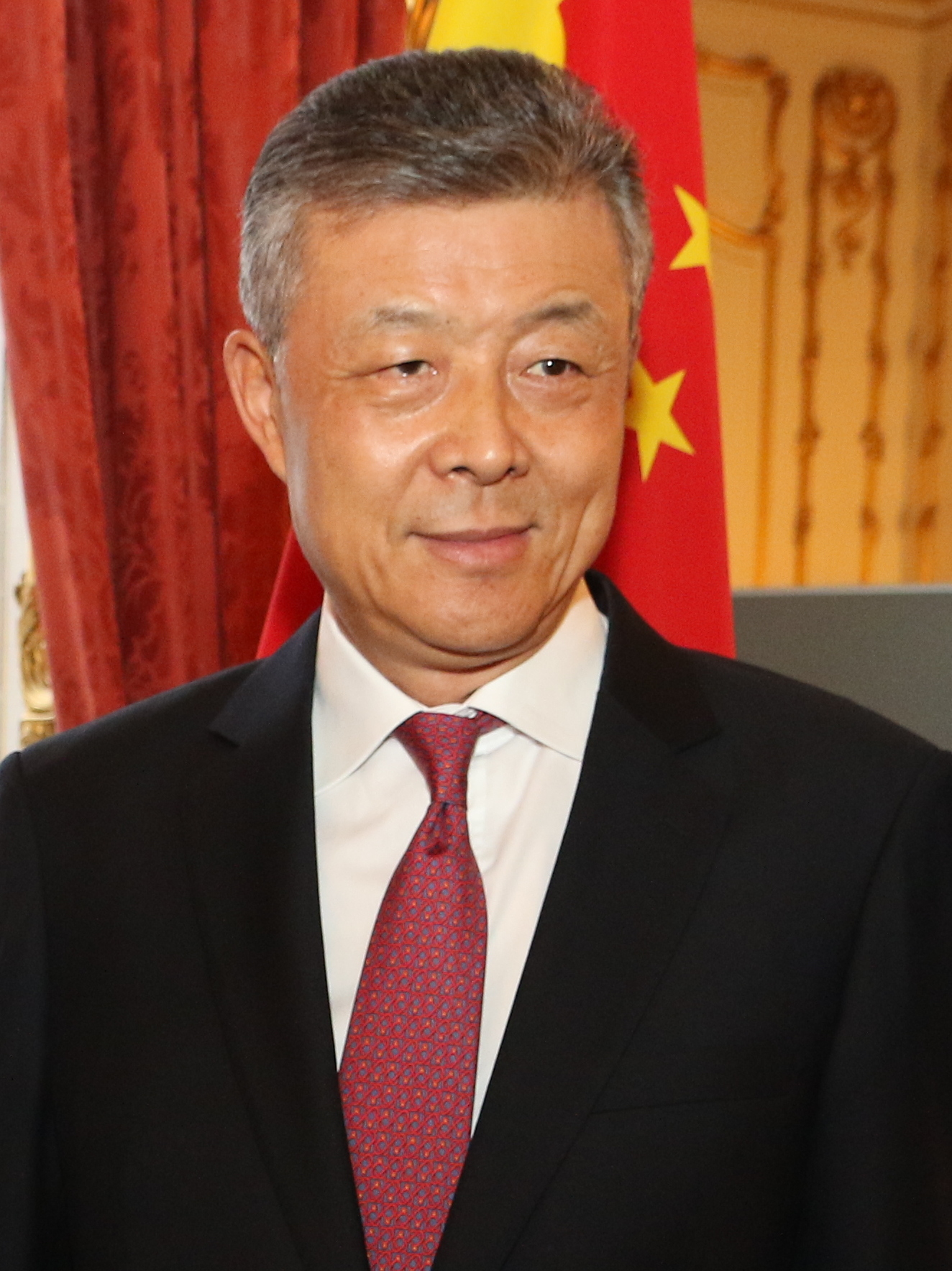
- Liu in 2017

China's Special Representative on Korean Peninsula Affairs
- Incumbent
- Assumed office April 2021
- Preceded by: Kong Xuanyou

Chinese Ambassador to the United Kingdom
- In office March 2010 – January 31, 2021
- Preceded by: Fu Ying
- Succeeded by: Zheng Zeguang

Chinese Ambassador to North Korea
- In office September 2006 – February 2010
- Preceded by: Wu Donghe
- Succeeded by: Liu Hongcai

Chinese Ambassador to Egypt
- In office April 2001 – September 2003
- Preceded by: An Huihou
- Succeeded by: Wu Sike

Personal details
- Born: January 16, 1956 (age 70) Liaoning, China
- Party: Chinese Communist Party

Chinese name
- Simplified Chinese: 刘晓明
- Traditional Chinese: 劉曉明
Transcriptions
Standard Mandarin
- Hanyu Pinyin: Liú Xiǎomíng

Liu Xiaoming (Chinese: 刘晓明; born January 16, 1956) is a Chinese diplomat who is currently the special representative of the Chinese government on the Korean Peninsula affairs.

Liu previously served as the Chinese ambassador to Egypt from 2001 to 2003, the ambassador to North Korea from 2006 to 2010, and the ambassador to the United Kingdom from 2010 to 2021.

== Early life and career ==
Liu graduated from Dalian University of Foreign Languages with a major in English and undertook further studies in the United States, obtaining a master's degree in international relations from the Fletcher School of Law and Diplomacy at Tufts University in 1983. After graduating, Xiaoming became a junior officer in the Chinese Ministry of Foreign Affairs. In the early 90s, Xiaoming served as Deputy Chief of Mission in Washington, D.C.

Between 2001 and 2003, Liu acted as China's ambassador in Egypt, and from 2006 to 2010 as Chinese ambassador in North Korea.

== Chinese ambassador to the United Kingdom ==
In 2010 he replaced Fu Ying as Chinese ambassador in the UK.

In 2014, Liu likened Japan to Lord Voldemort, the villain in the Harry Potter series, by writing in The Telegraph: "If militarism is like the haunting Voldemort of Japan, the Yasukuni shrine in Tokyo is a kind of horcrux, representing the darkest parts of that nation's soul." In response, Keiichi Hayashi, the Japanese ambassador to the UK, wrote an op-ed in the same newspaper headlined: "China risks becoming Asia's Voldemort".

In 2018, Liu published a signed article in The Guardian on the subject of the US-China trade war, noting that while China was still open to negotiation, the US is maintaining a position of unilateralism. In early May 2018, Liu noted that the North Korean government was closely watching the details surrounding the United States withdrawal from the Iran nuclear deal.

On November 24, 2019, a BBC reporter confronted Liu over the Xinjiang re-education camps at a press conference in London. Liu dismissed the claims as "fake news". On November 25, 2019, the Financial Times published a column by Liu. He said "I am convinced that flourishing educational co-operation is an important source of strength for relations between China and the UK". He further said "Recently, however, the House of Commons foreign affairs select committee issued a report accusing China of "interfering" with academic freedom in British universities. The charge is groundless and highly misleading".

On September 9, 2019, Liu warned the Government of the United Kingdom of making "irresponsible remarks on Hong Kong". Liu said "politicians were free to express their opinion – within limits". On February 6, 2020, Liu claimed his embassy had received reports of anti-Chinese racism at UK universities and schools. He said "I think there are many reasons for it. Lack of understanding of the epidemic. Of course, there is also some deep-seated racism. Not only in this country, but anywhere". On February 27, 2020, he said China will remain an "economic powerhouse, even after Covid-19". On April 4, 2020, the Evening Standard published a column by Liu. He said "As Covid-19 continues to spread around the world and the combat against the virus is at a critical stage, some politicians in the United States and here in this country, however, are spreading lies and stigmatizing China. A lie remains a lie even though it is repeated a thousand times. But we must also get the truth out." In May 2020, Liu said anti-China rhetoric is in danger of undermining international solidarity in the fight against the COVID-19 pandemic. He also said UK MPs were in a "cold war mindset". On July 4, 2020, Liu told students to "leverage their strength" as the UK overtakes the US as the most popular destination for Chinese students for the first time. He urged students to practice patriotism and "serve your motherland" — activities he described as the "foundation of all endeavor and the highest ambition in life" and also encouraged them to contribute to "China-UK exchanges and cooperation" and "bridge the cultural gap".

In July 2020, Liu denied that Uyghurs were being abused in Xinjiang in a BBC interview, despite being shown drone footage of what appeared to be blindfolded and shackled Uyghur and other ethnic minorities being herded onto trains. After being shown a clip of a woman claiming to have been subjected to forced sterilization, Liu blamed such reports on "some small group of anti-China elements."

In December 2020, it was announced that Liu was to retire from his post as ambassador and be replaced by Zheng Zeguang.

=== Huawei ===
On February 9, 2020, Liu said Tory politicians opposed to telecoms equipment maker Huawei playing a role in the UK's 5G network are conducting "a witch-hunt". On July 6, 2020, Liu said the UK will "bear the consequences" if it treats China as a "hostile" country in deciding whether to allow Huawei a role in UK 5G phone networks. After the UK Government's announcement that mobile providers would be banned from buying new Huawei 5G equipment after December 31, 2020, Liu questioned whether the UK can provide a "fair" business environment for foreign firms. He said "It has become questionable whether the UK can provide an open, fair and non-discriminatory business environment for companies from other countries."

=== Hong Kong protests ===
In July 2019, Liu criticized the British Foreign Secretary Jeremy Hunt, saying that it was "totally wrong ... to talk about freedom" after the 2019–20 Hong Kong protests and that instead it was "a matter about breaking laws in Hong Kong". The same day, Chinese Foreign Ministry spokesman Geng Shuang had said Hunt was "obsessed with the bad habit of criticizing and lecturing on other countries' affairs condescendingly". This resulted in Liu being summoned to the British Foreign Office to explain the "unacceptable and inaccurate" comments and Hunt warned of "serious consequences" if China exercised a human rights crackdown because of the protests.

In November 2019, Liu said that British politicians and the Foreign Affairs Select Committee were making "irresponsible remarks on Hong Kong" and that Western powers were "taking sides" in what he said were China's internal affairs. Liu also said in a tweet that countries interfering in Hong Kong were "only shooting [themselves] in the foot".

=== Hong Kong national security law ===
Liu said the UK's offer of a path to citizenship for up to three million Hong Kongers amounted to "gross interference". He told a virtual conference "The UK government keeps making irresponsible remarks on Hong Kong affairs". Liu further said "We have do decide our counter-measures in accordance with the actual actions taken by the British side."

=== Twitter incident ===
In September 2020, Liu's Twitter account was discovered to have "liked" a 10-second video of a woman using her feet to perform a sexual act on a man. In response, the Chinese embassy released a press statement, saying "some anti-China elements viciously attacked Ambassador Liu Xiaoming's Twitter account and employed despicable methods to deceive the public", and urged Twitter to investigate the matter.

== Korean Peninsula affairs representative ==
On April 13, 2021, Liu was appointed to work on matters concerning the Korean Peninsula replacing Kong Xuanyou.

In September 2022, Liu attended the funeral of Elizabeth II in London alongside Chinese Vice President Wang Qishan.
