= Song Zhiguang =

Chinese diplomat and ambassador (1916–2005)

Song Zhiguang (Chinese: 宋之光) (1916–2005) was a Chinese diplomat. He was born in Panyu District, Guangzhou, Guangdong. He was Ambassador of the People's Republic of China to the East Germany (1970–1972), United Kingdom (1972–1977) and Japan (1982–1985).

Diplomatic posts
Preceded by Zhang Haifeng	Ambassador of China to East Germany; 1970–1972	Succeeded by Peng Guangwei
Preceded by New office	Ambassador of China to the United Kingdom; 1972–1977	Succeeded by Ke Hua
Preceded by Fu Hao	Ambassador of China to Japan; 1982–1985	Succeeded by Zhang Shu
