= Fang Zong'ao =

- 方宗鳌
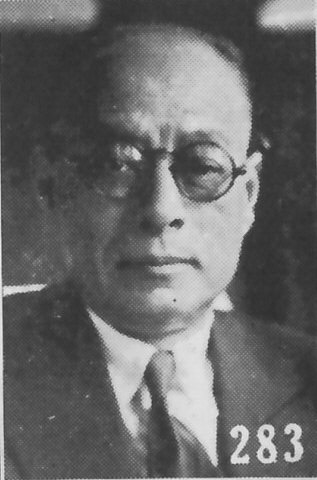
- Fang Zong'ao as pictured in The Most Recent Biographies of Chinese Dignitaries

Personal details
- Born: 1884 Puning, Guangdong, Qing dynasty
- Died: 19 February 1950 (aged 65–66) Beijing, People's Republic of China
Fang Zong'ao
- Traditional Chinese: 方宗鰲
- Simplified Chinese: 方宗鳌
Transcriptions
Standard Mandarin
- Hanyu Pinyin: Fāng Zōngáo
- Wade–Giles: Fang^{1} Tsung^{1}-ao^{2}
Yue: Cantonese
- Jyutping: Fong^{1} Zung^{1}ngou^{4}
Southern Min
- Teochew Peng'im: Beng^{1} Zong^{1}ngao^{5}

Fang Zong'ao (Chinese: 方宗鳌; Wade–Giles: Fang Tsung-ao; 1884 – 19 February 1950) was a late Qing dynasty scholar; a well-known economist and jurist in the early Republic of China era, and a professor in economics and law.

Fang was born in Puning, Guangdong Province, China, in 1884. In 1903, Fang went to Toa Dobunshoin (東亜同文書院大学) for study. In 1905, Fang returned to his home town Puning after he graduated from the college and established a teachers' college in Puning. In 1908, Fang was granted a scholarship from Qing dynasty government and went to Japan again for his studies. After graduating from Yamaguchi Business School in Yamaguchi Prefecture Fang was admitted to Meiji University. Fang graduated from Meiji University in 1914 and married a Japanese noble's descendant, Koga Yasuhisa's (古賀靖久) daughter Koga Masako (古賀政子), a student at Tsuda College. Fang returned to China after the wedding. About a year after his return, Fang left his hometown Puning for Beijing to pursue his career.

During the time he stayed in Japan, Fang was appointed as a Political Affairs Director of the Tokyo Branch of the Progressive Party of the Republic of China.

Shortly after settling in Beijing, Fang was introduced by the Chinese High Commissioner to Tokyo (Wang Da-xie (汪大夑), who later became the Foreign Affairs Minister) to work at the Reserve Bank of China as a principal auditor. Fang spent his spare time teaching economics courses at several universities as a part-time professor. Soon, he became a full-time professor at Zhongguo University (University of China) (中國大學), Peking University and Chaoyang University (朝陽大學). He served as the provost and dean of business studies of the University of China until 1937.

In 1937, the Republic of China Provisional Government was established in Beijing. Fang was appointed as the Vice Minister of the Ministry of Education and Secretary General of the Legislation Council of the Provisional Government. When Minister Tang Er-he (汤尔和) was in the hospital in 1939, Fang served as the Acting Minister until Tang's death in 1940. Later, in 1940, when the Republic of China Nanjing National Government was established in Nanjing, Fang was appointed as the Vice Minister of Education of the North China Political Affairs Commission. During that period, Fang re-established the universities in Northern China to provide opportunities for students to continue their studies in Japanese-occupied regions. Fang also established the Law School of Peking University, and he was appointed as the first Head of the school. Fang was also selected as a board member of the China Federal Reserve Bank.

Fang died on 19 February 1950 in Beijing at the age of 66.

== Family ==
Fang's father was Fang Mei-feng (方眉峰). Fang had five sons: Fang Jisheng (方纪生), Fang Shiao Tzu (方孝慈), (Japanese: Hideo - 秀夫), Fang (Victor) Tse Tzu (方则慈), Fang Hong Tzu (方鸿慈), and Fang Shao Tzu (方绍慈), and three daughters: Fang Xiu Ching (方秀卿 (Hedi Pinheiro), Fang Wen Ching (方文卿 - 婚后改: 方青) and Fang Li Ching (方丽卿).
