= Chuang Shih-ping =

Hong Kong businessman (1911–2007)

The Honourable Chuang Shih-ping GBM
- 莊世平

Chair of the Nanyang Commercial Bank
- In office 14 December 1949 – 1986

Personal details
- Born: 20 January 1911 Puning, Guangdong, Qing dynasty
- Died: 2 June 2007 (aged 96) Hong Kong

Chuang Shih-ping
- Traditional Chinese: 庄世平
- Simplified Chinese: 莊世平
Transcriptions

Chuang Shih-ping, GBM (Chinese: 莊世平, 20 January 1911 – 2 June 2007) was a Hong Kong businessman who was the founder of the Hong Kong Nanyang Commercial Bank in 1949 and the Macau Banco Nan Tung in 1950. Zhuang was born in Puning, Guangdong and he came to Hong Kong in 1947. As a member of the pro-Beijing camp, Chuang was appointed a member of the Standing Committee of the CPPCC National Committee and a local National People's Congress delegate by the Chinese government. He was awarded the Grand Bauhinia Medal in July 1997 and was among the first to receive this honor.

Chuang died in Hong Kong from Heart failure on 2 June 2007. He was 96.
