= List of ambassadors of China to Australia =

Ambassador of China to Australia
- 中国驻澳大利亚大使
- National emblem of China
- Incumbent; Liu Jinsong since 24 August 2026
- Ministry of Foreign Affairs; Embassy of China, Canberra
- Appointer: The president pursuant to a National People's Congress Standing Committee decision
- Inaugural holder: Guo Songtao
- Formation: September 1941; 85 years ago
- Website: Chinese Embassy – Canberra

The ambassador of China to Australia is the official representative of the People's Republic of China to the Commonwealth of Australia.

== List of ambassadors ==
=== Republic of China (1941–1972) ===
| Name | Start | End | Notes |
|---|---|---|---|
| Hsu Mo | September 1941 | March 1945 | |
| Cheng Yi-tung | September 1945 | June 1946 | |
| Kan Nai-Kuang | August 1948 | March 1951 | |
| Chen Tai-chu | March 1951 | July 1953 | |
| Hu Ching Yao | July 1953 | ? | |
| Chen Chih-Mai | September 1959 | October 1966 | |
| James Shen | October 1966 | July 1968 | |
| Sampson Shen | July 1968 | December 1972 | |

=== People's Republic of China (1973–present) ===
| Name | Start | End | Notes |
|---|---|---|---|
| Wang Guoquan | May 1973 | April 1975 | |
| Zhou Qiuye | August 1976 | May 1978 | |
| Lin Ping | November 1978 | July 1983 | |
| Nie Gongcheng | November 1983 | October 1986 | |
| Zhang Zai | November 1986 | August 1990 | |
| Shi Chunlai | September 1990 | November 1993 | |
| Hua Junze | November 1993 | June 1998 | |
| Zhou Wenzhong | July 1998 | March 2001 | |
| Wu Tao | August 2001 | December 2003 | |
| Fu Ying | March 2004 | March 2007 | |
| Zhang Junsai | March 2007 | October 2010 | |
| Chen Yuming | October 2010 | August 2013 | |
| Ma Zhaoxu | August 2013 | March 2016 | |
| Cheng Jingye | May 2016 | October 2021 | |
| Xiao Qian | January 2022 | July 2026 | |
| Liu Jinsong | August 2026 | Incumbent | |

== See also ==
- List of ambassadors of Australia to China
