= Zheng Zeguang =

Chinese diplomat

- 郑泽光
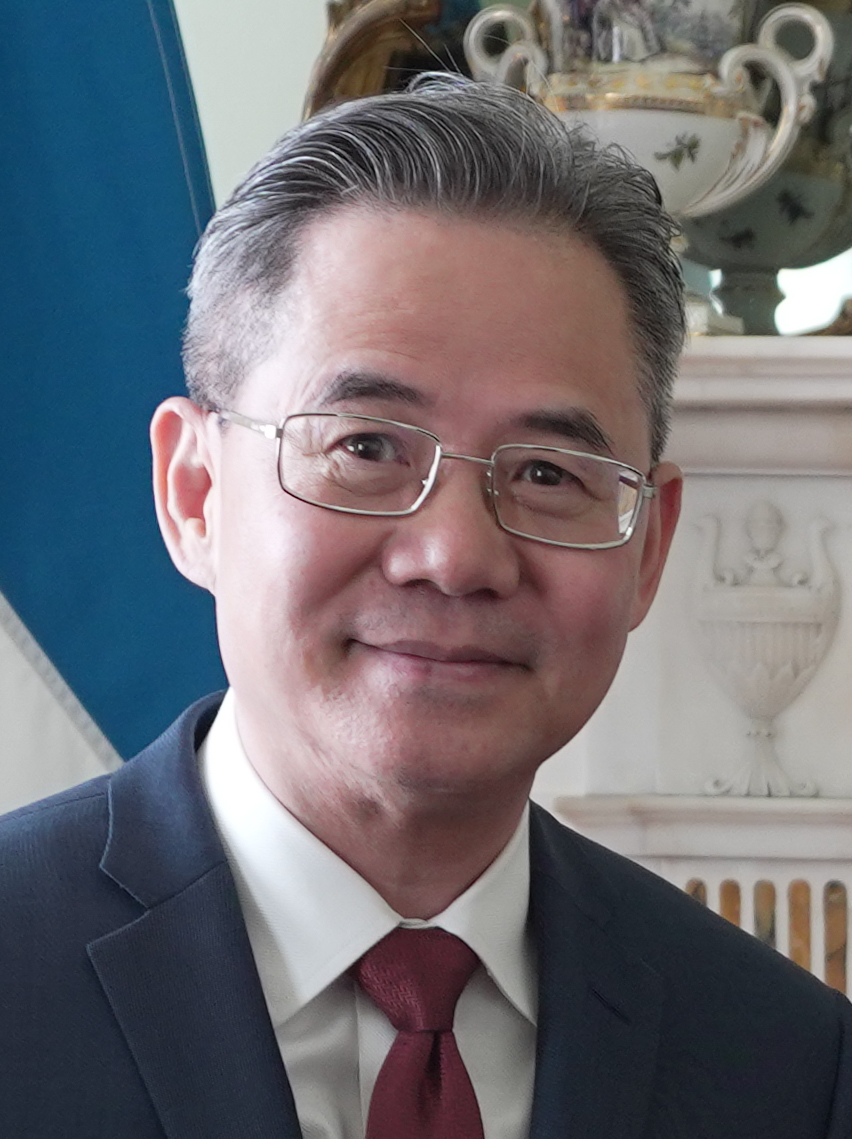
- Zheng in 2024

Chinese Ambassador to the United Kingdom
- Incumbent
- Assumed office 8 June 2021
- Preceded by: Liu Xiaoming

Vice-Minister of Foreign Affairs
- In office 2015–2021
- Minister: Wang Yi
- Succeeded by: Xie Feng

Assistant Minister of Foreign Affairs
- In office 2013–2015
- Minister: Wang Yi

Personal details
- Born: October 1963 (age 62–63) Puning, Guangdong, China
- Party: Chinese Communist Party (1986-present)
- Education: South China Normal University; Cardiff School of Law and Politics

Zheng Zeguang (Chinese: 郑泽光; born October 1963) is a Chinese diplomat serving as the Chinese Ambassador to the United Kingdom, and former Vice Minister of Foreign Affairs of China.

== Biography ==
Zheng was born in October 1963 in Nanjing village in Guangdong Province of China. His father was a buyer for the Meitang people's commune.

After the Cultural Revolution ended and schools reopened, Zheng enrolled himself into Puning No. 2 High School and Puning County Normal College, a high-school-level teacher training college, in 1978. He went to Puning No. 2 High School for seven weeks, until the admission offer from Puning County Normal College arrived. He switched schools to the normal college to study English. After graduating from the school in 1980, he taught English at a middle school in Nanjing village. In 1982, he took the gaokao and was offered a place at South China Normal University. After graduating from the university, Zheng entered a translation class held by the Ministry of Foreign Affairs and became a diplomat.

Zheng also studied law at Cardiff University. He joined the Ministry of Foreign Affairs in 1986 and has had placements in Trinidad and Tobago and the United States. Zheng is considered an expert on China–United States relations, having specialised in that field since 1990; he was thought to be a leading contender to be ambassador to the United States.

As of September 2021, he is banned from the British Parliament while Chinese sanctions on British MPs remain.

He was appointed as a member of the 14th National Committee of the Chinese People's Political Consultative Conference on 17 January 2023 from the Friendship with Foreign Countries Sector.

He was summoned by the UK Foreign Office in May 2024 after three individuals in the UK were charged with assisting the foreign intelligence service of Hong Kong.

== See also ==
- Liu Xiaoming
- Embassy of China, London
- Ministry of Foreign Affairs of the People's Republic of China

Political offices
Preceded by Liu Xiaoming	Ambassador of China to the United Kingdom; 2021 - present	Incumbent
