= Wu Tao (diplomat) =

Chinese diplomat

Ambassador of China to Portugal
- In office 1 February 1993 – 1 July 1994
- Preceded by: Guo Jiading
- Succeeded by: Wei Dong

Ambassador of China to Russia
- In office September 1998 – July 2001
- Preceded by: Li Fenglin
- Succeeded by: Zhang Deguang

Ambassador of China to Australia
- In office August 2001 – December 2003
- Preceded by: Zhou Wenzhong
- Succeeded by: Fu Ying

Personal details
- Born: 13 November 1940 Beijing, China
- Died: 8 January 2023 (aged 82) Beijing, China

Wu Tao (Chinese: 武韬, 13 November 1940 – 8 January 2023) was a Chinese diplomat.

== Life and career ==
Wu Tao served as Chinese ambassador to Portugal from 1992 to 1994, then ambassador to Russia from 1998 to 2001, and ambassador to Australia from 2001 to 2003. He also served as Deputy Foreign Minister from 1994 to 1998.

Wu Tao died of COVID-19 on 8 January 2023 in Beijing, aged 82.
