= List of ambassadors of China to the United Kingdom =

Ambassador of China to the United Kingdom
- 中国驻英国大使
- National emblem of China

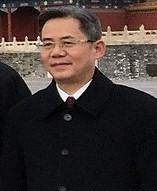
- Incumbent; Zheng Zeguang since 8 June 2021
- Ministry of Foreign Affairs; Embassy of China, London
- Appointer: The president pursuant to a National People's Congress Standing Committee decision
- Inaugural holder: Guo Songtao
- Formation: 28 August 1875; 151 years ago
- Website: Chinese Embassy – London

The ambassador of China to the United Kingdom is the official representative from the People's Republic of China to the United Kingdom of Great Britain and Northern Ireland.

Formerly, the Chinese ambassadors represented the Qing Empire (1875–1912) and the Republic of China (1912–1950).

== List of ambassadors ==
- 1875–1878: Guo Songtao
- 1878–1885: Zeng Jize
- 1885–1889: Liu Ruifen
- 1889–1893: Xue Fucheng
- 1893–1896: Kung Chao-Yuan
- 1896–1901: Luo Fenglu
- 1901–1905: Zhang Deyi
- 1905–1907: Wang Daxie
- 1907–1910: Li Jingfang
- 1910–1914: Lew Yuk Lin
- 1914–1920: Alfred Sao-ke Sze
- 1920–1922: Wellington Koo
- 1922–1925: Zhu Zhaoxin
- 1925: Yan Huiqing
- 1926–1929: Wang Jingwei
- 1929–1932: Alfred Sao-ke Sze
- 1932–1941: Guo Taiqi
- 1941–1946: Wellington Koo
- 1946–1950: Cheng Tien-hsi
- 1954–1962: Huan Xiang
- 1962–1967: Xiong Xianghui
- 1967–1969: Shen Ping
- 1969–1970: Ma Jiajun
- 1970–1972: Pei Jianzhang
- 1972–1977: Song Zhiguang
- 1978–1983: Ke Hua
- 1983–1985: Chen Zhaoyuan
- 1985–1987: Hu Dingyi
- 1987–1991: Ji Chaozhu
- 1991–1995: Ma Yuzhen
- 1995–1997: Jiang Enzhu
- 1997–2002: Ma Zhengang
- 2002–2007: Zha Peixin
- 2007–2010: Fu Ying
- 2010–2021: Liu Xiaoming
- 2021–Present: Zheng Zeguang

== See also ==
- List of ambassadors of the United Kingdom to China
- China–United Kingdom relations
