= Xue Fucheng =

Chinese diplomat

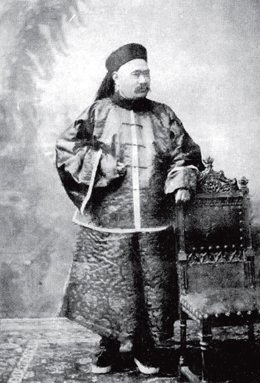

Chinese Ambassador to the UK
- In office ?–?
- Monarch: Guangxu

Chinese Ambassador to France
- In office ?–?
- Monarch: Guangxu

Personal details
- Born: 12 April 1838 Wuxi, Jiangsu, Qing dynasty, China
- Died: 21 July 1894 (aged 56) Shanghai, Jiangsu, Qing dynasty, China

Xue Fucheng
- Chinese: 薛福成
Transcriptions
Standard Mandarin
- Hanyu Pinyin: Xuē Fúchéng
- Wade–Giles: Hsueh Fu-cheng (or Hsieh Fu-cheng)

Shuyun (courtesy name)
- Chinese: 叔耘
Transcriptions
Standard Mandarin
- Hanyu Pinyin: Shūyún

Yong'an (art name)
- Chinese: 庸庵
Transcriptions
Standard Mandarin
- Hanyu Pinyin: Yōng'ān

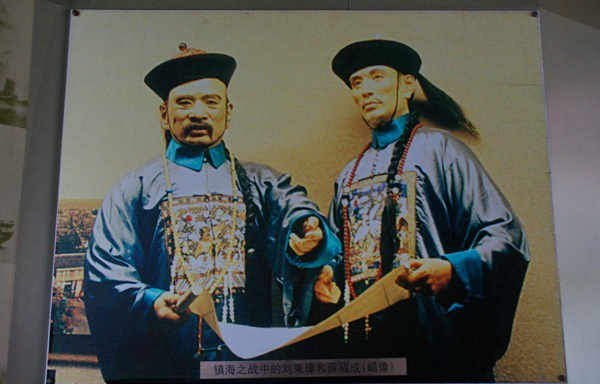
Portrait of Liu Bingzhang (left) and Xue Fucheng (right) during the Zhenhai Campaign

Xue Fucheng or Hsieh Fucheng (12 April 1838 – 21 July 1894) was a Chinese diplomat of the Qing dynasty in the late 19th century. Born in Wuxi, Jiangsu to a literati family. Late Qing dynasty writer/essayist, diplomat to England, France, Belgium, Italy, and one of the leaders and advocate for modernization and adoption of Western technology as well as proponent for the development of capitalist industries in China during the late 19th century. Eschewing the traditional literati pursuits of writing poetry and calligraphy, Xue proposed that the government should promote pragmatism application of new technology and knowledge in strengthening China.

Xue was a prolific writer – his works included: Essays from a Commonplace Hut (庸庵文編), More Essays from a Commonplace Hut (續編), Essays from Across the Ocean (庸庵海外文編), Diplomatic Journal from 4 Countries (出使四國日記), Notes from a Commonplace Hut (庸庵筆記), Preliminary proposals concerning Western Affairs (籌洋芻議), Diplomatic Memorials to the Throne (出使奏疏). His seminal works are included in the Complete Works from the Commonplace Hut (庸庵全集).

During his tenure as the Qing government's ambassador to the United Kingdom, France, Belgium and Italy, he wrote a diary describing his diplomatic activities and his impressions of European countries. Apart from documenting records of historical events such as the Taiping Rebellion, he also wrote essays on local legends, the macabre and the supernatural. As a proponent of introducing Western technology into China, Xue wrote about witnessing new technology such as the telephone while he was abroad.

== Lineage and Life ==
The Xue family had been in Wuxi since the Ming dynasty (1368–1644), the first ancestor moving to Wuxi being a veteran of the Chinese-Annam War (Ming–Hồ War of 1406–1407), and General of the Nanjing Imperial Capital Guards known as “Running Tigers”. Xue's great-grandfather was a scholar that died young. His grandfather passed the local civil service exam but did not achieve higher success. His father Xue Xiang was a notable writer and essayist and after passing the provincial civil service exam, became a teacher in the government academy at Zhenjiang. Xue Xiang's unique prose style was admired and imitated by many. In 1845, Xue Xiang passed the national civil service exam with the title of “Jinshi” or “Advanced Scholar”, and became a professor. Later he was promoted to the post of Anfu County Commissioner in Hunan Province. In Anfu, Xue Xiang organized the local militia that fought and defeated bands of invading Taiping rebels, and also led the militia in defense of two other local counties against the rebels. As a result, he was promoted to be governor of Xunzhou in Guangxi province (home province of the Taiping rebels), but died in 1858 before he was able to take up the new assignment.

Xue Fucheng was the third of six surviving sons and had one older sister. His mother and grandmother were both from the prominent literati Gu (顾) family of Wuxi, of which other notable members include scientist and polymath Y. H. Ku.

Xue Fucheng started school at age 6, his first teacher being his 80 year old plus maternal great uncle Mr. Gu. Later in life, he would write about how he and his siblings studied late into the night under the tutelage and supervision of his mother. In 1858, aged 20, Xue and a younger brother both passed the local civil service exam. During that same year, he and his older brother went to visit their ailing father in Hunan. After Xue Xiang died, the two brothers spent over a year settling their father's affairs and remaining bureaucratic duties. In the spring of 1860, the two brothers hurriedly traveled back to Wuxi when they heard of the Taiping rebels’ invasion of their hometown but was unable to locate their mother and siblings who had fled Wuxi. To their dismay, the brothers found that an uncle, aunt and numerous cousins were killed or committed suicide to avoid capture by the Taiping rebels. The family home was burnt and destroyed. The Taiping rebels took Xue's older brother into custody, but unaware of his true identity as a Qing official's son, released him in due course. Travelling incognito and with great trepidations through Taiping held territory, the brothers crossed the Yangtze River and eventually located their mother and siblings to the north in the town of Baoying near the city of Yangzhou. In this same year of 1860, the British and French Army invaded Beijing and burned down the Summer Palace. The Emperor escaped from the capital but the Qing government was forced to sign another unequal treaty to appease the Western powers. Xue Fucheng remained in Baoying and continued his studies but the crisis in government motivated him to study pragmatic and concrete ways to reform the weak and corrupt Qing government.

In the summer of 1865, the governor-general of Liangjiang, Zeng Guofan, travelled north to put down the Nian Rebel Army. On his way north, he published recruitment notices for talented men to join him. While Zeng's boat was moored at a point near Baoying, Xue Fucheng, aged 27, braved a downpour in a rainstorm to submit his proposals to Zeng on June 28, 1865. The ten thousand words’ “Memorial to Marquis Zeng” detailed eight proposals to reform the government. Zeng was impressed and asked Xue to join his cabinet. For the next 7 years working under Zeng, Xue was exposed to the practical workings of government in both military and civil affairs. Both Zeng and Xue were aficionados of the strategic game of Go, and often started the day with an early morning game.

In 1872, Zeng Guofan died suddenly at age 61. Having lost his mentor, Xue Fucheng took up a new post at Suzhou Publishing House as an editor of the histories of the Liao, Jin and Yuan Dynasties (all foreign dynasties that had invaded and occupied China in the past). He also wrote and published stories about ghosts and the supernatural as well as anecdotes of curious local events and folklores that he had heard or read about in his childhood. These are collected in “Jottings from a Commonplace Hut” and showed a different side of his personality.

In 1875, the new Guangxu Emperor passed down an edict requesting learned men to submit their proposals for improvement to the government. Xue, aged 37, submitted his proposal (with help from Governor Ding Baozhen, employer of his younger brother) – advocating focus on diplomacy and knowledge of international laws in negotiation, establishing civil service exams to test candidates on knowledge of the Western world, sending scholars for further studies abroad, building and developing a modern navy. The court took notice of his recommendations and soon adopted measures to execute his proposals. The court also circulated his proposals as must-read materials for officialdom. He became an overnight sensation in government circles and many high officials proposed that he should be appointed to a diplomatic assignment overseas. The powerful governor of Zhili Province (Beijing is located in Zhili Province), Li Hongzhang, recruited Xue into his cabinet.

In the latter half of 1875, during the domestic crisis caused by the Margary Affair, when British authorities put pressure on the Qing government for the murder of a junior British diplomat, Augustus Margary, during a trip to explore trade routes between British India and China's provinces, Xue Fucheng acted as advisor for Li Hongzhang in his negotiations with Britain. The crisis was resolved in 1876 with the signing of the Chefoo Convention.

In 1879, Manchu Prince Gong, head of the Zongli Yamen, China's equivalent of the Foreign Office, agreed to give over control and defense of China's coast to Robert Hart, then Inspector-General of China's Imperial Maritime Custom Service (IMCS). Xue advised Li Hongzhang on the serious consequences that could ensue if defense of China's coast rested in foreign hands. Following Xue's advice, Li Hongzhang asked Hart to resign his current post as Inspector-General in order to take up the new post, and as anticipated by Xue, Hart chose to retain his more lucrative assignment in the Custom Service.

In 1881, Xue put forward his proposal for a modernized Chinese navy, and Li Hongzhang adopted many of his ideas in the implementation of the Beiyang Navy.

In July 1882, in what was known as the Imo Incident in Joseon Korea, then still a traditional Chinese protectorate, units of the Korean military revolted in Seoul. In part, the flare-up of violence may have been caused by provocative policies and conduct by Japanese military advisors training the new Special Skills Force. Xue advised Li to take quick action to put down the rebellion. The Chinese dispatched Beiyang Naval Units under the command of Ding Ruchang to Joeson to assess the evolving situation. Chinese troops effectively quelled the rebellion. The pro-Japanese Regent Daewongun, accused of fomenting the disturbance and its violence, was arrested by Chinese troops and taken to China where he spent three years in custody and only returned to Korea in 1885. The incident was regarded by the Chinese as a Japanese plot to assert control over Korea. Xue received a promotion because of his advice to take quick action in putting down the rebellion.

In early summer of 1884, Xue was appointed governor of Ningbo and Shaoxing in Zhejiang Province, a strategic coastal area that came under attack by French warships during the Sino French War (1884–1885). His predecessor in the post had died suddenly under mysterious circumstances. Xue had to resolve internal dissensions in strategy between local civil and military authority. Xue ordered the Battle of Zhenhai to be mined, moved cannons to better-camouflaged locations, and ensured that the French could not recruit locals who knew how to navigate the coastal terrain. With his intimate knowledge of treaty terms, he reminded the British on their required neutrality. Consequently, in February 1885, under diplomatic pressure from China, Britain invoked provisions of the Foreign Enlistment Act 1870 and closed Hong Kong and other Far Eastern ports to French warships. In the ensuing conflict, several French warships were sunk in Zhenhai Bay and Admiral Courbet of the French fleet was wounded and died of his injuries soon afterwards.

During his tenure in Ningbo, Xue Fucheng donated his annual salary for the restoration of Tianyi Ge, the oldest existing library in China originally built in the Ming dynasty but which had fallen into disrepair. He undertook the supervisory work of cataloging the antique books in the library.

In fall of 1888, Xue was promoted to Ancha Shi (a position equivalent to an Attorney General) in Hunan Province. However, during a visit to the capital in the spring of 1889, he was reassigned as Imperial Envoy to the United Kingdom, France, Italy and Belgium.

During his tenure in Europe (1890–1894), Xue visited many European countries in order to understand the impact of industrial development and how different European political systems impacted military power, education, law and finance. He came to the conclusion that Europe was significantly in advance of China and China can only modernize by adopting Western technology and systems. The account of his thoughts and experiences in Europe is in his "Diplomatic Journal of Four Countries". While in Europe, he wrote a letter home to his son and stipulated: "all my descendants, whether male or female, should begin their education no later than the age of seven and study Western technology and the English language". Equal education for women was an uncommon stance in China at that time.

While in Europe, Xue engaged in substantive trade negotiations with Britain on the question of the China-Burmese border as well as the establishment of consulates in Southeast Asia to protect the rights of Chinese citizens.

In 1894, Xue completed his diplomatic term and returned to China, arriving in Shanghai on May 28 after a long and exhausting trip. A virulent local epidemic struck him down and he died in Shanghai, aged 56.

== Xue Garden in Wuxi ==
A family mansion built in the late 19th century is now a national historical site open to the public. The mansion has a traditional Chinese courtyard and garden, a library building, an open-air opera stage and a billiards room. The mansion was called "half Wuxi city" because of its size reaches 21,000 square metres. It was constructed between 1890 and 1894. As of today, the remains of the mansion cover 6,000 square metres and has 160 rooms. This mansion was designed by Xue himself before he was sent to Europe, and was built by his eldest son Xue Nanming. The Qing government sent him a plaque with the words "Residence of the Imperial Envoy" (钦使第) to recognise him for his diplomatic achievements. The plaque was hung at the entrance of his mansion.

When Xue built this mansion, his official rank was Positive Third Grade (正三品). According to Qing government rules, a Third Grade official's residence cannot exceed five room doors in width, but Xue's mansion was too wide and violated the rules. Xue then thought of separating the nine rooms wide house by three columns of walls so the building looked like nine houses placed together. This design is unique in China. The Xue mansion also incorporates a lot of western-style features such as western-style sliding doors, coloured glass, and a snooker house imported from Europe. There is a turntable floor building inside which is as wide as 11 rooms in width. The building is called "1st turntable floor in China" for its size.

Xue was the second Qing envoy to Europe. His predecessor also served a few years overseas.

== Gallery ==
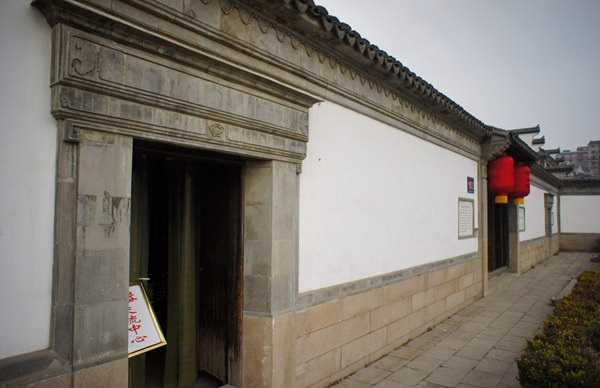
Xuefucheng Old Mansion front gate

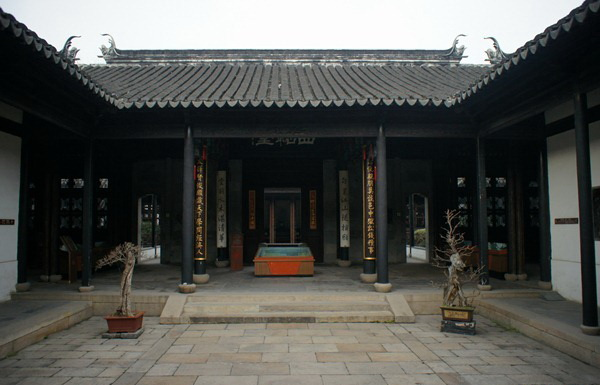
Xuefucheng Old Mansion Xishao hall

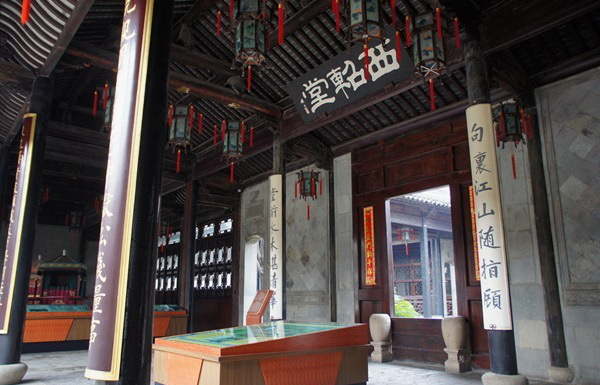
Xuefucheng Old Mansion Xishao hall

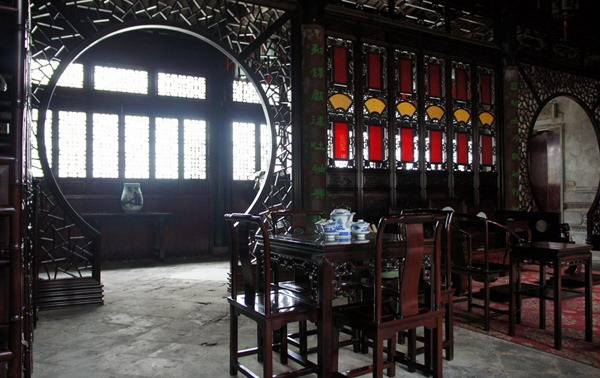
Xuefucheng Old Mansion Xishao hall

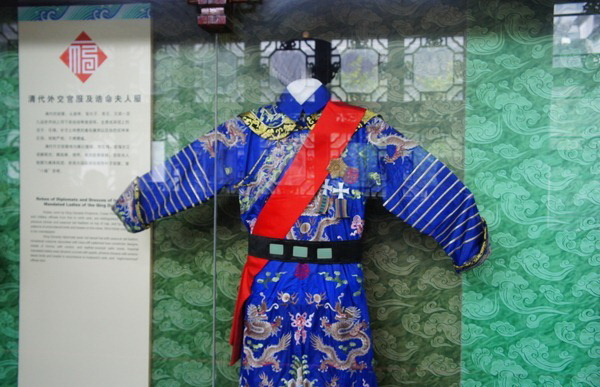
Xuefucheng Old Mansion Xuefucheng's clothes as diplomat

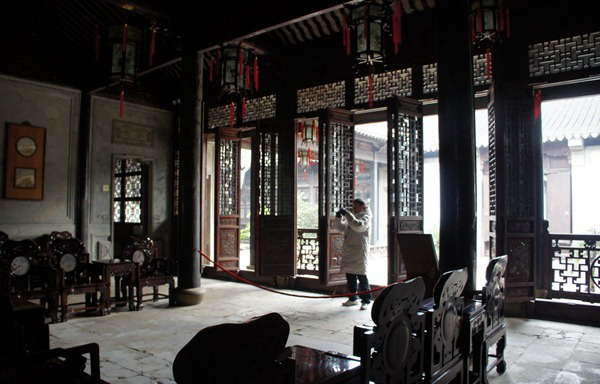
Xuefucheng Old Mansion Yishi Hall (Procedure Hall)

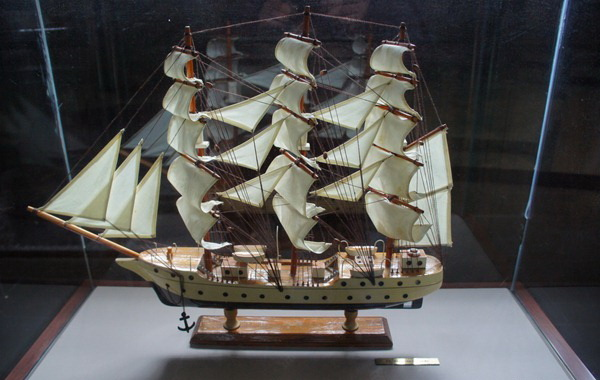
Xuefucheng Old Mansion Model of Xuefucheng's brigantine to Europe

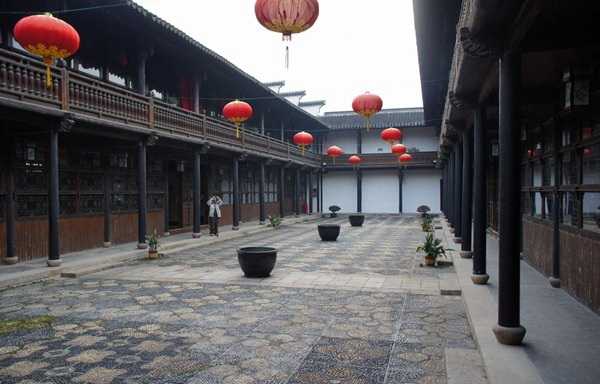
Xuefucheng Old Mansion turntable floor building (转盘楼)

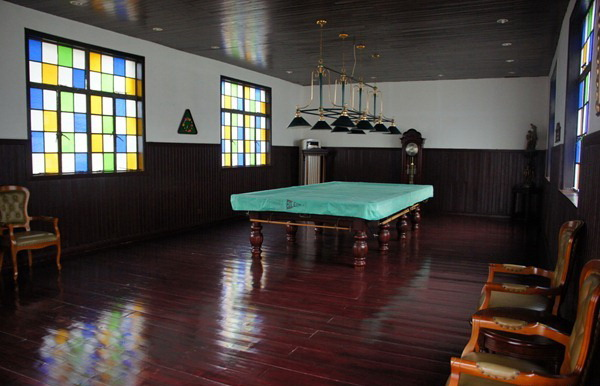
Xuefucheng Old Mansion Snooker table bought from Europe

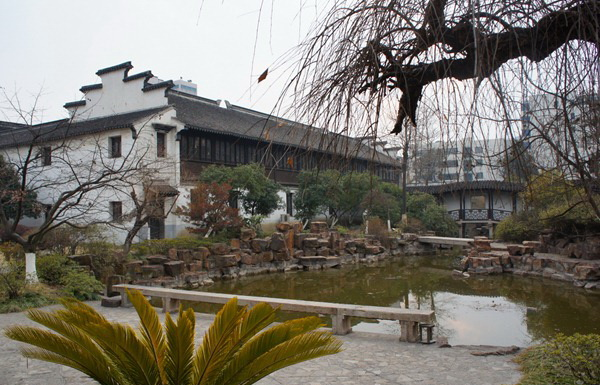
Garden of Xuefucheng Old Mansion
