= Embassy of China, London =

Diplomatic mission of China to the UK

Embassy of the People's Republic of China in the United Kingdom of Great Britain and Northern Ireland; 中华人民共和国驻大不列颠及北爱尔兰联合王国大使馆
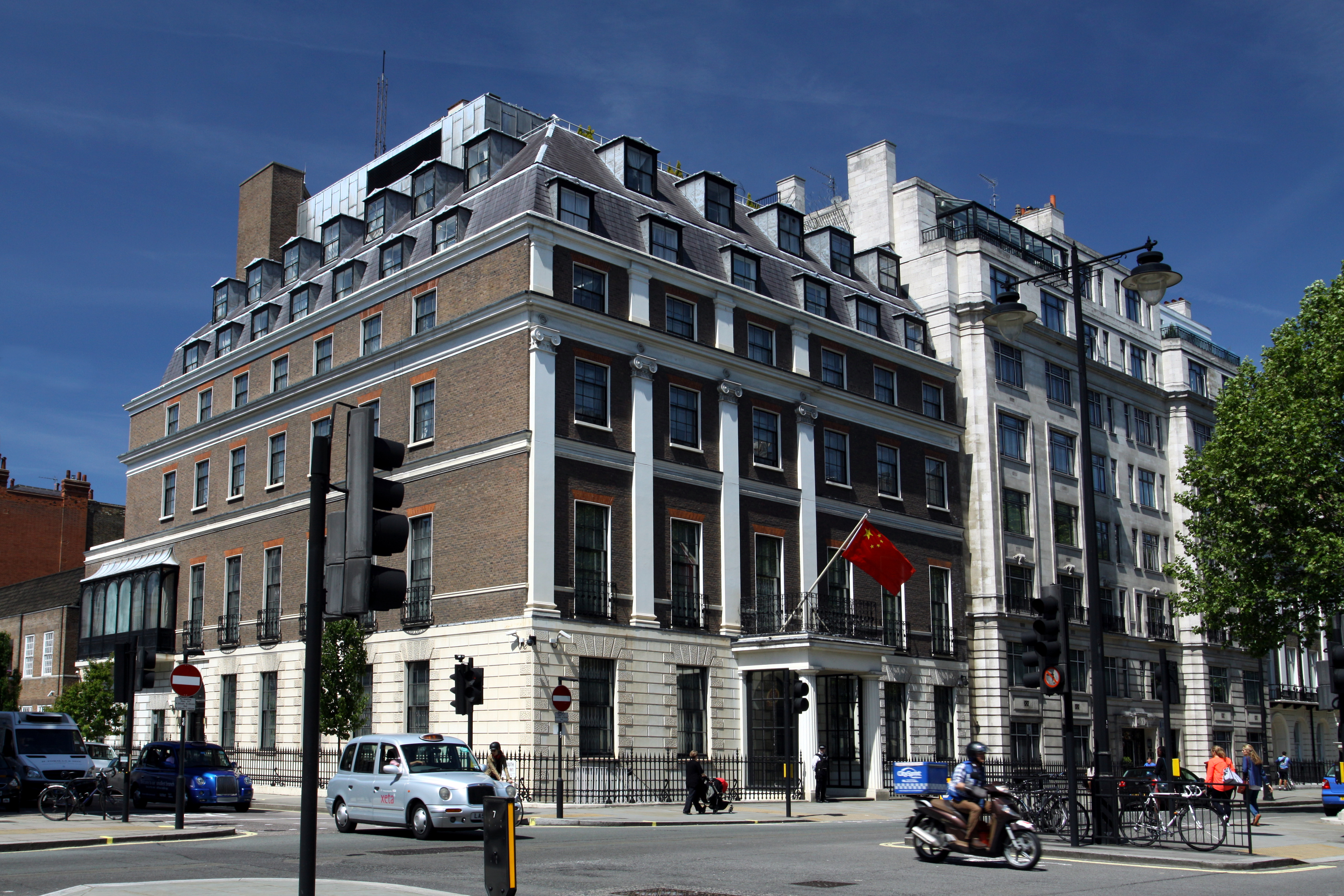
- Location: Marylebone, London
- Address: 49–51 Portland Place, London W1B 1JL
- Coordinates: 51.52102°N 0.14548°W
- Opened: 1877; Current building: 1985; 41 years ago
- Ambassador: Zheng Zeguang
- Website: gb.china-embassy.gov.cn

The Embassy of the People's Republic of China in the United Kingdom of Great Britain and Northern Ireland is the diplomatic mission of China in the United Kingdom, located in London.

Established in 1877 as the Chinese Legation, the London mission was China's first permanent overseas diplomatic mission. It has served as the diplomatic mission of the Manchu Qing Empire, the Republic of China, and (since 1954) the People's Republic of China. It was the location of the Qing Empire's detention of Sun Yat-sen, an important episode in the 1911 Revolution. It remains today the focal point for events relating to China held in the United Kingdom. In 2018 the Chinese government purchased Royal Mint Court with plans to develop the site for a new embassy building. Chinese government plans for a new embassy were approved in 2026.

Liu Xiaoming was the Ambassador of China to the United Kingdom from 2010 to 2021, under Chinese leaders Hu Jintao and Xi Jinping. He retired in January 2021 and was succeeded by Zheng Zeguang.

== History ==
The Chinese Legation in London was established at 49 Portland Place in 1877 by the Qing Empire, becoming China's first permanent overseas diplomatic mission. As part of the settlement of the Margary Affair, the Qing Empire was required to send an Imperial commissioner to London to apologise in person to Queen Victoria. Guo Songtao, Deputy Minister of Arms, was appointed Minister to Britain and Minister to France in 1876 and sent to London. Guo arrived at Southampton on 12 January 1877. In preparation for his arrival, James Duncan Campbell, non-resident secretary of the Chinese Imperial Customs Service and head of its London office, leased 49 Portland Place, and the Chinese Legation was officially established on Guo's arrival in London on 7 February 1877.

Kidnapped in London: Sun Yat-sen publicised his imprisonment in the Chinese Legation for political effect in this widely read pamphlet.

The legation was the location of the detention of Sun Yat-sen, an important episode in the lead-up to the 1911 Revolution. Sun's detention sparked a major diplomatic incident, but he was eventually released with the help of his friend James Cantlie.

After the 1911 revolution, the Republic of China was established on 1 January 1912 and was recognised by the British government as the legitimate government of China on 6 October 1913. The Republic of China government took over the building from the Qing government, and extended the lease on No. 49 in 1924. In 1926, the Chinese government leased the adjoining 51 Portland Place as well, and obtained a 999-year lease on both No. 49 and No. 51. In 1935, the level of Chinese diplomatic representation in Britain was upgraded, and the Chinese Legation became the Chinese Embassy.

After the revolution of 1949, the UK government for a short time continued to recognise the Republic of China as the legitimate government of China, but in 1950 switched recognition to the People's Republic of China, which inherited the buildings in 1954 with the formal establishment of relations; an ambassador was first appointed in 1972. British authorities agreed to a Chinese request to demolish the buildings and rebuild them as a single building with a sympathetic façade in 1973. The buildings were demolished in 1980, rebuilding took place between 1983 and 1985. The new building, while sympathetic to the original, retains only one doorway in place of the two doorways of the two houses it replaced.

The embassy has in recent years been the site of protests against actions of the Chinese government, including protests against the imprisonment of artist Ai Weiwei, and in favour of Tibetan independence. There has been a Falun Gong protester sitting opposite the embassy for many years; this is referenced in the novel Saturday by Ian McEwan. On 3 June 2014, members of staff at the Chinese embassy in London reacted angrily when people arrived to lay flowers to mark the 25th anniversary of the 1989 Tiananmen Square protests and massacre. Wang Ti-Anna, the daughter of an imprisoned democracy activist and another women were shoved, their flowers thrown away, and they were shouted at by a member of staff, before calm returned to the scene. In London regular protests against the persecution of Uyghurs in China outside an outpost of the Chinese embassy have been organized by an Orthodox Jewish man from the local neighborhood. He has held protests at least twice a week since February 2019.

== Services ==
Most applications by UK citizens for visas to China are not handled by the embassy, however, but are instead processed by the China Visa Applications Centre, also located in London. There is a constant police presence outside the embassy. China also maintains several other buildings in London: an Education Section at 50 Portland Place, a Defence Section at 25 Lyndhurst Road, Hampstead, a Commercial Section at 16 Lancaster Gate, Paddington, a Cultural Section at 11 West Heath Road, Hampstead and a Science & Technology Section at 10 Greville Place, Maida Vale. In addition, there are Chinese consulates-general in Manchester, Edinburgh and Belfast.

== Proposed new embassy ==
Despite rumours in 2013 that the embassy was to move from Portland Place to a new development in Nine Elms, in 2018 the Chinese government purchased Royal Mint Court with plans to develop the site for a new embassy building.

In 2022, the Tower Hamlets council voted unanimously to reject plans for a new Chinese embassy which would have been on the site of Royal Mint Court. In August 2024, Angela Rayner delayed approval of the new embassy after the US and others raised concerns about rooms redacted from blueprints. In October 2024, Angela Rayner 'called in' the planning application to allow for ministers to decide whether the plans for the new consulate could go ahead. The Chinese government refused to provide the UK with full blueprints of the proposed embassy, saying that requests for information about redacted areas were "inappropriate."

On 20 January 2026, the new embassy was approved. Security Minister Dan Jarvis said he was "content any risks are being appropriately managed". It was confirmed Housing Secretary Steve Reed had given permission for the development to proceed. The decision was met with criticism from opposition parties including the Conservative Party, the Liberal Democrats and Reform UK. The Royal Mint Court Residents' Association appealed against the approval, and in April 2026 the High Court granted the RMCRA the right for a judicial review. The review was rejected in July 2026, but the RMCRA immediately said it would appeal.

== Gallery ==
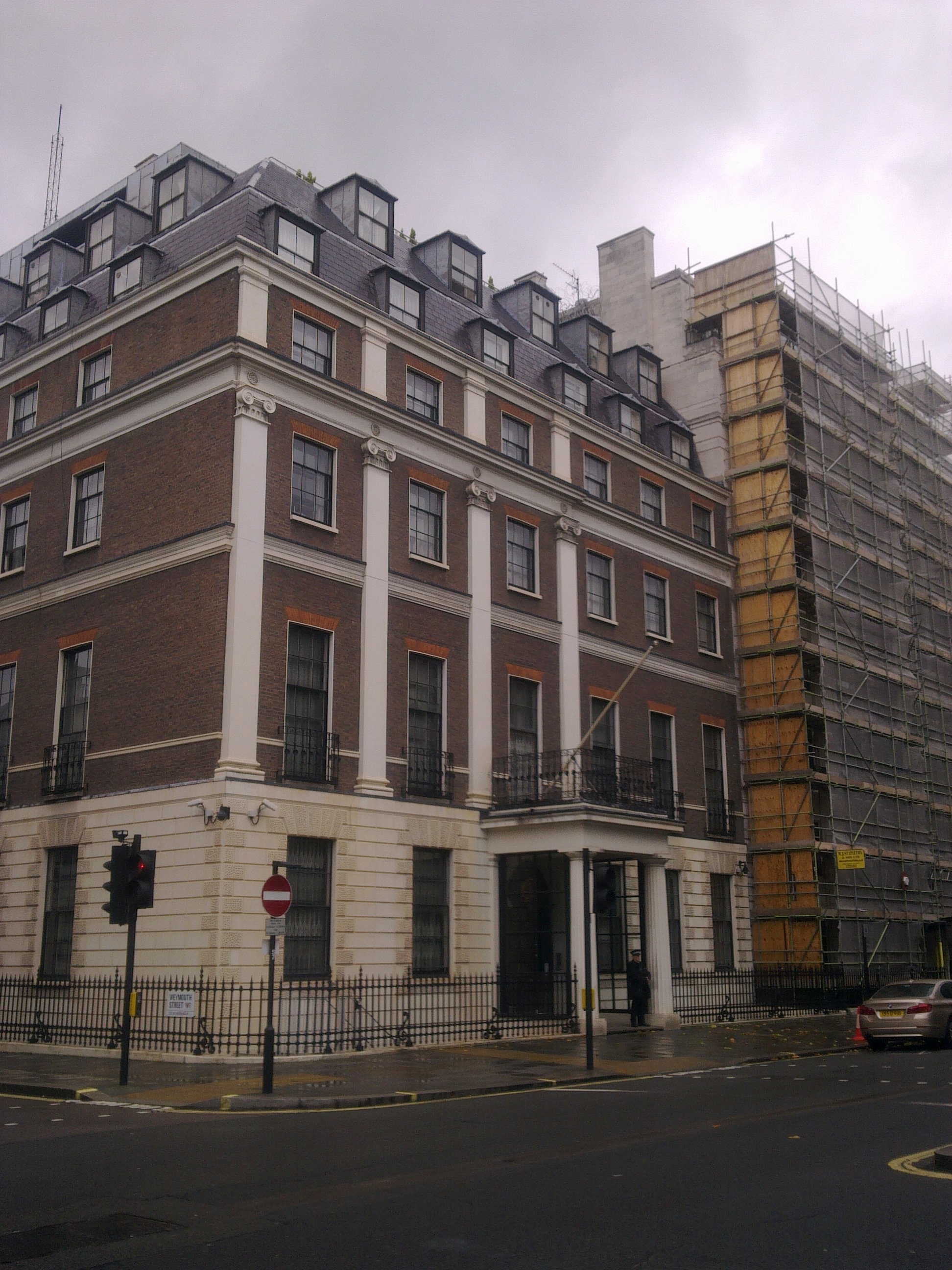
The embassy building today. While the façades of the two houses that stood on this site, with slightly different designs, can still be distinguished, the two doorways were replaced with one during the 1970s rebuilding.

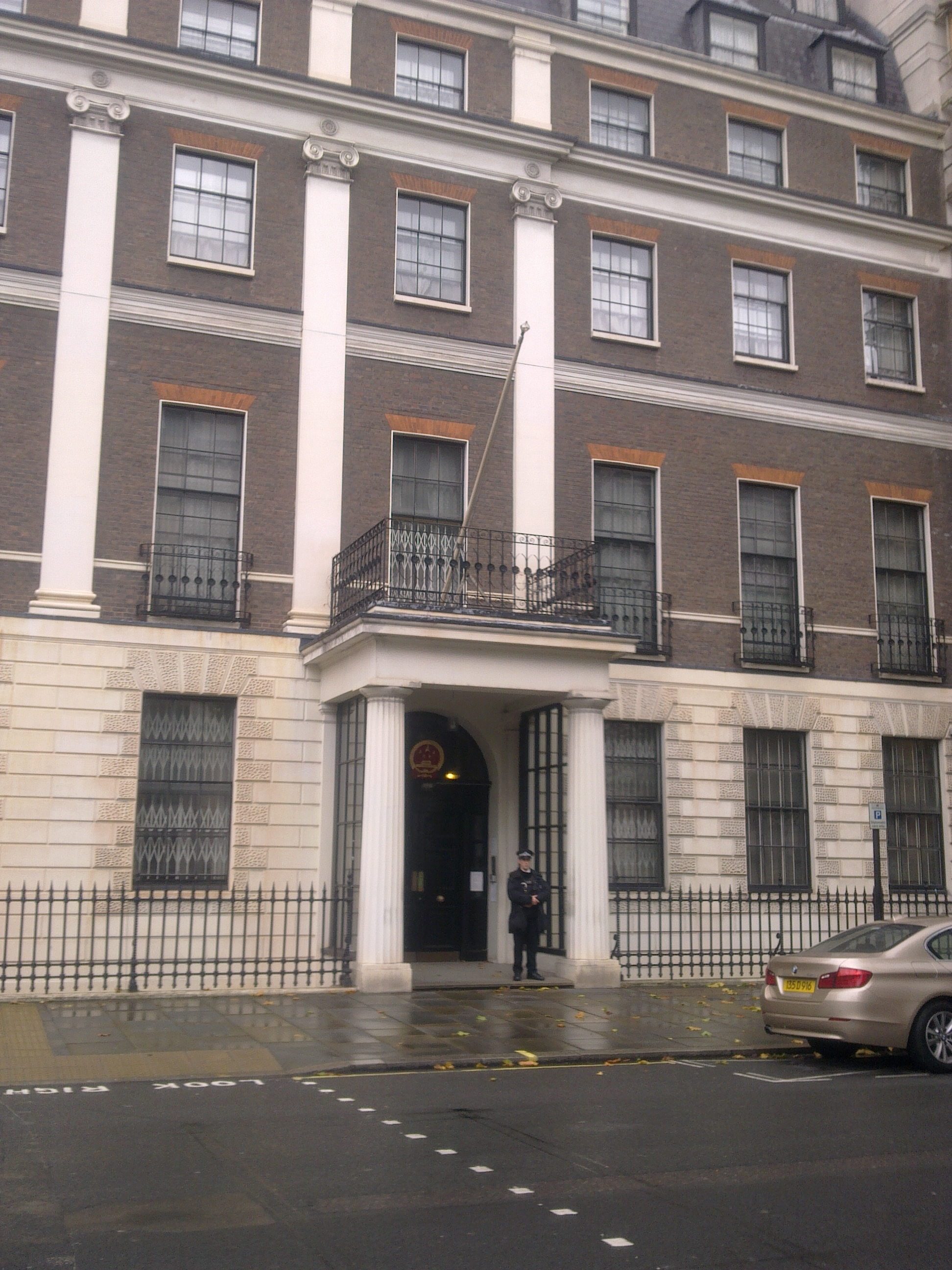
A policeman outside the embassy; the National Emblem of China can be seen above the door

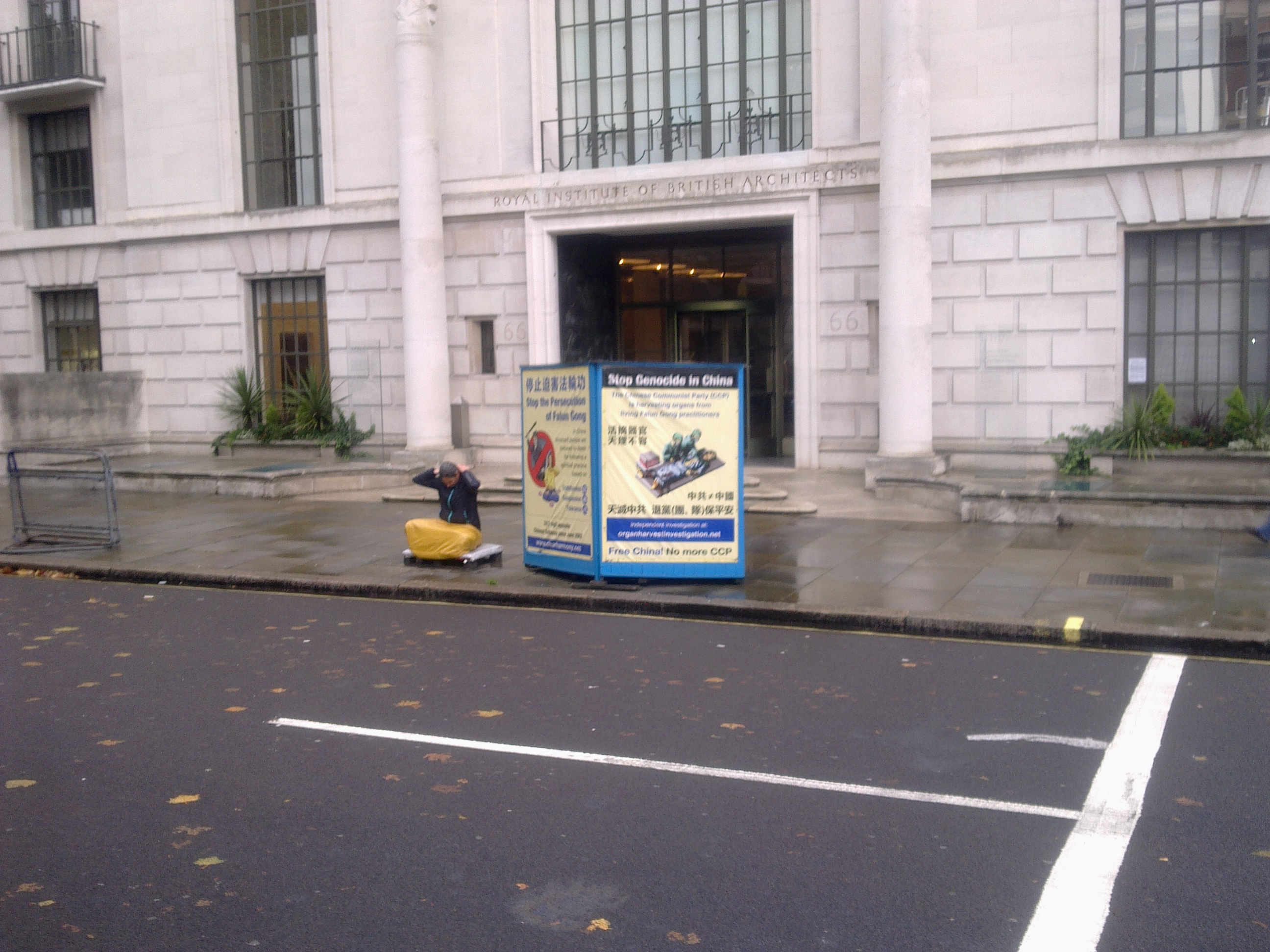
A Falun Gong protester in 2013

== See also ==
- List of diplomatic missions of China
  - Consulate General of China, Manchester
- Taipei Representative Office in the U.K.
- Embassy of the United Kingdom, Beijing
