= Luo Fenglu =

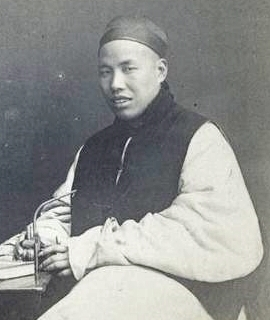
Luo Fenglu c. 1884

Luo Fenglu (Chinese: 羅豊禄; pinyin: Luó Fēnglù; Wade–Giles: Lo Fêng-lu; 1850–1901), also written as Lo Feung Lo or Lofênghlu, was a diplomat of the late Qing dynasty who represented his country as minister in the United Kingdom (1897–1901).

== Biography ==
He joined the Fujian Arsenal Academy in 1867. Being its top student, he was sent to study in Europe, arriving at King's College London in May 1877. During his stay in London, he also worked as translator for the embassies in the United Kingdom and Germany, also serving as Naval Secretary to Li Hongzhang from 1880 to circa 1882.

Luo Fenglu was a member of several Western chivalric orders, including the Order of the Crown, the Order of Orange-Nassau, Royal Victorian Order, the Order of Leopold, and the Order of Saint Stanislaus.

His wife, known in the United Kingdom as Lady Lo, died at the Chinese legation in London on 10 February 1899. Among their children were Lo Tsung-hien and Lo Tsung-yee, who was also a diplomat.
