= Chai Zemin =

Chinese diplomat

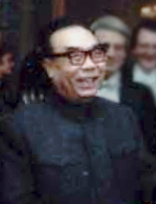
Chai Zemin

Chai Zemin (Chinese: 柴泽民; pinyin: Chái Zémín; Wade–Giles: Ch’ai Tsê-min; October 1916 – June 7, 2010) was a Chinese diplomat, and the first ambassador of the People's Republic of China to the United States after the normalization of the Sino-US relationship in 1979.

== Early life ==
Chai Zemin was born in October 1916 in an ordinary family in Wenxi, Shanxi. After he graduated from high school, he became politically active and joined the Chinese Communist Party.

Chai's career as a diplomat started in December 1960 when he entered the Ministry of Foreign Affairs of China. He was appointed China's ambassador to Hungary in 1961, to Guinea in 1964, and to Egypt in 1970.

In 1975, China and Thailand established diplomatic relations, and Chai became the first China's ambassador to Thailand. During his two-and-half-year term in Thailand, he experienced two general elections, three coups d'état, four different prime ministers and five different governments in the country. It had been a great challenge for him to work in such a turbulent environment, and the King of Thailand awarded him a White Elephant Medal for his diplomatic achievement.

In the summer of 1978, China and the United States started negotiations on normalizing relations between the two countries, and Chai Zemin took the position of director in the People's Republic of China Liaison Office (PRCLO) in Washington, D.C., and participated in the negotiations. It was agreed at the end of 1978 that China and the United States would officially establish relations on January 1, 1979, and set up embassies and appoint ambassadors to each other's country. Chai thus became the first China's ambassador to the United States thirty years after the founding of the People's Republic of China.

In the fall of 1981, Michigan State University conferred an honorary degree of Doctor of Laws on Chai for his contributions to China–US relations.

In 1983, Chai Zeming left his ambassador position and assumed the title of vice director of the Chinese Foreign Affairs Society, and had since been a member of the Chinese People's Political Consultative Conference for three terms.

In the early 1990s, Chai resigned his position at the Chinese Foreign Affairs Society, and afterwards, he became director and consultant of a number of other societies and organizations.

Diplomatic posts
Preceded by new office	China's Ambassador to Thailand; January 1976-May 1978	Succeeded by Zhang Weilie
Preceded by (No ambassador 1949–1979)	Chinese Ambassador to the United States; March 1979 – December 1982	Succeeded by Zhang Wenjin
