= Rebel Pepper =

Chinese political cartoonist

Wang Liming
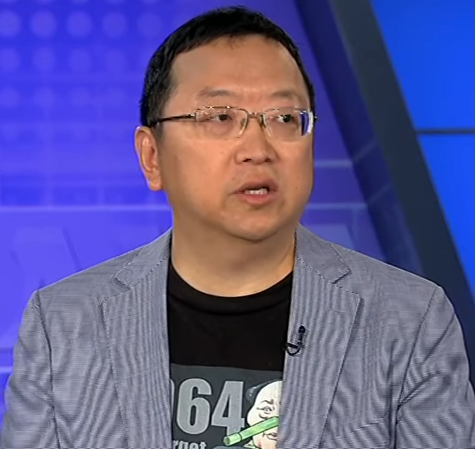
- Born: 1973 (age 52–53) Shihezi, Xinjiang, China
- Area: Political Satire
- Pseudonym: Rebel Pepper
- Notable works: A Shrinking Apple
- Children: 1

Wang Liming (Chinese: 王立铭; pinyin: Wáng Lìmíng; born 1973), also known as Remon Wang, better known under the pseudonym Rebel Pepper (Chinese: 变态辣椒; pinyin: Biàntài Làjiāo, lit. "Abnormal Chili pepper"), is a Chinese political cartoonist in exile in the United States. Wang left China out of fears for his safety resulting from the increasing crackdown on freedom of expression by the Chinese Communist Party (CCP). Since 2017, he has been working in the United States at Radio Free Asia as a political cartoonist.

== Early life ==
Wang was born in Xinjiang Uyghur Autonomous Region in China in 1973. He attended a vocational school in Tangshan, Hebei. Before leaving China, he lived in Shanghai and Beijing for a long time. He was also an agent for imported food.

== Censored in China ==
Since 2006, he published on comics on current affairs in Mop.com, which caused widespread concern. In October 2013, he was subpoenaed by the Chinese domestic security bureau for "suspicion of provoking quarrels" after allegedly reposting a rumor. Before leaving mainland China, Wang Liming lived in Tangshan, Shanghai, and Beijing.

By March 2012, Liming reported that his user account on Sina Weibo had been deleted over 180 times. In July 2014, his microblog accounts were deleted from the sites of two major Chinese media companies, Sina and Tencent – from which he'd been reaching close to 1 million followers. His page on the wiki-based Baidu Baike was also removed, along with his store on the e-commerce platform Taobao. After losing his sources of income, he has made a public appeal for financial help.

On 2014, Wang moved to in Japan, where he continued to publish satirical cartoons. People's Daily, the official newspaper of the Central Committee of the Chinese Communist Party, has accused Wang of being a "Japan-worshipping traitor" and called for his arrest. Because he could be taken away by the police for questioning in Beijing, Wang was worried that his safety would be threatened after returning home, so he applied to the Japanese Immigration Bureau to extend his stay in Japan. Wang announced that he would stay in Japan and would not return to Mainland China. He continued to stay in Japan and worked concurrently as a researcher at Saitama University. In May 2017, Wang obtained an EB-2 visa, which was issued by the United States and was able to immigrate to the United States. He currently resides in Fairfax, Virginia.

== Style and approach ==
Wang start drawing political cartoons in 2009, and originally coined the name 'Perverse Pepper' (biantai lajiao) for himself – later modifying it for English usage at the suggestion of a Taiwanese friend. He frequently draws himself into his cartoons, as 'the Pepper', described by one journalist as a "sometimes sad, sometimes oblivious, sometimes lascivious chili, with large, intense eyes".

== Activism ==
Flag of the Shanghai National Party (founded by Wang) and the proposed independent city-state of Shanghai. The flag is based on the flag of the Shanghai International Settlement consisting of a red saltire but with its seal replaced with a blue circle.

In 2012, Liming depicted the Communist Party as an anglerfish hypnotizing smaller fish (the Chinese people) with the image of Lei Feng, a famous soldier in the People's Liberation Army. He has satirized CCP general secretary Xi Jinping, depicting Xi as a steamed dumpling surrounded by other breakfast foods 'kowtowing' to him as an old-time emperor; and as a shirtless post-coital smoker in bed with a young man. Wang depicted former CCP Chairman Mao Zedong boasting of his 'victim count' to leaders of Islamic State.

His work often appears in China Digital Times and its related publications. In February 2016, he created artwork in support of persecuted lawyer Zhang Kai, who had worked with Christians to fight the government's removal of crucifixes from churches in Wenzhou.

Wang is the sole contributor of Radio Free Asia's cartoon column.

In July 2018, Wang announced the establishment of the Shanghai National Party in New York, advocating for Shanghai independence. He tweeted the ultimate goal of the Shanghai independence movement was to destroy the concept of a unified China. He wrote: "We must not only fight against the Communist Party, but also win more Chinese people to abandon the shell of "China."

== See also ==
- Censorship in China
- Human Rights in China
- Zunzi
- Ali Farzat
