= Zhenping =

Zhenping may refer to the following places in China:

- Zhenping County, Henan (镇平县)
- Zhenping County, Shaanxi (镇坪县)
- Zhenping Road station (镇坪路站), of the Shanghai Metro
- Jiaoling County, formerly Zhenping County, Guangdong
