= 2008 Chinese boycott of Carrefour =

2008 protest in China

The scene of the boycott at the Dalian Victory Plaza store on 20 April 2008.

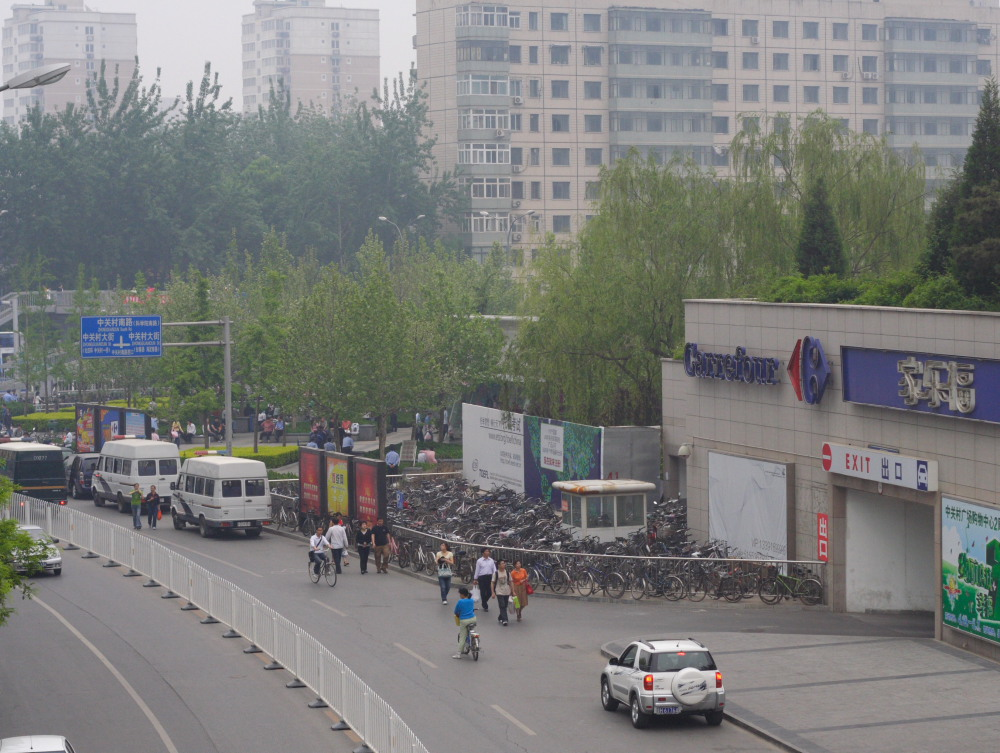
The scene of the boycott at the Carrefour Beijing Zhongguancun Plaza store on the afternoon of 1 May 2008.

A boycott of Carrefour was initiated by some Chinese netizens in April 2008. The theme was to boycott the French chain Carrefour supermarket, oppose Tibetan independence, and support the Beijing Olympics. However, the wave of public boycott was not affirmed by the Chinese government. In addition to criticizing the irrationality, the state media intervened and the incident was mediated by the government. Carrefour also quickly announced its support for the Beijing Olympics, and sales gradually recovered. The boycott ended during the May Day Golden Week.

== Background ==
The history of China's boycott of foreign goods is long, dating back to 1905.

In March 2008, the Tibetan unrest attracted strong attention from European media. Chinese media, officials, and a considerable number of Chinese citizens believed that related reports outside of China were biased towards criticizing China. Soon after, French president Nicolas Sarkozy said he would not rule out boycotting the 2008 Summer Olympics opening ceremony. On 16 April 2008, Paris Mayor Bertrand Delanoë said he would propose to the Council of Paris on 21 April to grant the 14th Dalai Lama the title of honorary citizen.

On 7 April 2008, when the torch of the Beijing Olympic Games was being relayed in Paris, it encountered a large number of protesters. Some protesters tried to snatch the torch, including from Jin Jing, a former disabled athlete from China, who was violently snatched. The French organizers did not protect the torchbearer well. The torch was extinguished several times during the relay, and the torchbearer was able to complete the relay by taking a bus.

== The boycott ==
The Paris torch relay protests angered many Chinese people, who generally believed that France should bear the responsibility for the escalation of the incident. On 10 April 2008, a 26-year-old netizen named "Shuiying" posted a post titled "Boycott French goods, starting with Carrefour" on Mop.com. Discussions began on the internet about whether to boycott French goods, with Carrefour becoming the main topic. Some Chinese media reported that LVMH had funded Tibetan independence. However, the Southern Metropolis Daily pointed out in its report on the anti-boycott activities that the boycotters were only citing netizens' statements, and no major domestic or foreign media had reported on it. The newspaper's reporters also found no reports related to the LV Group and the Dalai Lama when using English and French search engines. Some people opposed the boycott, but most netizens chose to support the boycott.

=== Escalation ===
On 13 April 2008, some media outlets began reporting that Chinese netizens were calling for a boycott of Carrefour. Subsequently, the message calling on the general public to support the boycott spread rapidly through the Internet and mobile phone text messages, attracting attention from the outside world. On 15 April 2008, Chinese Foreign Ministry spokesperson Jiang Yu said, "Recently, some Chinese people have expressed their own opinions and emotions. These are all for a reason, and the French side should think about and reflect on them carefully. I believe that these Chinese people will express their reasonable demands in accordance with the law." On 16 April 2008, French ambassador to China Hervé Ladsous said that "The boycott will not have any results. The economic relationship between China and France is growing rapidly, which is beneficial to both sides. This boycott is contrary to common sense."

On 17 April 2008, photos of the Chinese flag in front of the Carrefour store in Hongshan Square, Wuhan, being lowered to half-mast circulated online, which intensified the boycott. On the same day, there were reports that primary school students in Hefei participated in the boycott of Carrefour, writing slogans and shouting slogans on the spot. In Kunming, Ma Ruibin and three others advocated against boycotting Carrefour at the entrance of the Carrefour store on Nanping Street, but some onlookers threw mineral water bottles at them, and some people denounced them as "traitors and sellouts".

On 18 April 2008, thousands of college students from Hefei came to the Carrefour Changjiang West Road store in the International Shopping Plaza, waving the national flag and singing the national anthem. The store was forced to close early. Although Carrefour's major shareholder, Louis Vuitton, had declared that it "never supports any organization or behavior that is contrary to the interests of the Chinese government and the Chinese people", boycotts and protests continued to spread across the country. In the following two days, Carrefour stores in Beijing, Wuhan, Qingdao, Hefei, Harbin, Xi'an, Jinan, Tianjin and other places encountered demonstrations, with some demonstrators shouting "Down with traitors" at the store employees.

=== Chinese government intervention ===
Shortly after the boycott broke out, the Chinese government called on the public through Xinhua News Agency to calm down and turn their anger into strength to invest in the country's economic development. Xinhua News Agency and People's Daily successively published commentary articles entitled "Patriotic Enthusiasm Must Be Put into the Track of Rationality", "Turning Patriotic Feelings into the Will to Serve the Country", and "How Can Patriotism Be More Powerful?" China Times reported that, fearing that nationalist sentiment would become uncontrollable, Hu Jintao, General Secretary of the Chinese Communist Party, and Zhou Yongkang, Secretary of the Central Political and Legal Affairs Commission, had ordered a ban on students participating in demonstrations.

On 22 April 2008, the Chinese government finally intervened in the incident, praising Carrefour's business practices in China and expressing gratitude for its support of the Beijing Olympics. This was the first time the Chinese government had directly commented on the matter.

On 26 April 2008, the term "Carrefour" was temporarily blocked by search service providers in mainland China such as Baidu, Google China, and Yahoo China. After the incident, the keyword "Carrefour" returned to these search engines in China.

Reports indicate that no further large-scale demonstrations against Carrefour occurred from 21 April 2008 until the Labor Day holiday.

=== May Day holiday ===
As some netizens on the Internet called for a large-scale boycott and demonstration on 1 May, International Workers' Day, the situation during the May Day period was particularly noteworthy. Before May Day, some QQ groups that organized May Day protests issued notices saying that the protests were delayed or even canceled; in addition, sources from various parties pointed out that the Chinese government issued a notice requiring strict management of students during the May Day period, and many universities canceled the May Day holiday to prevent students from participating in the protests.

In fact, on 1 May, protests only took place in front of some Carrefour stores in a few cities, including Changsha, Fuzhou, Xiamen, Shenyang, Chongqing and Beijing, with only a few hundred people participating. At the Carrefour supermarket in Beijing closest to the university district, a large number of uniformed or plainclothes police officers prevented most of the demonstrators from participating; in the morning, the police also detained some demonstrators whose T-shirts were printed with slogans condemning Tibetan independence and Western media, and made them take off their T-shirts. The business of these Carrefour stores was affected to some extent. A Carrefour employee in Changsha told Agence France-Presse that there were very few customers in the store that day; while a Carrefour employee in Beijing said that business was slightly less than expected for the holiday, but still busier than usual. According to Hong Kong electronic media reports, seven men and two women were detained by the police during the demonstrations in Beijing.

Some analysts believe that although there were demonstrations against Carrefour during the May Day holiday, the scale was smaller, indicating that the government's cooling measures were effective.

== Reactions ==
=== France ===
After the incident, France attempted to ease tensions and repair China–France relations. In addition to the original plan for the visit of the president of the French Senate Christian Poncelet, the French president Nicolas Sarkozy also sent former prime minister Jean-Pierre Raffarin and two special envoys to China to handle the incident. During his visit to China, President Poncelet also gave Jin Jing a letter of condolences from President Sarkozy. In addition, French presidential advisors and other officials also arrived in China. At the same time, the Council of Paris voted on the 21 May 2008 to grant the 14th Dalai Lama, the spiritual leader of Tibet, the title of honorary citizen. Hu Jia, a domestic human rights activist, was also granted the title at the same time. Agence France-Presse commented that this move would undoubtedly further strain Sino–French relations.

=== Hong Kong ===
Hong Kong media outlets have extensively reported on the boycott wave in mainland China, and their views on such demonstrations in mainland China vary. Some media outlets are concerned about the rampant nationalism, but they also analyze that the chances of the wave expanding are not high. Some people also believe that the anti-French demonstrations were tacitly approved and manipulated by the Chinese government, and that the demonstrations were a card played by the Chinese government. The authorities' cooling measures are out of concern that if the demonstrations continue or expand, they will be involved in domestic issues.

=== Taiwan ===
In Taiwan, neither the ruling nor opposition parties made any major comments on the incident, and dozens of Carrefour branches across Taiwan operated normally; there were also no activities from any sector of Taiwanese society to respond to this incident in mainland China. The Liberty Times and the United Daily News expressed their doubts or disagreement with the rise of Chinese nationalism in articles such as "Nationalism is on the rise and the Chinese government is dragging its people into playing with fire", "The CCP’s manipulation of nationalism will cause a major blow to China’s economy" and "Beware of the spread of Chinese nationalism".

== See also ==
- 2021 Xinjiang cotton boycott
