= Forced abortion of Feng Jianmei =

Forced third-trimester abortion by Chinese authorities

Feng Jianmei in 2012

On June 2, 2012, Feng Jianmei (Chinese: 冯建梅; pinyin: Féng Jiànméi) was forced to have an abortion in Zhenping County, Shaanxi, China, when she was seven months pregnant with her second child. Local officials had demanded that she and her husband pay a 40,000 yuan fine for violating the nation's one-child policy. When they were unable to do so, authorities arrested Feng, made her sign an agreement to have an abortion, and held her down while injecting her with an abortifacient. She was reportedly traumatized by the incident and in poor health afterwards.

On June 11, Feng's family posted graphic pictures of her stillborn child. The images soon became a viral phenomenon, sparking controversy within China and drawing international attention to the issue of forced abortions. In response to national and international attention, the Chinese government launched an investigation. On June 26, the investigation determined that Feng was not legally entitled to a second child, but that her rights had nonetheless been violated by the local family planning bureau, and as a result, two officials were fired and five others punished. On June 27, the National Population and Family Planning Commission announced it would send inspection teams across China to review the practices of local family planning divisions. Feng's husband, Deng Jiyuan (Chinese: 邓吉元; pinyin: Dèng Jíyuán), hired a lawyer to pursue criminal charges, but ultimately the family decided to settle out of court.

The incident led to increased scrutiny of China's one-child policy, both nationally and internationally. Feng's case has been cited in editorials critical of the one-child policy, and has also been used as an example of how the Internet is empowering ordinary people in an environment of government censorship. On July 5, European Parliament passed a resolution condemning both Feng's case and forced abortion in general. On January 1, 2016, after months of discussion, China's one-child policy was replaced with a two-child policy.

== Background ==
=== One-child law ===
Since 1979, Chinese couples have been limited to one child by law in order to control the country's population. Families living in rural areas, as well as those with an ethnic minority background, can often receive an exemption from the law and have a second child without penalty. Otherwise, couples who have two or more children are required to pay a fine to the government. According to He Yafu, an independent demographer, such fines are common and "have become a major source of profit for family planning authorities" in recent years. He adds that the fines allow wealthy families to have extra children while forcing poorer families into involuntary abortions. The fines generate an estimated 20 billion yuan per year in revenue for the government. He estimates that over 2 trillion yuan (~US$314 billion) has been collected since 1980.

China's Population and Family Planning Law prohibits infringement on people's personal rights and property for family planning purposes. Moreover, a 2001 law prohibited abortions after the sixth month of pregnancy. Nevertheless, human rights groups and critics of the one-child policy say that these laws are inconsistently enforced, and the local officials in many areas still carry out forced sterilizations and/or coerced abortions, sometimes in the third trimester after the fetus has reached viability. In ten Chinese provinces, including Shaanxi, authorities are permitted to take "remedial measures" to ensure that birth quotas are not exceeded. In eight other provinces, authorities are required to terminate unauthorized pregnancies. Activists such as Chen Guangcheng have been jailed by the Chinese government for bringing to light evidence of forced abortions. In 2005, Chen filed a class-action lawsuit on behalf of women forced into sterilization or abortions and subsequently spent seven years in jail or under house arrest before emigrating to the United States in 2012.

=== Feng Jianmei ===
In October 2011, Feng Jianmei, who was a 22-year-old woman from the small village of Yuping in Zeng Jia Township, Shaanxi province, became pregnant with her second child. She had married in 2006 and given birth to a girl in 2007. After listening to the advice of relatives, Feng and her husband, Deng Jiyuan, had believed they would be allowed to have a second child since they had waited five years between children and lived in a rural area. According to Zhenping County officials, authorities had contacted Feng in March 2012 and told her that she needed to obtain documentation, including a new household registration (referred to as hukou), in order to file an application to have the child. Her family denies this, saying that officials did not notify them until several days before the abortion was induced.

== Abortion ==
Around May 28, local family planning officials phoned Feng to try to persuade her to have an abortion. The attempt was unsuccessful, so on May 30 they visited the family house while Feng's husband was away at work. At first, authorities tried to persuade her to voluntarily have an abortion. After several hours, she told the officials she was going out to buy food, and left them in her living room. Instead, she went to an aunt's house, but around 15 officials followed her. They did not immediately arrest Feng, instead setting up shifts to keep watch over her at the aunt's house. Early the next morning, Feng escaped, causing the guards to panic. She flagged down a van and persuaded the driver to help her. The driver let her out down the road, and Feng hid in hillside brush for the next 14 hours, waiting for the cover of darkness in the cold and rainy weather. When night came, she went to a relative's house in the countryside, where she hid under the bed. Authorities from the family planning office found her regardless, and allegedly assaulted her. They let her get a night's sleep before taking her to the hospital on June 2. Several witnesses reported that four men carried Feng out of the house with a pillowcase over her head.

Simultaneously, family planning officials were in communication with Feng's husband, Deng Jiyuan. On June 1, they demanded that Deng either transfer his wife's residency status on the next day or pay 100,000 yuan (US$15,700) to the birth-planning social security fund. Transferring the residency status in one day was impossible, but Deng negotiated the payment down to 30,000 yuan before returning to Zhenping County (he actually only had 18,000 yuan that he had borrowed from work, but hoped an IOU would cover the balance). On his way back, Deng received a text message that demanded that he immediately pay the fee, which was now 40,000 yuan, and "not a penny less". Other family members received similar text messages.

A censored image of Feng, posted on Sina Weibo by her family

At the hospital, two men forced Feng to apply her thumbprint to a consent form and sign a document authorizing the abortion. She was taken into an operating room and restrained by two men as she was injected with a poison to kill the fetus. Feng later told All Girls Allowed, an American group campaigning against the one-child policy, "I could feel the baby jumping around inside me all the time, but then she went still." She had been seven months pregnant at the time, so the abortion, voluntary or not, was illegal under Chinese law. No family members were allowed to be present for the procedure. After the child died of hypoxia, Feng underwent induced labor and delivered a stillborn girl on June 4. Feng later told All Girls Allowed: "It was much more painful than my first childbirth. The baby was lifeless, and she was all purple and blue." The corpse was then placed next to Feng on her bed for her family to dispose of when they arrived.

Feng was traumatized by the procedure and smashed the door and cabinetry of a nurse's office in a fit of rage. A week later, Deng told The South China Morning Post, "My wife is not well. She is sad and distressed. Sometimes she becomes emotional and confused." Feng reportedly had a severe headache for several weeks after the abortion and attempted suicide multiple times. On June 15, an uncle told reporters Feng was in poor health and unable to eat. On June 26, Feng was still in the hospital and suffering from headaches. She told reporters that she wanted to go home, but that hospital staff would not allow her to leave. On June 29, her family reported that Feng would be released the next day. However, her condition worsened, and she did not return home until July 10.

Deng filed an official complaint with Ankang's petition office. A deputy mayor allegedly told Deng that they would investigate, but when nothing appeared to be happening, Deng posted his family's story online. later telling CNN that "I'm angry and want justice." Meanwhile, the township officials had prepared a statement that said Feng was of sound mind and body when she signed the consent form authorizing the abortion.

== Aftermath ==
=== Story goes viral ===
Feng's sister-in-law and Deng Jiyuan's sister, Deng Jicai (Chinese: 邓吉彩; pinyin: Dèng Jícǎi), came back from Hubei the day after the abortion and brought a video camera with her to film Feng. A family planning official, who discovered the tape, then demanded that it be erased. However, Jicai was able to capture several pictures with her cell phone. On June 11, a picture of Feng lying in a hospital bed "staring at the ceiling with dull eyes" next to the bloody corpse was posted on Chinese social media website Sina Weibo, along with an image of a threatening text message sent by authorities. The images prompted outrage, and news of the event spread quickly. Angry comments from around China poured in, with people calling the authorities' actions "an atrocity", "the same as murder". Many comments called for an end to the one-child policy, or tied the case to other controversial topics such as the corruption of local officials or the country's rural-urban divide. Many posts were quickly deleted by government censors. Nonetheless, by June 13, more than 40,000 comments about the photos were present on Sina Weibo, and by June 15, images of Feng were among the most forwarded. "Seven-months pregnant forced abortion" was the website's top search term, and more than one million user comments were logged on the topic. Discussion also spread to other social media outlets, including NetEase, where threads critical of the government were quickly locked to prevent further discussion.

Zhang Kai (Chinese: 张凯; pinyin: Zhāng Kǎi), a lawyer known for his representation of the disadvantaged, posted the story on his blog. Li Chengpeng, a Chinese blogger with at the time more than five million followers, learned of the story and wrote "the purpose of family planning was to control population, but now it has become murder population ... If this evil policy is not stopped, this country will have no humanity." Zhao Chu, a writer decried the one-child policy as a "profit-oriented activity that everyone hates", writing "this is not about enforcing the policy, it is about depriving someone's right to live". Liang Jianzhang, chief executive of Ctrip, called Feng's case "outrageous and violent" and "not unique to Shaanxi", saying that "abolition of the absurd family-planning policy is the only way to root out this kind of evil".

Local newspaper Hua Shang Bao ran a story on Feng. On June 12, human rights activist Huang Qi also posted the story and images. The story was then picked up by major media outlets throughout China. On his personal Weibo account, chief editor of the Chinese Communist Party tabloid Global Times Hu Xijin wrote, "I strongly oppose the barbarous forced abortion", saying the country's family planning enforcement needed to change. However, he stated that overall the one-child policy was a good thing, writing that "the world resources cannot afford to feed a China with billions of people".

On June 13, French news agency Agence France-Presse reported that the graphic images of Feng and her stillborn child "have caused an uproar in China". Al Jazeera also ran a story about Feng that day. The next day, BBC, CNN, The Age, and other major media outlets around the world ran articles on the topic.

=== Chinese government response ===
After the story of Feng Jianmei's abortion gained widespread domestic and international exposure, Zhenping County officials denied the allegations, saying that the abortion was legal and that Feng had requested it. "Feng agreed to go through an operation to end the pregnancy on June 2 following repeated mediation by the township officials", read the county's website. They further stated that she did not have a local hukou registration and that the couple was not entitled to a second child. The statement was later removed, with a search for Feng's name causing an "error" message. A few days later, local family planning official Yuan Fang stated the request for 40,000 yuan was "a deposit" that would have been returned after Feng filed the necessary paperwork.

A hospital employee acknowledged that Feng was staying there and that the hospital "implements" family planning policy and "provides services" to that effect, but denied that forced abortion was a part of what they do. He said he didn't know the details of Feng's case but stated that "she is probably just exaggerating things on the Internet". It was soon revealed that the Zeng Jia Township had failed to reach its enforcement quotas under the one-child policy for the past two years, so it had received a "yellow card" warning. Desiring to remove the warning, town officials decided to crack down on enforcement in June 2012.

Approximately ten days after the forced abortion occurred, the Shaanxi Provincial Population and Family Planning Commission launched an investigation. On June 13, Yu Yanmei, the deputy head of Ankang, visited the Deng household. Two days later, the commission concluded that Feng had indeed been forced into an illegal abortion, writing, "Such practice has seriously violated the relevant policies ... harmed the image of our family planning work, and caused extremely poor effects in society." Three officials, including the head of the local family-planning department, were suspended from their jobs on June 14. An employee of the Ankang Family Planning Bureau said that "grass-roots comrades aren't stupid, but this is what they're forced to do ... This is a problem with the entire system."

The Ankang city government promised to "pursue strict legal and disciplinary action" once the investigation was finished. On June 14, the city issued a formal apology. "Since the illegal actions by some officials have seriously hurt Feng Jianmei and her family, we want to offer our deep apologies to them and to the generic public", read the statement. The same day, deputy mayor Du Shouping visited Feng in the hospital to express the city's "sincere apologies". "I hope we can earn your forgiveness", he said in a statement published on the city's webpage. The Chinese government also said it had released a pamphlet emphasizing that late term abortion is prohibited and that the legal rights of pregnant women should be maintained.

On June 26, the results of the investigation were announced. The investigation concluded that Feng was not entitled to have a second child due to her non-agricultural hukou, and that she had been told to fix her registration in March. However, Feng's rights were violated by county officials and there was no legal basis for the demanded 40,000 yuan fee. "The incident showed that some officials at the grassroots level have a weak sense of the law and show little concern for the well-being of the people", the report said. The head of the family planning bureau of Zhenping, Jiang Nenghai, and one other official were fired. Five other government and hospital employees received some form of punishment. Additionally, the county government was ordered to provide Feng with a living stipend.

=== Litigation ===
Of the government's actions, Deng Jicai said, "Of course we're not satisfied with the result." She added, "all they've done is punish a few leaders, but they haven't done anything to the people directly responsible for dragging my sister-in-law [Feng] in to have an abortion. They haven't pursued a single person for criminal liability." Jicai also noted that no mention was made of the people who later harassed the family, nor was there any mention of an incident where her brother was attacked and beaten.

Zhang Kai, a lawyer from Beijing, told Deng Jiyuan he would look into filing a lawsuit against the township government. "To force a woman who is seven months pregnant to have an abortion is a serious violation of the law", he said. "At the very least it should be considered willful and malicious injury." Zhang said he hoped the case would cause people to rethink China's population control policies. On June 29, he announced that he was officially representing the family and would seek the help of other lawyers to get the case heard in criminal court. However, he acknowledged that doing so would be difficult. "China's family planning departments are above the law", he explained. "Even when they do something illegal it is rare for them to be held responsible." In response to the lawsuit threats, local officials cancelled a planned meeting to discuss the living stipend, saying they would wait for Jiyuan's return to Zeng Jia Township.

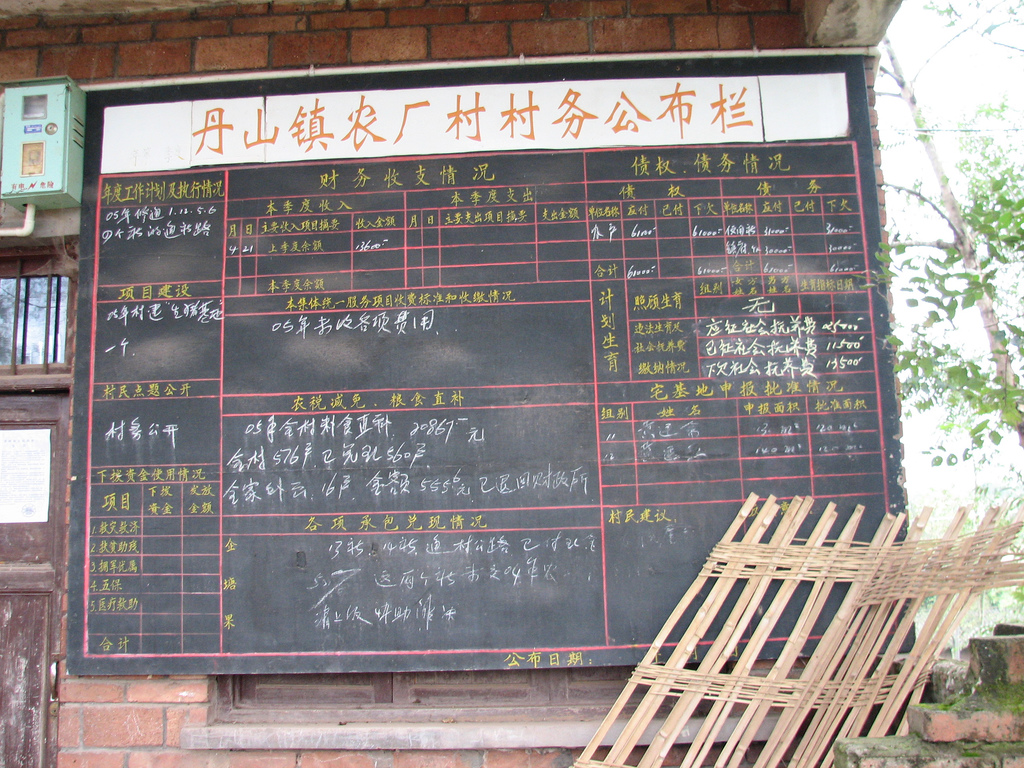
A community bulletin board in Nonguang Village, Sichuan province keeps track of the town's female population, listing recent births by name and noting that several thousand yuan of fines for unauthorized births remain unpaid from the previous year

Judge Xie Xue told reporters that forced abortion would not be classified as homicide or kidnapping, but could qualify as an intentional injury crime. In cases where complications arose after the abortion, such as Feng's, the injury could be considered a serious offense bearing a possible penalty of three to ten years in prison. However, The Wall Street Journal said a legal remedy was unlikely, noting that a 2008 decision by the Supreme People's Court indicated that litigation could not be based on specific provisions of the constitution. Furthermore, family planning law does not have any provision for damages awarded to victims of abuse by government officials.

On July 2, Zhang submitted an official request for the Ankang police to file a case and investigate the officials involved. Subsequently, Deng returned home and decided to negotiate with local authorities. On July 10, the family agreed to settle out of court for 70,600 yuan (~US$11,200). Additionally, the township agreed to pay Feng's medical bills if she contracted a disease from the abortion. "I've given up legal appeals and agreed to take the compensation offered by the township government", Deng remarked. "We just want our normal life back." He added, "It has never been about the money. As ordinary people, we can no longer take the pressure from all sides of the society". Zhang said the family gave up on pursuing criminal charges because local law enforcement was uncooperative, explaining that "if the prosecutors don't fulfill their responsibilities [to press charges], it's impossible to do." An official told Xinhua, China's official state news agency, that the government was committed to providing for the family's financial needs if they should encounter future financial difficulties and that the government would also provide medical care for the Dengs' ailing mother.

Zhang said the compensation could not make up for a lifetime of "spiritual pain" and remarked that 70,000 yuan could not compensate for a lost life. "In terms of compensation, the word satisfaction doesn't even enter the equation", Jiyuan remarked. "But this is the result, so we just have to accept it." Reactions on Chinese social media were mixed, and some commented that the government had gotten too lenient a consequence. International activists said the settlement of Feng's case was just the beginning of the fight to end the one-child policy, with Bob Fu of ChinaAid remarking, "The bottom line is there are hundreds and thousands of [cases like] Feng Jianmei." As of July 13, the family had not received the promised compensation and Jiyuan told reporters he was not sure if it would ever come.

=== Harassment and surveillance of family members ===
In the weeks after Feng Jianmei's story went public, the family suffered from what Zhang called "state-backed harassment". The harassment started when Deng Jiyuan attempted to go to Beijing to talk with a lawyer and do a television interview. Jiyuan's travel attempt was stopped by "more than 100 people and a dozen cars", according to Deng Jicai. Then, "a man suddenly appeared and kicked my brother in the stomach." After Jiyuan was interviewed by Stern magazine on June 22, the harassment from the government became worse, with Jiyuan stating that he was subsequently followed by "local officials and thugs" everywhere he went, even the bathroom. He then disappeared from public sight on June 24, only phoning home on June 26 to say he was safe, but his whereabouts remained unknown.

On June 29, Jiyuan reappeared in Beijing, telling reporters, "I came to Beijing in search of help." He said that he had made two unsuccessful attempts to flee from custody before succeeding on his third try. While his official monitors were on the phone, Jiyuan fled to a friend's home, where he remained for two days. He removed the sim card and battery from his cell phone to prevent being tracked. "I did not sleep or get any new clothes, I could not risk being arrested", he recalled. They rented a car and drove to Beijing, and Jiyuan recalled that "I assumed there would be government people at the train station." Whenever they neared police officers, he would get out of the car and walk to prevent being spotted.

Other family members were also reportedly followed and harassed by government officials. Protestors converged outside the hospital where Feng was staying, carrying a banner that read "severely beat the traitors and expel them". Local media reported that the local government had organized the protest. About a dozen guards patrolled outside Feng's hospital room for two weeks, following family members wherever they went. "We feel like prisoners", remarked Deng Jicai. Supporters of the family allege that local officials were also engaged in an online smear campaign against the family. "The whole family feels very depressed and pressured", said Jicai. On June 26, a visiting family member had their tires slashed. A spokesperson for the Shaanxi provincial government called the allegations of harassment unfounded rumors. However, Liang Zhongtang, an independent researcher, said it was common for people who seek outside help to be harassed by local governments. He speculated that the township government was trying to prevent further media coverage of the case. On July 13, Jiyuan said that he remained concerned over his family's future safety, noting: "There are rumors on the street that after this thing calms down, when people are not paying attention to us anymore, they [the officials who were punished for approving the abortion] will kill my family."

Later, when asked if she still wanted to have another child, Feng told The New York Times, "That depends on how my body recovers. Yes, if I can get my health back."

== Domestic and international response ==
=== Official response and calls to reform in China ===
On June 27, the National Population and Family Planning Commission announced it would conduct a review of family planning enforcement country-wide. As part of the review, ten inspection teams would be sent to nineteen different provinces to review the practices of local offices, and that the teams would be charged with settling disputes and would distribute contraceptives. Commission director Wang Xia said the inspection was of great importance, remarking that "even slight carelessness in law enforcement [damages] the image of the Party and the country." Xia said the review would aim to "strengthen the day-to-day management of services, avoid the use of violence and prevent abuses of administrative enforcement"; he placed a special emphasis on the "social maintenance fees" collected from policy violators. Simultaneously, the commission declared that fines collected for future violations could no longer be spent at the local level, but instead would go into a general fund. He Yafu described the campaign as an attempt by the commission to restore public trust that had been badly damaged by Feng's forced abortion.

On July 3, 2012, an open letter by three members of the Development Research Center of the State Council, a think tank that advises the Chinese ruling cabinet, was published in the group's newspaper, China Economic Times. In the letter they called for "adjustments" to be made to the one-child policy "as soon as possible". The group advised that "an opening up of the two-child option to all should be considered." Demographer Liang Zhongtang said the letter was likely the start of a gradual shift in policy, but that a sudden shift was very unlikely. Although there was no explicit mention of Feng Jianmei in the letter, multiple news sources drew a connection between the timing of the two events. Writing for The New Yorker, Evan Osnos said that "pressure for change of China's one-child policy seems to be mounting" in the wake of Feng's case. On July 5, a group of fifteen scholars released an own open letter to the National People's Congress arguing that change to family planning law was "imperative". The letter mentioned research indicating economic consequences of continuing the one-child policy, but focused on human rights issues, mentioning Feng by name. "Behind these incidents are clear limitations and defects in the nation's family planning laws", read the letter. Liang Jianzhang, one of the letter's signers, told a reporter "From an economic perspective, the one-child policy is irrational. From a human-rights perspective, it's even less rational."

=== International reaction ===
Feng Jianmei's ordeal brought increased scrutiny to China's abortion and population-control policies. International commentators were highly critical of the government's role in Feng's abortion. "Feng Jianmei's story demonstrates how the One-Child Policy continues to sanction violence against women every day", said Chai Ling of the NGO All Girls Allowed. Women's Rights Without Frontiers' president Reggie Littlejohn stated "no legitimate government would commit or tolerate such an act. Those who are responsible should be prosecuted for crimes against humanity." In a press release, the Christian Alliance Defense Fund called Feng's case "nothing less than a crime against humanity" and asked American political leaders to formally condemn the act. The World Evangelical Alliance said it was "outraged" by the incident and asked the Chinese government to "ensure that these tragic incidents are prevented from happening in the future".

On July 5, European Parliament passed a resolution condemning both the treatment of Feng and forced abortions in general, "especially in the context of the one-child policy". The resolution also requested that forced abortion be added the agenda for the next bilateral human rights dialogue with China. Additionally, some Members of the European Parliament (MEPs) requested an independent investigation into forced abortion and infanticide in China. A few days later, MEP Lojze Peterle opined that Chinese family planning law violates provisions outlined by the United Nations in the International Conference on Population and Development. He said the resolution passed by parliament gives the European Commission a "clear mandate" to withdraw funds from any organization potentially involved in aiding coercive practices in China, citing the International Planned Parenthood Federation and Marie Stopes International as two potential targets.

On July 9, the Human Rights Subcommittee of the United States House of Representatives convened a hearing on the one-child policy prompted by Feng's story. In his opening remarks, chairman Chris Smith called the one-child policy "a nightmarish 'brave new world' ... where women are psychologically wounded, girls fall victim to sex-selective abortion ... and most children grow up without brothers or sisters, aunts or uncles or cousins". He said that because of Feng, people were "finally seeing the gruesome reality of China's one-child policy". Congressman Joseph R. Pitts agreed, saying, "It now seems that consensus in China is building towards reforming the policy." Committee witnesses called for a number of responses such as restricting United Nations Population Fund outlays and encouraging U.S. corporations doing business in China to reject the country's family-planning practices at their facilities.

=== International media coverage ===
Feng's case became a focal point for newspaper editorials against China's one-child policy and abortion in general. Opponents of the one-child policy said the case is a potential turning point in the efforts to end the rule. On June 26, Reuters said the story had sparked "a firestorm domestically and around the world", explaining, "Feng Jianmei's abortion was portrayed in the Chinese and international press as an example of the extreme measures some officials would take to control China's population, even if it meant breaking Chinese law." A story in The Wall Street Journal remarked that the case "dramatize[s] the harshness of the one-child policy". The incident prompted Evan Osnos, The New Yorker writer, to create a feature piece titled "Abortion and Politics in China". Osnos said that "the Feng case is emblematic of some of the most inflammatory issues on Chinese public life", including money, government corruption, the household registration system, and of course family planning, and that "the case is a dramatic demonstration of exactly why the Communist Party had reason to be afraid of the Internet."

On June 23, The Economist featured a story on China's one-child policy, focusing on Feng's forced abortion and how the internet was changing power dynamics in China. "Three years ago, Ms. Feng's suffering might have gone unnoticed ... But her relatives uploaded the graphic pictures onto the internet, and soon microblogs had flashed them to millions of people across the country", writes the article's author. Wang Songlian, a researcher for Chinese Human Rights Defenders, said it was certain that the internet had made discussion of Feng's case possible, but she called the officials' punishments "isolated" and said "government officials are virtually immune in using violence and carrying out the policy by force. We've not seen any significant [change] in holding officials accountable."

A June 22 editorial in The Australian argued against the one-child policy, stating that Feng's case "one small example of the terrible costs of China's longstanding population control regime". A June 25 editorial in the Herald Sun, which examined family planning in general, said that Feng "personifies the end game of forced population limits".

Several commentators have compared Feng Jianmei to Liu Yang, who was in the news at roughly the same time for becoming the first Chinese female in space. On June 17, the Tea Leaf Nation blog published a story entitled "Netizens Reflect As One Chinese Woman Touches Heaven, Another Hell". The story, focused on a widely distributed Sina Weibo post, features pictures of Feng and Liu side by side, and the blogger wrote in the caption "The stark contrast between the fates of [the] two women ... is the clearest illustration of the torn state of this nation." The post was quickly re-tweeted by famous blogger Han Han. By the time the government deleted both posts, the information had already been shared 70,000 times in the first 24 hours. The International Herald Tribune immediately picked up the story, stating, "The gruesome abortion incident was cast this weekend against China's successful launching of its first female astronaut. The sad irony of the two women's situations was not lost on Chinese netizens." Two days later, the Global Post published the story and commented, "leave it to Sina Weibo to point out what's important", explaining that the juxtaposition of the two new stories "[highlights] China's current troubled and contradictory state ... Some Chinese women get launched into space, others receive injections that kill their unborn child."

Journalist Andrew Bolt used Feng's case to editorialize against abortion in Australia, writing, "Deng Jiyuan has shamed the tyrants of Beijing. But ... he shames us here as well." He compared Feng's abortion to famous cases in Australia and concluded that the main difference was the graphic pictures of Feng's baby.

Asia Times Online featured Feng's story in an editorial titled "China's addiction to birth planning". Author Peter Lee remarked that it was "disturbing" how many resources the township devoted to persuading Feng, quoting an official as saying, "On that day, pretty much all of the township leadership and relevant staff all went [to get Feng to the hospital]." He concluded that the way the case was handled provides strong evidence that at least some of China's leaders are anxious to end the one-child policy. In contrast, an editorial published in The Peninsula argued that the case showed China's leaders were losing their ability to control local authorities.

He Yafu says the controversy has damaged the public image of one-child policy in China. Journalist Fareed Zakaria suggested there were signs that the Chinese government was softening its rules, noting the large number of prominent citizens who spoke out against Feng's abortion. Zakaria wrote, "Even a few years ago, it would have taken a very brave Chinese thinker to pose that question in public." However, he said that formal change would be impossible before a change in leadership occurred, and even then would "take much courage".

A July 17 piece in The Huffington Post said that the case "captured the public imagination in China because it exemplifies broader systemic issues". Feng's case had been cited by both opponents and advocates of the right to abortion care in the United States in support of their causes; for abortion opponents, the case represented "the kind of 'federally endorsed' abortions that they fear may lie in store for the United States", while for advocates of abortion rights, "[Feng] should have been granted a choice in the first place."
