= Embassy of France, Beijing =

Embassy of France in Beijing Ambassade de France en Chine 法国驻华大使馆
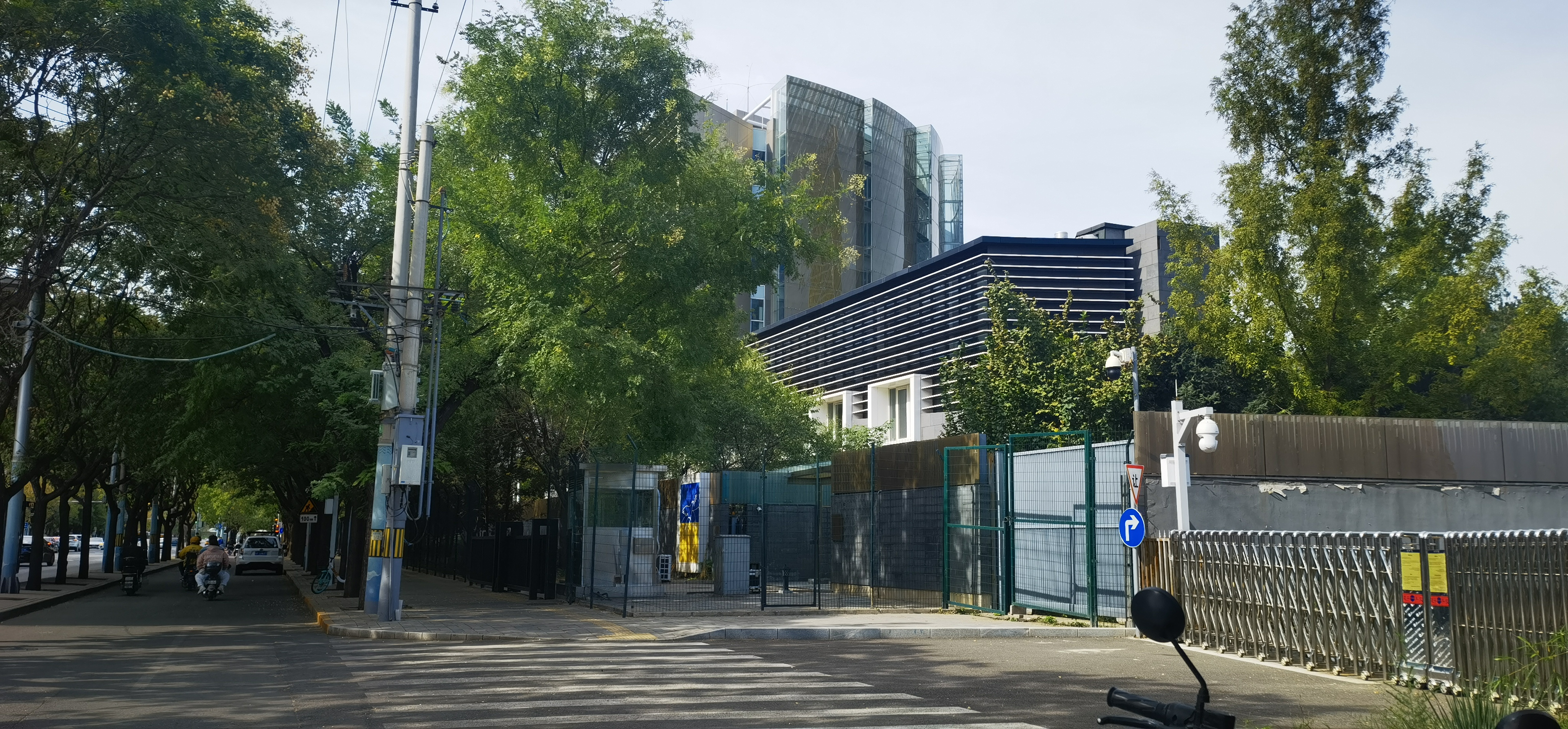
- Location: Chaoyang District, Beijing, China
- Address: 60 Tianze Rd., Chaoyang District, Beijing
- Coordinates: 39°57′09″N 116°28′09″E
- Ambassador: Bertrand Lortholary
- Website: cn.ambafrance.org

The Embassy of France in Beijing (French: Ambassade de France en Chine; Chinese: 法国驻华大使馆) is the official diplomatic mission of the French Republic to the People's Republic of China. The embassy building was opened in 2011, and the current ambassador is Bertrand Lortholary.

== Embassy Building ==
The embassy is located in the Chaoyang District, the main district for embassies in Beijing. The building also hosts a consular mission in addition to the embassy.

The new embassy was opened on October 28, 2011, which was designed by the architect Alain Sarfati. It is located at the intersection of Liangmaqiao and Tianze streets and includes all the embassy services as well as the French residence. the 8-story-prominence “tower” in the center of the building is intended to give an urban dimension that integrates into the city. The garden of the residence is made up of a central lawn with two avenues of maple trees on either side.

== See also ==
- China-France relations
- Embassy of China, Paris
- List of diplomatic missions of France
- List of diplomatic missions in China
