= Embassy of China, Paris =

Embassy of the People's Republic of China in the Republic of France 中华人民共和国 驻法兰西共和国大使馆
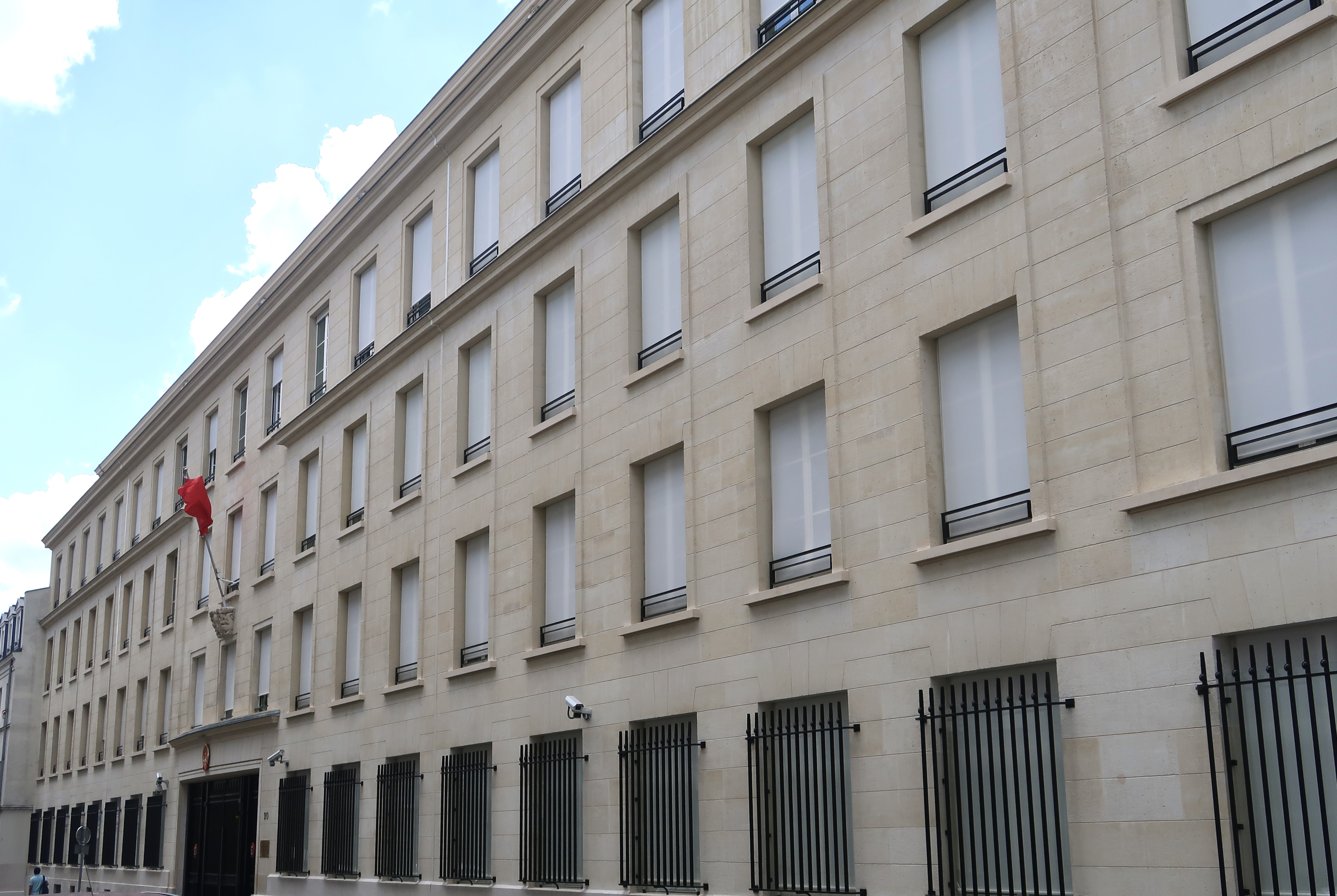
- Address: 20 Monsieur Rd. 7th Arrondissement, Paris
- Coordinates: 48°51′01″N 02°18′57″E
- Ambassador: Deng Li
- Website: fr.china-embassy.gov.cn/fra/

The Embassy of the People's Republic of China in the Republic of France (Chinese: 中华人民共和国驻法兰西共和国大使馆; French: Ambassade de la République populaire de Chine en République française) is the official diplomatic mission of the People's Republic of China to the French Republic, located in Paris. The embassy was first established in 1964, and the current ambassador is Deng Li.

The Chinese embassy has been criticized for targeting French scholars, journalists, and lawmakers who question Beijing's central government policies. In 2024, members of the embassy attempted a forced repatriation of a political dissident who had shared articles unfavorable to Chinese authorities.

== History ==
On January 27, 1964, China and France issued a joint communique (Note: Text: Le gouvernement de la République française et le gouvernement de la République populaire de Chine ont décidé d’un commun accord d’établir des relations diplomatiques. Ils sont convenus à cet effet de désigner des ambassadeurs dans un délai de trois mois.), officially establishing diplomatic relations. The government of the Republic of China soon withdrew its delegation in France, and the chargé d'affaires of the new Chinese Embassy in France immediately took over the former property of the ROC. On April 1, 2017, the headquarters of the Chinese Embassy in France moved to a new location in the 7th arrondissement of Paris. The Chinese Embassy in France purchased the property for the new embassy in December 2010 and officially started construction in 2014. The new building consists of the French historical and cultural heritage Montesquieu Mansion, administrative buildings, gardens and courtyards. It is adjacent to the French Prime Minister's Office, the Ministry of Foreign Affairs, the UNESCO Headquarters, the Rodin Museum, etc. The original embassy building is still the Chinese Embassy in France, and parts of the building will continue to be used as additional area for the embassy after the completion of renovations.

== Controversies ==
=== Articles regarding Tedros Adhanom Ghebreyesus ===
On April 12, 2020, the Chinese Embassy in France published a series of controversial articles in Chinese and French on its website that disparaged European and American countries and praised China's fight during the COVID-19 pandemic, which aroused strong dissatisfaction among the French public. One of the article was titled "Restore the Distorted Facts: Observations of a Chinese Diplomat in Paris", which accused the nursing staff in a nursing home of giving up their duties during the pandemic, leading to the deaths of many elderly by hunger or disease. This attracted many in France, partly because the French version used the abbreviation "Ehpad" (referring to a place of accommodation for the elderly). The French Ministry of Foreign Affairs then summoned Lu Shaye, the Chinese ambassador to France, to express its protest for the article.

Another article cited an unnamed Chinese diplomat, who accused the Taiwanese authorities, with the support of more than 80 French parliamentarians, of using the word nègre to attack Tedros Adhanom Ghebreyesus, the Director-General of the World Health Organization. This created debates from various groups among the French public, and Taiwan responded by decrying it as false information. Regarding this incident, Chinese Foreign Ministry Spokesperson Zhao Lijian declined to comment a response to the articles published by the embassy, who only criticized Western media and politicians for spreading false information. News also stated that these people had made unfounded criticisms of Sino-French cooperation and the fight against the epidemic.

On April 22, the Chinese Embassy in France clarified that it was the Taiwanese authorities who used the word to attack Tedros Adhanom Ghebreyesus, while more than 80 French parliamentarians co-signed the Taiwan-related article in support of the Taiwanese authorities. Also the word "Ehpad" turns out to be quoted from media reports in other European countries and does not involve France.

=== Attacks on French scholars and lawmakers ===
On March 19, 2021, the Chinese embassy published an article ridiculing Antoine Bondaz, a scholar of Foundation for Strategic Research as a petite frappe (little rogue), which led to condemnation from the French public. Bondaz expressed worry over the Chinese ambassador's capacity to flagrantly use inappropriate language to ridicule others.

Two days later, the embassy published a 1,600 word-long article, claiming that the original comment was not directed at Bondaz. However, the article then proceeds to criticize French media as "crazy dogs" for provoking the so-called Wolf warrior diplomacy, if one such exists. The article also then portrays Bondaz to be "hyènes folles" (crazy hyena) and a "troll idéologique" (ideological troll). The article further attacks the foundation by claiming it to be "s'affublent des habits de chercheurs et de médias et s'en prennent furieusement à la Chine" (pretending to be researchers and journalists while furiously attacking China), and that there is nothing "scholarly" about the foundation.

The embassy also published a piece, where it criticizes the anti-Chinese "fringe" of French society to "have more self-respect" and that they should not "humiliate the French culture that Chinese people have long admired". The piece was received negatively from French public opinion. Bondaz also criticized the embassy's behavior, and expressed his sorrow for the "lack of punishment" for the "unrestrained speech" of Chinese diplomats worldwide. He further claimed that the embassy frequently attacks those who are critical of the Chinese regime and supportive of Taiwan.

The French foreign minister, Agnès von der Mühll, also expressed her condemnation for the ambassador's crude remarks against French scholars and lawmakers, and reiterated that these behaviors have no place in diplomacy and are in no way constructive towards furthering China-France relations. She further called on Chinese diplomats to abide by the Vienna Convention on Diplomatic Relations, the basic provisions of foreign embassies on public communication and France's principle of separation of powers. She also expressed regret that French lawmakers who planned to go to Taiwan were threatened.

French Foreign Minister Jean-Yves Le Drian sent two stern tweets that night targeting the Chinese Embassy in France: "In our relationship with China, there is no place for any insults and intimidations directed at elected officials or researchers. We support those who embody freedom of speech and democracy, no matter the time and no matter the place." He further emphasized that "The remarks and actions of the Chinese Embassy in France against European parliamentarians, scholars and diplomats are completely unacceptable. I have requested that the Chinese Ambassador to France be summoned, To solemnly remind him of these messages." The Chinese Embassy in France issued a document that day refusing the summons of the French Ministry of Foreign Affairs, and instead went to the foreign ministry the next day to criticize the EU's sanctions against Chinese personnel and institutions, as well as Taiwan-related issues.

=== Attacks on French media ===
On October 25, 2021, the official website of the Chinese Embassy in France issued a statement titled "China must be reunified and will inevitably be reunified". The statement included attacks on Le Figaro reporter Sébastien Falletti, claiming that many of his articles were based on denounced lies that seriously misled the public, and that his articles fabricated false narratives of "democracy versus authoritarianism". The embassy further depreciated Falletti's description of Taiwanese leader Tsai Ing-wen as a "champion of democracy", instead propagating the idea of a development of "green terror" in Taiwan since Tsai came to power, involving policies like partisan political struggles, corruption, abuse of power, and power peddling.

The statement then went on to discuss the historic ties between Taiwan and China, asserting that Taiwan has been an integral part of China's territory since ancient times. The embassy then explained that Taiwan was Chinese as early as 230 AD, during the Three Kingdoms period in China, when Soochow had sent personnel to develop and manage the Taiwan island, which it ridiculed predated even than even the existence of France. The statement then asserts that because of Taiwan's historic ties to China, the means for resolving the Taiwan issue is a mere domestic matter for China, and that "a complete reunification of Chinese territory would be the most beneficial factor for regional peace and stability".

The embassy's statement claimed to find Falletti's comment that China's use of military means to resolve Taiwan would result in "World War III" to be scandalous, and encouraged that French journalists "abide by professional ethics and respect basic facts" instead.

On October 27, Reporters Without Borders (RSF) published a comment to Lu Shaye, "We politely call on the Chinese Ambassador in Paris to stop his wanton abuse of journalists," insisting that diplomats are not qualified to teach news reporting, especially coming from one of the worst regimes in the world for press freedom. Christophe Deloire, Secretary-General of RSF, criticized the Chinese ambassador's comments on Falletti and Lemaître. Delors then issued the following statement: "We have to call him very politely to put an end to his wanton abuse of the news media. If Lu Shaye feels that the French media is too independent for his taste, he is free to request that he be transferred to another authoritarian country, such as North Korea, where he will feel at home, since only regime propaganda has the right to speak”.

=== Disinformation regarding the origin of COVID-19 ===
On July 12, 2022, the official Twitter of the Chinese Embassy in France forwarded a message from Chinese state media, claiming that American experts were very convinced that the new coronavirus came from an American laboratory. The disinformation originated from a statement made by Jeffrey Sachs of The Lancet's COVID-19 committee during a meeting in Spain: "I'm pretty convinced it came out of US lab biotechnology — not out of nature.", which has since been widely shared among news outlets in China and Russia. In reality, though, Sachs's remarks were conditional, where he clearly stated: “If the virus does come from laboratory research and experiments, then it is almost certainly created by Chinese researchers based on American biotechnology and know-how”.

=== Image of American astronauts ===
On September 9, 2023, the Chinese Embassy in France tweeted: "Three astronauts from the Shenzhou 15 team received awards on Thursday for their services to China's space program.”, which was accompanied by a photo taken by an astronaut in outer space with the Earth as the background. Netizens discovered that the astronaut in the photo was not a Chinese astronaut, but an American astronaut wearing an American flag armband. Badiucao retweeted it and paired it with an enlarged picture of an American armband with the caption "Is this the Chinese flag?".

=== Forced repatriations of political dissidents ===
On May 1, 2024, an investigation by Envoyé Special and Challenges revealed that on March 22, 2024, the political dissident Ling Huazhan was pressured to get to a Paris airport to embark on a flight for Guangzhou on an operation orchestrated by two Chinese diplomats with the help of the Chinese association Amours et Cœurs Unis. An altercation ensued at the airport, which ended with the police stopping the repatriation but letting the main orchestrator of it go because of their diplomatic immunity.

The Embassy of China denied the forced repatriation, stating that Ling had wanted to go to the airport voluntarily and the whole affair was a media play to stain the France-China political relationship.

Ling Huazhan had been targeted for tags against the Chinese president Xi Jinping and sharing articles critical of the regime. It was later revealed that the French President Emmanuel Macron had privately given the order to expel the two men principally responsible for the missed repatriation, the head of the Chinese Ministry of State Security in Paris and his deputy.

== List of ambassadors ==
Though the People's Republic of China was founded in 1949, France did not recognize it until 1964 under Charles De Gaulle.

- Song Zhiguang (1964–1964)
- Huang Zhen (1964–1971)
- Zeng Tao (1973–1977)
- Han Kehua (1977–1980)
- Yao Guang (1980–1982)
- Cao Keqiang (1983–1986)
- Zhou Jue (1986–1986)
- Cai Fangbai (1990–1998)
- Wu Jianmin (1998–2003)
- Zhou Jinjun (2003–2008)
- Kong Quan (2008–2013)
- Zhai Jun (2014–2019)
- Lu Shaye (2019–2025)
- Deng Li (2025-present)

== See also ==
- China-France relations
- Embassy of France, Beijing
- List of diplomatic missions of China
- List of diplomatic missions in France
