= China–France relations =

Interstate relations between China and France

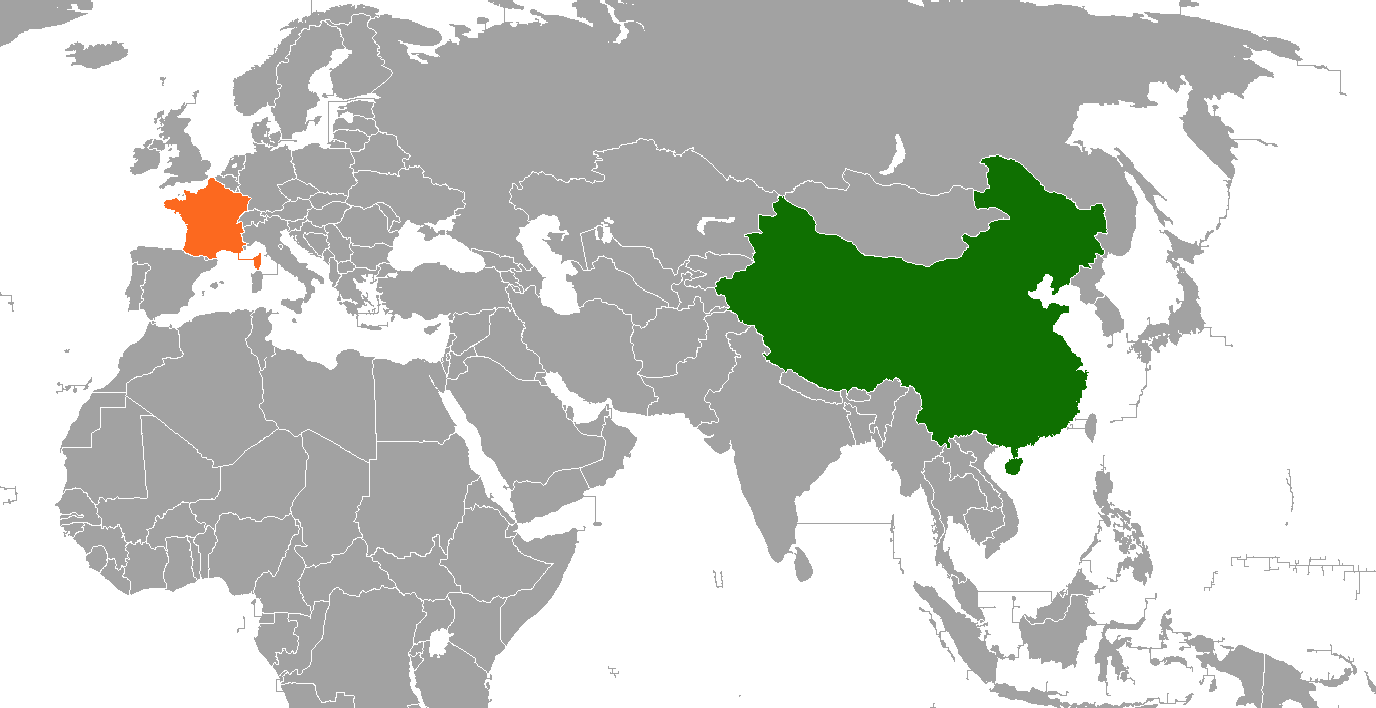
- China: France

China–France relations

Chinese name
- Traditional Chinese: 中法關係
- Simplified Chinese: 中法关系
Transcriptions
Standard Mandarin
- Hanyu Pinyin: Zhōng-Fǎ guānxì

French name
- French: Relations franco-chinoises

China–France relations, also known as Franco-Chinese relations or Sino-French relations, are the interstate relations between China and France (Kingdom or later).

The meaning of both "China" and "France" as entities has changed throughout history; this article discusses what was commonly considered 'France' and 'China' at the time of the relationships in question. There have been many political, cultural and economic relationships between the two countries since the Middle Ages. Rabban Bar Sauma from China visited France and met with King Philip IV of France. William of Rubruck encountered the French silversmith Guillaume Bouchier in the Mongol city of Karakorum. By the 1920s and 1930s, the French Concession, from 1849 until it dissolves during World War II in 1943, had expanded into a sprawling 15,150-acre haven. It became universally known as the "Paris of the East" and the birthplace of the Chinese Communist Party (CCP) since its establishment on 23 July 1921.

Present-day relations are marked by both countries' respective regional powers stature (in the EU for France and Asia for China), as well as their shared status as G20 economies, permanent members of the UN Security Council, and internationally recognized nuclear-weapon states. Key differences include questions of trade, democracy, and human rights.

== History ==
=== 17th and 18th centuries ===
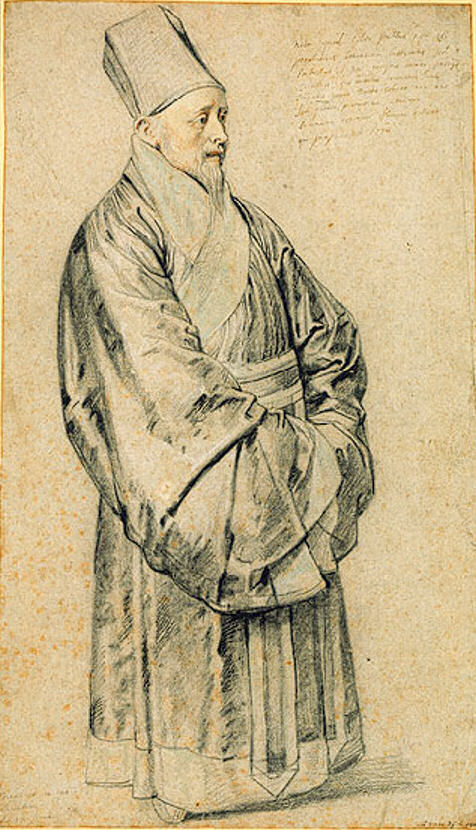
Nicolas Trigault (1577–1629) in Chinese costume, by Peter Paul Rubens.

In 1698-1700 CE first French embassy to China took place via sea route. Numerous French Jesuits were active in China during the 17th and 18th centuries: Nicolas Trigault (1577–1629), Alexander de Rhodes (1591–1660, active in Vietnam), Jean-Baptiste Régis (1663–1738), Jean Denis Attiret (1702–1768), Michel Benoist (1715–1774), Joseph-Marie Amiot (1718–1793).

French Jesuits pressured the French king to send them to China with the aims of counterbalancing the influence of Ottoman Empire in Europe. The Jesuits sent by Louis XIV were: Jean de Fontaney (1643–1710), Joachim Bouvet (1656–1730), Jean-François Gerbillon (1654–1707), Louis Le Comte (1655–1728) and Claude de Visdelou (1656–1737). Returning to France, they noticed the similarity between Louis XIV of France and the Kangxi Emperor of China. Both were said to be servants of God, and to control their respective areas: France being the strongest country of Europe, and China being the strongest power in East Asia. Other biographical factors lead commentators to proclaim that Louis XIV and the Kangxi Emperor were protected by the same angel. (In childhood, they overcame the same illness; both reigned for a long time, with many conquests.)

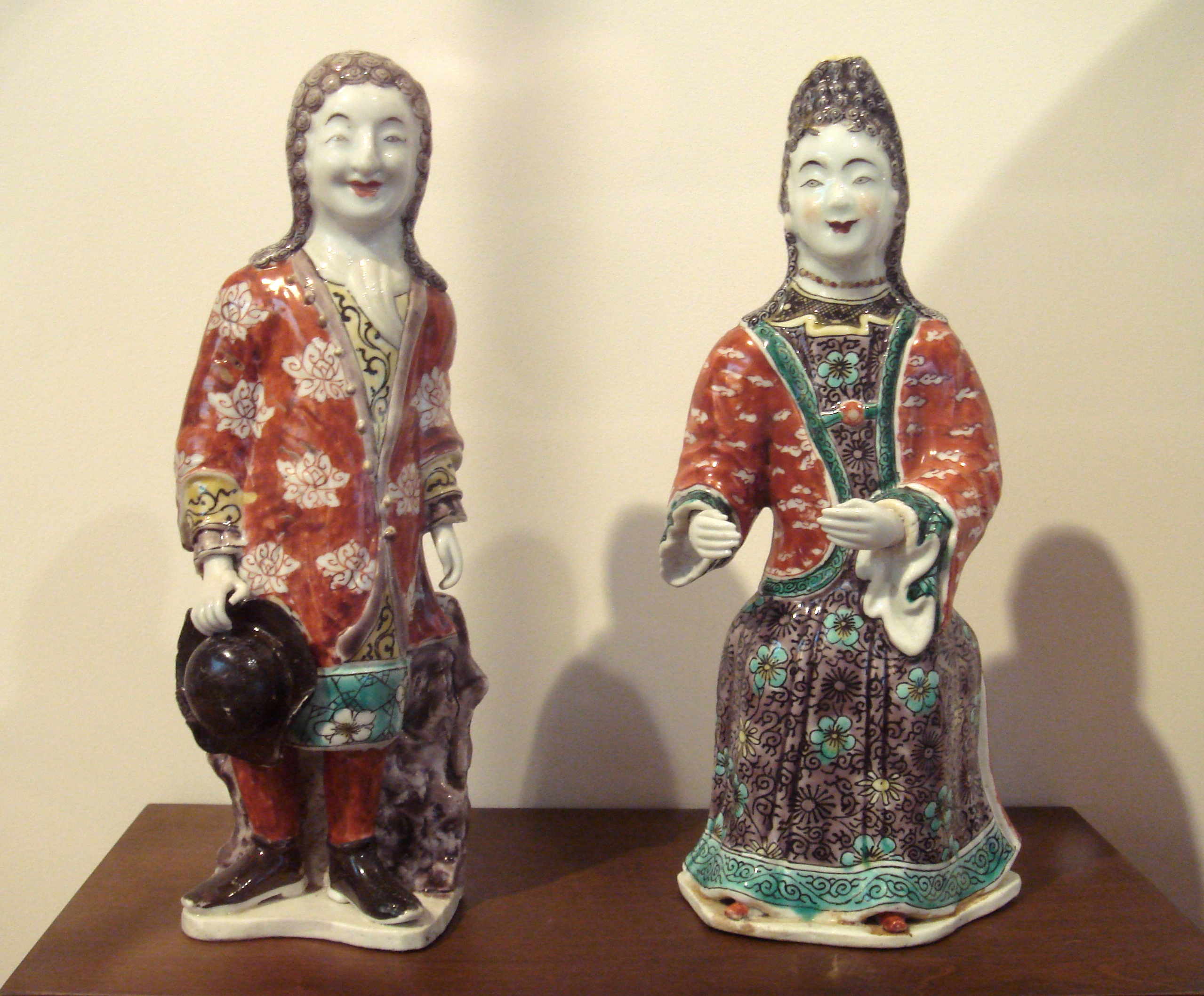
European couple, Kangxi period.

Under Louis XIV's reign, the work of these French researchers sent by the King had a notable influence on Chinese sciences, but continued to be mere intellectual games, and not tools to improve the power of man over nature. Conversely, Chinese culture and style became fashionable in France, exemplified by the Chinoiserie fashion, and Louis XIV had the Trianon de Porcelaine built in Chinese style in 1670. France became the European center for Chinese porcelains, silks and lacquers and European imitations of these goods.

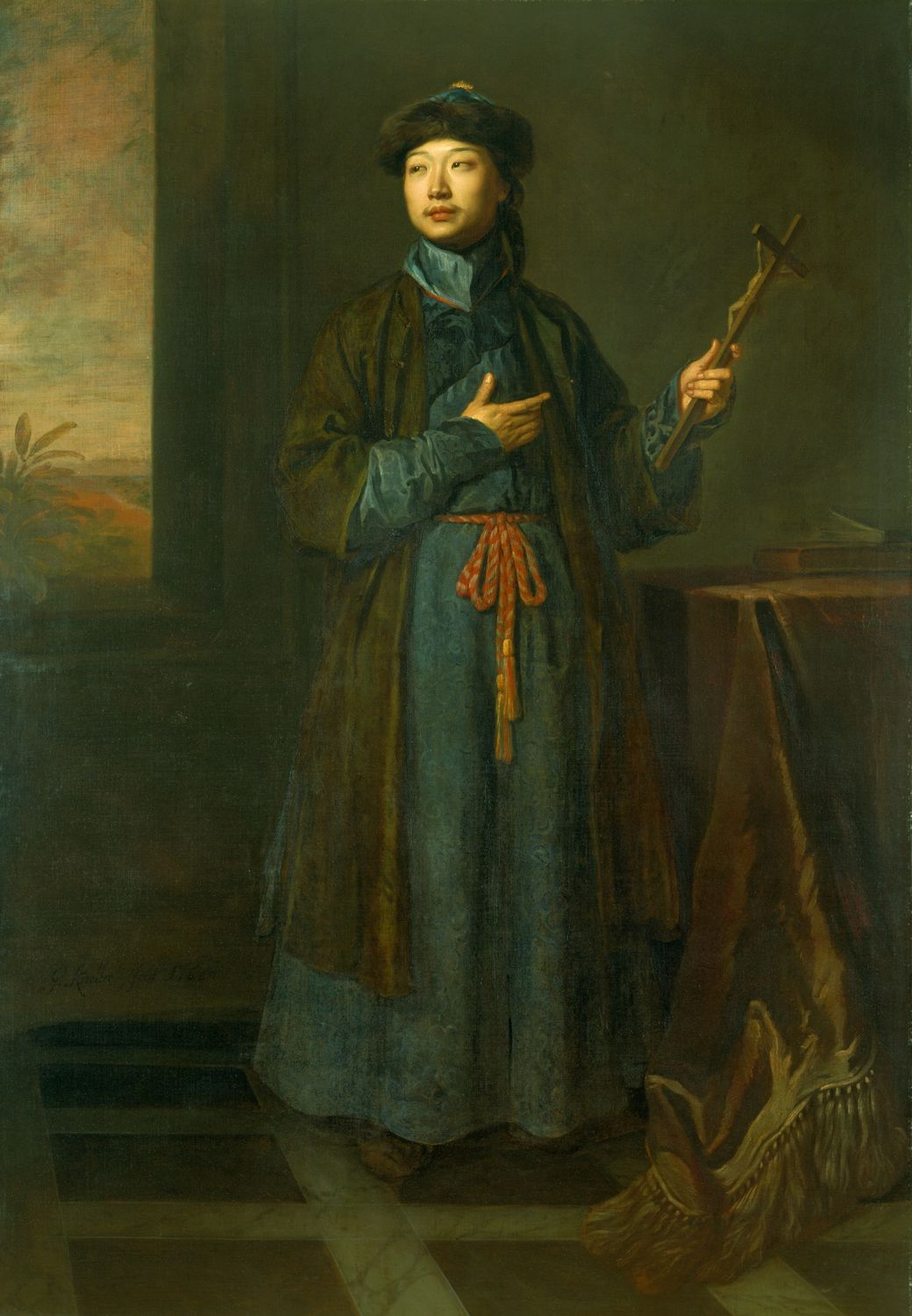
Michel Sin visited France in 1684. "The Chinese Convert" by Sir Godfrey Kneller, 1687.

At the same time, the first ever known Chinese people came to France. Michel Sin arrived in Versailles in 1684 before continuing on to England. More notable was Arcadio Huang, who crossed France in 1702, spent some time in Rome (as a result of the Chinese Rites controversy), and returned to Paris in 1704, where he was the "Chinese interpreter of the King" before he died in 1716. He started the first ever Chinese-French dictionary, and a Chinese grammar to help French and European researchers to understand and study Chinese, but died before finishing his work.

Paris-based geographers processed reports and cartographic material supplied by mostly French Jesuit teams traveling across the Qing dynasty, and published a number of high-quality works, the most important of which was Description de la Chine et de la Tartarie Chinoise edited by Jean-Baptiste Du Halde (1736), with maps by Jean Baptiste Bourguignon d'Anville.

In the 18th century, the French Jesuit priest Michel Benoist, together with Giuseppe Castiglione, helped the Qianlong Emperor build a European-style area in the Old Summer Palace (often associated with European-style palaces built of stone), to satisfy his taste for exotic buildings and objects. Jean Denis Attiret became a painter to the Qianlong Emperor. Joseph-Marie Amiot (1718–1793) also won the confidence of the emperor and spent the remainder of his life in Beijing. He was official translator of Western languages for the emperor, and the spiritual leader of the French mission in Peking.

=== 19th century ===
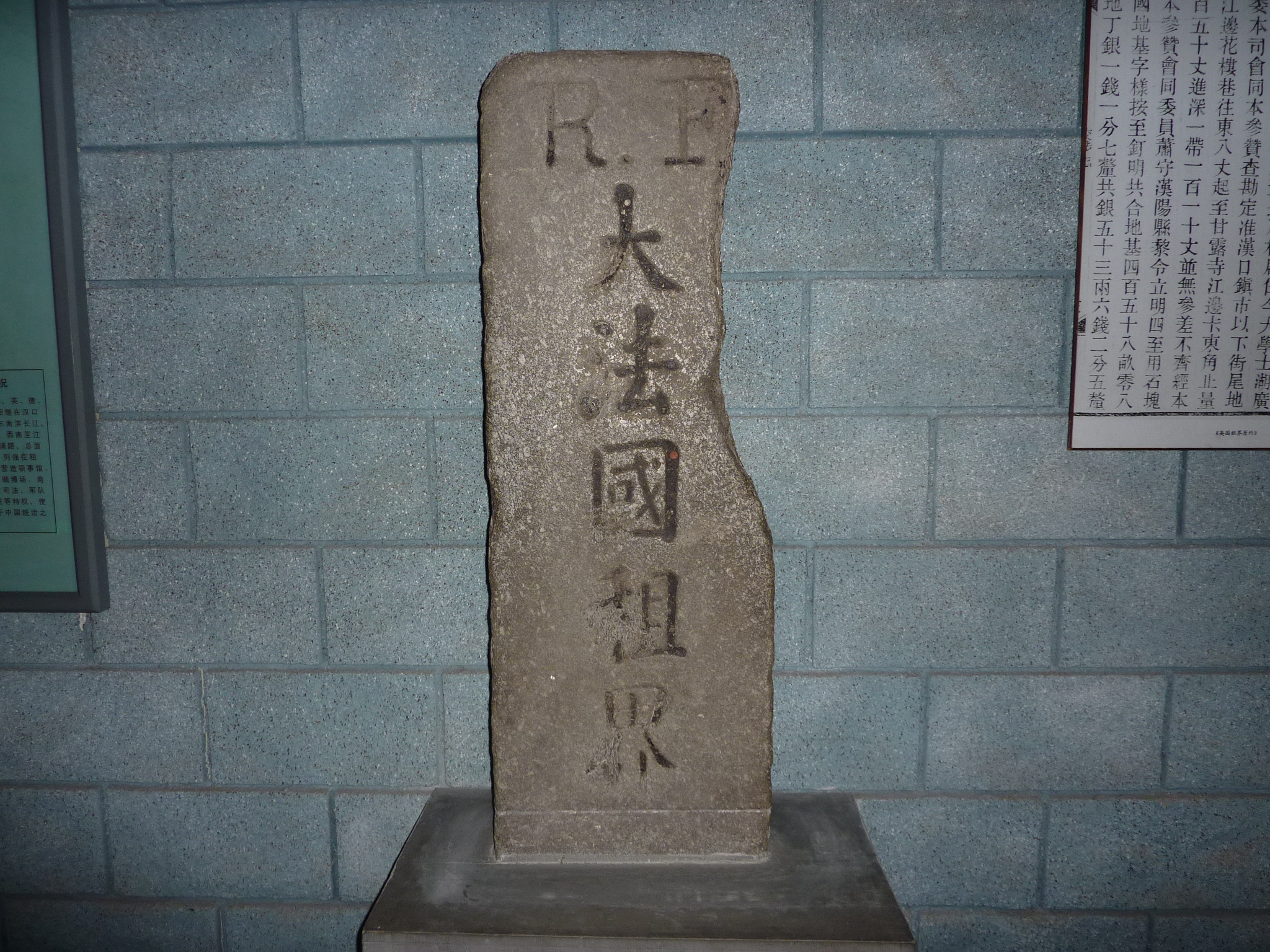
A boundary marker from the French concession in Hankou

France asserted itself as the protector of the Catholic Church in China from the 1840s to 1920s. Lacking significant commercial ties to China, France focused on its religious role as a major aspect of its diplomacy with China.

French Catholic missionaries were active in the Qing dynasty; they were funded by appeals in French churches for money. The Holy Childhood Association (L'Oeuvre de la Sainte Enfance) was a Catholic charity founded in 1843 to rescue Chinese children from infanticide. It was a target of Chinese anti-Christian protests notably in the Tianjin Massacre of 1870. Rioting sparked by false rumors of the killing of babies led to the death of a French consul and provoked a diplomatic crisis.

In 1844, China and France concluded its first modern treaty, the Treaty of Whampoa, which demanded for France the same privileges extended to Britain.

Beginning in the 1840s, France asserted a religious protectorate in China over the Catholic Church there. It began as a foreign policy goal of the French civil government through its foreign minister to China, Marie Melchior Joseph Théodose de Lagrené. A Catholic, de Lagrené viewed the negotiation of the Treaty of Whampoa as an opportunity to improve the prestige of France and the Catholic Church through religious policy. He asked his Qing government counterpart, Qiying, to persuade the Daoguang Emperor to provide religious toleration for Catholics as a demonstration of goodwill for France. Hoping that doing so would create division between the French imperialists and the Protestant British imperialists, the Daoguang Emperor agreed. Various historical views date the ending of the French religious protectorate in China to 1922 or the 1940s.

The Treaty of Whampoa institutionalised benefits for French Catholics, including the ability to operate and establish religious institutions in the treaty ports, decriminalisation of Catholicism throughout China, and providing that any missionaries discovered by Chinese authorities outside the treaty ports should be escorted to a French consulate. De Lagrené negotiated an edict which the Daoguang Emperor issued in 1846 which reaffirmed the free exercise of Catholic religious practice, mandated punishment for Chinese officials who persecuted Catholics, and restored to local Catholics all church property seized since the Kangxi Emperor's ban on Christianity in the early 18th century. The result in the subsequent decades was that magistrates dealing with Catholics in China were required to negotiate with French officials and address both domestic law and treaty law.

In 1860, the Summer Palace was sacked by Anglo-French troops and many precious artifacts found their way into French museums following the sack.. France obtained further privileges through the Sino-French Beijing Convention of 1860, which followed the Qing government's loss in the Second Opium War. Christian missionaries had the ability to travel anywhere in China's interior and buy property in China's interior.

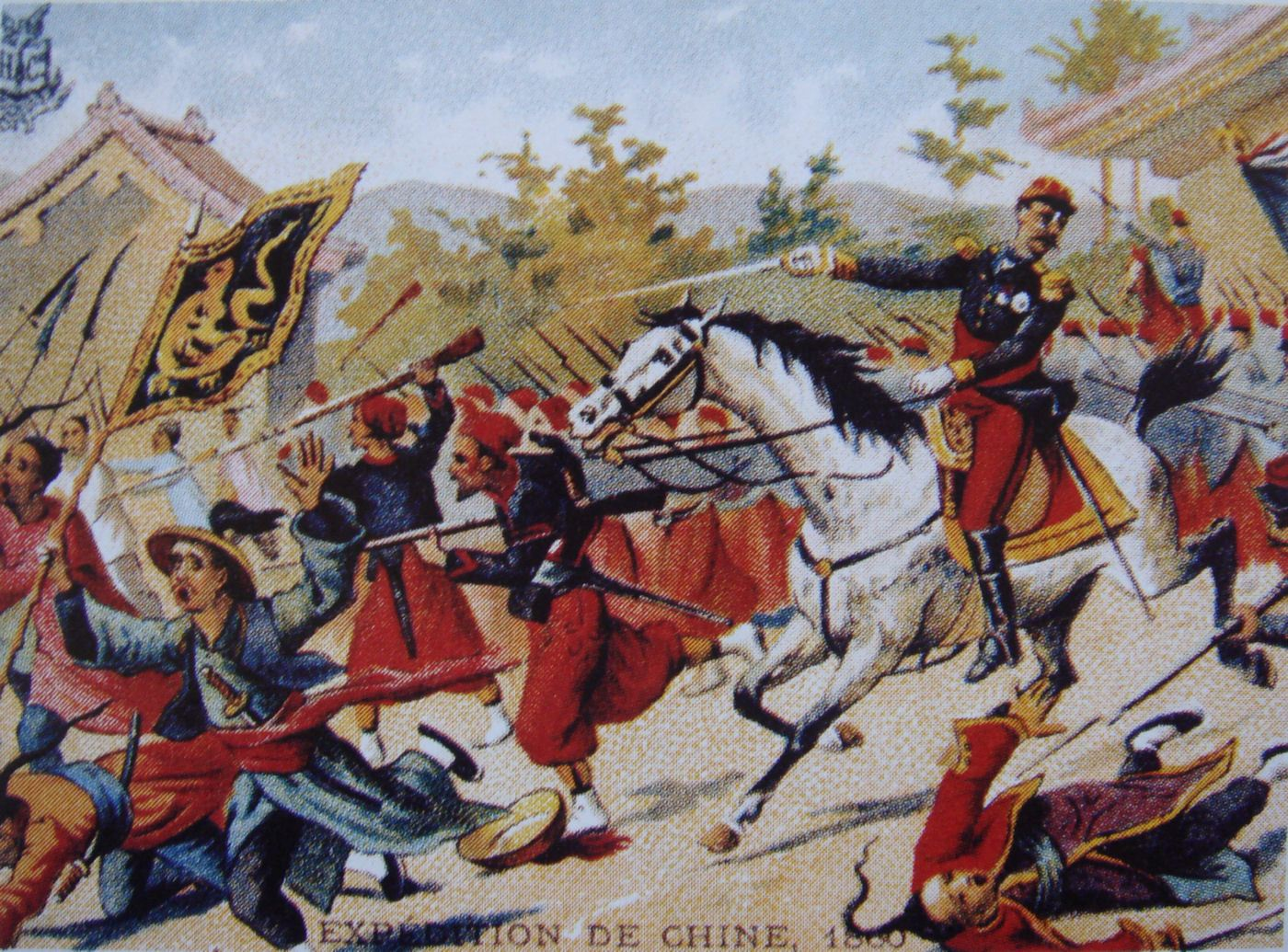
Cousin-Montauban leading French forces during the Anglo-French expedition to China in 1860

==== Sino-French war, 1884-1885 ====
For centuries China had claimed the Indo-China territory to its south as a tributary state, but France began a series of invasions, turning French Indochina into its own colony. France and China clashed over control of Annam. The result was a conflict in 1884–85. The undeclared war was militarily a stalemate, but it was recognized that France had control of Annam and Indochina was no longer a tributary of China. The main political result was that the war strengthened the control of Empress Dowager Cixi over the Chinese government, giving her the chance to block modernization programs needed by the Chinese military. The war was unpopular in France and it brought down the government of Prime Minister Jules Ferry. Historian Lloyd Eastman concluded in 1967:

The Chinese, although fettered by outmoded techniques and shortages of supplies, had fought the French to a stalemate. China lost, it is true, its claim to sovereignty over Vietnam, and that country remained under French dominance until 1954. But the French had been denied an indemnity; railroad construction had been averted; and imperial control of the southern boundaries of the rich natural resources lying within those boundaries had not been broken. In short, China was not much changed by the war.

In 1897, France seized Kwangchow Wan, (Guangzhouwan) as a treaty port, and took its own concession in the treaty port of Shanghai. Kwangchow Wan was leased by China to France for 99 years (or until 1997, as the British did in Hong Kong's New Territories and the Germans did with Kiautschou Bay), according to the Treaty of 12 April 1898, on 27 May as Territoire de Kouang-Tchéou-Wan, to counter the growing commercial power of British Hong Kong and was effectively placed under the authority of the French Resident Superior in Tonkin (itself under the Governor General of French Indochina, also in Hanoi); the French Resident was represented locally by Administrators.

=== 20th century ===
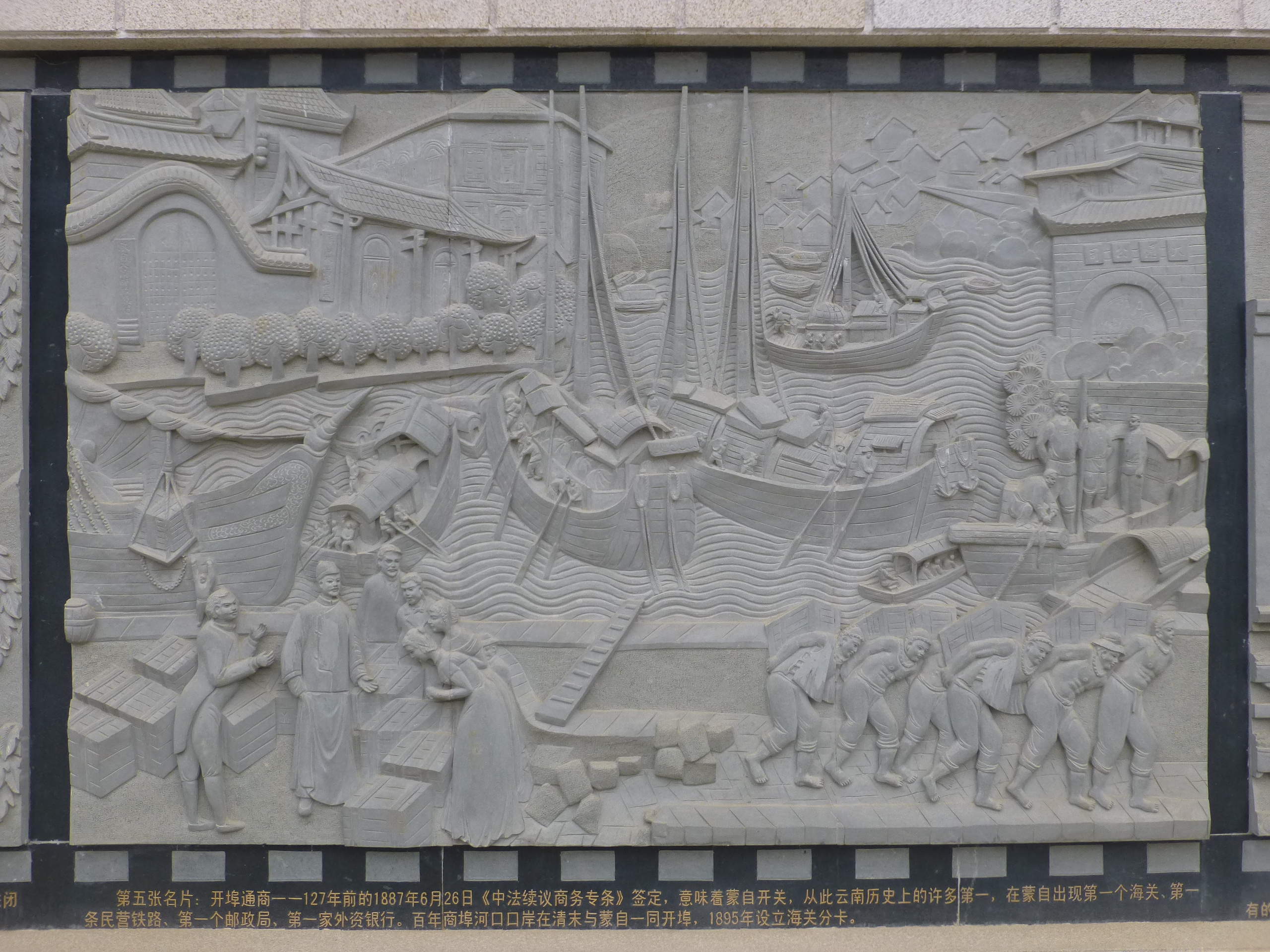
The opening of Sino-French trade in Yunnan after the signing of the bilateral commercial agreement in 1887. (A modern artist's rendering)

In 1900, France was a major participant in the Eight-Nation Alliance which invaded China during the late Qing dynasty period to put down the Boxer Rebellion. In the early 20th century Chinese students began to come to France. Li Shizeng, Zhang Renjie, Wu Zhihui, and Cai Yuanpei formed an anarchist group which became the basis for the Diligent Work-Frugal Study Movement. Zhang started a gallery which imported Chinese art, and the dealer C.T. Loo developed his Paris gallery into an international center.

In 1905-1907, Japan made overtures on China to enlarge its sphere of influence to include Fujian. Japan was trying to obtain French loans and also avoid the Open Door Policy. Paris provided loans on condition that Japan respect the Open Door and not violate China's territorial integrity. In the French-Japanese Entente of 1907, Paris secured Japan's recognition of the special interests France possessed in “the regions of the Chinese Empire adjacent to the territories” where they had “the rights of sovereignty, protection or occupation,” which meant the French colonial possessions in southeast Asia as well as the French spheres of influence in three provinces in southern China—Yunnan, Guangxi, and Guangdong. In return, the French recognized Japan's spheres of influence in Korea, South Manchuria, and Inner Mongolia.

The French Third Republic recognized the establishment of the Republic of China and established diplomatic relations on 7 October 1913. After the outbreak of World War I, the French government recruited Chinese workers to work in French factories. Li Shizeng and his friends organized the Société Franco-Chinoise d'Education (華法教育會 HuaFa jiaoyuhui) in 1916. Many worker-students who came to France after the war became high level members of the Chinese Communist Party (CCP). These included Zhou Enlai and Deng Xiaoping.

In 1915–1916, as political and diplomatic dispute, the Laoxikai Affair, arose between France and the Republic of China. It developed out of an attempt by the French consulate to expand France's extraterritorial power in Tianjin outside of the French concession and into the adjacent Laoxikai district where a Catholic Cathedral had recently been built. On 20 October 1916, French police arrested nine Chinese police officers. Chinese residents in Tianjin responded by rioting. The Chinese government protested the arrests, and the French released the Chinese police officers and issued an apology.

The Institut Franco-Chinois de Lyon (1921–1951) promoted cultural exchanges.

In 1909, China sent an expedition to the Paracel Islands, for the first time formally claiming them. In 1932, China sent a note verbale to France, declaring that China's southernmost territory was the Paracels. In 1933, when France occupied six features in the Spratlys, China did not protest.

During World War II, Free France and China fought as allied powers against the Axis powers of Germany, Italy and Japan. After the invasion of France in 1940, although the newly formed Vichy France was an ally of Germany, it continued to recognize the Kuomintang government of Chiang Kai-shek—which had to flee to Chongqing in the Chinese interior after the fall of Nanjing in 1937—rather than the Japanese-sponsored Reorganized National Government of China under Wang Jingwei. French diplomats in China remained accredited to the government in Chongqing. In 1943, China again reiterated through its government-published book, China Handbook (1937–1943), that its southernmost territory was the Paracels, specifically Triton Island.

On 18 August 1945 in Chongqing, while the Japanese were still occupying Kwangchow Wan following the surrender, a French diplomat from the Provisional Government and Kuo Chang Wu, Vice-Minister of Foreign Affairs of the Republic of China, signed the Convention between the Provisional Government of the French Republic and the National Government of China for the retrocession of the Leased Territory of Kouang-Tchéou-Wan. Almost immediately after the last Japanese occupation troops had left the territory in late September, representatives of the French and the Chinese governments went to Fort-Bayard to proceed to the transfer of authority; the French flag was lowered for the last time on 20 November 1945.

France played a minor role in the Korean War. In the 1950s, communist insurgents based in China repeatedly invaded and attacked French facilities in Indochina. After a major defeat by the Vietnamese communists at Dien Bien Phu in 1954, France pulled out and turned North Vietnam over to the Communists. By exiting Southeast Asia, France avoided confrontations with China. However, the Cultural Revolution sparked violence against French diplomats in China, and relationships cooled. The powerful French Communist Party generally supported the Soviet Union in the Sino-Soviet split and China had therefore a very weak base of support inside France, apart from some militant students.

During the Suez Crisis in 1956, China condemned France and Britain and made strong statements in support of Egypt.

=== Cold War relations ===
After the Chinese Civil War (1927–1950) and the establishment of the new communist-led People's Republic of China (PRC) on 1 October 1949, the French Fourth Republic government did not recognize the PRC. Instead, France maintained relations with the Republic of China on Taiwan. During the Korean War, the French Battalion under the United Nations Command fought the PRC's People's Volunteer Army in multiple battles.

By 1964, France and the PRC had re-established ambassadorial-level diplomatic relations. This was precipitated by Charles de Gaulle's official recognition of the PRC. De Gaulle's view was that maintaining diplomatic contact with the PRC could be a moderating influence.

=== Post-Cold War ===
This state of relations would not last, however. During the 1990s, France and the PRC repeatedly clashed as a result of the PRC's One China Policy. France sold weapons to Taiwan, angering the Beijing government. This resulted in the temporary closure of the French Consulate-General in Guangzhou. France eventually agreed to prohibit local companies from selling arms to Taiwan, and diplomatic relations resumed in 1994. Since then, the two countries have exchanged a number of state visits. Bilateral trade reached new high levels in 2000. Cultural ties between the two countries are less well represented, though France is making an effort to improve this disparity. France has expanded its research facilities dealing with Chinese history, culture, and current affairs. Organizations associated with the International Department of the Chinese Communist Party maintain links with French parliamentarians. The PRC operates over 70 talent recruitment "work stations" in France for technology transfer purposes.

In 2008, Sino-French relations took a downturn in the wake of the 2008 Summer Olympics torch relay. As torchbearers passed through Paris, activists fighting for Tibetan independence and human rights repeatedly attempted to disrupt, hinder or halt the procession. The Chinese government hinted that Sino-French friendship could be affected while Chinese protesters organized boycotts of the French-owned retail chain Carrefour in major Chinese cities including Kunming, Hefei and Wuhan. Hundreds of people also joined anti-French rallies in those cities and Beijing. Both governments attempted to calm relations after the demonstrations. French President Nicolas Sarkozy wrote a letter of support and sympathy to Jin Jing, a Chinese athlete who had carried the Olympic torch. CCP general secretary Hu Jintao subsequently sent a special envoy to France to help strengthen relations.

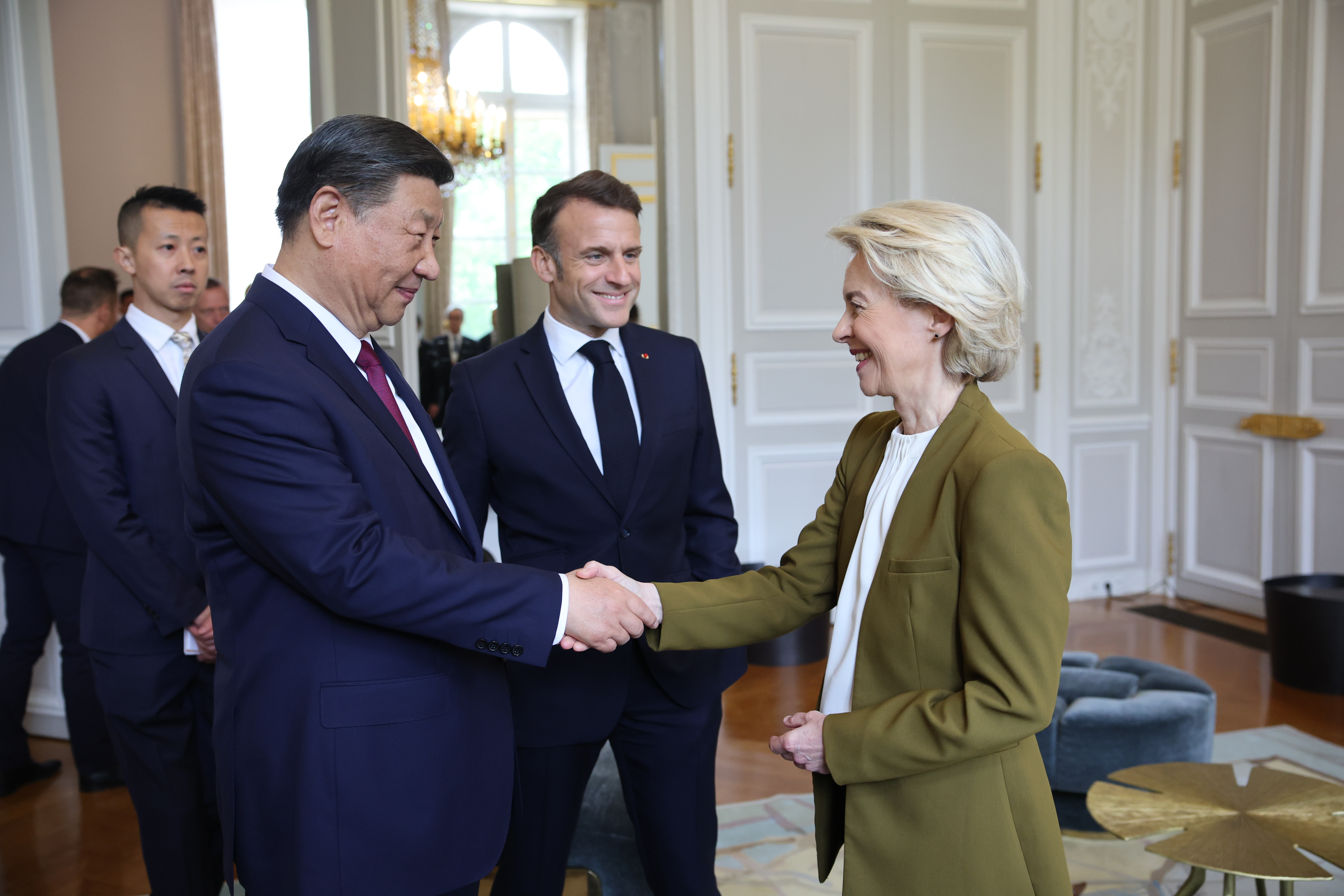
French President Emmanuel Macron, European Commission President Ursula von der Leyen, and Chinese leader Xi Jinping at the Elysee Palace in Paris during Xi's state visit to France, 6 May 2024

However, relations again soured after President Sarkozy met the Dalai Lama in Poland in 2009. Chinese Premier Wen Jiabao omitted France in his tour of Europe in response, his assistant foreign minister saying of the rift "The one who tied the knot should be the one who unties it." French Prime Minister Jean-Pierre Raffarin was quoted in Le Monde as saying that France had no intention of "encourag[ing] Tibetan separatism".

In June 2020, France opposed the Hong Kong national security law.

In December 2020, France said it would oppose the proposed Comprehensive Agreement on Investment between the European Union and China over the use of forced labour of Uyghurs.

In March 2021, European Union leaders imposed sanctions on various Chinese Communist Party officials. China responded by sanctioning various French politicians such as Raphael Glucksmann.

At the 2024 Washington summit, France, alongside other NATO allies, explicitly condemned China as a "decisive enabler" of Russia's war against Ukraine due to its large-scale support for Russia's defense industrial base.

In March 2025, Reporters Without Borders condemned a smear campaign amplified by Chinese state media against French journalists investigating a sportswear company, Decathlon, alleged to use Uyghur forced labor.

Chinese authorities have attempted to pressure two Uyghur activists in Paris, including by coercing one to spy on the Uyghur community, highlighting Beijing's growing use of transnational repression. Human Rights Watch called on French authorities to investigate and protect Uyghurs from such intimidation. The incidents follow a pattern of harassment targeting Uyghur activists abroad. France has been urged to adopt stronger measures to counter these abuses, especially during its G7 presidency.

== Espionage ==
In March 2024, the head of the Paris office of China's Ministry of State Security (MSS) and other Chinese officials were filmed in Charles de Gaulle Airport in a failed attempt to forcibly repatriate Chinese dissident Ling Huazhan. French authorities subsequently asked the MSS officer and another Chinese intelligence official to leave the country.

In May 2024, several French lawmakers, all belonging to the Inter-Parliamentary Alliance on China, stated that they had been targeted by Chinese spies (APT31). In June 2025, French authorities suspended the deportation of a Chinese businessman that the General Directorate for Internal Security (DGSI) suspected of operating a secret police station from within a Fujian hometown association. In February 2026, French authorities arrested four Chinese nationals in France on suspicion of spying as part of an attempt to gain access to Starlink. In June 2026, it was reported that French counterintelligence services had dismantled nine clandestine stations operating under China's Ministry of Public Security used to spy on dissidents.

== Economic issues ==
At a time when China–U.S. economic relations were deeply troubled, with a trade war underway, French President Emmanuel Macron and CCP general secretary Xi Jinping signed a series of large-scale trade agreements in late March 2019 which covered many sectors over a period of years. The centerpiece was a €30 billion purchase of airplanes from Airbus. It came at a time when the leading American firm, Boeing, saw its entire fleet of new 737 MAX passenger planes grounded worldwide. Going well beyond aviation, the new trade agreement covered French exports of chicken, a French-built offshore wind farm in China, and a Franco-Chinese cooperation fund, as well as billions of Euros of co-financing between BNP Paribas and the Bank of China. Other plans included billions of euros to be spent on modernizing Chinese factories, as well as new ship building.

During his speech at the World Economic Forum in Davos on 20 January 2026, French President Macron emphasized the importance of increasing Chinese foreign direct investment (FDI) in key European sectors to promote economic growth and facilitate technology transfer. He urged China to move beyond simply exporting products to Europe and instead focus on local manufacturing and physical presence on the continent.

== Taiwan ==
Per its one China policy, France recognizes the People's Republic of China as the sole government of China and Taiwan as an integral part of Chinese territory.

France has routinely undertaken freedom of navigation transits through the Taiwan Strait. In April 2019, China accused France of illegally sailing a naval vessel through the Taiwan Strait. In May 2020, France dismissed China's warning to not sell equipment to Taiwan in order to upgrade six La Fayette-class frigates that it sold the Taiwanese navy in 1991.

During an April 2023 visit to China, French President Emmanuel Macron called for Europe to reduce its dependence on the US and avoid being drawn into a confrontation between the US and China over Taiwan, as part of his view of strategic autonomy. Macron also stated that he favors the "status quo" on cross-strait relations with Taiwan.

== Public opinion ==
According to a 2019 survey by Kantar Public for the Institut Montaigne, French citizens are increasingly aware of China's rise as a global power, though opinions vary by topic.

On perceived threat, 31% of respondents viewed China as a threat, compared with 35% for the United States and 44% for Russia. 81% considered China influential in global affairs and 47% thought China was influential in France, with 13% describing it as "very influential". When it came to digitalization and technology, a generational divide is apparent in French perceptions of China's technological development, with younger citizens, particularly those under 35, more likely to view China as surpassing France in these fields. Among respondents under age of 35, 55% considered China as being ahead, with 65.2% of those aged 18 to 24 sharing this view. Overall, 47% believed China was ahead of France, while 19% believed France was ahead and 29% viewed neither as ahead.

During COVID-19, a survey published in 2020 by the Pew Research Center found that 70% of French had an unfavourable view of China in that year. It also reported in that year that 48% in France regarded China as the "world's dominant economic power", compared with 34% for USA.

A survey published in 2026 by the Pew Research Center found that 58% of French people had an unfavorable view of China, while 36% had a favorable view. It also found that 51% of French people in the 18–35 age group had positive opinions of China.

== Tourism ==
A 2014 poll indicated that Chinese tourists considered France to be the most welcoming nation in Europe.

In 2017, approximately two million Chinese tourists spent an average of €3,400 per person in France. A 2019 survey conducted by Kantar Public for the think tank Institut Montaigne found that French respondents positively recognize the economic benefits of Chinese tourism. In Paris, 84% view Chinese tourism positively; and, in France overall, 78% see Chinese tourism positively.

== Resident diplomatic missions ==
of China in France

- Paris (Embassy)
- Lyon (Consulate-General)
- Marseille (Consulate-General)
- Papeete, French Polynesia (Consulate-General)
- Saint-Denis, Réunion (Consulate-General)
- Strasbourg (Consulate-General)

of France in China

- Beijing (Embassy)
- Chengdu (Consulate-General)
- Guangzhou (Consulate-General)
- Hong Kong (Consulate-General)
- Shanghai (Consulate-General)
- Shenyang (Consulate-General)
- Wuhan (Consulate-General)

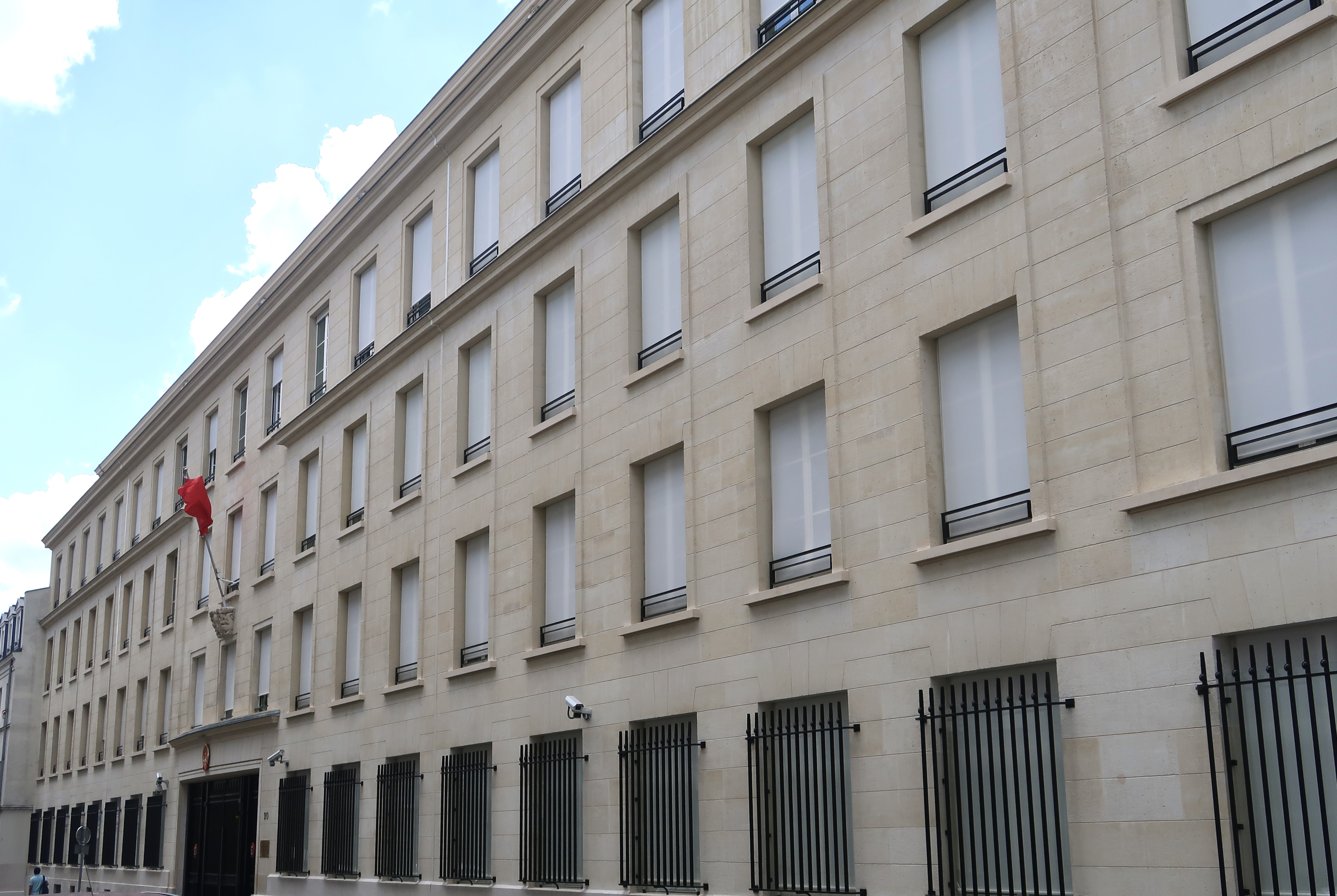
Embassy of China in Paris

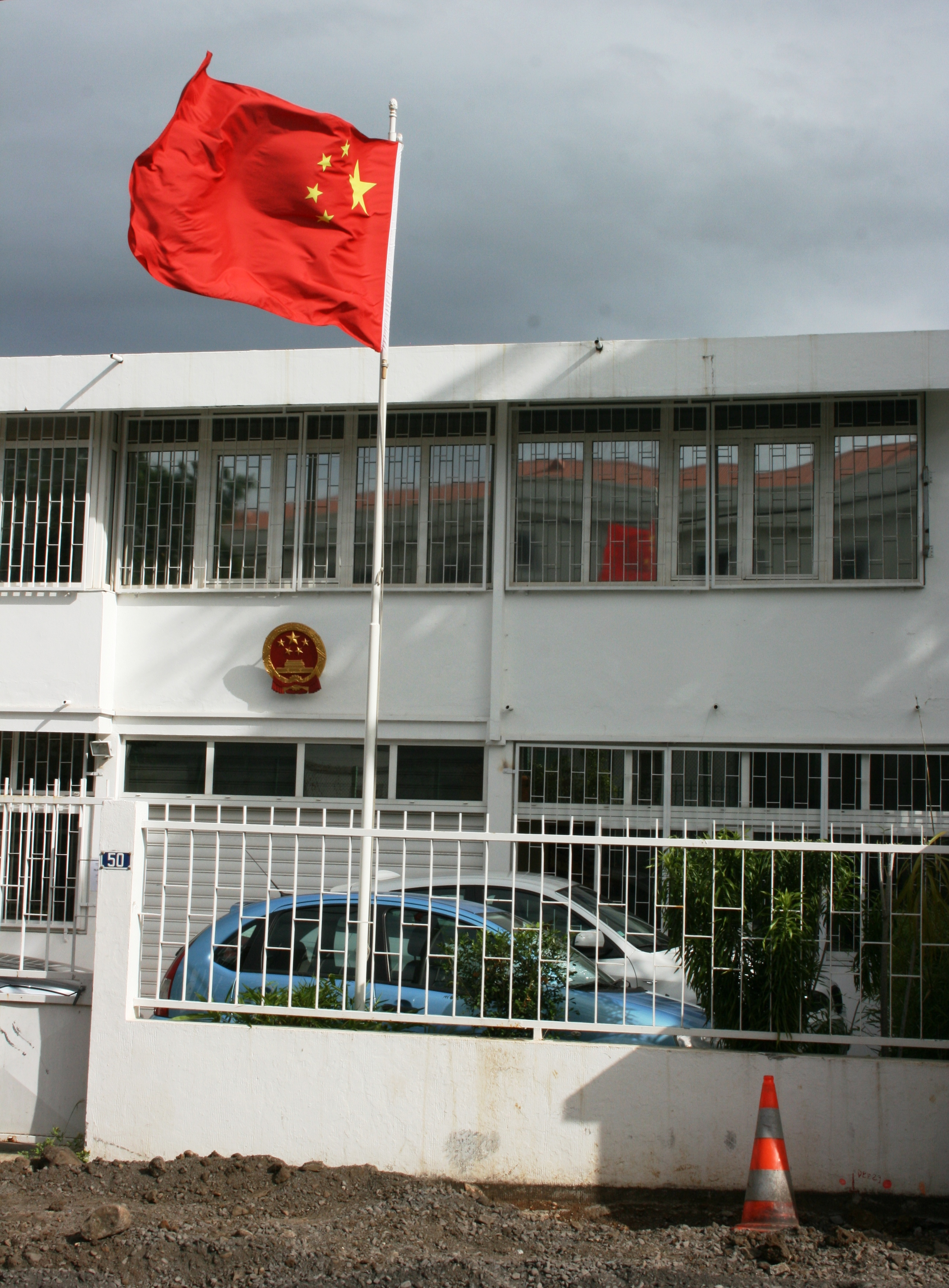
Consulate-General of China in Saint-Denis, Réunion

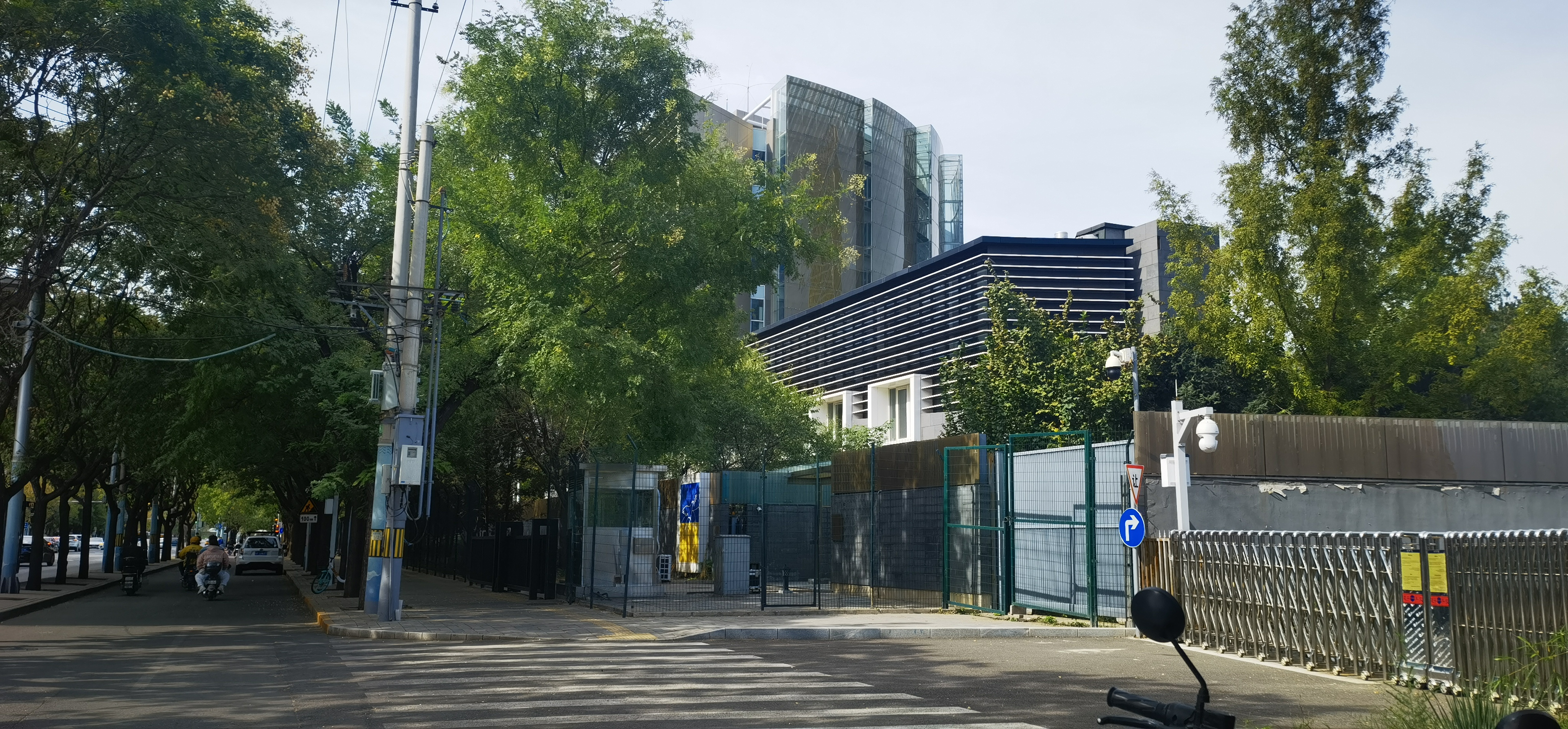
Embassy of France in Beijing

== Education ==
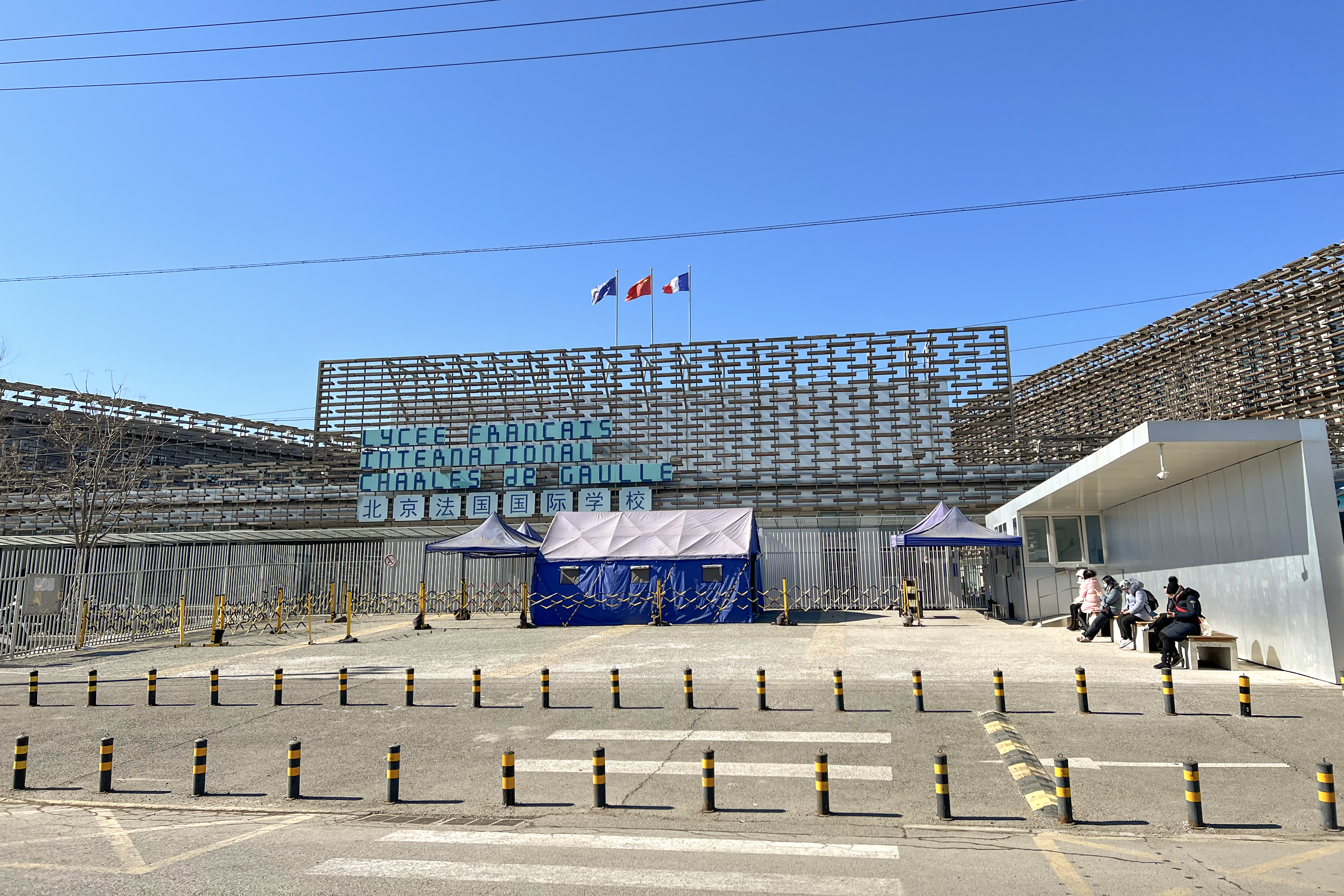
Lycée Français International Charles de Gaulle de Pékin

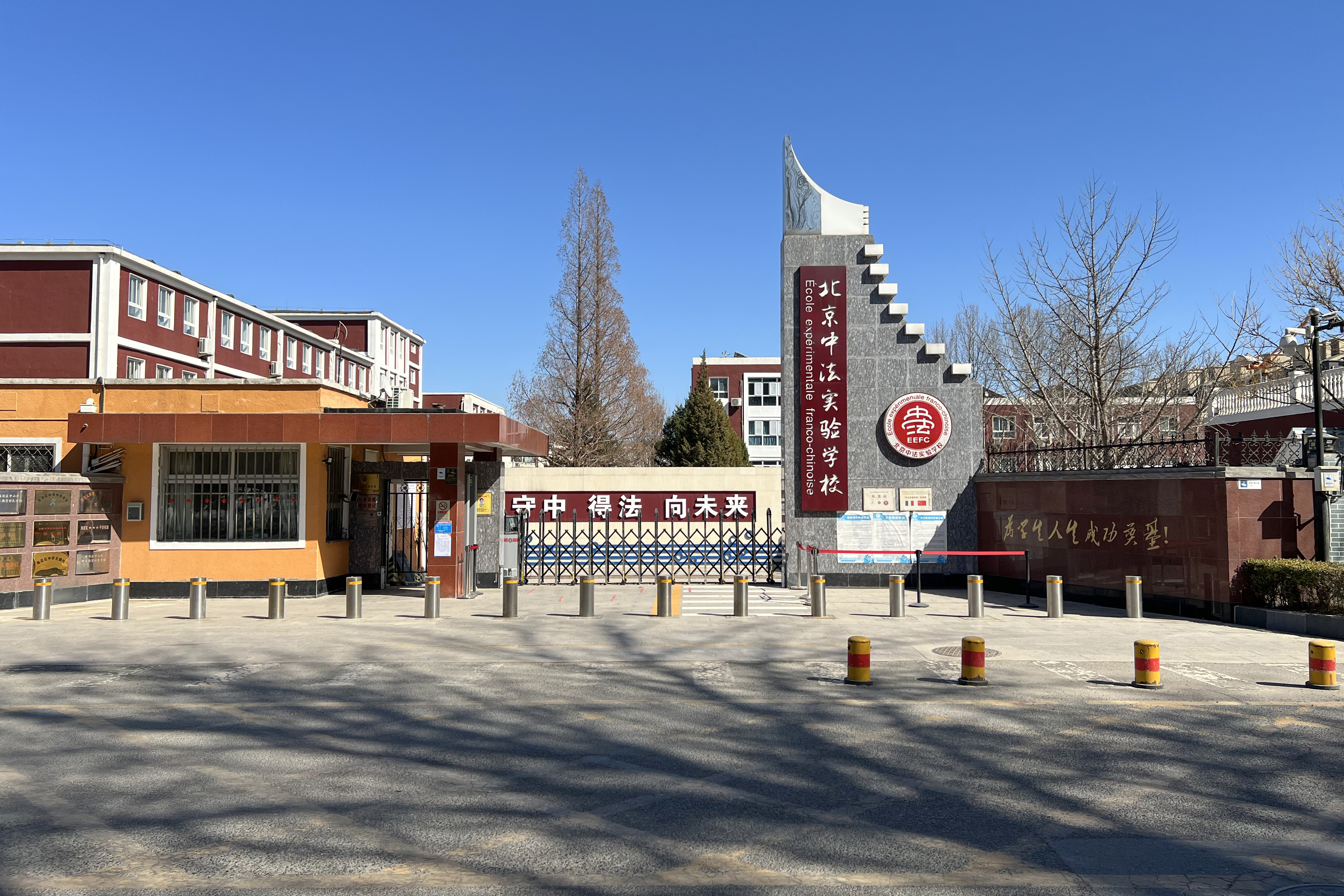
École expérimentale franco-chinoise de Pékin

French international schools in mainland China, all partnered in some way with the Agency for French Education Abroad (AEFE), include:

- Lycée Français International Charles de Gaulle de Pékin (Beijing)
- Lycée Français de Shanghai
- Wuhan French International School
- École Française Internationale de Canton (Guangzhou)
- École Française Internationale de Shenzhen

Shekou International School in Shenzhen formerly was AEFE-partnered, with a section for primary school students using the French system.

There is also a French international school in Hong Kong: French International School of Hong Kong.

There is also a bilingual Chinese-French school aimed at Chinese children, École expérimentale franco-chinoise de Pékin (北京中法实验学校), which is converted from the former Wenquan No. 2 Middle School, in Haidian District, Beijing.

== See also ==
- Kwang-Chou-Wan
- China–European Union relations
- History of Chinese foreign policy
- Foreign relations of China
  - Foreign relations of imperial China
- China Policy Institute
- Historical Museum of French-Chinese Friendship
- Chinese diaspora in France
