= Zhenping County, Shaanxi =

Zhenping County 镇坪县 Chenping
- County
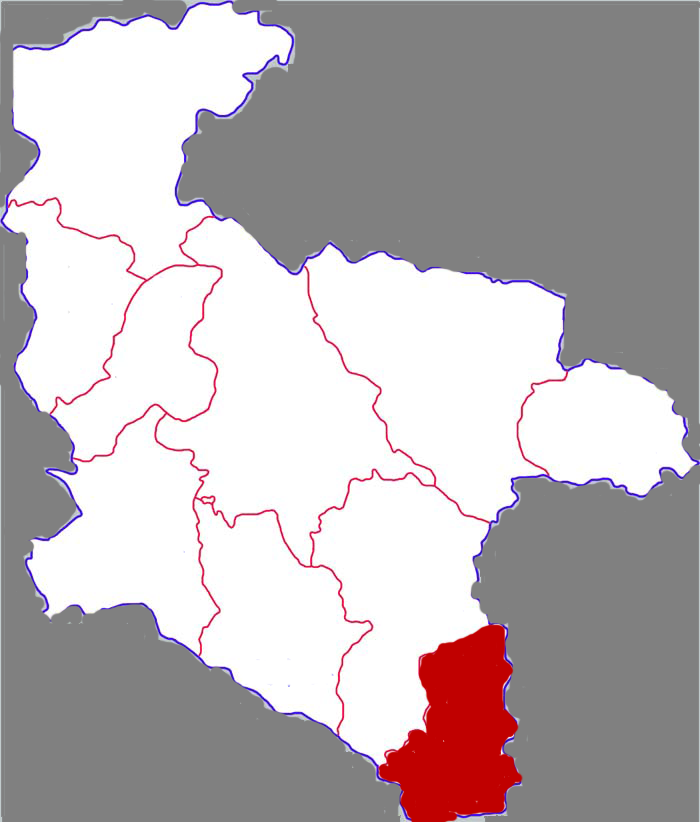
- Zhenping in Ankang

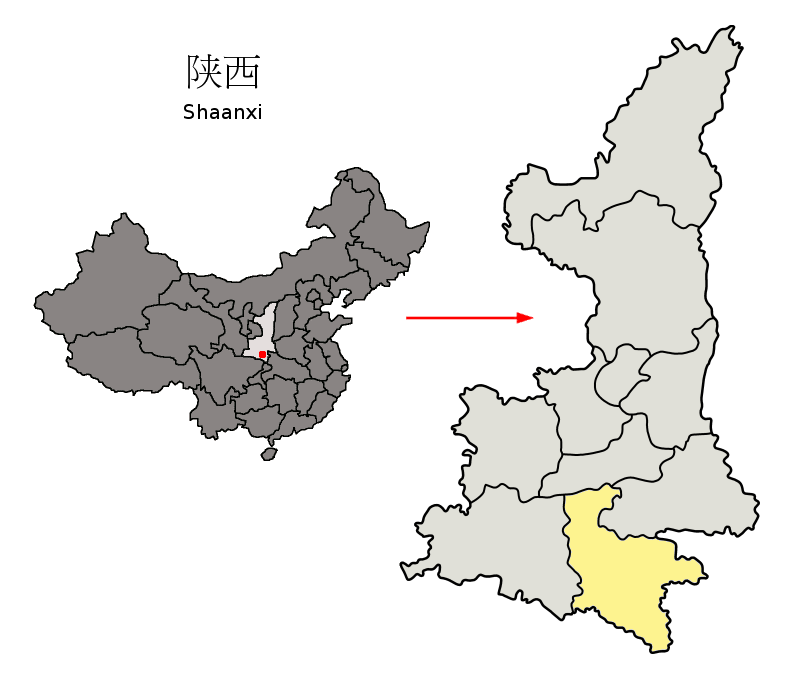
- Ankang in Shaanxi
- Coordinates: 31°53′02″N 109°31′37″E
- Country: People's Republic of China
- Province: Shaanxi
- Prefecture-level city: Ankang

Area
  - Total: 1,503.26 km^{2} (580.41 sq mi)
- Elevation: 930 m (3,050 ft)
- Highest elevation (Hualongshan): 2,917.2 m (9,571 ft)
- Lowest elevation (Yangxikou, Hongshi township): 500 m (1,600 ft)

Population (2020)
  - Total: 58,651
  - Density: 39.016/km^{2} (101.05/sq mi)
- Time zone: UTC+8 (China standard time)
- Postal code: 725600
- Licence plates: 陕G
- Website: www.zhp.gov.cn

Zhenping County (simplified Chinese: 镇坪县; traditional Chinese: 鎮坪縣; pinyin: Zhènpíng Xiàn) is a county in the south of Shaanxi province, China, and is the southernmost county-level division of the province. It is under the administration of the prefecture-level city of Ankang. In 2020 it had a population of 58,651.

It has a humid subtropical climate and mountainous landscape.

== Administrative divisions ==
As of 2019, Zhenping County is divided to 7 towns.

Towns

- Chengguan (城关镇)
- Cengjia (曾家镇)
- Niutoudian (牛头店镇)
- Zhongbao (钟宝镇)
- Shangzhu (上竹镇)
- Huaping (华坪镇)
- Shuping (曙坪镇)

== Climate ==
Climate data for Zhenping, elevation 996 m (3,268 ft), (1991–2020 normals, extremes 1981–present)
Month	Jan	Feb	Mar	Apr	May	Jun	Jul	Aug	Sep	Oct	Nov	Dec	Year
Record high °C (°F)	20.2 (68.4)	25.0 (77.0)	32.4 (90.3)	33.4 (92.1)	34.3 (93.7)	35.8 (96.4)	35.7 (96.3)	36.6 (97.9)	36.1 (97.0)	29.1 (84.4)	24.7 (76.5)	20.5 (68.9)	36.6 (97.9)
Mean daily maximum °C (°F)	6.6 (43.9)	9.3 (48.7)	14.1 (57.4)	19.9 (67.8)	22.9 (73.2)	26.2 (79.2)	28.5 (83.3)	27.9 (82.2)	23.1 (73.6)	18.2 (64.8)	13.6 (56.5)	8.4 (47.1)	18.2 (64.8)
Daily mean °C (°F)	1.5 (34.7)	3.9 (39.0)	8.0 (46.4)	13.3 (55.9)	16.6 (61.9)	20.1 (68.2)	22.6 (72.7)	21.9 (71.4)	17.7 (63.9)	12.8 (55.0)	7.9 (46.2)	3.0 (37.4)	12.4 (54.4)
Mean daily minimum °C (°F)	−2.0 (28.4)	0.1 (32.2)	3.6 (38.5)	8.5 (47.3)	12.2 (54.0)	15.9 (60.6)	18.8 (65.8)	18.2 (64.8)	14.4 (57.9)	9.5 (49.1)	4.1 (39.4)	−0.6 (30.9)	8.6 (47.4)
Record low °C (°F)	−11.1 (12.0)	−8.2 (17.2)	−6.4 (20.5)	−0.8 (30.6)	3.8 (38.8)	8.0 (46.4)	11.2 (52.2)	11.4 (52.5)	6.1 (43.0)	−3.4 (25.9)	−5.3 (22.5)	−15.4 (4.3)	−15.4 (4.3)
Average precipitation mm (inches)	11.8 (0.46)	19.4 (0.76)	45.4 (1.79)	81.5 (3.21)	125.5 (4.94)	161.6 (6.36)	172.7 (6.80)	150.8 (5.94)	131.8 (5.19)	92.6 (3.65)	37.5 (1.48)	12.9 (0.51)	1,043.5 (41.09)
Average precipitation days (≥ 0.1 mm)	8.7	9.1	11.7	13.0	15.0	14.3	15.3	13.9	13.8	13.0	9.1	8.3	145.2
Average snowy days	9.8	7.0	3.5	0.4	0	0	0	0	0	0.1	1.3	6.3	28.4
Average relative humidity (%)	69	69	68	69	75	78	81	81	82	81	75	71	75
Mean monthly sunshine hours	97.3	88.4	116.0	140.7	147.1	153.9	179.2	185.5	119.1	104.8	103.4	103.2	1,538.6
Percentage possible sunshine	30	28	31	36	34	36	42	45	33	30	33	33	34
Source: China Meteorological Administration

== See also ==
- Forced abortion of Feng Jianmei
