= Shanghai National Party =

US-based political organization

Shanghai National Party 上海民族党
- Chairperson: Ma Zhao
- Founder: He Anquan
- Founded: July 18, 2018
- Headquarters: New York City
- Ideology: Shanghainese nationalism; Localism; Separatism; Anti-communism

Party flag

Website
- shanghainationalparty.com

The Shanghai National Party (Chinese: 上海民族党; pinyin: Shànghǎi mínzú dǎng) is a US-based political organization advocating for Shanghai's independence. The organization was established on July 18, 2018, by He Anquan and Wang Limin in New York City. The party's flag was inspired by that of the Shanghai International Settlement.

== Founder ==
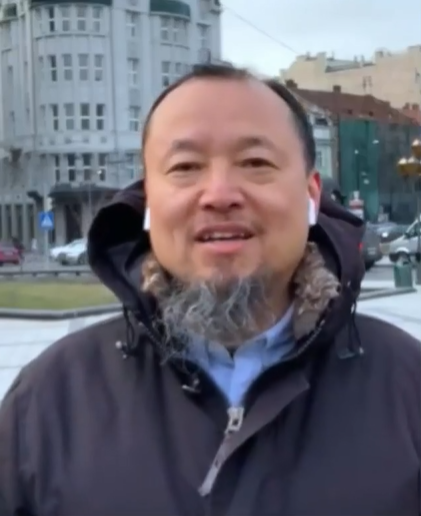
He Anquan

The party's founder, He Anquan (何岸泉) was born in Shanghai. His birth name was Zhang Min. His grandmother died in the Chinese Civil War, and his grandfather died during the Cultural Revolution. He moved to the United States after the Tiananmen square massacre and became a citizen in 2010.

== Movement ==
On August 10, 2018, a party advertisement appeared in the North American Daily. On August 29, the party issued an "emergency statement", claiming party member Hu Chenyi was arrested and sentenced to death via electric chair upon return to Shanghai. Later that year, the party was registered as a nonprofit organization in New York. The party has since organized multiple anti-Beijing demonstrations in Chinatown, Queens along with Uyghurs and activists from Xinjiang, Taiwan, Hong Kong, the Falun Gong. Yi Lixia, the vice president of the Uyghur American Association (UAA), donated $1 million to the party in support.

In August 2019, the party hosted the "Anti-Communist Independence Movement Convention" with the UAA at Capitol Hill.

On June 18, 2020, the party hosted the "Acceleration of Chinese Collapse" award ceremony at Times Square using performance art to mock CCP General Secretary Xi Jinping. During the event, He said, "Dictatorship will not make China strong again, it will only make China collapse quicker."

After former president of Taiwan Lee Teng-hui's death in July 2020, He released a video in memory. In the video, the sign of the Taiwan consulate at New York City was changed to "Republic of China embassy at New York City." The Taiwanese Ministry of Foreign Affairs responded by clarifying in a press release that the sign was photoshopped. In November of that year, He started a fundraiser for Hong Kong nationalists who fled after the passing of its National Security Law.

He visited Ukraine after the start of the Russian invasion of Ukraine.

During the Shanghai lockdown in 2022, He claimed that the quarantine methods constituted an attempted genocide of Shanghainese citizens. Members of the party organized a hunger strike at the Chinese consulate in April.

== See also ==
- Hong Kong Localist camp
- Local ethnic nationalism
