= Zhang Kai (lawyer) =

Zhang Kai (Chinese: 张凯; pinyin: Zhāng Kǎi) is a human rights lawyer known for defending churches in China that were being forced to remove their crosses and crucifixes. He is also known for representing or campaigning on behalf of the disadvantaged, such as Feng Jianmei, a woman forced by government authorities to have an abortion in 2012.

== Arrest and detention ==
Zhang was detained on 25 August 2015 in Wenzhou, Zhejiang Province, a city with a strong Christian influence. He had been representing churches whose crosses were demolished by government officials, and was also accused of ‘masterminding illegal religious gatherings’. He was charged with “endangering state secrets” and “gathering a crowd to disturb public order” and placed in criminal detention.

Along with a group of religious leaders, Zhang had been scheduled to meet US envoy for religious freedom, David Saperstein, the following day.

Officials in the province have been waging a campaign to remove crosses from more than 1,200 churches and other buildings. Communist Party general secretary Xi Jinping was once the Party Committee Secretary of the province. Since coming to power in 2012 Xi’s strict political regime has clamped down on human rights lawyers, liberal academics, journalists, bloggers and feminist campaigners.

Rights groups say the campaign has affected hundreds of parishes.

Zhang, like many of China's human rights lawyers, is a Christian, and earlier in 2015 had posted an online essay denouncing the Communist party’s treatment of Chinese churchgoers.

Zhang made a televised confession, which was rejected by his supporters. Zhang Lei, a fellow human rights lawyer, said “it is utterly appalling for a person to be made to confess on the television”.

== Release ==
Zhang was released on 23 March 2016. He posted a message on WeChat confirming his release, and that he was back in his hometown in Inner Mongolia.

== Lawyers and activists detained in China ==
Other people detained by the authorities include lawyers Wang Yu, Zhou Shifeng, Li Shuyun and Xie Yanyi; as well as Li Heping and his two assistants, Zhao Wei and Gao Yue; another legal assistant, Liu Sixin; and activists Hu Shigen and Gou Hongguo.

In June 2016, there were reports in the South China Morning Post that Zhao Wei had been released after apparently 'confessing' – however these reports have not been confirmed. Her husband also believes that she may have been forced to recant, and disputed the authenticity of statements on her Sina Weibo social media account.
