= Mop.com =

Chinese bulletin board system

MOP
- Available in: Chinese (Some parts are in English)
- Type: Forum
- Website: www.mop.com

MOP (Chinese: 猫扑) is a Chinese bulletin board system (BBS). Though popular in China, it is often a source of controversy. The site was created in October 1997. There are 28 million users on MOP. In the past, Mop has been called Mop Station (猫扑大客栈) and Mop Planet (猫扑大星球).

== History ==
Mop.com was created by Zhe Tian, who went by the moniker "Mop". He stepped down from his administrative positions in 2002 following a series of large updates that were carried out on the website.

Originally created for the discussion of console games, the website expanded to cover PC games after receiving requests for it.

Mop has created several Chinese Internet slang, such as YY (yì yín (意淫), fantasizing), 233 (laughing out loud, Mop's 233rd emoji was a laughing emoji) and Orz (a bowing position), among others.

In 2005, Mop.com acquired IT news website DoNews.

== Exposure of Internet Regulation Operation ==
On January 5, 2009, Mop's section "Beautiful Ladies" was reported to the China Internet Illegal Information Reporting Centre. On January 8, 2009, Mop.com was listed by the Chinese government on "websites for further improvement and rectification."

== See also ==
- Tianya Club
