= China–European Union relations =

- China: European Union

In 1975, the People's Republic of China established bilateral relations with the European Community, which later became the European Union. China is the EU's second largest trade partner after the United States, and the EU is China's second largest trading partner after ASEAN.

Since March 2019, the European Union has referred to China as "a cooperation partner…, a negotiating partner…, an economic competitor…, and a systemic rival". The EU has put an arms embargo and numerous anti-dumping measures against the PRC in place. The EU has become increasingly critical of the PRC for its support of Russia in its invasion of Ukraine.

== Framework initiatives ==
Relations are governed by the 1985 EU-China Trade and Cooperation Agreement. Since 2007, negotiations have been underway to upgrade this to a new European Union Association Agreement and there are already 24 sectoral dialogues and agreements from environmental protection to education.

The EU-China 2020 Strategic Agenda for Cooperation, adopted in 2013, calls for cooperation in the areas of "peace, prosperity, sustainable development and people-to-people exchanges." In the document, the EU reaffirmed its respect for China's sovereignty and territorial integrity, while the PRC reaffirmed its support to EU integration. In 2016, the EU adopted the "Joint Communication on elements for a new EU strategy on China" as its strategy on China. An annual EU–China Summit is held each year to discuss political and economic relations as well as global and regional issues.

=== Science and technology ===
China and the EU launched their first science and technology cooperation program in 1983. They also drafted an Agreement on Scientific and Technological Cooperation in 1998 which was renewed in 2004 with the aim of linking research organisations, industry, universities and individual researchers in specific projects supported by the EU budget.

Cooperation between the EU and China in the area of science and technology was facilitated by the Horizon 2020 program, addressing the following areas: (i) food, agriculture and biotechnology (FAB); (ii) sustainable urbanization; (iii) energy; (iv) aeronautics; (v) and other areas including ICT, water, health, society, polar research, sme instrument, and space.

=== Comprehensive Agreement on Investment ===
The EU–China Comprehensive Agreement on Investment (CAI) has been under negotiation since 2014. DG Trade Phil Hogan in the Von der Leyen Commission promised during his September 2019 confirmation hearings that he would seek to complete the negotiations by the end of 2020. In December 2020, the European Union and China announced that they reached an investment deal that was first launched in 2013, referred to as the Comprehensive Agreement on Investment (CAI). In March 2021, it was reported that there would be serious doubts about the approval of the deal in the European Parliament given the PRC's sanctions against members of the parliament, the European Council's Political and Security Committee, and European think tanks. In May 2021, the European Commission announced plans to reduce dependence on the PRC in strategic areas of the economy. The same month, the European Parliament froze ratification of the CAI.

In 2020 and 2021, the Comprehensive Agreement on Investment drew a "firestorm of criticism" from US politicians and political commentators, who complained that the EU had not consulted the US before agreeing to the deal. However, as the US itself had signed a trade agreement with China a year prior without first having consulted the EU, the criticism was largely dismissed as being "hypocritical". Additionally, the Biden administration has claimed that the US will be "at the head of the table again", which some analysts say might be viewed as a threat towards the EU's goal of strategic autonomy from the US by implying that the European Union "[should] play second-fiddle to Washington".

== History ==
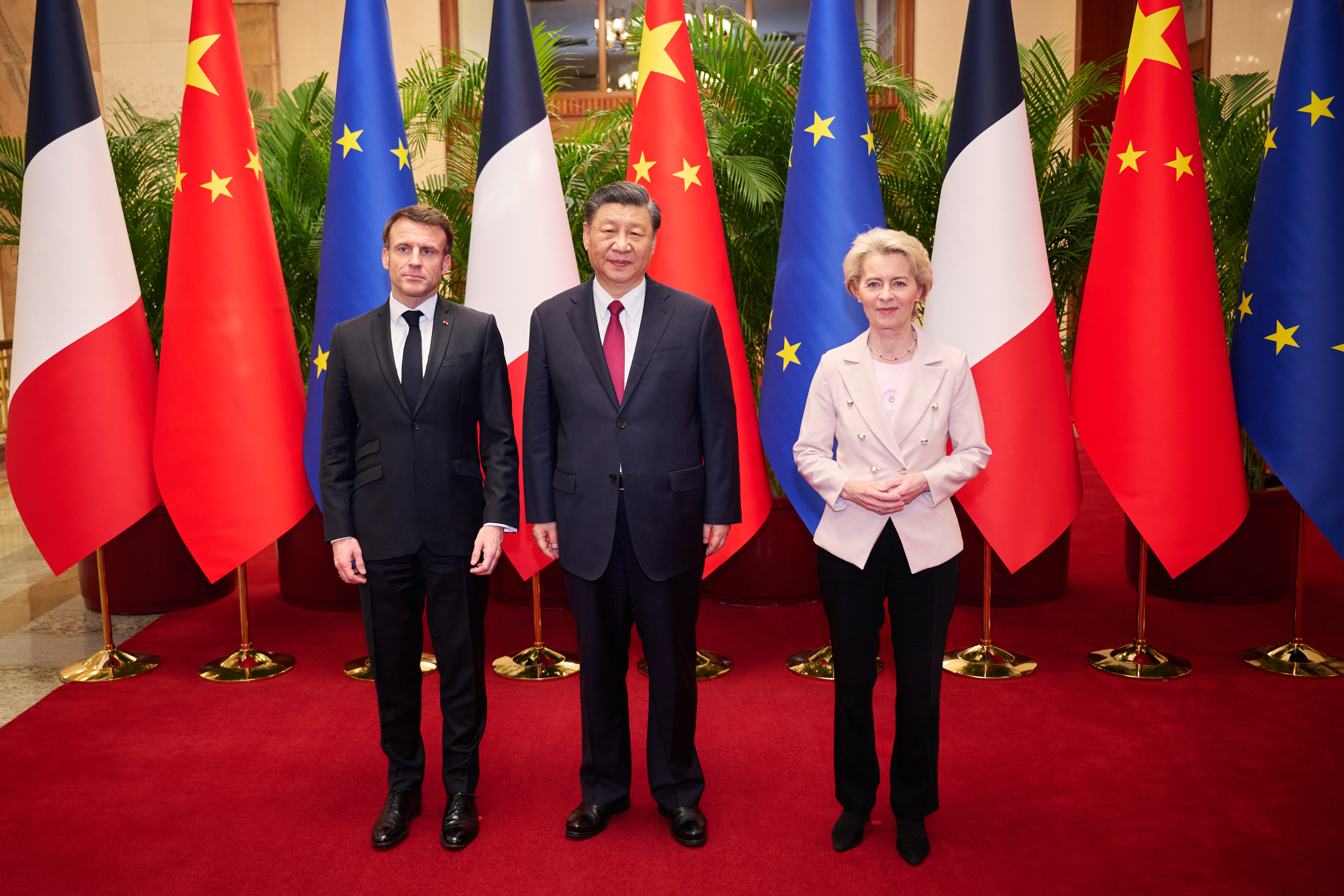
European Commission President Ursula von der Leyen, French President Emmanuel Macron and Chinese leader Xi Jinping in Beijing, China, 6 April 2023

Prior to the existence of the European Community, many European states had relations with the Ming dynasty as early as the 16th century. The most important relationship, apart from Britain-China connected China with France and Germany.

In 1979, just after the first direct elections to the European Parliament, the later institution established the "Delegation for relations with the People's Republic of China" (D-CN).

After the end of the Cold War in 1990, relations with Europe were not as important as its relations with the US, Japan and other Asian powers. However interest in closer relations started to rise as economic contacts increased and interest in a multipolar system grew. Although initially imposing an arms embargo on China after the 1989 Tiananmen Square protests and massacre (see #Arms embargo), European leaders eased off China's isolation. China's growing economy became the focus for many European visitors and in turn Chinese businessmen began to make frequent trips to Europe. Europe's interest in China led to the EU becoming unusually active with China during the 1990s with high-level exchanges. EU-Chinese trade increased faster than the Chinese economy itself, tripling in ten years from US$14.3 billion in 1985 to US$45.6 billion in 1994.

Political and security co-operation was hampered with China seeing little chance of headway there. Europe was leading the desire for NATO expansion and intervention in Kosovo, which China opposed as it saw them as extending US influence. However, by 2001 China moderated its anti-US stance in the hopes that Europe would cancel its arms embargo but pressure from the US led to the embargo remaining in place. Due to this, China saw the EU as being too weak, divided and dependent on the US to be a significant power. Even in the economic sphere, China was angered at protectionist measures against its exports to Europe and the EU's opposition to giving China the status of market economy in order to join the WTO.

Economic cooperation continued, with the EU's "New Asia Strategy", the first Asia–Europe Meeting in 1996, the 1998 EU-China summit and frequent policy documents desiring closer partnerships with China. Although the 1997 Asian financial crisis dampened investors enthusiasm, China weathered the crisis well and continued to be a major focus of EU trade. Chinese leaders were anxious to return the European interest and made high level visits throughout the 1990s, visits that were accompanied by major EU sales to China. Trade in 1993 saw a 63% increase from the previous year. China became Europe's fourth largest trading partner at this time. Even following the financial crisis in 1997, EU-Chinese trade increased by 15% in 1998.

France was leading the EU's desire for closer ties in order to establish a multipolar world and was the first, along with Russia, to establish strategic partnerships with China. Relations between the European Union and China have experienced a cool down after China canceled the EU-China yearly summit in November 2008. This was apparently caused due to French President Sarkozy's plans to meet with the Dalai Lama.

On 16 October 2018, the European Union Naval Force and the Chinese People's Liberation Army Navy held for the first time ever a joint military exercise. The exercise took place at a Chinese military base in Djibouti and was completed successfully. Rear Admiral Alfonso Perez De Nanclares said that preparations for future exercises with the Chinese Navy are currently taking place.

China sent medical aid and supplies to EU countries affected by the COVID-19 pandemic. EU foreign policy chief Josep Borrell warned that there is "a geo-political component including a struggle for influence through spinning and the ‘politics of generosity’." Borrell also said that "China is aggressively pushing the message that, unlike the US, it is a responsible and reliable partner." During the 2020 China-EU summit, European Council President Charles Michel stated that "Europe is a player, not a playing field" regarding its relationship with China. In December 2020, the EU announced that the Comprehensive Agreement on Investment was concluded in principle. Some analysts said the Agreement may damage relations with the US.

The European Union has been China's most reliable partner with regard to clean energy and addressing climate change.

As of mid-2025, EU-China relations had reached what European Commission President Ursula von der Leyen described as an "inflection point," reflecting the European Union's growing skepticism over China's economic practices and geopolitical stance. The EU voiced concern over a widening trade deficit, which had reached €305.8 billion in 2024, attributing it to Chinese industrial overcapacity and state-subsidized exports. Brussels also criticized Beijing for limiting market access for European firms and imposing retaliatory tariffs on EU goods, including medical devices and liquor. China's tighter export controls on rare earths and critical minerals were viewed as efforts to exploit its market dominance. Political tensions were compounded by Beijing's continued engagement with Russia during the war in Ukraine and its rejection of an EU invitation to Brussels, contributing to what EU officials described as a climate of strategic mistrust. Engin Eroglu, chair of the European Parliament’s China delegation, stated that the already fragile trust between China and the EU had deteriorated further, describing the atmosphere as marked by strategic mistrust and a mood that was tense, if not "frosty."

== Trade ==
The EU and China are each other's largest trading partner as of 2023. The EU is the PRC's largest trading partner, and the PRC is the EU's largest trade partner. In 2023 China accounted for 9% of EU goods exports and 20% of EU goods imports. In 2020, China overtook the US in becoming the EU's largest trade partner in terms of goods. Most of this trade is in industrial and manufactured goods. US is still EU's leading partner when services are included in the calculation. Between 2009 and 2010 alone EU exports to China increased by 38% and China's exports to the EU increased by 31%.

The EU and China signed a geographical indications agreement in September 2020. The agreement developed from pilot programs over the preceding eight years in which China and the EU worked on mutual registering and protection of geographical indications. The 2020 agreement extends mutual recognition of geographical indications to 275 from each side.

On 31 December 2020, the EU announced that the negotiations for the Comprehensive Agreement on Investment were concluded and the deal is pending ratification by the European Parliament. The deal is viewed as a significant step towards market liberalisation in China and "the most ambitious agreement that China has ever concluded" by significantly opening up its internal market to EU companies.

French business leaders, including Airbus and Alstom officials, accompanied Macron to the 2023 France–China Summit. Plans for a new Airbus assembly line in China were announced by Macron during the summit.

During his speech at the World Economic Forum in Davos on 20 January 2026, Macron emphasized the importance of increasing Chinese foreign direct investment (FDI) in key European sectors to promote economic growth and facilitate technology transfer. He urged China to move beyond simply exporting products to Europe and instead focus on local manufacturing and physical presence on the continent.

Direction of trade	Goods (2011)	Services (2010)	FDI (2010)	Goods (2024)	Services (2024)
EU-China	€136.2 billion	€22.3 billion	€7.1 billion	€519 billion	€45 billion
China-EU	€292.1 billion	€16.3 billion	€0.7 billion	€213 billion	€67 billion

=== Trade in goods ===
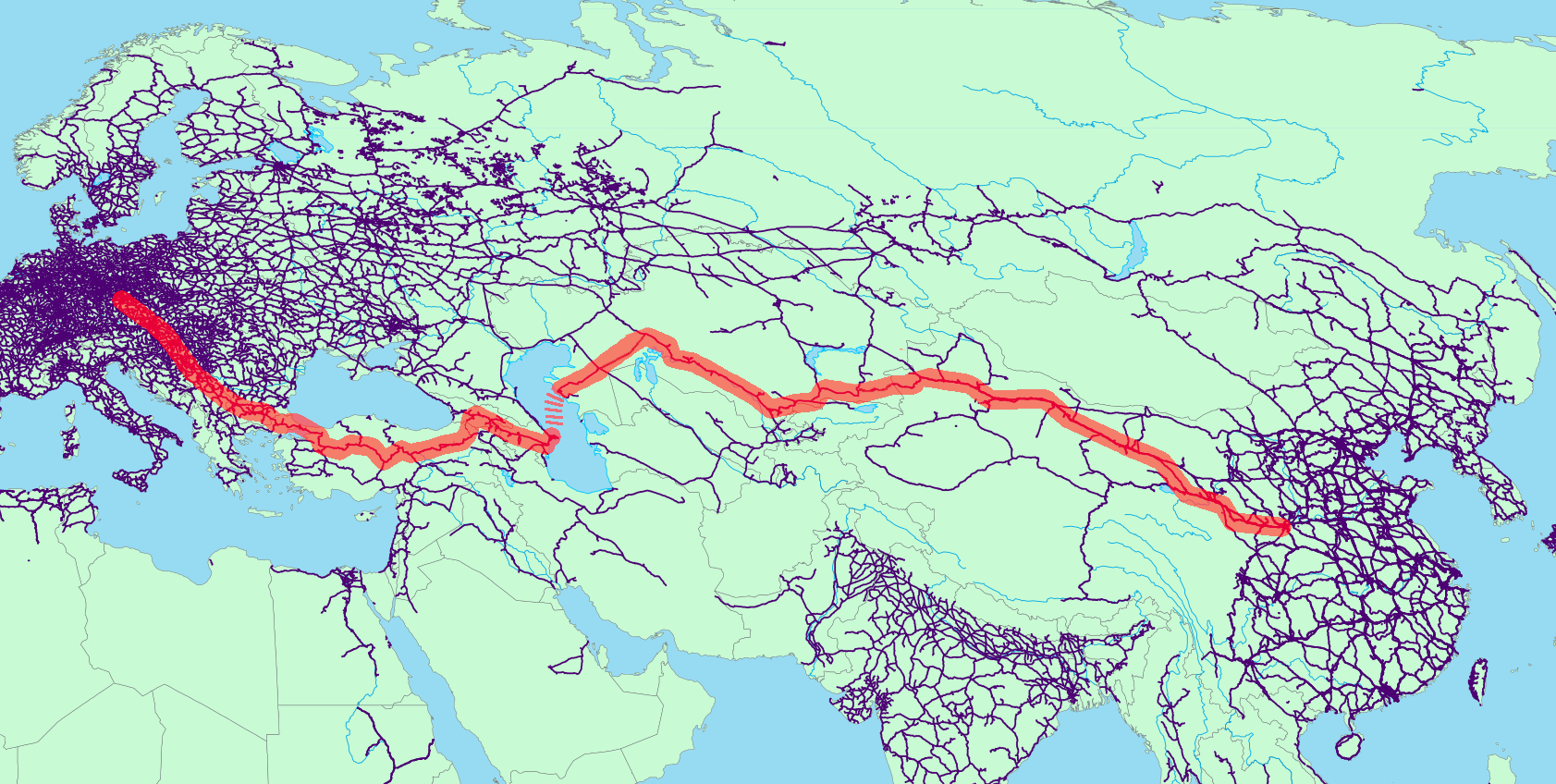
Although the bulk of the trade is done by sea transport, for some goods China is using railroad shipments, most of them through Russia. Shown: the Middle Corridor cargo train route from China to Europe bypassing Russia.

In 2016, the EU-China bilateral trade in goods were €514.8 billion. Machinery and vehicles dominate both exports and imports. The top five exports of China are computers, broadcasting equipment, telephones, office machine parts and integrated circuits. China's top five imports are crude petroleum, integrated circuits, iron ore, gold and cars. For what concerns the EU imports of AMA/NAMA product groups the part for industrial products counts for a value of €343.725 million and gets the impressive percentage of 98.1% (of a total of €350.535 million). The same applies for exports to China where industrial products keep the highest ranking in the list and count for €159,620 million (93.7% of the total export volume).

=== Trade in services ===
Trade of services play an important role in all modern economies. A resilient tertiary service sector, as well as an increased availability of services, may boost economic growth and enhance industrial performance. In an increasingly localised world, services such as finance, insurance, transport, logistics and communications deliver key intermediate inputs and thereby provide crucial support to the rest of the economy. The European Union representing its 27 Member States and China are both members of the World Trade Organisation (WTO) and participate in the ongoing discussions about the Trade in Services Agreement (TiSA). The volume of trade in services of all participating countries corresponds to 70% of the world's total volume. TiSA is an important tool to increase the share of services trade by tackling the existing barriers. With TiSA new opportunities for service providers will be offered while fostering growth, jobs and prosperity at all participating Members. According to the latest statistical information from Eurostat, the EU trade in services balance with China in 2015 present a surplus of €10.3 billion due to a surge of exports (exports reached €36 billion while imports €25.7 billion).

=== Debt purchases ===
During the European debt crisis, several European countries required the EU and International Monetary Fund bailouts. China assisted Europe by buying billions of euros' worth of Eurozone bonds; in particular from Greece, Ireland, Italy, Portugal and Spain. Some analysts suggested China was buying political influence in the EU but China maintains they are building strong trade ties and supporting the European economy so that trade issues can move ahead more smoothly.

=== Trade conflicts ===
Since 2020, both China and the European Union have increasingly turned to trade dispute mechanisms to protect their respective markets. Beijing initiated seven trade investigations and World Trade Organization (WTO) disputes involving European products, while the European Commission launched eleven cases against China, including three following the start of President Donald Trump's second term.

==== Anti-dumping measures ====
The EU has put in place numerous anti-dumping measures to protect its market from cheap products from China, such as steel. In 2023, the EU started an investigation into Chinese biodiesel dumping. In May 2024, the European Commission launched an anti-dumping probe into Chinese tinplate steel. In April 2025, the European Commission placed anti-dumping duties on Chinese construction machinery after it determined that producers were benefiting from unfair subsidies. In September 2025, China subsequently placed duties on EU pork imports.

==== Market access investigations ====
In April 2024, the European Commission launched an investigation into whether China is blocking market access to EU medical devices. In June 2025, the European Commission prohibited the procurement of certain medical devices made by Chinese companies after it concluded that EU-made medical devices do not have reciprocal access in the China market.

==== Electric vehicle tariffs ====
In June 2024, the EU instituted tariffs on imported Chinese electric vehicles.

In 2024, the Chinese government privately urged Chinese automakers to stop making large investments in European countries that supported tariffs on imported Chinese electric vehicles. In November 2024, it was reported that Leapmotor and Stellantis had canceled plans to produce the B10 model in Poland and decided to move its production to Slovakia and Germany.

== Disputes ==
=== Arms embargo ===
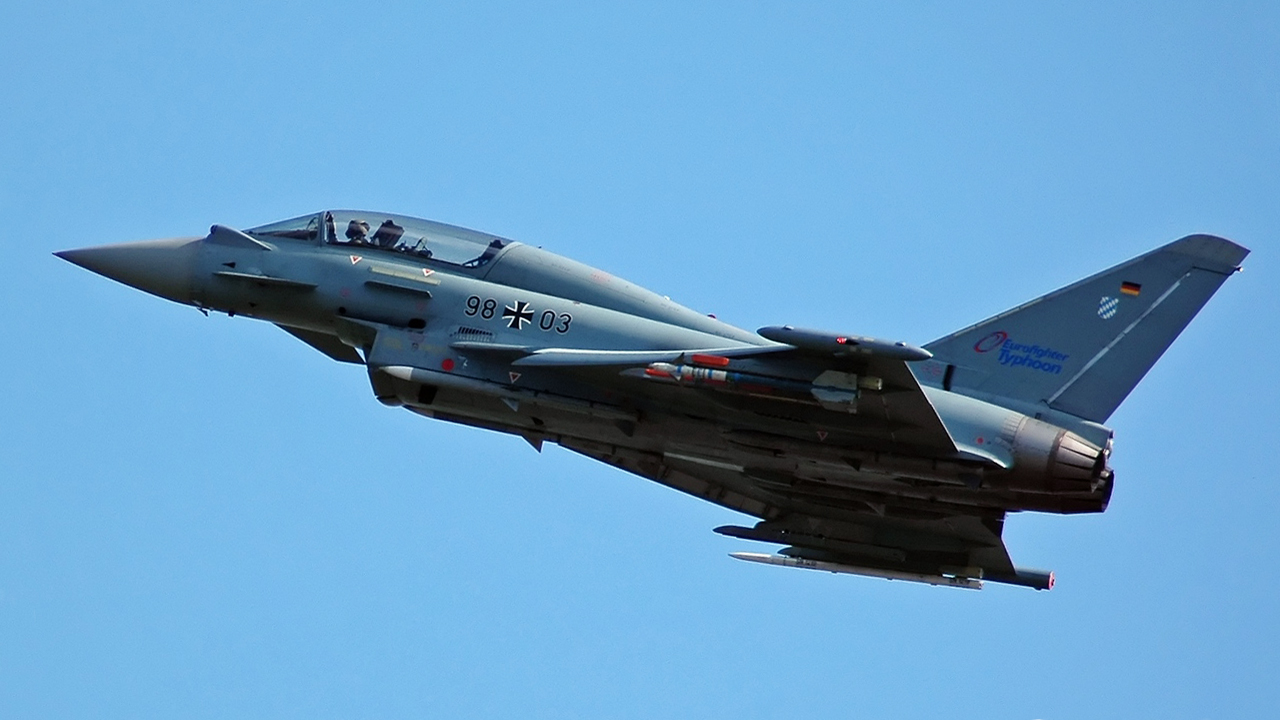
European military hardware, such as the Eurofighter Typhoon (pictured), are banned from being exported to China.

The EU arms embargo on China was imposed by the EU on China in response to its suppression of the Tiananmen Square protests of 1989. China stated its position that the embargo be removed, describing it "very puzzling" and amounting to "political discrimination". In January 2010, China again requested that the embargo be removed.

Whilst the embargo remains, China buys much of its arms from Russia. China had turned to Israel for surveillance planes in 2007, but under pressure from the U.S., Israel refused to go through with the deal. Despite the ban, another leaked US cable suggested that in 2003 the EU sold €400 million of "defence exports" to China, and later approved other sales of military grade submarine and radar technology.

==== Internal EU divisions ====
A leaked US cable indicated the internal divisions in the EU on the ban during negotiations in 2004. France viewed the ban as anachronistic and refused to consider attaching reforms in China as a condition, stating that "China would not accept human rights conditionality." Austria, Belgium, Czechia, Greece, Italy and the UK were all broadly in the French camp. Germany, Denmark, the Netherlands and Sweden wished to attach a lifting of the ban to "specific Chinese steps on human rights." All agreed in principle that if certain conditions were met then the ban should be lifted. Various EU heads of state have objected to the embargo or supported its continued existence. German Chancellor Angela Merkel has previously indicated her opposition to a lifting of the embargo, whereas her predecessor, Gerhard Schröder, had been in favour.

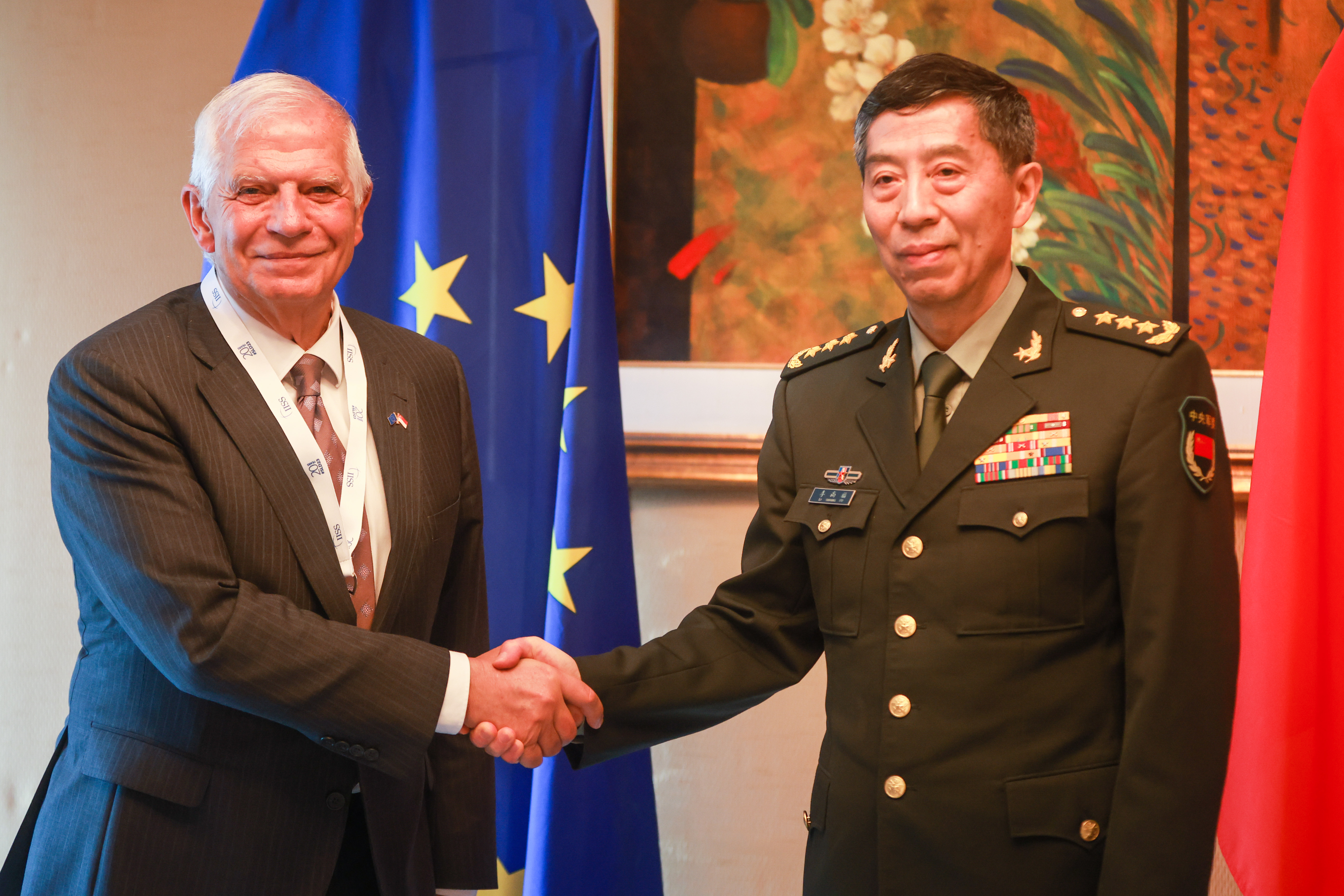
EU High Representative for Foreign Affairs Josep Borrell with Chinese Defence Minister Li Shangfu on 4 June 2023

The European Parliament has been consistently against removing the embargo. However, High Representative Catherine Ashton put forward plans for lifting the embargo in 2010, arguing that "The current arms embargo is a major impediment for developing stronger EU-China co-operation on foreign policy and security matters." Chinese ambassador to the EU Song Zhe agreed, noting that "it doesn't make any sense to maintain the embargo."

==== Outside pressure ====
The United States, which also has an arms embargo on China, states that lifting the embargo will create a technology transfer that will increase the capabilities of the People's Liberation Army. The US has been influential in keeping the EU ban in place. The US sees China as a potential military threat and has pressured the EU in keeping it in place. In 2011 the Chinese EU ambassador suggested that in the future "the EU should make decisions on its own."

Similarly, Japan is equally as against any attempt to remove arms restrictions to China. Japan's government, particularly right-wing members of the cabinet, indicate that any such move will alter the balance of power in Southeast Asia strongly in favour of China at Japan's expense. China described Japan's position as provocative. Meanwhile, Japan stated that the EU's proposal to lift the embargo in 2010 was a mistake in which caused great concern to Japan.

In May 2026, the EU and Japan met in Brussels to strengthen ties and reduce reliance on China, which dominates key minerals, batteries, and clean technology. They expressed concern over China’s use of state-backed control and export limits to gain strategic leverage and agreed to work together on diversifying supply chains and boosting industrial resilience.

=== Human rights ===
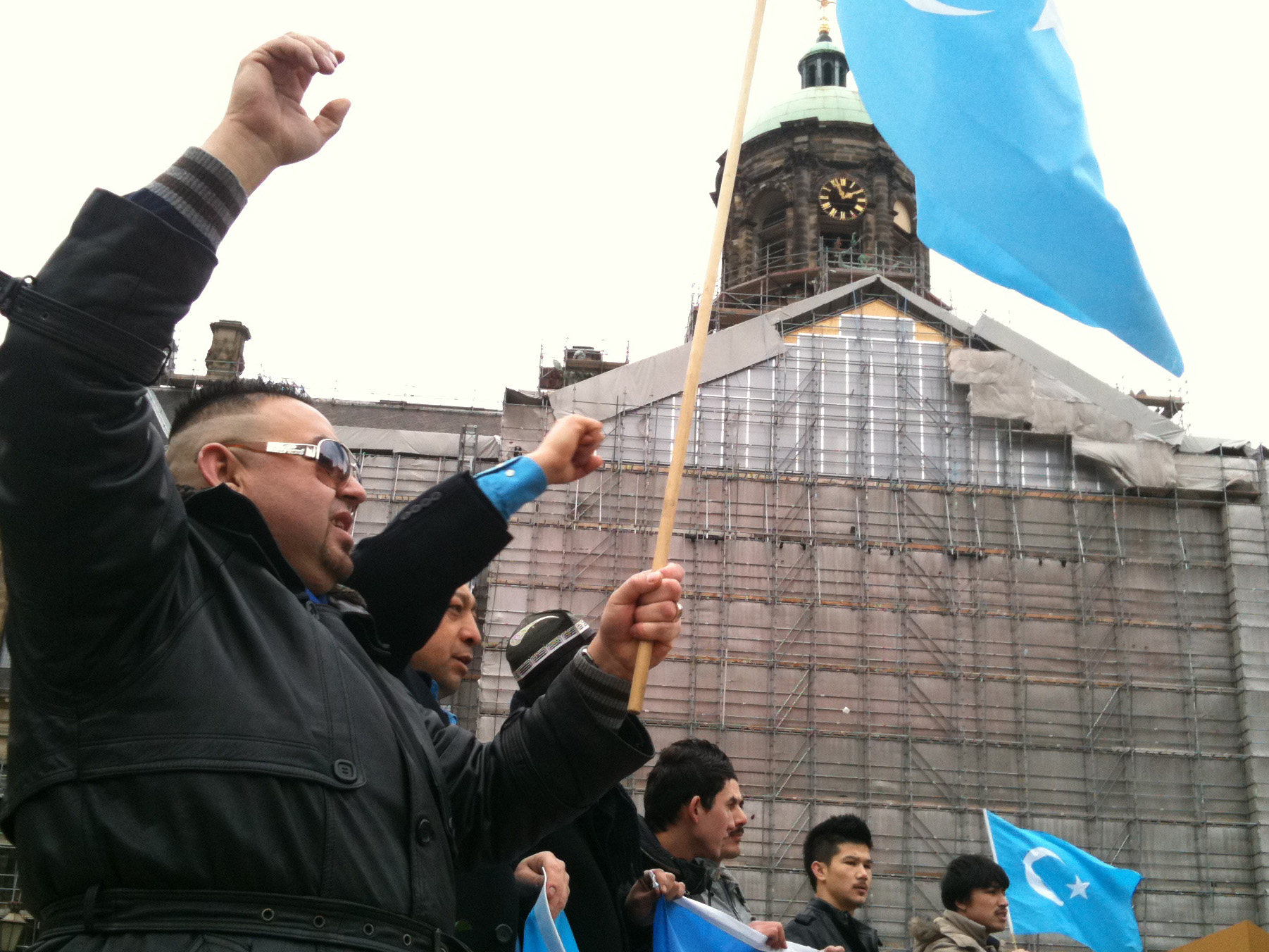
Pro-Uyghur protest in Amsterdam, The Netherlands on 5 February 2011

On 6 October 2020, a group of 39 countries, including most of the EU member states, issued a statement denouncing the Chinese government for its treatment of ethnic minorities and for curtailing freedoms in Hong Kong.

In December 2020, France said it will oppose the proposed Comprehensive Agreement on Investment between China and the European Union over the use of forced labour of Uyghurs. In January 2021, France's junior minister for trade Franck Riester said that France "will sign, the European Union will sign [the investment agreement] with the provision noted in the text, which is to make sustained and continuous efforts for ratification" of an International Labour Organization convention banning forced labour.

On 30 March 2022, the Human Rights Watch urged that European Union leaders should announce specific policy responses to the Chinese government's atrocity crimes. A virtual summit between the EU and China was scheduled for 1 April. The European Parliament has been a staunch critic of the Chinese government's crackdown and has repeatedly denounced its abuses.

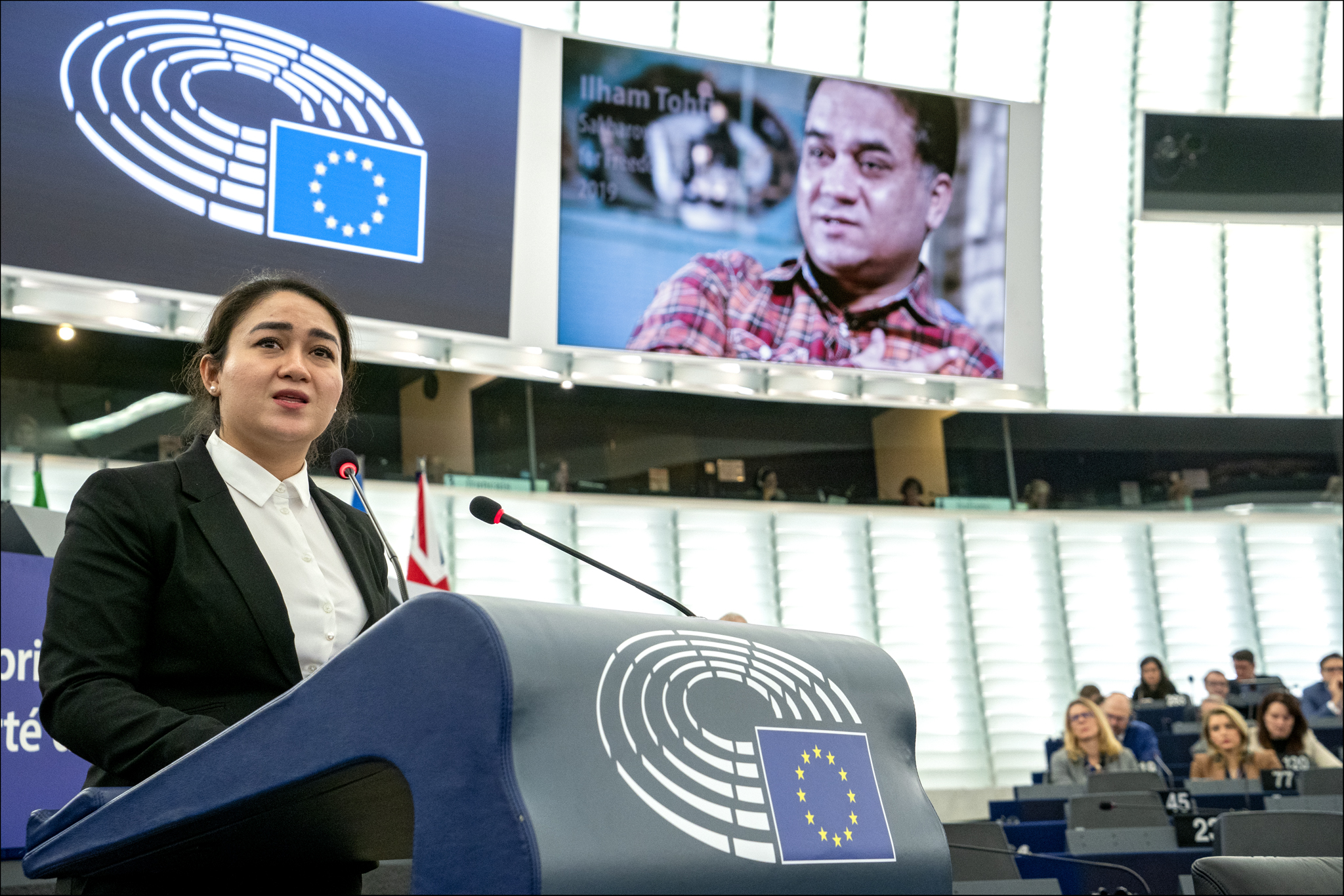
The daughter of Ilham Tohti, an advocate for China's Uyghur minority who is currently serving a life sentence in China, accepted the 2019 Sakharov Prize for Freedom of Thought on behalf of her imprisoned father.

On 9 June 2022, the European Parliament adopted a motion condemning measures taken against the Uyghur community in China, stating that "credible evidence about birth prevention measures and the separation of Uyghur children from their families amount to crimes against humanity and represent a serious risk of genocide" and calling on authorities "to cease all government-sponsored programmes of forced labour and mass forced sterilisation and to put an immediate end to any measures aimed at preventing births in the Uyghur population, including forced abortions or sanctions for birth control violations".

European Commission President Ursula von der Leyen and French President Emmanuel Macron raised the issue of human rights in China during their visit to China in April 2023, amid growing international criticism of China's repression of ethnic minorities, political dissidents, and civil society activists. They expressed their concerns over the situation in Xinjiang, where the Chinese government has detained an estimated one million Uyghurs and other Turkic Muslims in re-education camps, subjected them to forced labor and surveillance.

On 27 June 2026, 151 Tibetan groups called on the foreign ministers of 14 countries and the EU to oppose China’s Ethnic Unity and Progress Law. Lawmakers in Estonia, Latvia, and Lithuania also pushed for a Europe-wide condemnation of the measure. They said the law could further weaken the language, culture, and religious traditions of ethnic minorities and urged governments to act before it took effect on 1 July 2026.

On 17 September 2026, the European Parliament passed a resolution condemning the deterioration of freedoms in Hong Kong and the arrest of several pro-democracy figures while calling for sanctions on certain officials in Hong Kong and mainland China.

=== Standpoint on Taiwan ===
The EU endorses maintaining the current status quo and resolving disputes peacefully in the Taiwan Strait, opposing any threats or use of force. It promotes ongoing dialogue and positive engagement. The EU adheres to its "One China" policy, acknowledging the People's Republic of China as the only legal government of China, while fostering strong ties and extensive collaboration with Taiwan across various sectors.

China's 2018 policy paper on European Union relations (its most current such policy paper as of 2023) states China's view that the EU should uphold the One China Principle, explicitly oppose Taiwan independence in any form, and limit EU-Taiwan exchanges to non-official and people-to-people contacts.

In 2021, a diplomatic spat between Lithuania and China over Taiwan and human rights spilled over to the rest of the EU when China banned the import of goods which contained Lithuanian parts potentially disrupting integrated supply chains in the common market. EU ambassador to China Nicolas Chapuis supported Lithuania and attempted to intervene on their behalf. The president of the EU Chamber of Commerce in China described the Chinese government's move as "unprecedented." Major German, French, and Swedish companies have been impacted by the ban. The Bundesverband der Deutschen Industrie described the ban as a “devastating own goal.” However, in 2022, the German Chamber of Commerce warned Lithuania that German-owned factories will be closed if relations with China are not improved.

In April 2023, European Commission president Ursula von der Leyen and French President Emmanuel Macron officially visited Beijing to assert economic ties between the two largest global markets. China is the largest source of imports into the European Union. Von der Leyen and Macron emphasized the EU's commitment to the One China policy. During this 2023 France-China Summit, French President Emmanuel Macron called for Europe to reduce its dependence on the United States in general and to stay neutral and avoid being drawn into any possible confrontation between the U.S. and China over Taiwan. Speaking after a three-day state visit to China, Macron emphasised his theory of strategic autonomy, suggesting that Europe could become a "third superpower". in a follow-up speech in The Hague to further outline his vision of strategic autonomy for Europe.

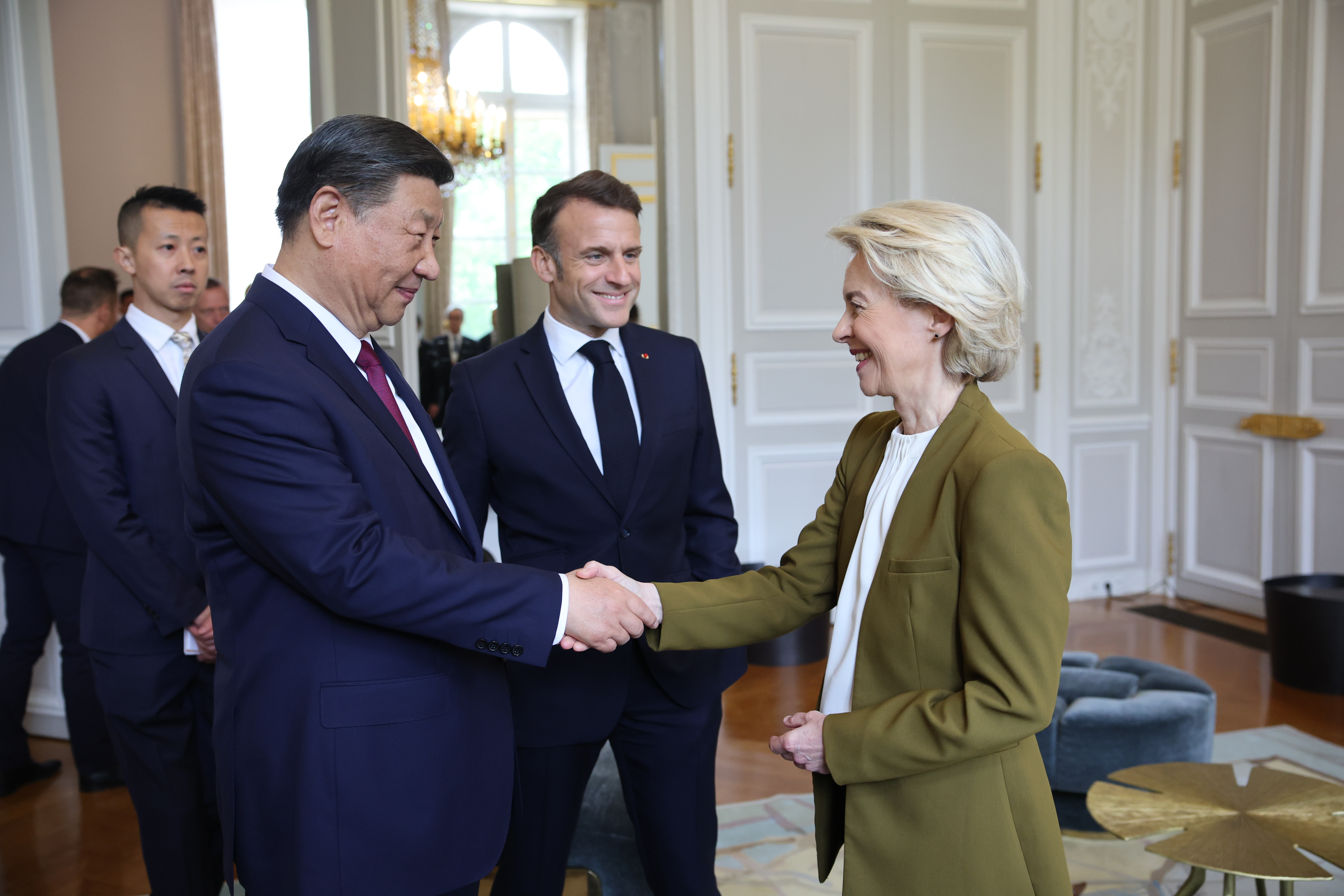
Macron, Ursula von der Leyen, and Xi Jinping at the Elysee Palace in Paris during Xi's state visit to France, 6 May 2024

Macron furthermore announced his position to no longer follow an exclusive American model, and instead develop a European "strategic autonomy" towards the issue. He urged that the EU must avoid being "dragged into a confrontation" between China and the U.S. over the issue of Taiwan. Two weeks later, von der Leyen accused China for its implied 'divide-and-conquer tactics', a strategy that China firmly rejects. The push by the U.S. to include the EU in its opposition against Chinese hegemony had split the European Union into differential opinions among its members, with regard to Taiwan. The European Commission president had warned that any military intervention on Taiwan would have cataclysmic effects on the global economy.

On 7 June 2023, a report by the pan-European think tank European Council on Foreign Relations (ECFR) found that most Europeans agree with Macron's views on China and the United States.

=== COVID-19 pandemic ===
During the COVID-19 pandemic, a number of EU countries bought medical equipment including personal protective equipment and test kits from China, a number of which were found to be defective. Due to the defective medical equipment and for China having initially failed to disclose information on the COVID-19 virus, on 21 April 2020 a cross party group of 10 MEPs wrote to the President of the European Council, Ursula von der Leyen and EU High Representative Josep Borrell requesting they take action against China. On 1 May 2020, the EC President Ursula von der Leyen backed investigation into the coronavirus origin. By 17 May 2020, a coalition of 62 countries backed a joint Australian, EU push for an independent inquiry into the COVID-19 outbreak.

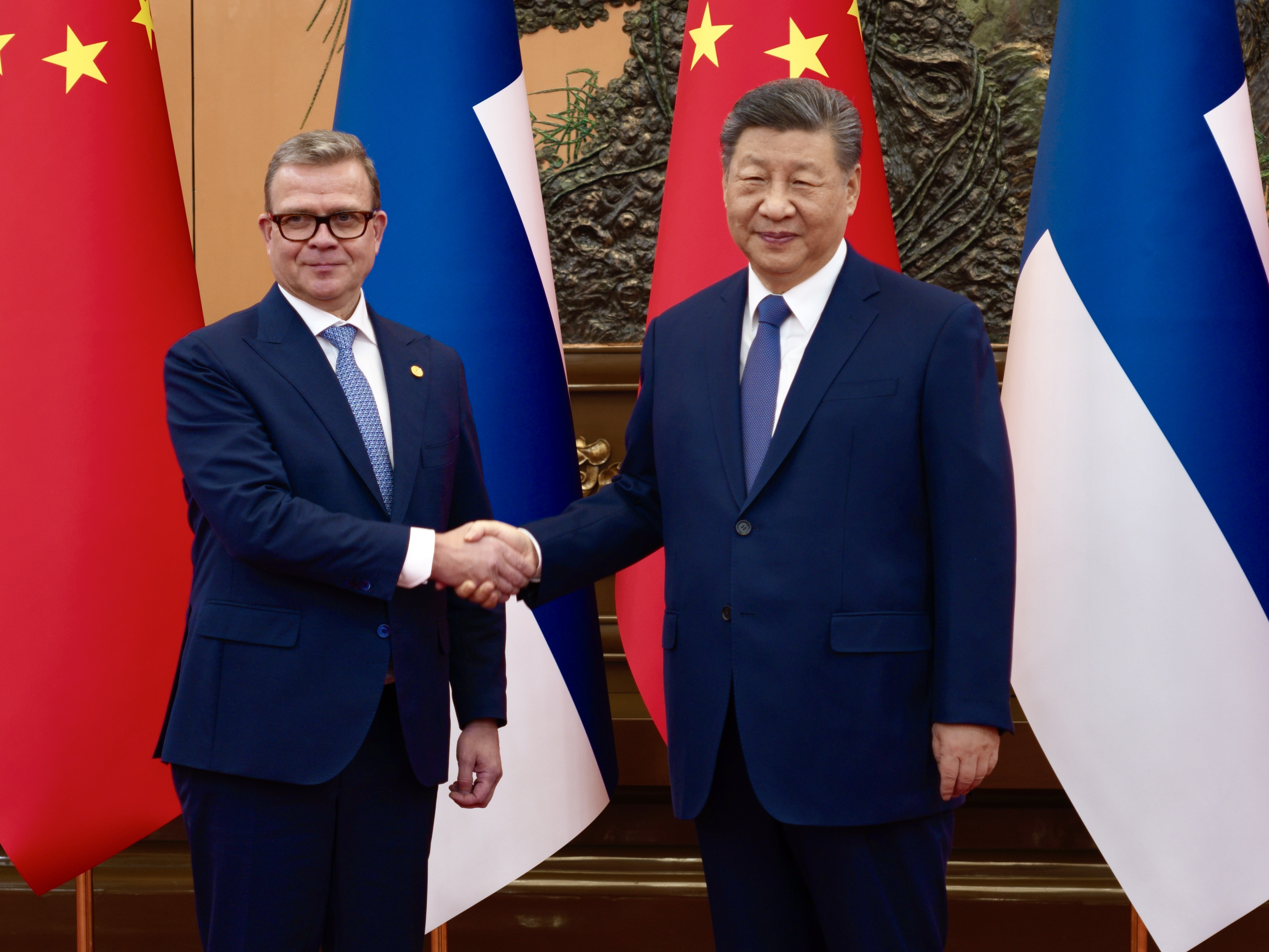
Xi Jinping with Finnish Prime Minister Petteri Orpo in Beijing, China, 27 January 2026

=== Telecommunications security ===
In May 2026, the European Commission recommended that all EU member states exclude equipment made by Chinese companies Huawei and ZTE from their telecom infrastructure, citing security risks.

=== Chinese cyber-attacks ===
On 22 June 2020, during COVID-19 pandemic, EU Commission President Ursula von der Leyen called out the People's Republic of China for allegedly conducting cyberattacks against EU hospitals and health care institutions. In May 2025, Kaja Kallas condemned the People's Republic of China for what she called a "malicious cyber campaign" against the Czech Ministry of Foreign Affairs and threatened sanctions. In March 2026, the EU imposed sanctions on China-based Integrity Technology Group and Anxun Information Technology for cyberattacks on multiple EU member states, including on critical infrastructure.

=== Russian invasion of Ukraine ===
China's relations with Europe became challenging following the Russian invasion of Ukraine when the US accused both Moscow and Beijing of aligning themselves. According to a New York Times report on 25 February 2022, the US government shared intelligence with China on Russia's troop buildup over three months and beseeched China to tell Russia not to invade, which Chinese officials rebuffed, saying they did not think an invasion was in the works, while sharing the information with Russia. On 2 March, the New York Times reported that a Western intelligence report indicated that Chinese officials had asked Putin to delay the invasion till after the 2022 Winter Olympics China was hosting. The Guardian reported a source confirmed the claim to Reuters, but that the Chinese embassy in Washington vehemently denied it as a 'smear' to blame China. Richard McGregor wrote that China was "struggling to settle on a clear message over Ukraine" because it was "trying to reconcile the irreconcilable" between Russia and Ukraine.

In February 2024, the European Union proposed sanctions that would target Chinese companies aiding Russia's war effort in Ukraine. On 25 June 2024, China requested that the EU revoke sanctions on Chinese firms accused of supporting Russia in its war in Ukraine, highlighting its opposition to unilateral sanctions and noting formal protests to the EU. In December 2024, EU sanctioned several Chinese and Hong Kong entities for supporting Russia's military.

In November 2024, EU foreign affairs chief Kaja Kallas stated that China must pay a "higher cost" for its support of the Russian invasion of Ukraine. On 11 February 2025, Kallas condemned China's support for Russia, saying that "Without China’s support, Russia would not be able to continue its military aggression with the same force. China is the largest provider of dual-use goods and sensitive items that sustain Russia’s military-industrial base and that are found on the battlefield in Ukraine."

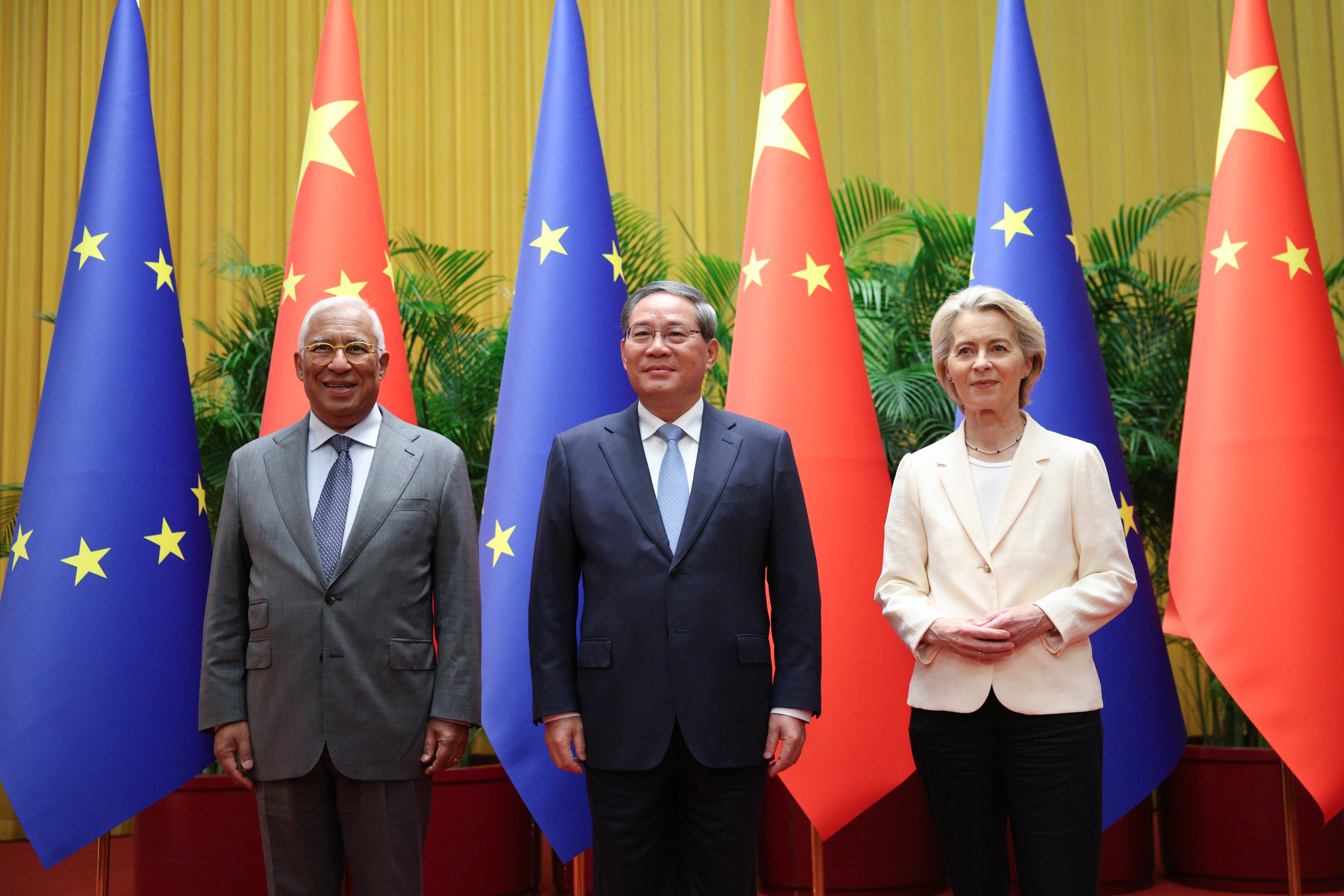
EU–China Summit in Beijing, July 2025: From left to right — António Costa, Li Qiang, and Ursula von der Leyen

In a July 2025 meeting with High Representative of the Union for Foreign Affairs and Security Policy Kaja Kallas, Director of the Chinese Communist Party's Central Foreign Affairs Commission Office Wang Yi expressed that China did not wish to see Russia's loss in Ukraine. Diplomats reported that China is concerned the United States may shift its focus more toward Asia once the conflict in Europe concludes.

At the 2025 EU-China Summit, European Council President António Costa and Commission President Ursula von der Leyen stated that China's support for Russia's invasion of Ukraine posed a direct threat to European security. They further stated that Beijing's position on the war would influence future EU-China relations.

In September 2025, US President Donald Trump urged EU member states to stop buying Russian oil and start putting economic pressure on China for funding Russia's war effort. Trump asked the EU to impose 100% tariffs on China. In October 2025, a group of delegates from the National People's Congress told European Parliament members that NATO should not exist and repeated pro-Kremlin talking points about the Russian invasion of Ukraine. Western officials at the 62nd Munich Security Conference stated that China's support for Russia increased in 2025. In June 2026, Kaja Kallas stated that the EU had "verified reports" that China had trained Russians troops to fight in Ukraine.

==== Sanctions ====
In May 2023, the European Union discussed placing sanctions on companies from China and five other countries for selling equipment that could be used in weapons by Russia. The Chinese government made a commitment to put pressure on the China-based companies on the list, prompting the EU to temporarily remove five of the eight Chinese companies on the draft list. In January 2024, the EU proposed export bans on three firms in mainland China. In December 2024, in its 15th sanctions package, the EU included sanctions against several mainland Chinese and Hong Kong entities for supporting Russia's military. In February 2025, the EU added 25 mainland Chinese and Hong Kong entities to a blacklist for circumventing sanctions on Russia, including a drone factory in Xinjiang. In July 2025, the EU sanctioned two Chinese banks for aiding Russia's military. In October 2025, the EU announced that its 19th sanctions package against Russia will include sanctions against four Chinese entities, including two oil refineries involved with the Russian shadow fleet. In April 2026, the EU's 20th sanctions package against Russia included Chinese entities it accused of providing dual-use goods and weapons systems to Russia's military-industrial complex.

=== International Criminal Court ===
While the EU's 27 member states are among the parties to the Rome Statute of the International Criminal Court which comprises a total of 125 member states China is not a party to it.

== Comparison ==
	European Union	People's Republic of China
Population	447,206,135	1,420,684,227
Area	4,232,147 km^{2} (1,634,041 sq mi)	9,596,961 km^{2} (3,705,407 sq mi)
Population Density	115/km^{2} (300/sq mi)	145/km^{2} (375.5/sq mi)
Capital	Brussels (de facto)	Beijing
Global cities	Paris, Amsterdam, Milan, Frankfurt, Madrid, Brussels	Beijing, Hong Kong, Shanghai, Guangzhou, Shenzhen
Government	Supranational parliamentary democracy based on the European treaties	Unitary one-party socialist republic
First leader	High Authority President Jean Monnet	CCP Chairman Mao Zedong
Current leaders	Council President Antonio Costa; Commission President Ursula von der Leyen; Parliament President Roberta Metsola	CCP General Secretary and President Xi Jinping; Premier of the State Council Li Qiang
Top diplomat	High Representative of the Union for Foreign Affairs and Security Policy Kaja Kallas	Director of the Chinese Communist Party's Central Foreign Affairs Commission Office Wang Yi
Official languages	Languages of the EU	Standard Chinese
GDP in 2025 (nominal)	$20.287 trillion	$19.535 trillion

== China's foreign relations with EU member states ==
- Austria
- Belgium
- Bulgaria
- Croatia
- Cyprus
- Czech Republic
- Denmark
- Estonia
- Finland
- France
- Germany
- Greece
- Hungary
- (Republic of Ireland) Ireland
- Italy
- Latvia
- Lithuania
- Luxembourg
- Malta
- Netherlands
- Poland
- Portugal
- Romania
- Slovakia
- Slovenia
- Spain
- Sweden

== See also ==
- Ambassador of China to the European Union
- Cooperation between China and Central and Eastern European Countries
- China–United States relations
- China–Russia relations
- List of ambassadors of the European Union to China
