= Lumi and Pyry =

Giant pandas displayed in Finland

- Species: Giant panda
- Born: China
- Lumi
- Sex: Female
- Born: 20 September 2014 (age 12)
- Pyry
- Sex: Male
- Born: 10 July 2013 (age 13)

Lumi (Note: lit. 'Snow', originally Chinese: Jin Bao Bao) (born 20 September 2014) and Pyry (Note: lit. 'Snowfall', originally Chinese: Hua Bao) (born 10 July 2013) are giant pandas from China that were loaned to Ähtäri Zoo in Finland.

In the spring of 2016, it was announced that the Ähtäri Zoo could rent giant pandas from China. The 12-million euro, 15-year agreement for renting pandas between Ähtäri Zoo and the National Panda Administration of China was signed in April 2017. The pandas were considered an important foreign policy project in Finland, and their arrival in Finland was mentioned as the result of an agreement between the President of the Republic, Sauli Niinistö, and the General Secretary of the Chinese Communist Party, Xi Jinping. However, due to the expensive maintenance of giant pandas and a lack of government funding, the zoo decided to return Lumi and Pyry early to China in late 2024.

== Early life and background ==
Pyry was born on 10 July 2013 and Lumi was born on 20 September 2014. Not much is known about their personalities, other than Lumi being more playful than Pyry.

On 16 April 2016, representatives Anne Kalmari (Centre) and Teuvo Hakkarainen (Finns party) of the nine-member Finland Agriculture and Forestry Committee (Finnish: Maa- ja metsätalousvaliokunta) travelled to Beijing and Shanghai for a week to discuss agriculture and forestry issues, food production and the promotion of Finnish exports. They met with Chen Fengxuen, deputy minister of forest management responsible for pandas, to discuss forestry issues. The panda project, which had been in negotiations for a long time, "came as an extra point on the discussion list". Kalmari expressed to Keskisuomalainen that an agreement was 99.9 per cent sure. Through China's panda diplomacy program, giant pandas are loaned to multiple European countries in addition to Finland, including Belgium, the Netherlands, Austria and France, as a symbol of friendship. It was announced in spring 2016 that the Ähtäri Zoo could rent giant pandas from China.

Construction of the Ähtäri panda house began in February 2017. The interior space was about 2,400 square metres and the outdoor yard was about 3,000 square metres. Indoor conditions were challenging because it is a greenhouse-type climate. The humidity and air temperature in the enclosure were precisely controlled to keep the vegetation in good condition. The climbing area of the house was designed to closely resemble the pandas' natural environment in Sichuan, and was coated with a special compound, because bear faeces corrodes concrete. The building complex also included a ticket office, a restaurant and a souvenir shop. Construction on the panda house, which was known as the Snowpanda House, was not complete until a week before the arrival of the pandas. The Snowpanda House cost 8.2 million euros, which was paid for by Ähtärin Eläinpuisto Oy, the zoo's parent company. Ähtäri tried to grant it eight million and then ten million euro loan guarantees, but the Vaasa administrative court overturned the city council's decisions.

After travelling from Dujiangyan Panda Center, the two pandas flew from Chengdu Shuangliu International Airport and arrived at Helsinki Airport on 18 January 2018, when they were three and four years old, respectively. After being quarantined for a month, male Hua Bao (named Pyry) and female Jin Baobao (Lumi) could first be seen by the public on 17 February. Their travel came after Chinese president Xi Jinping visited Finland and signed a joint agreement.

== Time in Finland ==
It was expected that the pandas would bring 100,000 annual visitors to Ähtäri, which would translate to an additional annual income of around six million euros for companies in the region. A total of 275,000 visitors visited the zoo in 2018. The number was close to the target, which was 280,000 visitors. The revenue doubled compared to the previous year, rising to eleven million euros. The zoo achieved a profit of 1.2 million euros, but the following year, Ähtäri Zoo companies made a loss of about one million euros and had to reduce their operations by a dismissal or part-time employment of a maximum of 20 people of their 50 employees.

The starting point of the project was for the two pandas to have a cub. By July 2022, Lumi had not produced the expected cub. There were three additional mating attempts, two of which ended with pseudopregnancies, and the third attempt at artificial insemination also did not succeed.

The Finnish Parliament assisted Ähtäri Zoo with 1.5 million euros, and an additional budget of three million euros was presented at the beginning of 2023, before plans were made to return the pandas. China also tried to assist the zoo prior to these return plans.

In 2023, the Ministry of Agriculture and Forestry proposed a support of up to five million euros for the zoo, which was approved in the supplemental budget proposal by the Ministry of Finance, led by centrist Finance Minister Annika Saarikko. When the proposal aroused widespread criticism, the Minister of Agriculture and Forestry Antti Kurvinen (Centre) withdrew his proposal.

== Issues and return to China ==
Lumi and Pyry's time at the Ähtäri Zoo was marked by financial difficulties, the earliest of which concerned the toy balls they were given. The two giant pandas chewed through their rubber balls, so the woodworking company Puuartisti (English: Woodartist) made wooden balls, which weighed 12 kilograms, measured 40 centimetres in diameter, and had a compartment for hiding snacks.

No insurance company agreed to insure the pandas, so the Finnish government promised to pay China two million euros in compensation if the pandas died during the flight. The pandas were leased to Ähtäri with a 15-year contract. Over the course of 15 years, they would have cost Ähtäri a total of around 14 million euros. An adult panda eats about 12 kilograms of bamboo every day, which translates to an annual cost of about 100,000 euros. Ähtäri Zoo ordered bamboo from a Dutch greenhouse, although a project was underway to cultivate bamboo suitable for pandas in Ähtäri. Beginning in the 2020s, the number of visitors decreased due to factors such as the COVID-19 pandemic and the Russian invasion of Ukraine. Furthermore, the zoo was more than two hours away from any of the major cities in Finland.

On 27 January 2023, Ähtäri Zoo announced its intention to return the pandas to China eight years earlier than initially planned. These plans became difficult in terms of foreign and trade policy, and the transportation costs would be high if the pandas were eventually returned. In September 2024, it was announced that the pandas would be returned at the end of the year. They could be seen by the public until 21 October. The zoo eventually went bankrupt in October 2025, and Lumi and Pyry were sent to a new panda base in Mianyang.

== See also ==
- List of individual giant pandas
- List of individual bears
