= Bank of China (Europe) =

Luxembourg-based subsidiary of the Bank of China

Bank of China (Europe) S.A.
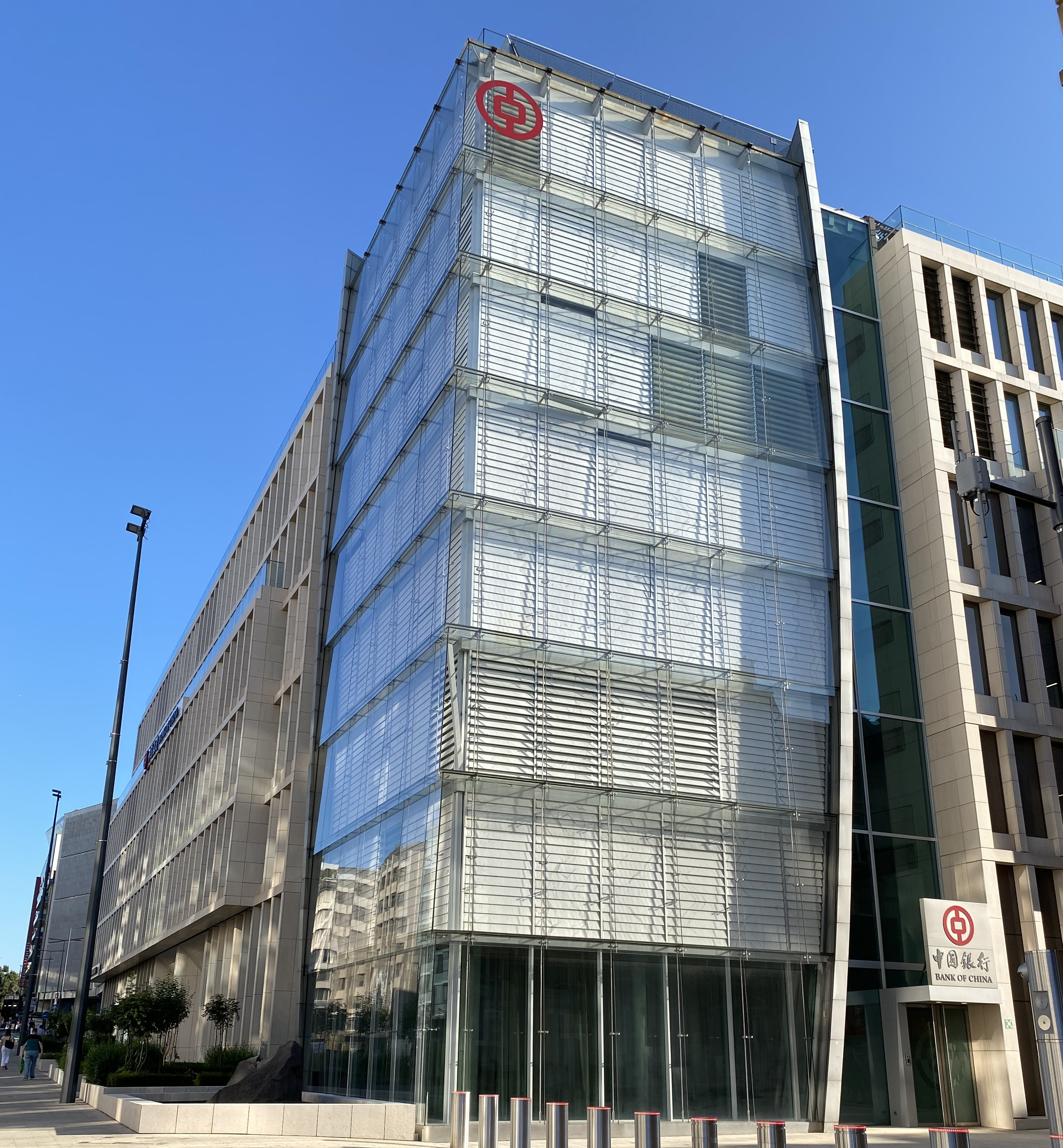
- Formerly: Bank of China (Luxembourg) S.A. (1991–2022)
- Type: Subsidiary (société anonyme)
- Industry: Banking
- Founded: 1991 (Luxembourg branch of the parent bank since 1979)
- Headquarters: 55, boulevard Royal, Luxembourg City, Luxembourg
- Area served: European Union
- Services: Corporate banking, trade finance, syndicated lending, financial markets, asset management
- Number of employees: over 600 (2024)
- Parent: Bank of China
- Subsidiaries: Bank of China (Central and Eastern Europe); Bank of China Srbija
- Website: www.boc.cn/lu/en/index.html

Bank of China (Europe) S.A., known until January 2022 as Bank of China (Luxembourg) S.A., is a bank incorporated in Luxembourg and wholly owned by the Bank of China. Founded in 1991, it operates alongside the Bank of China Luxembourg Branch, which the parent bank opened in 1979 as the first foreign branch set up by a Chinese bank after the founding of the People's Republic of China. From its head office in Luxembourg City, the subsidiary has opened branches in the Netherlands, Belgium, Poland, Sweden, Portugal, Greece and Ireland. Since 2022 it has also owned the group's subsidiaries in Hungary and Serbia, and it serves as the Bank of China's intermediate parent undertaking in the European Union.

The Bank of China was the first of seven Chinese banking groups to make Luxembourg the base of their operations in the European Union.

== History ==
=== Luxembourg Branch (1979–1991) ===
The Bank of China, which had operated a branch in London since before 1949, opened a branch in Luxembourg in 1979. It was the first branch that a Chinese bank had established abroad since the founding of the People's Republic. The move followed the establishment of diplomatic relations between Luxembourg and the People's Republic in 1972. Luxembourg served during the Cold War as an unobtrusive venue for international payments and already hosted a Soviet-owned bank as well as American banks.

For roughly two decades the branch remained the only Chinese bank in the Grand Duchy. The Industrial and Commercial Bank of China (ICBC) opened a representative office there in 1998, which became a full branch in 1999.

=== Subsidiary and dual structure (1991–2007) ===
In 1991 the bank incorporated Bank of China (Luxembourg) S.A. under Luxembourg law in order to adapt to the development of the European common market. From then on the group operated in Luxembourg through both a branch of the parent bank and a locally incorporated subsidiary. This "branch-cum-subsidiary" arrangement has been described as the model that the other Chinese banks reproduced when they established themselves in Luxembourg after 2013.

=== Expansion in the European Union (2007–2021) ===
The subsidiary opened its first branch outside Luxembourg in Rotterdam in 2007; it was the first Chinese financial institution in the Netherlands. A branch in Brussels opened in 2010. In Warsaw, operations began in 2012. The Stockholm branch opened in July 2012. The Lisbon branch began operating in 2013. A branch in Athens was incorporated in November 2019 as the first Chinese financial institution authorised to operate in Greece.

The Luxembourg entities were also involved in several firsts for Chinese finance in the Grand Duchy. In 2014 the bank issued renminbi-denominated bonds listed on the Luxembourg Stock Exchange; marketed as the "Schengen bond", the issue was described as the first renminbi bond issued and listed by a Chinese company in continental Europe. In 2016 it became the first Chinese bank to list a green bond on the Luxembourg Green Exchange.

=== Bank of China (Europe) (since 2022) ===
On 10 January 2022 Bank of China (Luxembourg) S.A. changed its name to Bank of China (Europe) S.A., and its foreign branches adopted the new name over the following weeks. The bank presented the change as a reflection of the growth of its business across Europe.

== See also ==
- Bank of China
- List of banks in Luxembourg
- China–Luxembourg relations
