= List of ambassadors of the European Union to China =

Ambassador of the European Union to China
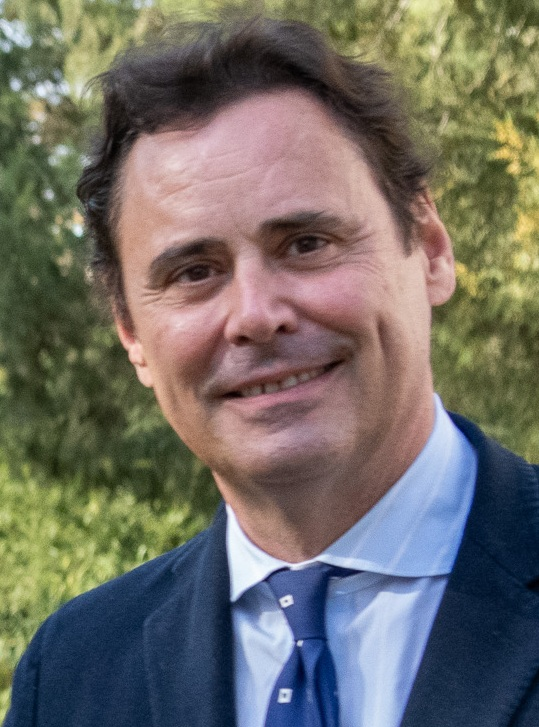
- Incumbent; Jorge Toledo Albiñana since 2022
- Delegation of the European Union to China; 39.944231°N 116.453770°E
- Inaugural holder: Pierre Duchâteau
- Formation: 1988
- Website: https://eeas.europa.eu/delegations/china_en

The European Union ambassador to China is the official representative of the European Union to the government of China, concurrently accredited to Mongolia.

== List of representatives ==
Diplomatic agreement/Diplomatic accreditation	Term end	Ambassador	Observations
1988	1994	Pierre Duchâteau	
1994	2001	Endymion Wilkinson	
2001	2005	Klaus-Dieter Ebermann	
2005	2010	Serge Abou	
2010	2014	Markus Ederer	
2014	2018	Hans Dietmar Schweisgut	
2018	2022	Nicolas Chapuis	
2022		Jorge Toledo Albiñana	

== See also ==
- Ambassador of China to the European Union
- China–European Union relations
