= China–Cyprus relations =

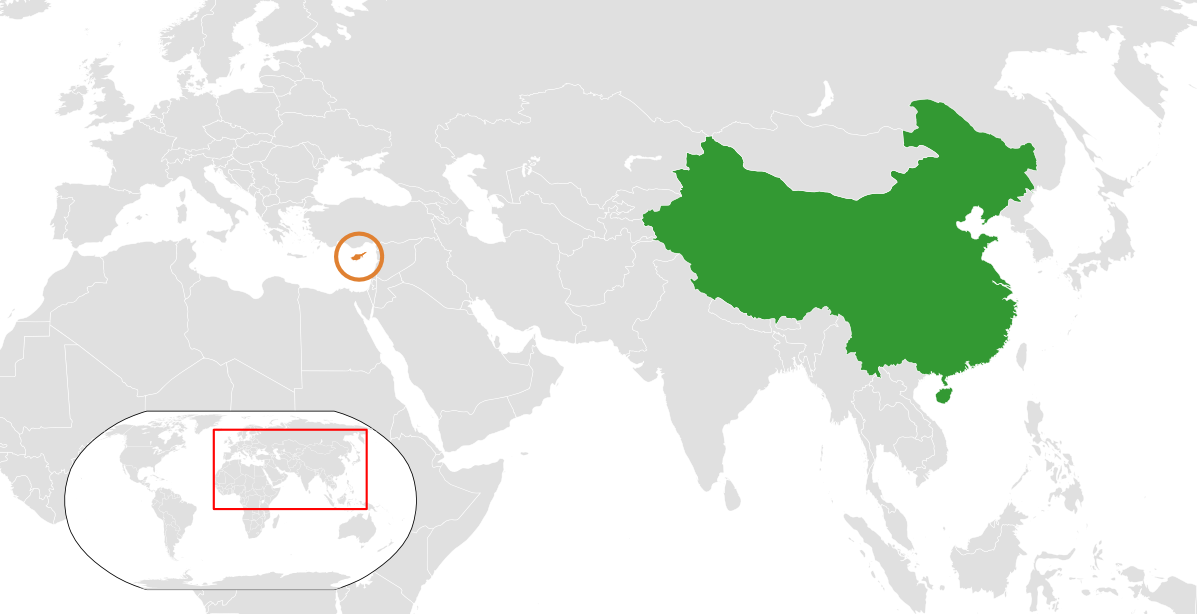
- China: Cyprus

Cyprus–China relations refers to the bilateral relations between Cyprus and China. China is represented in Cyprus through its embassy in Nicosia, Cyprus, and Cyprus is represented in China through its embassy in Beijing, China. Both countries are full members of the United Nations.

Cyprus and China established diplomatic relations on 14 December 1971, and the Embassy of the Republic of Cyprus in Beijing was opened in 1989. The embassy is in the Embassy District of Beijing, near the EU Delegation to China, and not far from the Ministry of Foreign Affairs of China.

== Economic cooperation ==
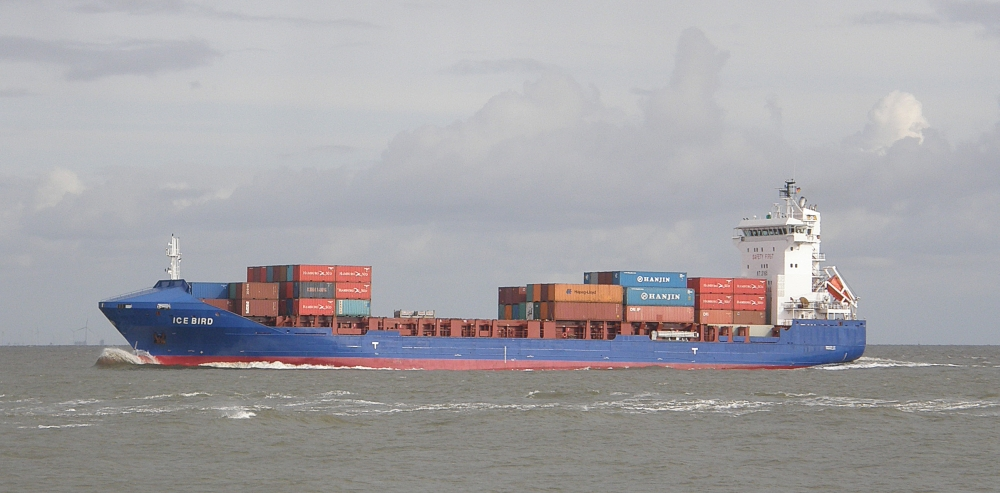
Cypriot container ship to China

An association established by the Cyprus Chamber of Commerce and Industry called the Cyprus-China Business Association, is intended to promote, expand and encourage economic services, improve trade relations between Cyprus and China, and organise meetings with officials of the two countries, with a view to safeguarding the smooth operation and flow of trade between the two countries.

China-Cyprus economic and trade ties have remained strong in recent years, yielding positive outcomes, with high-level inter-government dialogues becoming more regular, and investment in telecommunications, transportation, information technology, oil, tourism, and other fields booming.

Cyprus exported goods worth an estimated 11.5 million euros in terms of trade in 2010, whilst China exports goods worth an estimated 310.4 million euros to Cyprus in 2010.

China has launched the Belt and Road Initiative (BRI) and the 21st-Century Maritime Silk Road economic belt, in which Cyprus will play an important role, due to its position between Europe, Asia, and Africa, and the advanced shipping industry. Cyprus joined the BRI in 2019.

== Political relations ==
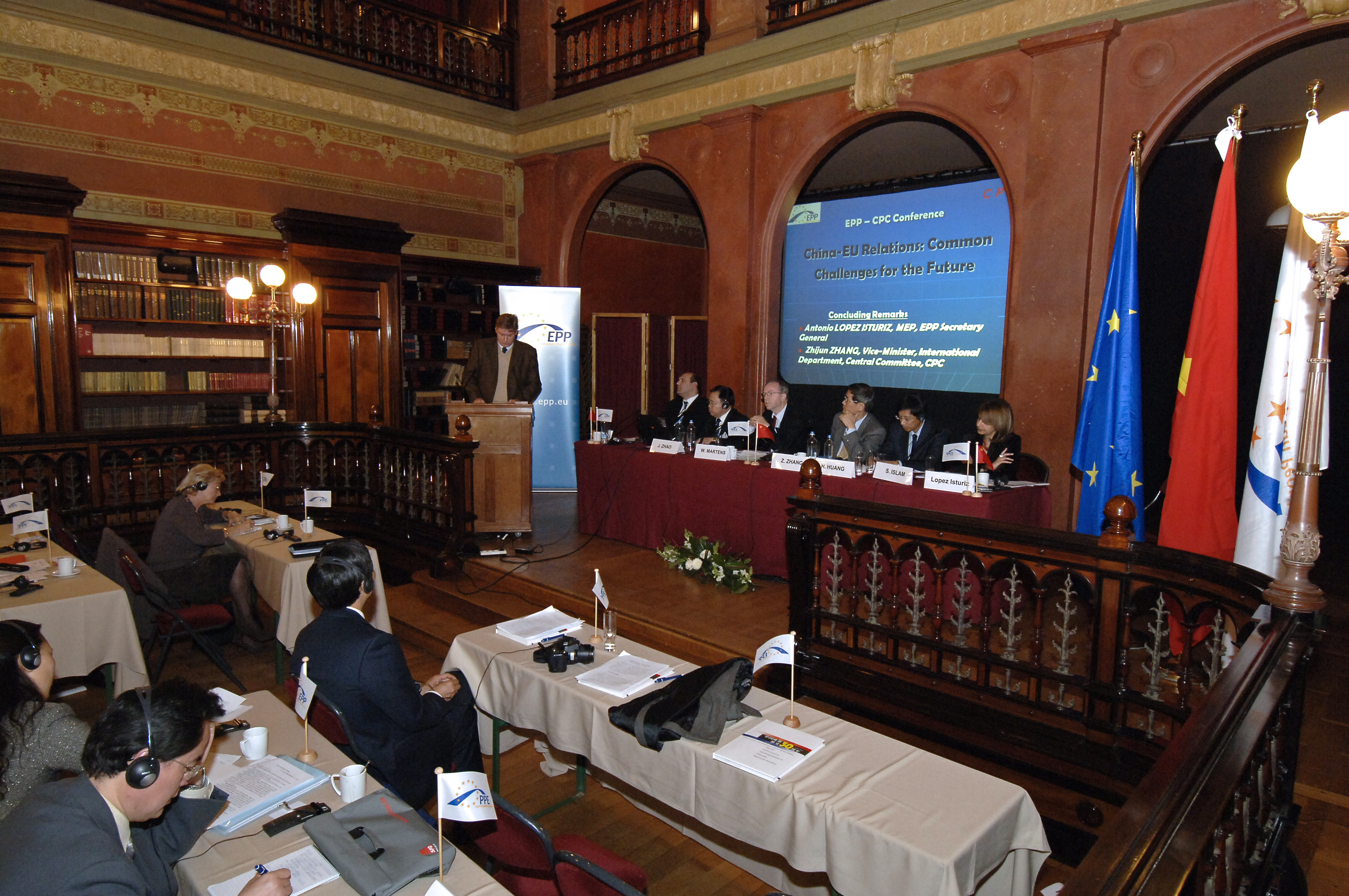
Summit on EU-China relations chaired by Nicos Anastasiades

The Cypriot embassy in Beijing represents close relations between China and Cyprus. This is the consequence of diplomatic trust and mutual respect between the two nations. In 2013, the Cypriot Minister of Defence met the Ambassador of China. The two men praised the strength of the two countries' shared values-based ties during their meeting. They emphasised that the two communities have a long-standing friendship and unity ties, adding that these ties have been strengthened in recent years.

The ambassador of China in Cyprus emphasised the strength of bilateral relations between the two countries. As a permanent member of the UN Security Council, Mr Xinsheng reaffirmed China's support for efforts to find a solution to the Cyprus problem, such as the geopolitical and military conflict with the Turkish Republic of Northern Cyprus, while expressing optimism that the current round of talks would produce results.

Ambassador Liu Yantao met with Cypriot Foreign Minister Nikos Christodoulides on February 24, 2021. Both Ambassador Liu and Minister Christodoulides reaffirmed their commitment to the values of "One Cyprus" and "One China."

Between 2017 and 2019, more than 500 Chinese nationals gained European Union citizenship in Cyprus, including Asia's wealthiest woman.

In 2020, according to the Chinese Embassy in Cyprus, the United States pressured the Nicosia government not to use Chinese 5G networks being pushed worldwide by Huawei and ZTE, which the United States accuses of being a government intelligence outfit.

== Education ==
Mr Costas Kadis, Cyprus' Education Minister, attended the Belt and Road Forum for International (BRF) and signed an agreement on the mutual acknowledgement of higher education titles with Chen Baosheng, China's Education Minister, reaffirming Cyprus' support for China's OBOR Initiative in 2017

China sent 1,013 international students to study in Cyprus in the 2008–2009 academic year.

== China-Cyprus communication during Covid-19 ==
Number of COVID-19 ("Corona") cases in Cyprus.

As China suffered from COVID-19, President Nicos Anastasiades, President of the House of Representatives Demetris Syllouris, and Foreign Minister Nikos Christodoulides wrote letters of condolence and solidarity to the Chinese government.

On April 2, 2020, the Chinese Embassy in Cyprus and Chinese businesses donated medical supplies to Cyprus, including 1,320 safety coveralls, 5,000 KN95 masks, and 5000 disposable medical masks. To help ease the scarcity of medical supplies, the Chinese Embassy in Cyprus has provided 14,000 disposable medical and non-medical masks to the municipality of Pafos, local clinics, schools, and government departments for free.

The second batch of China's medical supplies arrived in Larnaca on 2020 April 11 from a Cypriot chartered flight, along with other Cypriot-purchased items. The Chinese Embassy in Cyprus and Chinese businesses and twin cities contributed 20,600 FFP2 gloves, 110,000 disposable surgical masks, 30,000 non-medical masks, and 500 non-medical safety coveralls in this batch of medical supplies.

The third shipment of China's donation, which includes 5,000 safety coveralls, 417 sets of test kits (for 10,008 people), and 10,000 N95 masks, has been sent on another Cypriot charter flight, along with 50,000 disposable surgical masks donated by a sister city. On April 13, Ambassador Huang Xingyuan and Foreign Minister Nikos Christodoulides will attend a handover ceremony at the Ministry of Foreign Affairs in Nicosia for China's donation to Cyprus.

China has been monitoring the situation in Cyprus since the outbreak of COVID-19 in Europe. As part of the joint prevention and control activities, the Chinese Embassy in Cyprus has been cooperating with the Ministry of Foreign Affairs and the Ministry of Health of Cyprus 24 hours a day, seven days a week. Following the discovery of the first confirmed case on the island, the Chinese Embassy in Cyprus worked closely with Cyprus' competent authorities, facilitating joint efforts by China's Ministry of Foreign Affairs, Ministry of Commerce, China International Development Cooperation Agency, China Customs, and manufacturers in expediting the production, customs declaration, and transportation of medical supplies.

== See also ==
- Foreign relations of China
- Foreign relations of Cyprus
- China–EU relations
