= Jorge Toledo Albiñana =

Spanish diplomat (born 1964)

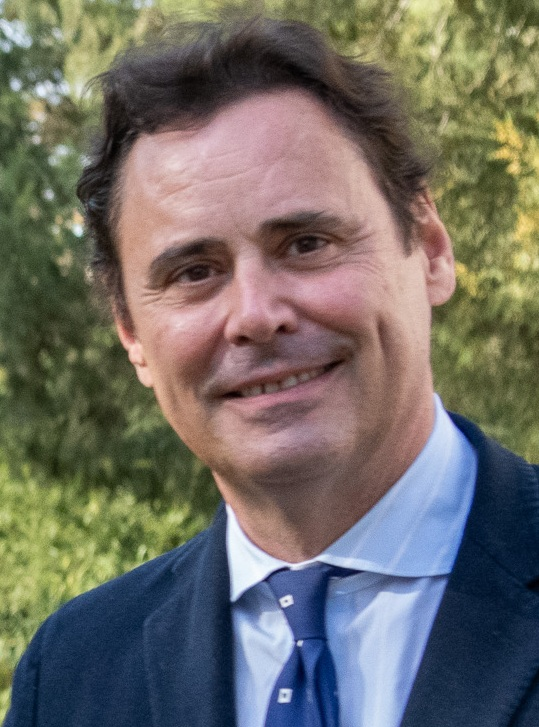
- Born: 21 September 1964 (age 62); Ludwigshafen am Rhein, West Germany
- Education: University of Zaragoza
- Occupation: diplomat

Jorge Toledo Albiñana (Note: In this Spanish name, the first or paternal surname is Toledo and the second or maternal family name is Albiñana.) (born 21 September 1964) is a Spanish diplomat who has served as the European Union ambassador to China since September 2022. He previously served as Spain's ambassador to Japan, and as Secretary of State for the European Union.

Toledo Albiñana was born in Ludwigshafen am Rhein, Germany, in 1964. After graduating in law from the University of Zaragoza, he entered the Diplomatic Career in 1989.

He has been assigned to the Spanish diplomatic representations in India and Japan. He was a technical advisor in the Cabinet of the Minister of Foreign Affairs and in the General Subdirectorate of Industrial, Energy, Transportation and Communications Affairs, and advisory member in the Cabinet of the Secretary of State for Foreign Policy and in the Organizing Committee of the Spanish Presidency of the Council of the European Union. He has been Head of the Technical Office of the Secretary General for European Affairs and in 2005 he was appointed Director of the Cabinet of the Secretary of State for the European Union.

From July 2008 to September 2011 he was Ambassador of Spain in Senegal, being appointed as Ambassador in the Special Mission for Bilateral Affairs of the European Union. He was the architect of the negotiation that led to the adoption of the rule concerning the blocking minority in the Council's votes in the EU Treaties.

Until 2 December 2016, he was an advisor in the Cabinet Office of the Office of the Prime Minister, with the position of Director of the Department of European Affairs and G20. On 2 December 2016, the Council of Ministers appointed him as Secretary of State for the European Union, a position he held until 23 June 2018. During his tenure, the position was briefly renamed Secretary of State for European Affairs.

From October 2018 to February 2022 he had held the position of Ambassador Extraordinary and Plenipotentiary to Japan. Since 1 September 2022, he has served as the European Union ambassador to China.
