= China–Finland relations =

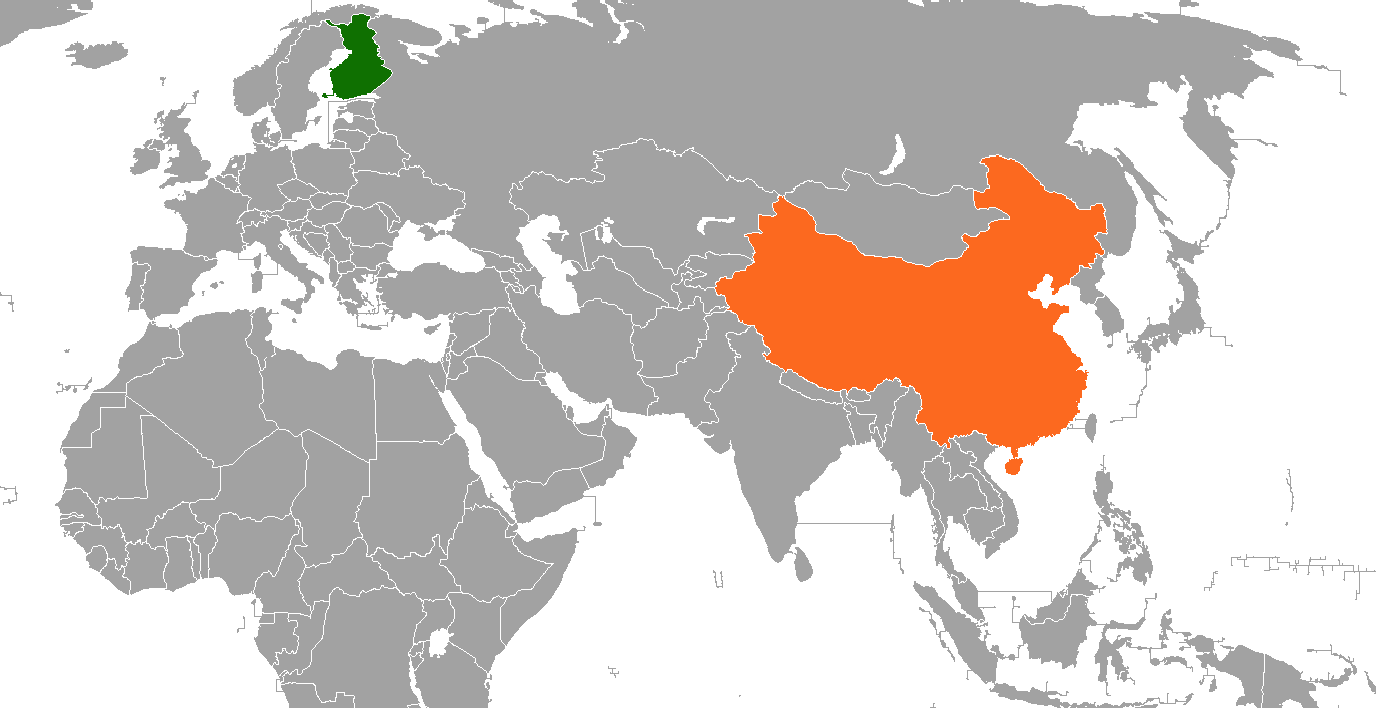
- Finland: China

China–Finland relations are the foreign relations between Finland and China.

== History ==
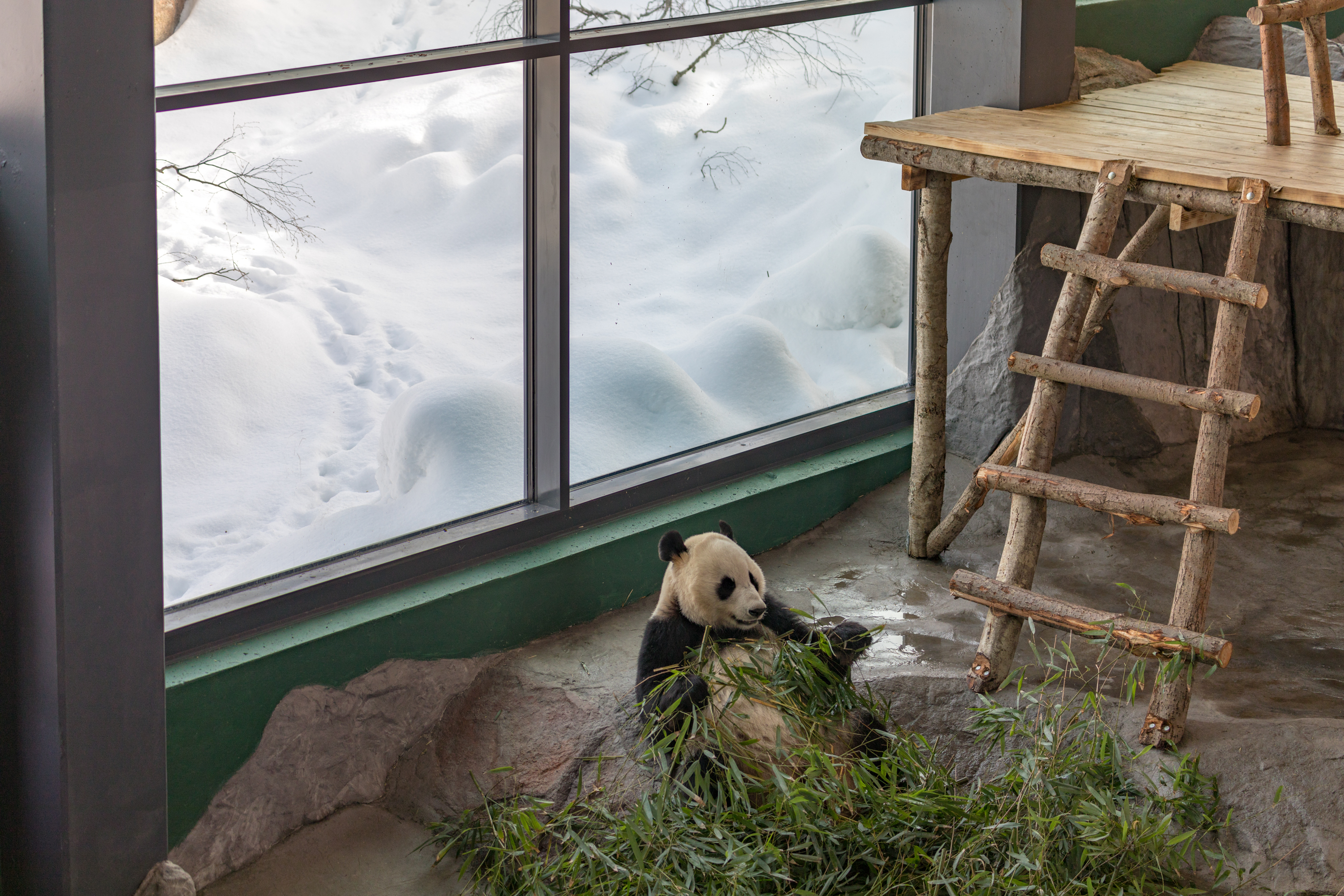
Giant panda in the Ähtäri Zoo that Finland received as a gift from China. The pandas were returned to China in 2024.

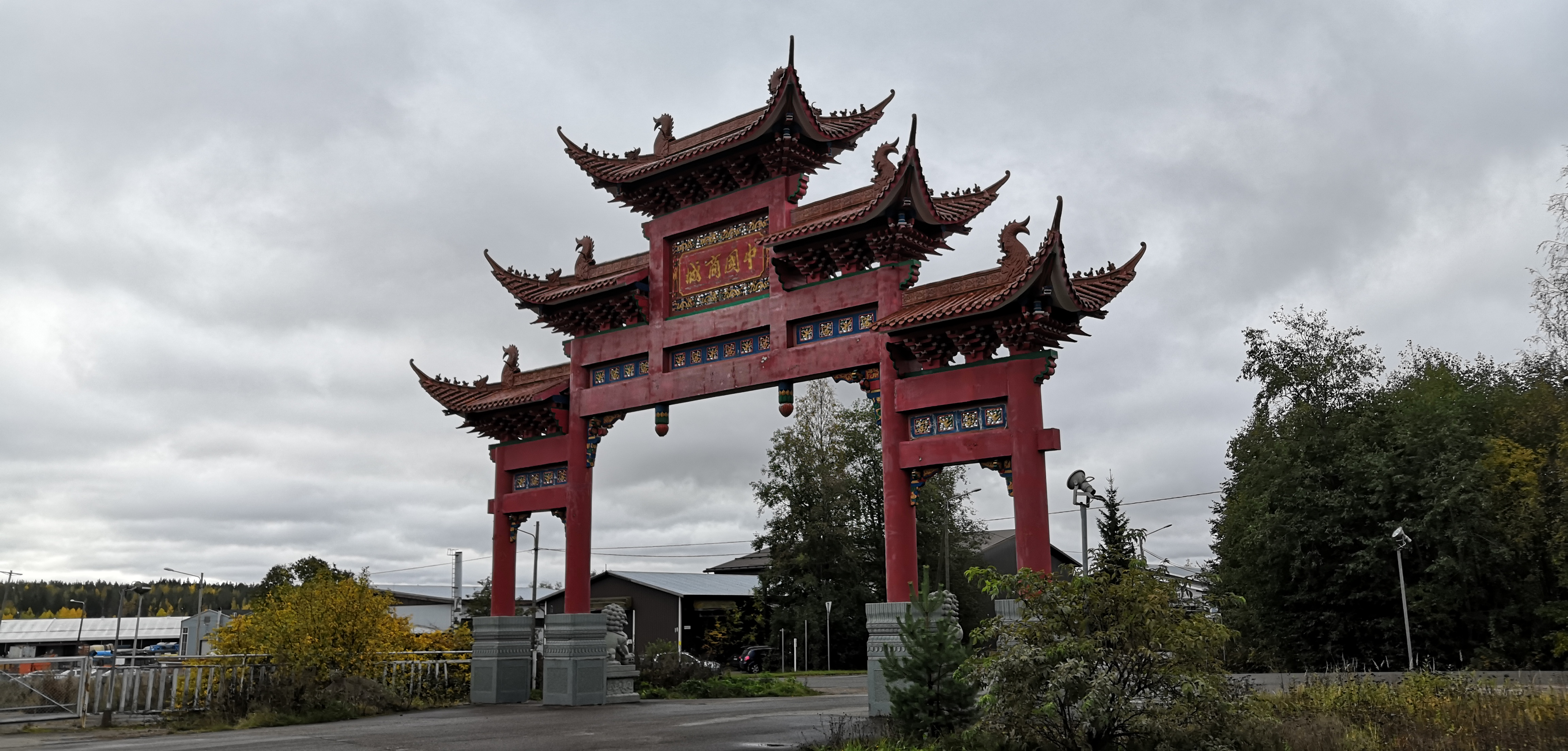
Paifang gate to the former Kouvola's China Center.

Along with Sweden and Denmark, Finland was one of the first Western countries to recognize the People's Republic of China and form diplomatic relations with the country in 1950. The embassy in Beijing was opened in April 1952, and the first resident Finnish ambassador to China, Helge von Knorring, presented his letter of credence to Mao Zedong on 9 May 1952.

Later that same year, an economic department headed by Olavi J. Mattila was opened at the embassy to foster the development of trade relations. As a consequence, Finland became the first capitalist country to sign a bilateral trade agreement with the People's Republic of China in 1953.

These steps, as well as Finland's staunch support for PRC's membership in the UN, formed a solid basis to the nations' relations well into the 1980s. Since the early 1990s, there has been at least one official minister-level state visit from Finland to China each year.

In January 2018, China unveiled its Arctic policy document, which outlined and rationalized Beijing's interests in Arctic matters and details its proposal for a "Polar Silk Road" as a continuation of its Belt and Road Initiative (BRI). However, Finland has not officially engaged in the BRI, notwithstanding the attempts of certain private Finnish organizations to associate themselves with the BRI.

In 2017, Xi Jinping made a visit to Finland. In that same year, China leased two giant pandas to Ähtäri Zoo as a gesture of goodwill and friendship to commemorate Finland's centenary of independence. This act was recognized at the time as a furtherance of China's 'panda diplomacy'. However, the financial challenges faced by the zoo led to the pandas' premature departure in 2024. Julie Yu-Wen Chen, a professor at the University of Helsinki, noted that this “was not a diplomatic failure but a case in which non‑state actors engaged with China on overly simplistic terms, without fully considering the broader economic, political, and diplomatic implications.”

President of the Republic of Finland, Alexander Stubb, paid a state visit to China from 28 to 31 October 2024. President Stubb met President of China, Xi Jinping, in Beijing.

In November 2024, Finnish authorities investigated a Chinese shipping vessel, the Yi Peng 3, in the Baltic Sea after it was found in the vicinity of two severed undersea fiber-optic data cables and suspected of sabotage.

== Human rights ==
=== Hong Kong national security law ===
In June 2020, Finland openly opposed the Hong Kong national security law.

== Trade ==
Finland and China have had an agreement on economic, industrial, scientific and technological co-operation since 1973, and the agreement was last revised in 2005. The two principal trade organizations between the countries are Finland–China Trade Association and the China Council for Promotion of International Trade (CCPIT).

One of the fastest growing areas of trade between the two countries is in environmental protection and information technology.

== Spying in Finland ==
China and Russia are suspected of large-scale spying of the IT networks at the Finnish Ministry for Foreign Affairs. The spying focused on data traffic between Finland and the European Union, and is believed to have continued for four years. The spying was uncovered in spring 2013, with the Finnish Security Intelligence Service (Supo) investigating the breach.

In March 2021, the Finnish Security and Intelligence Service said China's Ministry of State Security via the APT31 hacking group had targeted the country's parliament in a cyber attack. In March 2024, Finnish police confirmed that APT31 breached the Parliament of Finland in March 2021.

== See also ==
- Foreign relations of China
- Foreign relations of Finland
