= Comprehensive Agreement on Investment =

Proposed investment agreement between the European Union and China

The European Union and China.

The Comprehensive Agreement on Investment (CAI) is a proposed investment deal between the People's Republic of China and the European Union. Proposed in 2013, the deal has not been signed as of 2 February 2026. In December 2020, the European Commission announced that the agreement was concluded in principle by the leaders of the European Council, pending ratification by the European Parliament.

In March 2021, however, it was reported that there would be serious doubts about the approval of the deal in the European Parliament given China's "unacceptable" behavior toward members of the parliament, the European Council's Political and Security Committee, and European think tanks.

== Significance ==
The deal is "the most ambitious agreement that China has ever concluded" by significantly opening up its internal market to EU companies. For example, China has agreed to eliminate joint venture requirements, forced transfer of technologies, equity caps, and quantitative restrictions in a number of sectors in which most of the EU's businesses in China operate. It will also protect EU foreign direct investment (FDI) in China. In the manufacturing sector, where half of EU FDI is, China will "match the EU's openness"; a concession that had previously been unprecedented in Chinese trade or investment agreements, and which is viewed as a significant step towards market liberalisation in China.

== Controversies and debates ==
=== Strain in US–EU relations ===
Especially among US analysts and politicians, the announcement sparked a "firestorm of criticism" towards the EU for not consulting the United States before. The European Parliament has published a briefing in which the US' trade deal with China is mentioned as a reason for the EU seeking similar trade concessions from China, although "it is too early to judge whether the systemic issues tackled in the Trump Administration's 2020 US-China Phase One Deal will actually be enforced", and "it will be a tall order for the EU to obtain far-reaching concessions from China in the CAI negotiations." Critics, including a few lawmakers and China watchers in Europe and the US, have accused EU leaders of being naive in agreeing to the deal or trusting China on issues such as sustainable development.

Some US commentators say it may damage relations with the US as the EU hands China a political win at the expense of incoming president Joe Biden. In December 2020, Jake Sullivan, Biden's national security adviser, said he would welcome "early consultation" with Europe on China. Nevertheless, instead of holding off for Biden to take office to devise a common approach toward China, the EU agreed to the deal anyway. Biden has argued that with his administration, the US is "at the head of the table again", which, according to some Europeans, might be viewed as a threat to the EU's goal of strategic autonomy by expecting the EU to go back to the status quo ante and "play second-fiddle to Washington".

The EU retorted that the US-China Phase One Trade Deal, which the Biden administration has vowed to continue, has given America advantages over the EU in terms of trade and investment with China. Brussels insisted that it is merely striving for similar benefits to those established in US-China trade deal. Valdis Dombrovskis, the EU's trade commissioner, has argued that CAI will prevent EU companies from being put at a disadvantage by the US-China trade deal. He did not see the signing of either trade deal as hindering the co-operation between the EU and the US.

=== Opposition to the ratification ===
In March 2021, in a joint action with the US, UK and Canada, the EU imposed sanctions on four Chinese officials who are believed to be linked to the alleged human rights abuses happening in the Chinese region of Xinjiang. This led to immediate Chinese counter-sanctions on 4 EU entities and 10 EU officials, of which 5 are members of the European Parliament (MEPs).

Politico reported that prominent MEPs were pushing against the ratification of the investment pact after China responded with these counter-sanctions. Reinhard Bütikofer, the chair of the parliament's delegation for relations with China, who was hit by the Chinese sanctions, said, "The fate of this deal is very much in question." France summoned China's ambassador over "unacceptable" insults and Beijing's sanctions. On 24 March, Dombrovskis, the EU's trade commissioner, warned China, saying that the “ratification process cannot be separated from the evolving dynamics of the wider EU-China relationship”, also referring to these counter-sanctions.

Political scientist David Camroux wrote in the Financial Times that China had made several important concessions in the CAI negotiations to get the deal signed in advance of US president Biden's inauguration, and that it is now intentionally using these counter-sanctions to dissuade MEPs from ratifying it, giving China a way of backing away from these concessions while still being able to show "its good multilateral intentions".

=== Support to ratification ===
The chancellor of Germany Olaf Scholz, said he hoped the CAI "will take effect as soon as possible", despite the block by the European Parliament over a sanctions dispute.

In June 2021, it was reported that the investment deal remains possible to be ratified after 2023.

== See also ==
- China–European Union relations
- United States–European Union relations
- China–United States relations
