= China–Malta relations =

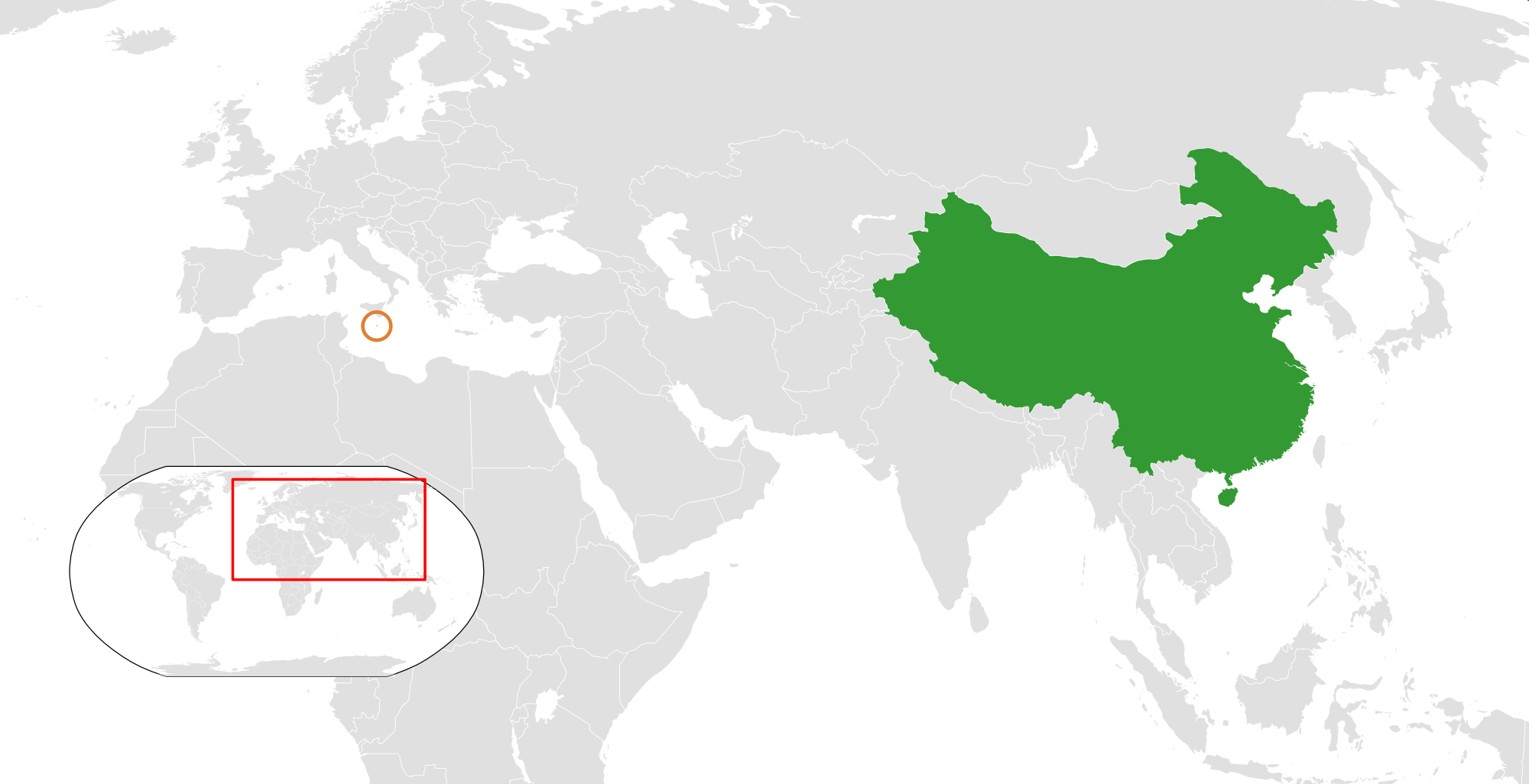
- China: Malta

The People's Republic of China and the Republic of Malta established diplomatic relations on 31 January 1972.

Malta joined the Belt and Road Initiative (BRI) in 2018.

== Bilateral trade ==
As of February 2017, China was Malta's ninth largest source of imports and its thirteenth largest export market. In January–February 2017, the bilateral trade volume between Malta and China was US$34.706 million, a decrease of 3.5%. Among them, Malta's exports to China were US$5.838 million, a decrease of 0.2%, accounting for 1.8% of its total exports; Malta's imports from China were US$28.868 million, a decrease of 4.1%, accounting for 3.4% of its total imports. Malta's trade deficit was US$23.029 million, a decrease of 5%.

In 2016, electromechanical products were Malta's main export to China, accounting for 80.7% of total exports. The next largest export was plastics and rubber, food, beverages, tobacco and other products. The main imports from China to Malta were electromechanical products (36%), chemical products (19.4%), and furniture and toys (7.8%).

== Friendly exchanges ==
- Following the Sichuan earthquake in 2008, Malta sent a message of condolence, and Prime Minister Lawrence Gonzi, Speaker of Parliament Louis Galea, and Deputy Prime Minister and Foreign Minister Tonio Borg personally visited the Chinese Embassy in Malta to offer their condolences. Malta also provided China with 100 tents and a donation of €46,000.
- In February 2011, during China's evacuation operation from Libya following the outbreak of the First Libyan Civil War, nearly 5,000 Chinese nationals were safely and orderly evacuated back to Malta.
- China and Malta began medical and health cooperation in 1984. In the 1990s, China established the first TCM center in the Mediterranean region and Europe in Malta, providing treatment to nearly 5,000 patients annually.

== See also ==
- Foreign relations of China
- Foreign relations of Malta
