= Luxembourg in the Korean War =

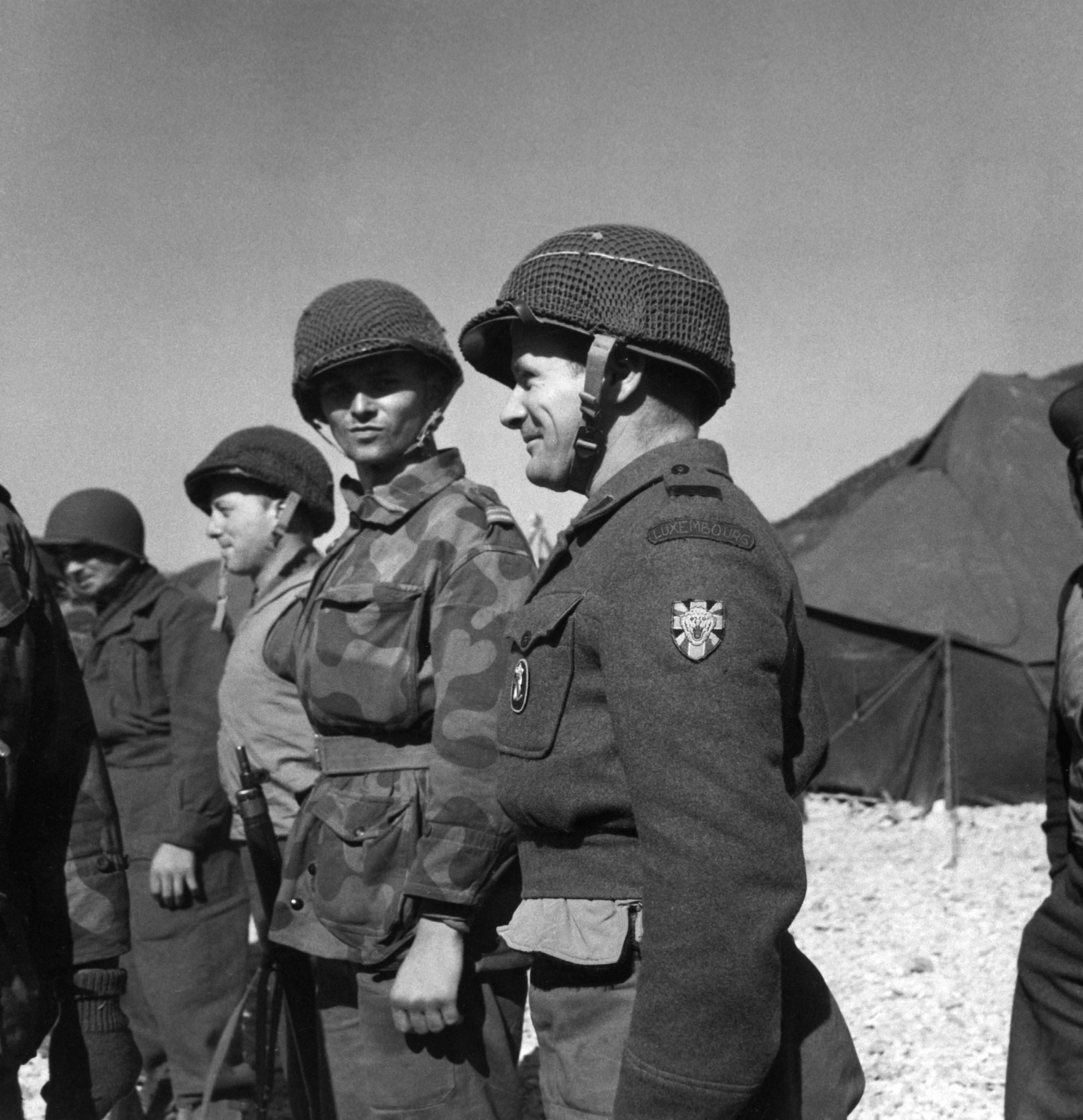
A Luxembourgish soldier in Korea, 1953.

In support of the United Nations Command, Luxembourg sent 110 troops to fight in Korea. Of these, two were killed and 17 were wounded. Luxembourg decided to ally with the Belgians and form 1st Platoon A Company, and with the Belgians arrived in Korea on 31 January 1951. Many Luxembourgers decided to join the Belgian Volunteer Corps for Korea. Luxembourg would fight at Imjin River, Haktang-ni, and Chatkol. Luxembourg contributed a 44-man rifle regiment called the Royal Luxembourg Regiment. The Luxembourgers left Korea in January 1953 (The Belgian Volunteer Corps did not leave Korea until the end of the war.)

== Arrival in Korea ==
The Luxembourg Detachment attached to the Belgian Volunteer Corps arrived in Pusan (Busan) on 31 January 1951. They moved north and would help defend the Imjin River in the Northwestern sector of South Korea during the Chinese Spring Offensive.

== Battle of Imjin River ==
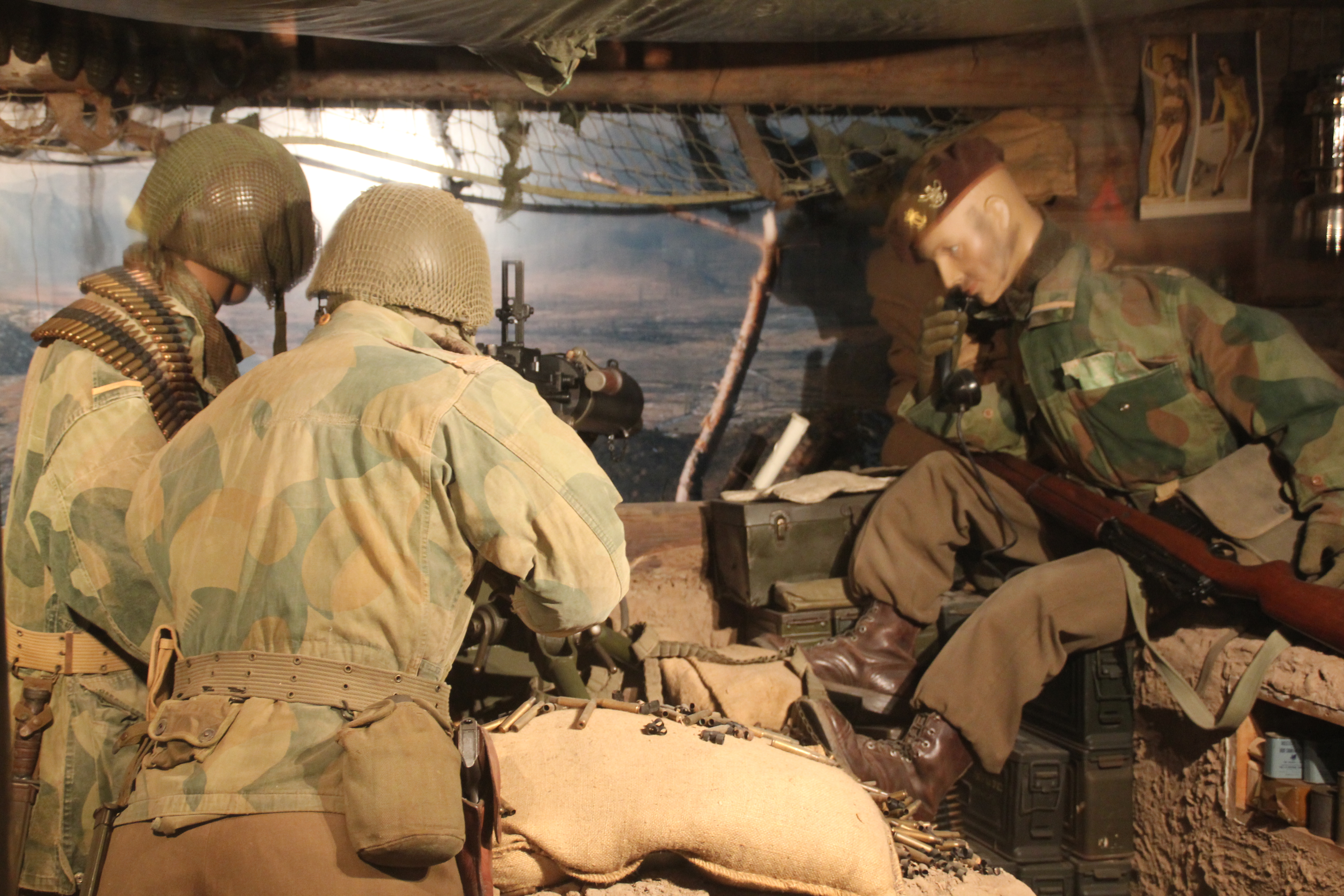
Diorama of Luxembourg defences at the Battle of Injin River

On the night of 22 April 1951, PVA forces were advancing around the Luxembourger-Belgian positions on Hill 194. These forces were ordered to take the two bridges that the Luxembourgers-Belgians depended on and cross the river. The British 29th Brigade were trying to secure the crossing but were engaged by PVA (People's Volunteer Army) forces trying to cross the river. If the bridge was controlled by the PVA forces, the Belgian Volunteer Corps and Luxembourg Detachment would be at risk of being isolated from the rest of the 29th Brigade. An initial PVA patrol began attacking the Luxembourgish-Belgian positions on the Hill. On the morning of 23 April, the Luxembourgish and Belgians, with support from the Gloucestershire Regiment, began withdrawing from Hill 194. The Gloucestershire Regiment gave the Luxembourgers-Belgians time to retreat across the two bridges.

=== Retreat of the 29th Brigade ===
As PVA forces began to flood into the area, the 29th Brigade was ordered to retreat back to a new defensive position. While the 29th Brigade Command Post was trying to move back to the new defensive position, the Belgians and Luxembourgers occupied blocking positions west and southwest of the Command Post.

== Battle of Haktang-ni ==
The Luxembourg-Belgium Contingent arrived at Haktang-ni at 19:00 (7:00 p.m.) on 10 October 1951. On 11 October, the Chinese began firing artillery on the defense positions that the Contingent had set up. The Chinese began attacking the Luxembourg-Belgian detachments positions on the morning of 12 October. Several small assaults were repelled by the Belgian Volunteer Corps. Patrols were sent out between 08:00 and 15:00 (3:00 p.m.). The patrols found that nearby Hill 488 was being used as an observation post by PVA forces. On the morning of 13 October, as the fog lifted, the main PVA attack had begun.

=== Main attack by the PVA ===
The Chinese attacked the Heavy Weapons Company. At the same time the HQ position of the Volunteer Corps was overrun for a brief period of time. At 02:00, renewed PVA assaults began on the Heavy Weapons Company. The Reconnaissance Platoon moved in complete silence. They moved under the barbed wire when they were under fire by PVA machine guns and flamethrowers. At 04:00, the Chinese withdrew from their attack and back to their original positions. The Chinese would still send small assaults against the Luxembourg-Belgian Volunteer Corps.

== Battle of Chatkol ==
From 8–9 March 1953, Luxembourg-Belgian defenses were vulnerable at Outpost Carol. Outpost Carol was run by 7 soldiers and 2 machine-guns when it was overrun by 100 PVA soldiers. The Luxembourger-Belgian soldiers didn't get time to react because after Outpost Carol was taken, the Chinese launched an artillery barrage.

On 13 March 1953, Outpost Alice was attacked at 00:15. It began with an artillery bombardment and then a massed PVA assault on Outpost Alice. When the soldiers at Outpost Alice were attacked, one soldier was lost in the retreat back to the front line. The missing soldier was eventually found and sent a Mobile Army Surgical Hospital (MASH).

Realizing on 7–8 April, Corporal Raymond Beringer of the Luxembourg Platoon, that a PVA breakthrough was possible. A company moved his machine gun to the top of his bunker to allow for a better field of fire. At the end of the battle on 9 April, 20 bodies of the PVA forces were found within 200 metres of the bunker. For this action, Corporal Beringer was awarded the American Bronze Star and recommended for the Silver Star.

== End of the Korean War (27 July 1953) ==
On 27 July 1953, an armistice was signed between South Korea and North Korea. Most UN divisions left Korea. About three divisions stayed in Korea to help rebuild South Korea. The Belgian Volunteer Corps was dismantled in 1955.

== Timeline of events and battles Luxembourg participated in ==
Events Luxembourg participated in during the Korean War:
Battle/Event	Year
Arrival in Pusan	31 January 1951
Training	31 January - 20 April 1951
Battle of Imjin River	22–25 April 1951
Battle of Haktang-ni	10–13 October 1951
Battle of Chatkol	8–13 March 1953, 8–9 April 1953
End of the Korean War	27 July 1953

== Memorials ==
A memorial was erected at Dongducheon, South Korea to the Luxembourg Detachment of the Belgian Volunteer Corps, and the Volunteer Corps itself.

== Popular culture ==
The television show M*A*S*H (1972-1983), had an episode (A Full Rich Day, S03E12) which included a wounded Luxembourgish lieutenant being aided by the 4077.

== See also ==
- Belgian Volunteer Corps for Korea
- United Nations Forces in the Korean War
- Medical support in the Korean War
- Australia in the Korean War
- Canada in the Korean War
- Korean War
