= China–Luxembourg relations =

- China: Luxembourg

The People's Republic of China (PRC) and Luxembourg officially established diplomatic relations on November 16, 1972.

== History ==
Luxembourg established official diplomatic relations with the Nationalist government of the Republic of China (ROC) in 1949. After the establishment of the People's Republic of China (PRC) and the ROC's loss in the Chinese Civil War, Luxembourg continued to recognize the ROC government as a recognized representative of China. During the Korean War, Luxembourg sent soldiers to fight with the Belgian Volunteer Corps for Korea against North Korea and the PRC's People's Volunteer Army.

In November 1972, the government of Luxembourg switched recognition from the ROC to the PRC. Mutual visits commenced in the 1980s with the Grand Duke of Luxembourg visiting China and the high-ranking officials of the State Council of the People's Republic of China visited Luxembourg.

In 1989, Luxembourg followed the European Union and imposed sanctions on China. Relations gradually improved from 1991 onwards.

== Economic relations ==
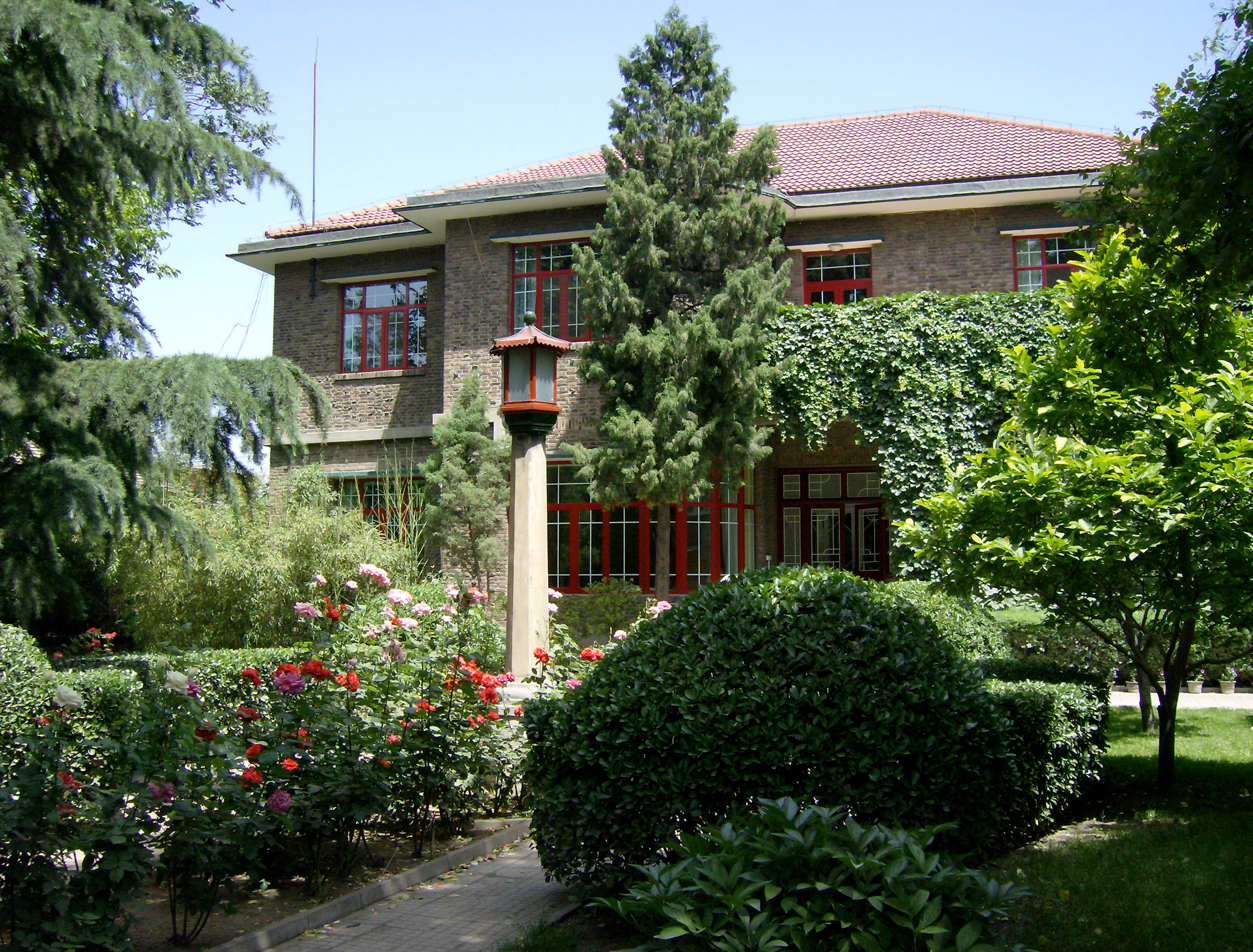
Embassy of Luxembourg in China

The trade value between the two countries stood at $101 million in 2002.

Luxembourg exported steel material, mechanic and electric products to China. Chinese exports to Luxembourg comprise textile, garments, plastic products and toys.

Sino-Luxembourg trade relations have also focused on reducing trade barriers to investments. In March 2019, Luxembourg signed an agreement with China to cooperate on its Belt and Road Initiative, making it one of only a few Western European nations to do so.

== Human rights criticisms ==
=== Hong Kong national security law ===
In June 2020, Luxembourg openly opposed the Hong Kong national security law.

== See also ==
- Foreign relations of China
- Foreign relations of Luxembourg
