= Ähtäri Zoo =

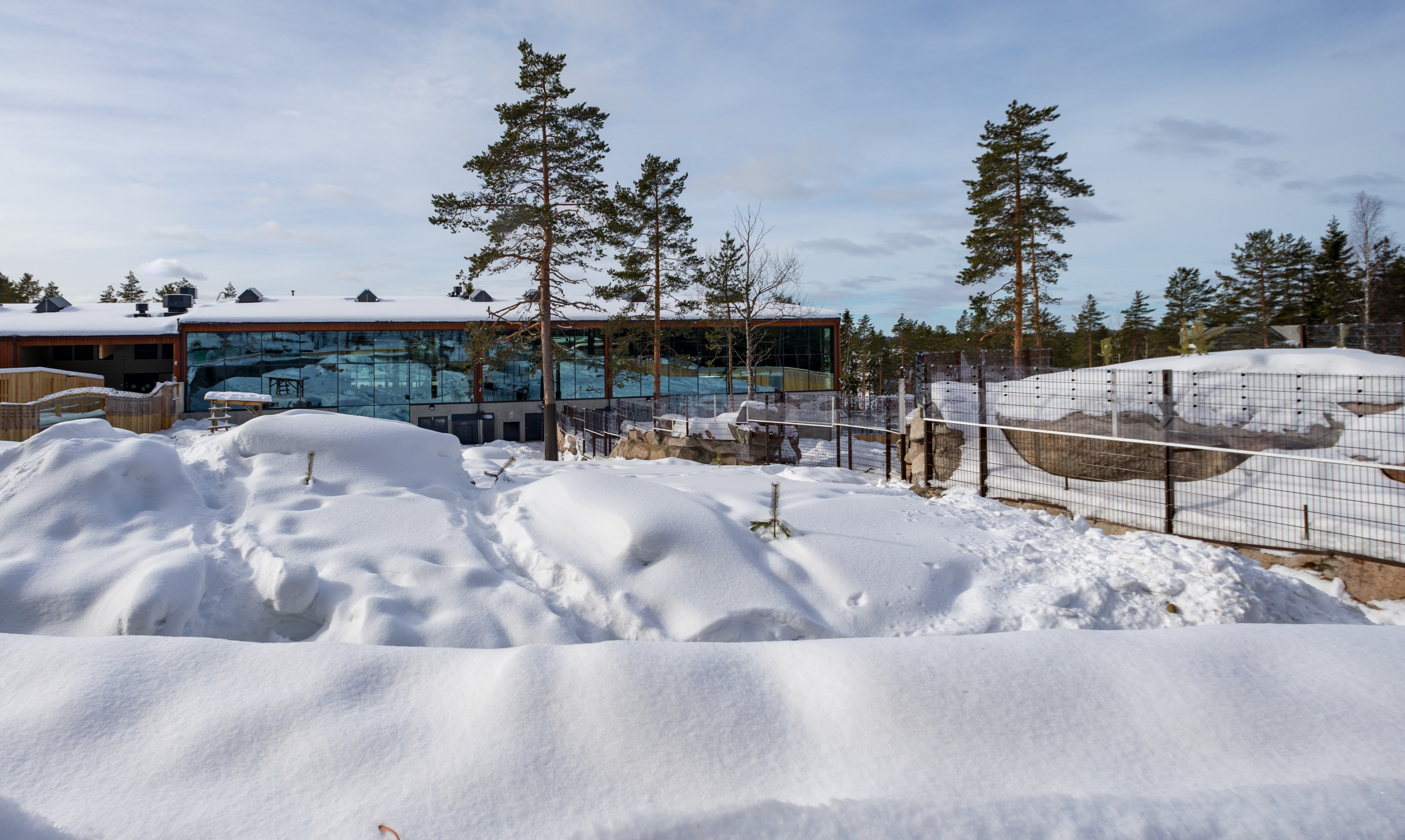
- The Snowpanda House of Ähtäri Zoo, March 2018
- Interactive map of Ähtäri Zoo
- 62°32′20″N 024°10′34″E
- Date opened: 1973
- Location: Ähtäri, Finland
- Land area: 60 hectares (150 acres)
- No. of animals: 300
- No. of species: 60+
- Memberships: EAZA
- Website: ahtarizoo.fi/en

Ähtäri Zoo is a 60-hectare (150-acre) zoo in Ähtäri, Finland. The zoo was founded in 1973 and closed in the fall of 2025 due to the bankruptcy of its parent company, Ähtärin Eläinpuisto Oy. A new company, Mesi Zoo Oy, began operating the zoo in February 2026 in cooperation with nonprofit organization Vieraile ja Välität ry, which is responsible for the care of the animals.

== History ==
Köpi the moose was the first animal at the zoo. After several years, wolves and lynxes were added. However, the zoo's most famous residents are probably the bears, Santeri and his mate Santra, who have lived at the zoo almost since its founding. In 2003, the Korkeasaari Zoo in Helsinki gifted snow leopards to Ähtäri Zoo to celebrate their 30th anniversary and the following year Ähtäri Zoo was accepted to be a mamber of EAZA. By 2006, there were 65 animals, mostly from the coniferous zone.

=== Pandas ===
During Chinese leader Xi Jinping's visit to Finland on April 5, 2017, China and Finland signed an agreement on bilateral cooperation in areas such as cooperative research on giant pandas, agreeing to lease a pair of giant pandas to Finland for a period of 15 years. Arriving in Finland at the end of 2017, the pandas were anticipated to live at the Ähtäri Zoo. For this purpose, the zoo spent 8 million euros to build the panda house. Arriving at Helsinki-Vantaa Airport on January 18, 2018, the male and female giant pandas were subsequently driven to the Ähtäri Zoo, roughly 300 kilometers north of Helsinki.

In 2024, Ähtäri Zoo decided to return these two giant pandas to China eight years early, saying it could no longer afford to look after them.

=== Financial problems and new start ===
The pandas caused financial problems for the zoo, which led to bankruptcy and the closure of the zoo in October 2025.

The property and its animals were sold for one euro to Vieraile ja Välität ry, an association founded in 2019 that aims to raise funds and care for the animals. The number of animals was reduced by transferring them elsewhere, and arrangements were made to find a new home for all the animals unless a way to continue the zoo's operations could be found.

In February 2026, a new company, Mesi Zoo Oy, was registered and announced that it would take over responsibility for the zoo's operations. The new company is debt-free. Vieraile ja Välität ry continues to care for the animals and invoices the new company for its work. The new Ähtäri Mesizoo opened on February 16, 2026.

== Animals ==
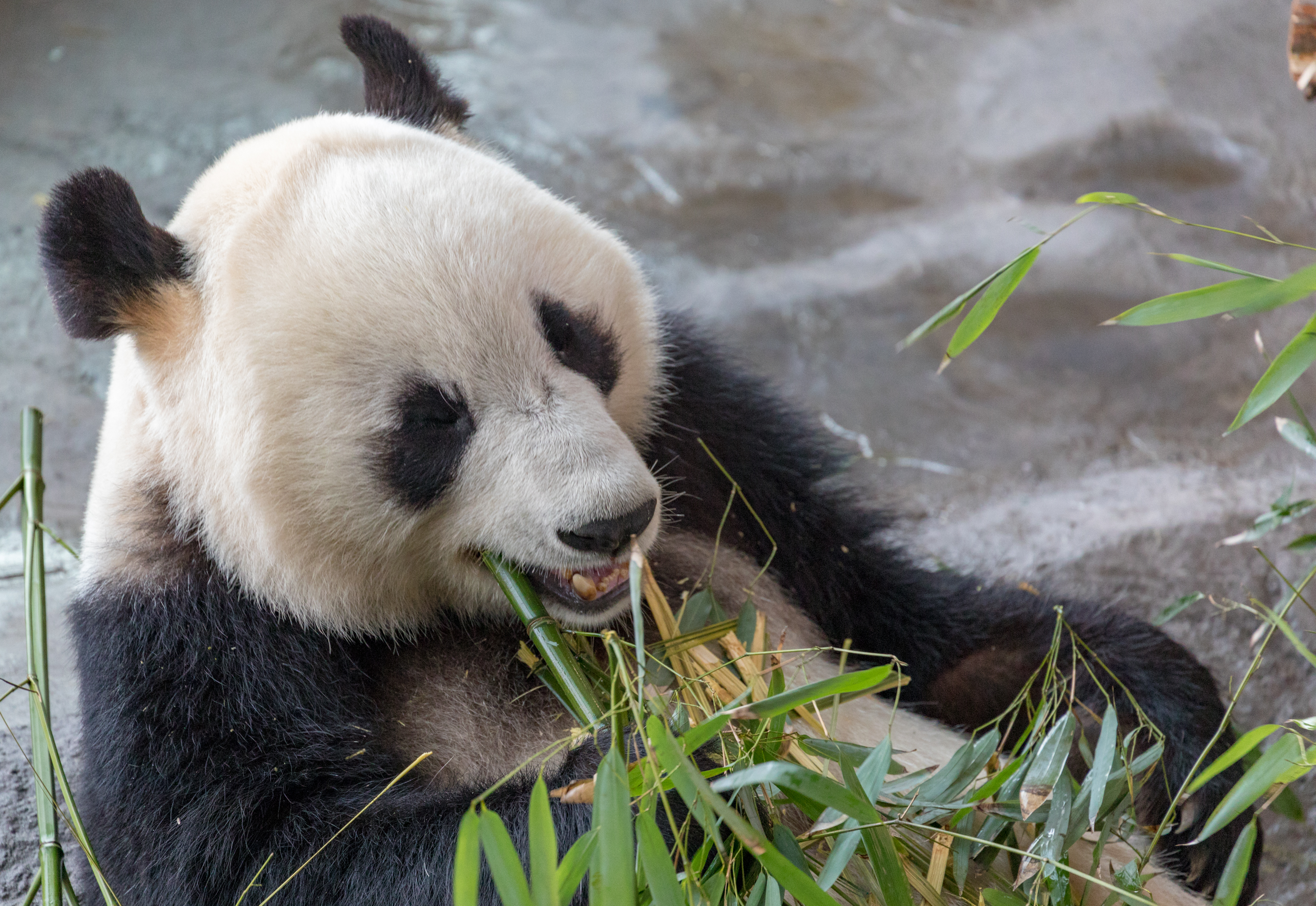
Giant panda in Ähtäri Zoo

Animals at the zoo include snow leopards, wolves, bears, wolverines, lynx, foxes, otters, beavers, European bison, wild boar, roe deer, fallow deer, reindeer, white-tailed deer, snowy owls, eagle owls, and waterfowl.
