= List of diplomatic missions in China =

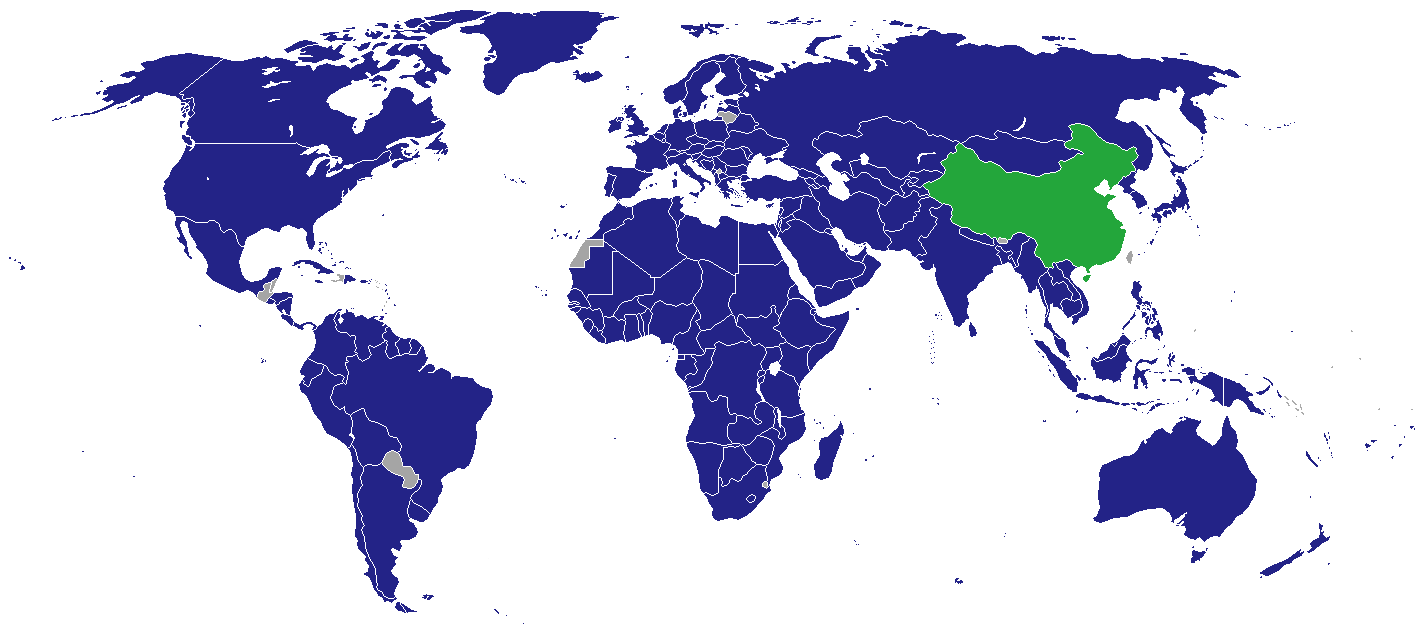
Map of countries that maintain diplomatic missions in the People's Republic of China

This is a list of diplomatic missions in the People's Republic of China, excluding Hong Kong and Macau. Due to the One-China policy, the PRC is recognized by 179 out of 193 United Nations member states and the State of Palestine as its sovereignty is disputed by the Republic of China. As the world's second-most populous country, the world's largest economy by PPP, and a major great power, as well as an emerging superpower, China is a permanent member of the United Nations Security Council, with a recognized nuclear power state and the world's largest standing army. In 2019, China had the largest diplomatic network in the world.

China hosts a large diplomatic community in its capital city of Beijing, which hosts 176 embassies, with numerous countries maintaining consulates general and consulates throughout the country.

Honorary consulates in the special administrative regions of Hong Kong and Macau are omitted in this listing.

== Diplomatic missions in Beijing ==
=== Embassies ===
1. Afghanistan
2. Albania
3. Algeria
4. Angola
5. Antigua and Barbuda
6. Argentina
7. Armenia
8. Australia
9. Austria
10. Azerbaijan
11. Bahamas
12. Bahrain
13. Bangladesh
14. Barbados
15. Belarus
16. Belgium
17. Benin
18. Bolivia
19. Bosnia and Herzegovina
20. Botswana
21. Brazil
22. Brunei
23. Bulgaria
24. Burkina Faso
25. Burundi
26. Cambodia
27. Cameroon
28. Canada
29. Cape Verde
30. Central African Republic
31. Chad
32. Chile
33. Colombia
34. Comoros
35. Congo-Brazzaville
36. Congo-Kinshasa
37. Costa Rica
38. Croatia
39. Cuba
40. Cyprus
41. Czechia
42. Denmark
43. Djibouti
44. Dominica
45. Dominican Republic
46. Ecuador
47. Egypt
48. El Salvador
49. Equatorial Guinea
50. Eritrea
51. Estonia
52. Ethiopia
53. Fiji
54. Finland
55. France
56. Gabon
57. Gambia
58. Georgia
59. Germany
60. Ghana
61. Greece
62. Grenada
63. Guinea
64. Guinea-Bissau
65. Guyana
66. Honduras
67. Hungary
68. Iceland
69. India
70. Indonesia
71. Iran
72. Iraq
73. Ireland
74. Israel
75. Italy
76. Ivory Coast
77. Jamaica
78. Japan
79. Jordan
80. Kazakhstan
81. Kenya
82. Kiribati
83. Kuwait
84. Kyrgyzstan
85. Laos
86. Latvia
87. Lebanon
88. Lesotho
89. Liberia
90. Libya
91. Luxembourg
92. Madagascar
93. Malawi
94. Malaysia
95. Maldives
96. Mali
97. Malta
98. Mauritania
99. Mauritius
100. Mexico
101. Micronesia
102. Moldova
103. Mongolia
104. Montenegro
105. Morocco
106. Mozambique
107. Myanmar
108. Namibia
109. Nauru
110. Nepal
111. Netherlands
112. New Zealand
113. Nicaragua
114. Niger
115. Nigeria
116. North Korea
117. North Macedonia
118. Norway
119. Oman
120. Pakistan
121. Palestine
122. Panama
123. Papua New Guinea
124. Peru
125. Philippines
126. Poland
127. Portugal
128. Qatar
129. Romania
130. Russia
131. Rwanda
132. Samoa
133. São Tomé and Príncipe
134. Saudi Arabia
135. Senegal
136. Serbia
137. Seychelles
138. Sierra Leone
139. Singapore
140. Slovakia
141. Slovenia
142. Solomon Islands
143. Somalia
144. South Africa
145. South Korea
146. South Sudan
147. Spain
148. Sri Lanka
149. Sudan
150. Suriname
151. Sweden
152. Switzerland
153. Syria
154. Tajikistan
155. Tanzania
156. Thailand
157. Timor-Leste
158. Togo
159. Tonga
160. Trinidad and Tobago
161. Tunisia
162. Turkey
163. Turkmenistan
164. Uganda
165. Ukraine
166. United Arab Emirates
167. United Kingdom
168. United States
169. Uruguay
170. Uzbekistan
171. Vanuatu
172. Venezuela
173. Vietnam
174. Yemen
175. Zambia
176. Zimbabwe

=== Other Delegations or Missions ===
1. African Union (Mission)
2. Arab League (Mission)
3. European Union (Delegation)
4. Faroe Islands (Representative Office)
5. Haiti (Office of Commercial Development)
6. Hong Kong, China - Office of the Government of the Hong Kong Special Administrative Region in Beijing
7. Lithuania (Representative Office)
8. Macau, China - Office of the Macau Special Administrative Region in Beijing
9. UN (Resident Coordinator's Office)
10. UN (United Nations Development Programme)

== Gallery ==
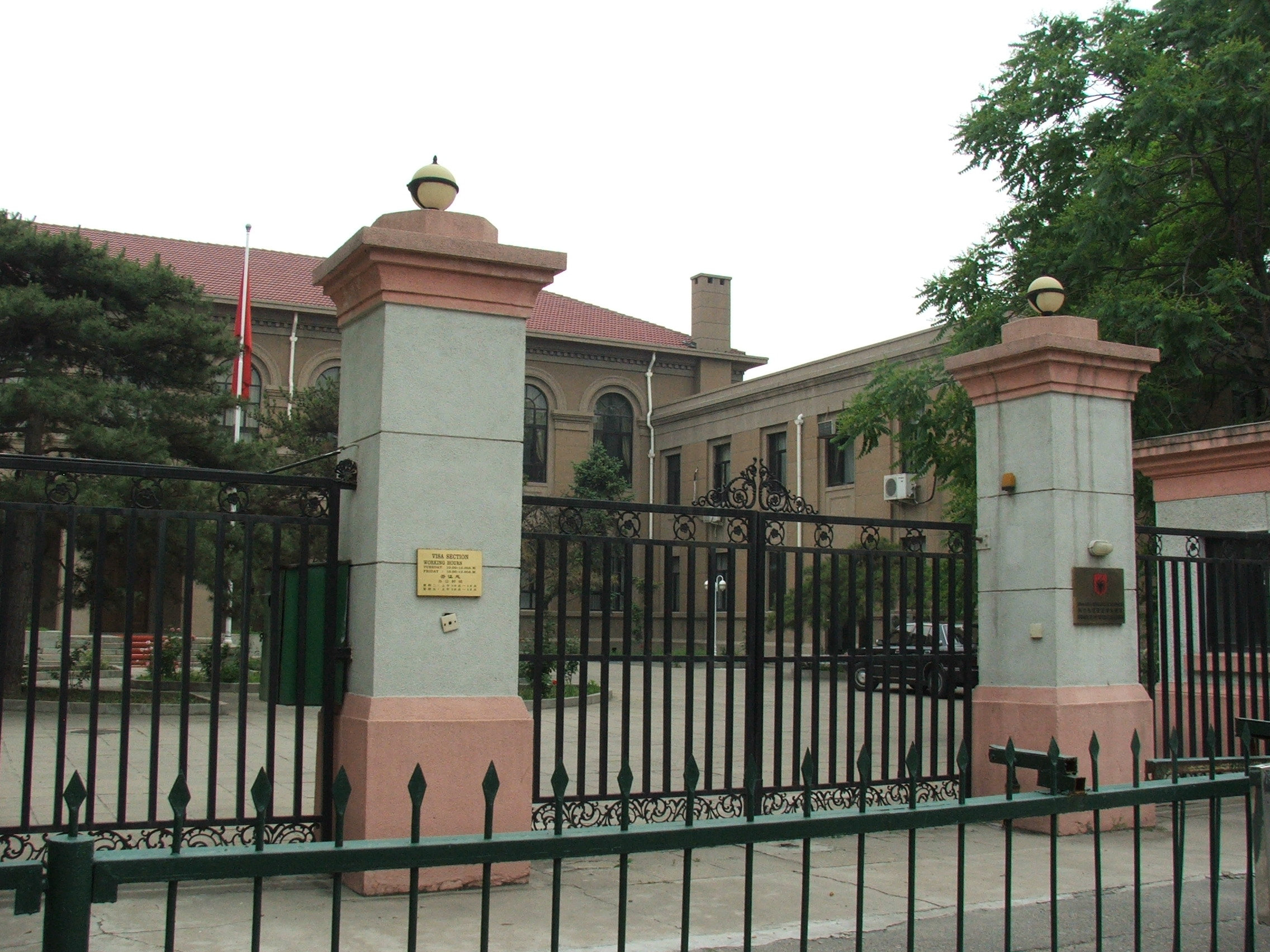
Embassy of Albania

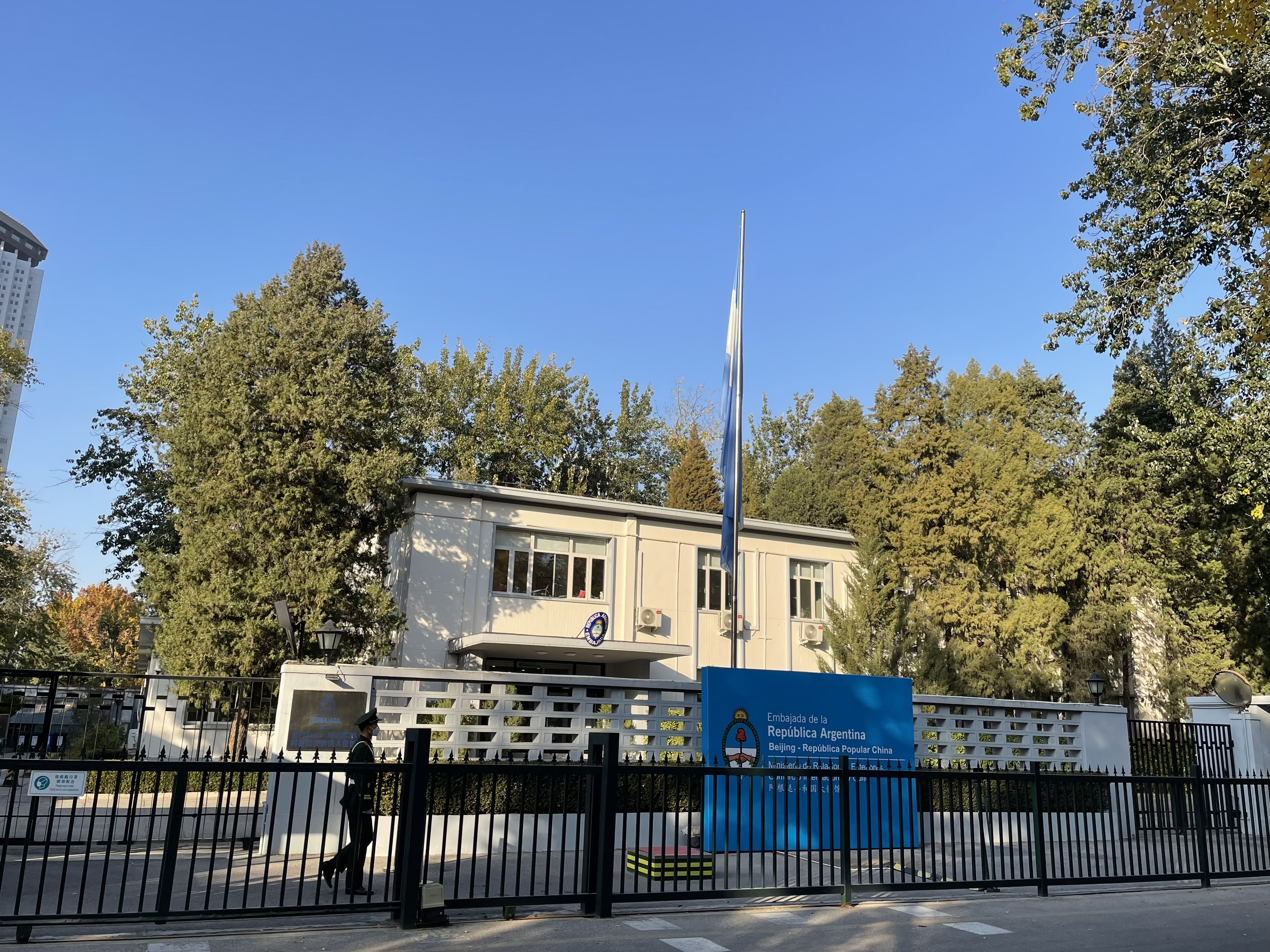
Embassy of Argentina

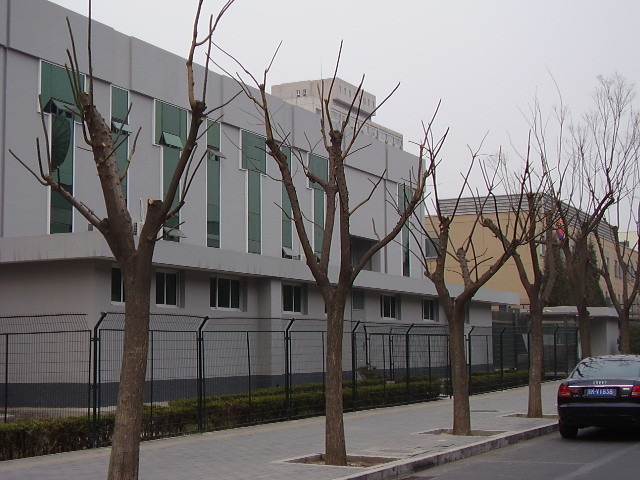
Embassy of Armenia

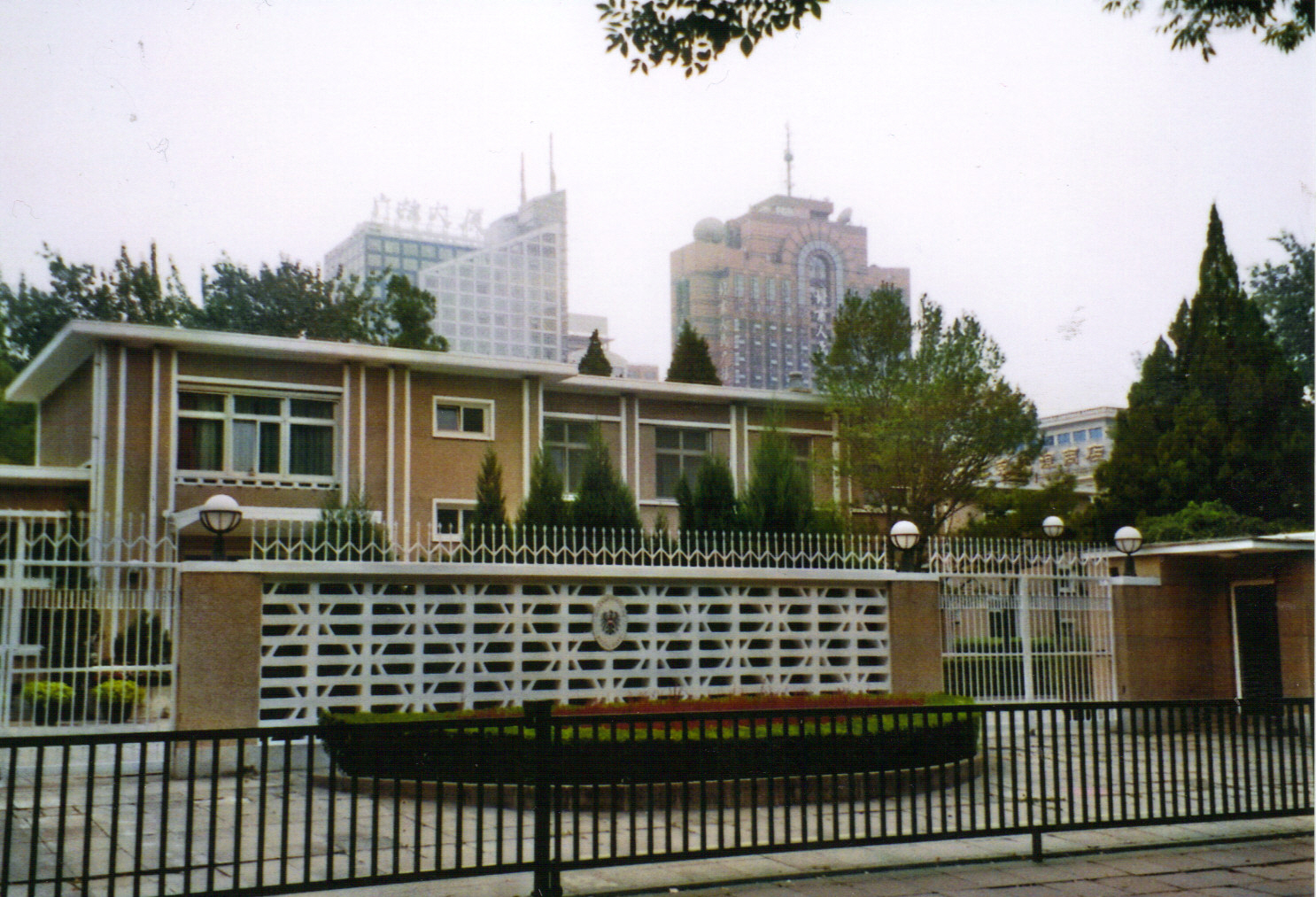
Embassy of Austria

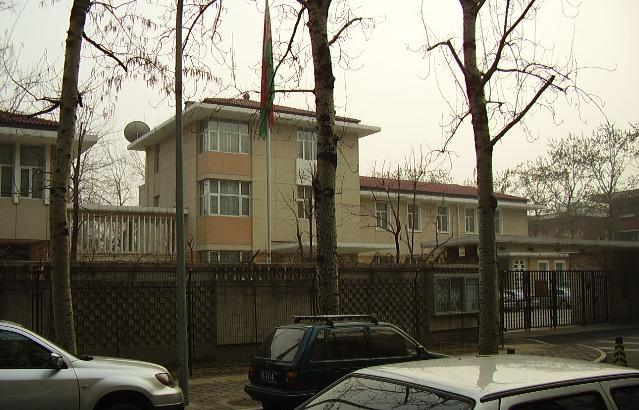
Embassy of Belarus

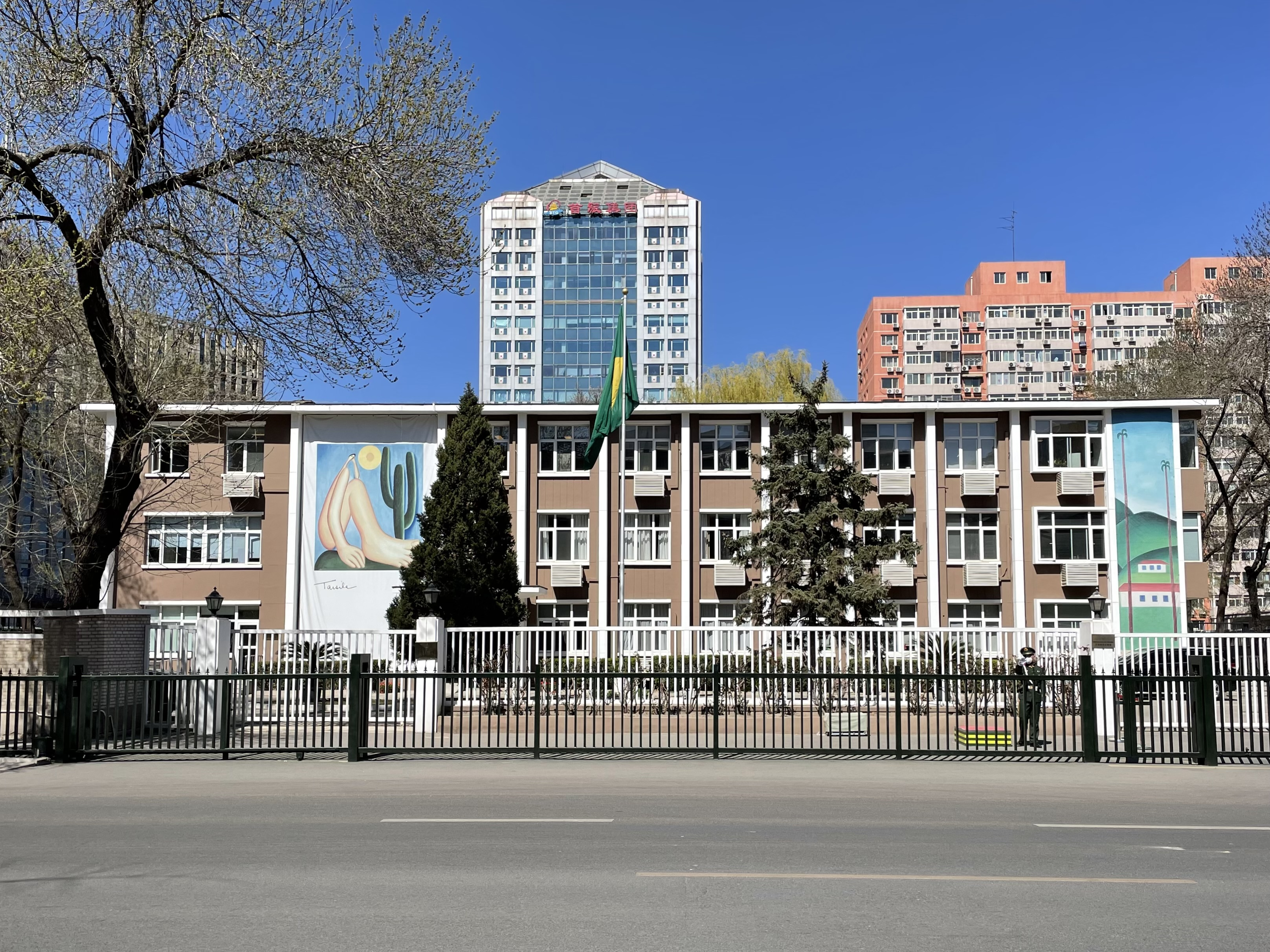
Embassy of Brazil

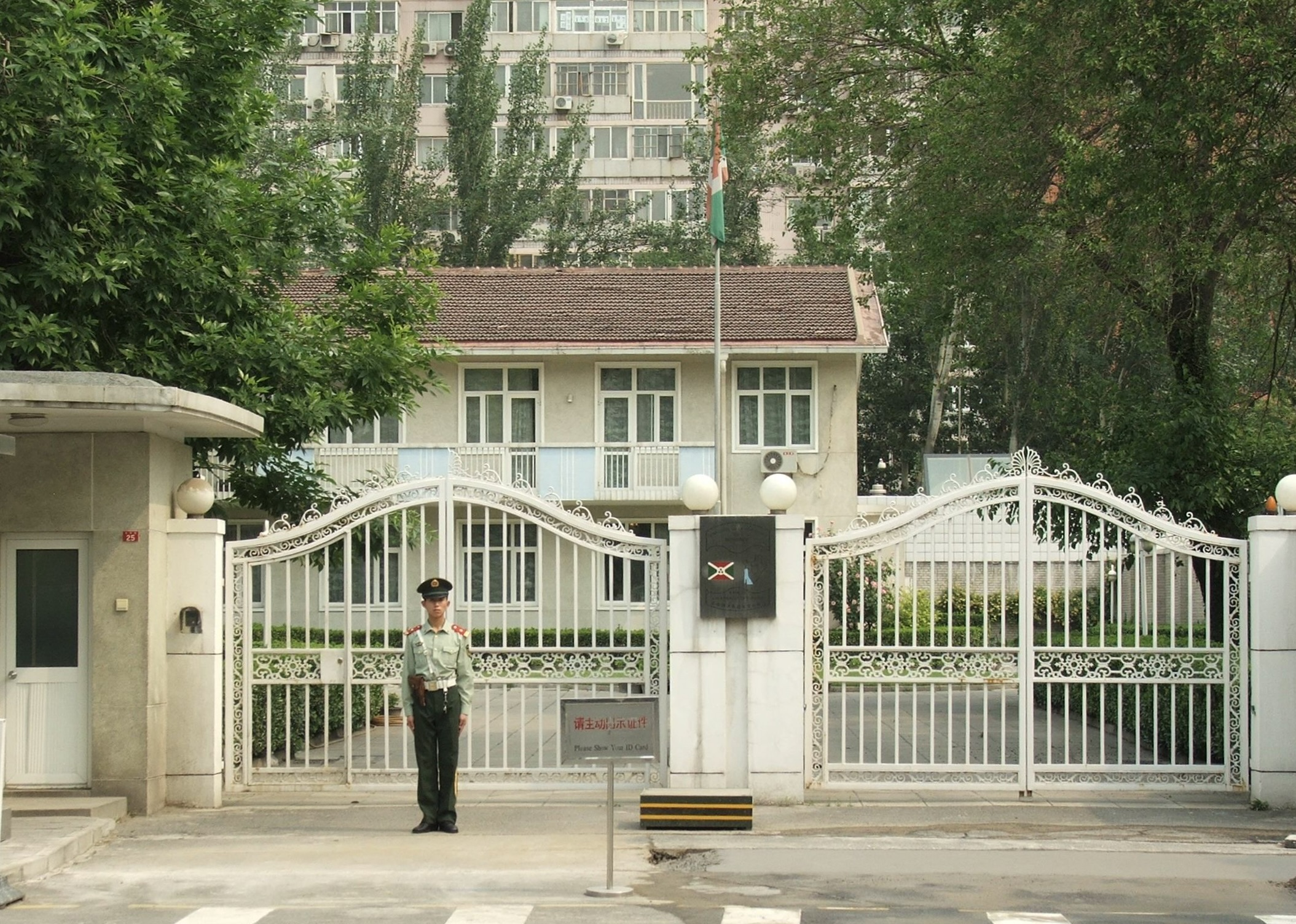
Embassy of Burundi

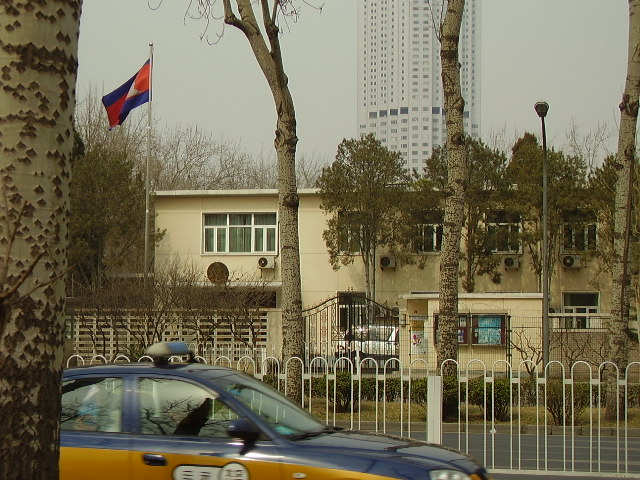
Embassy of Cambodia

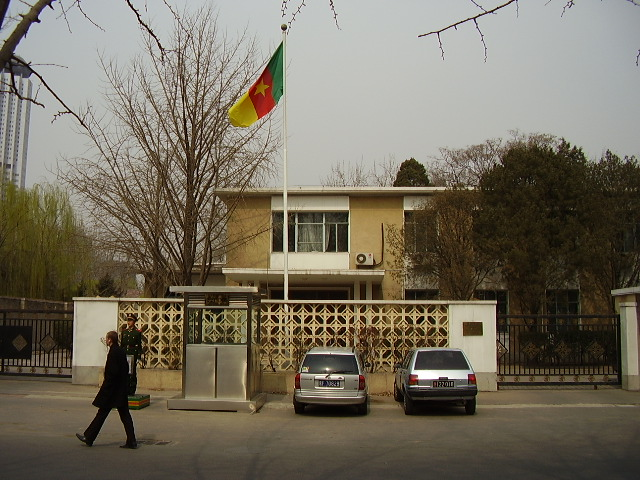
Embassy of Cameroon

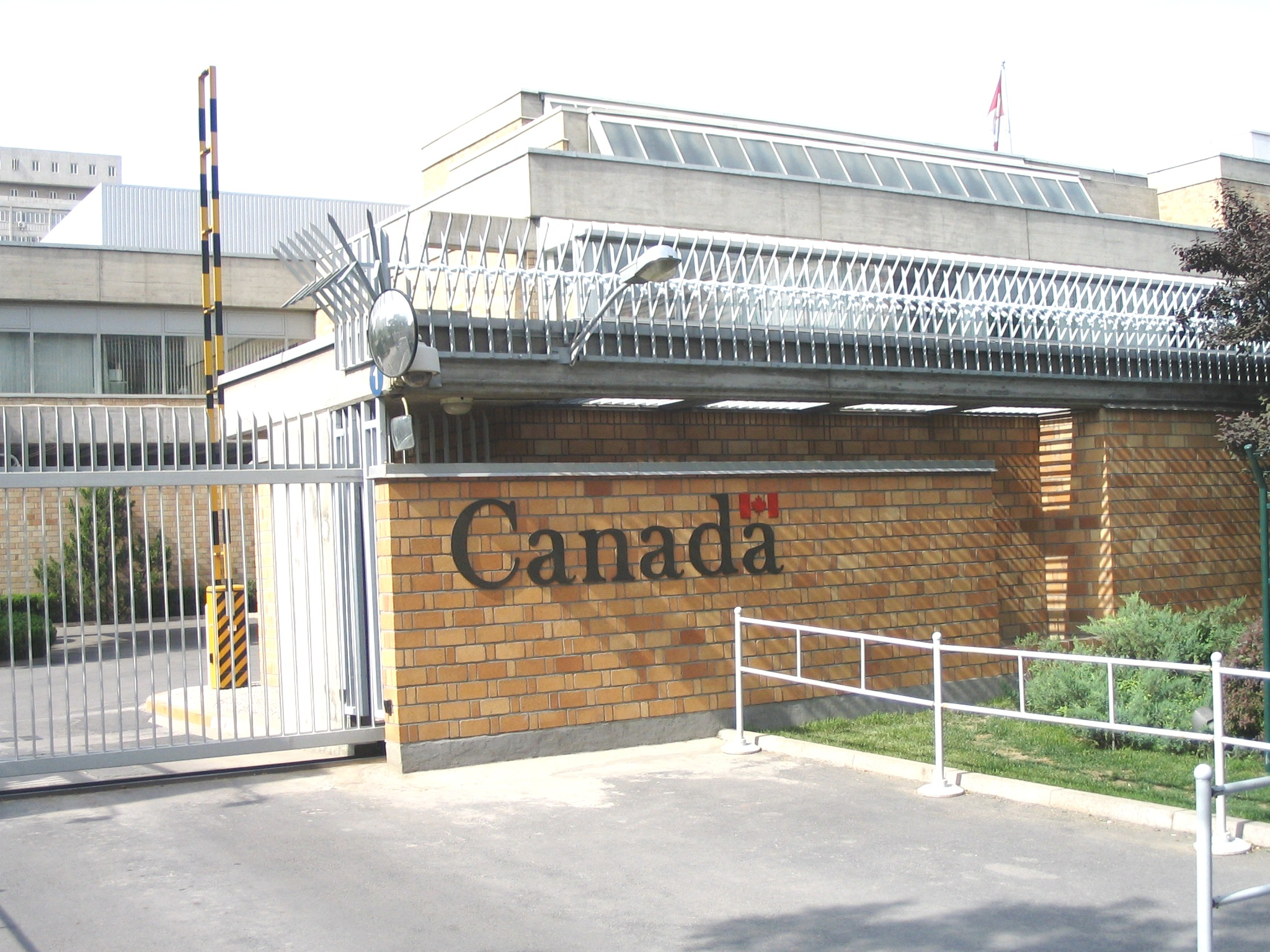
Embassy of Canada

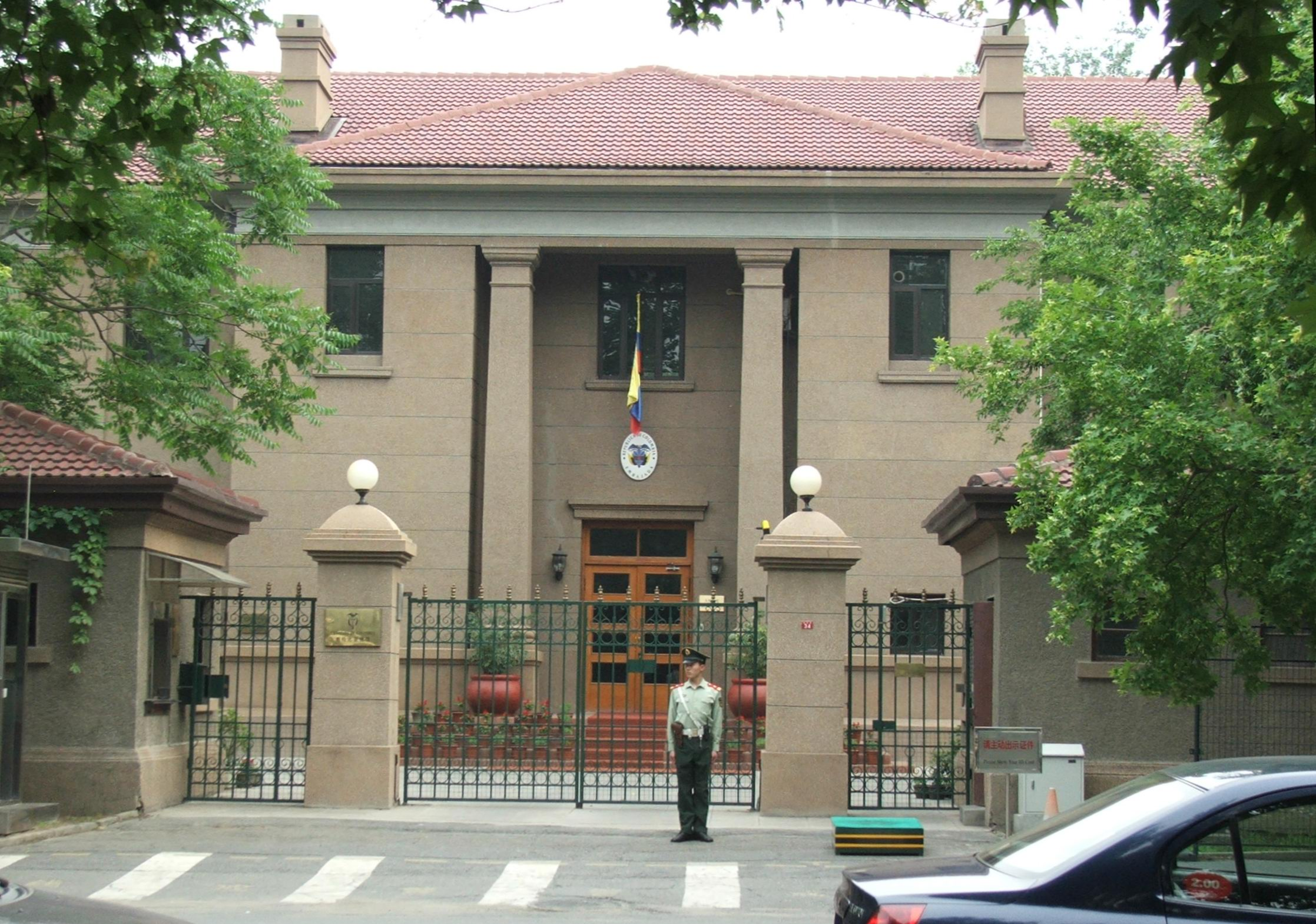
Embassy of Colombia

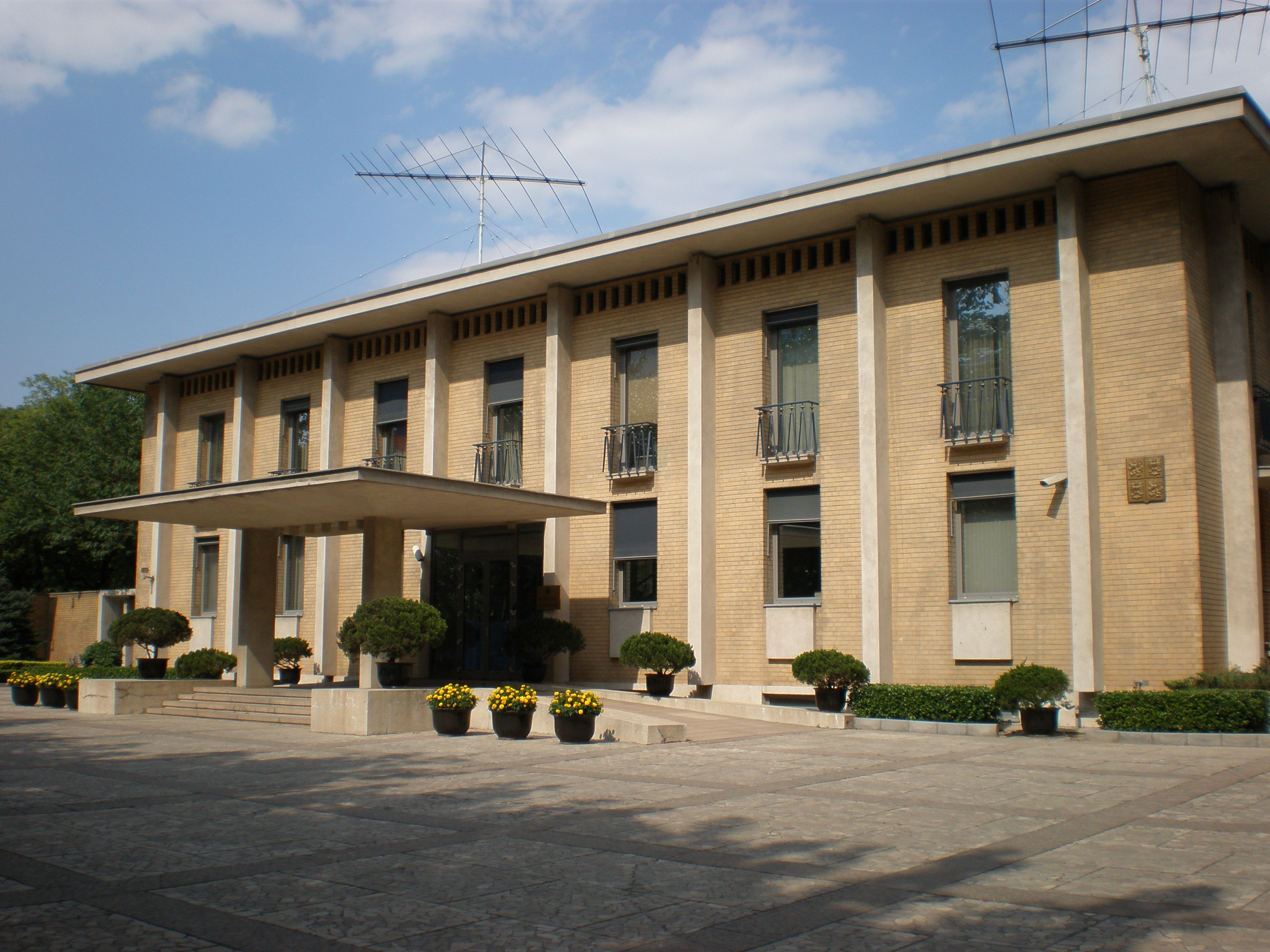
Embassy of the Czech Republic

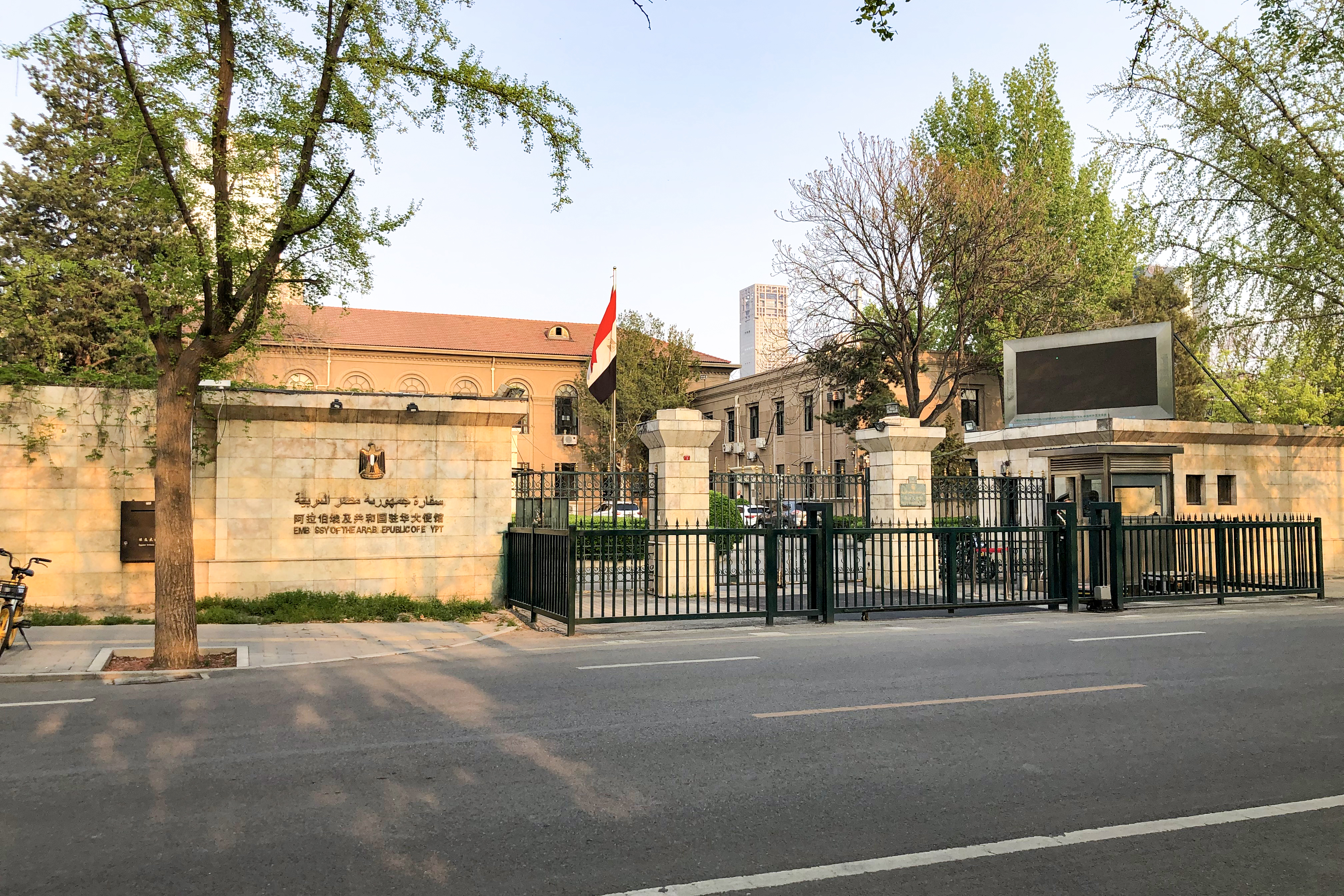
Embassy of Egypt

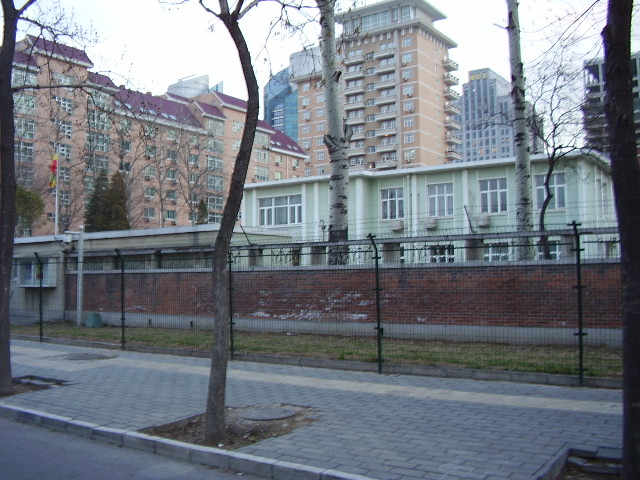
Embassy of Ethiopia

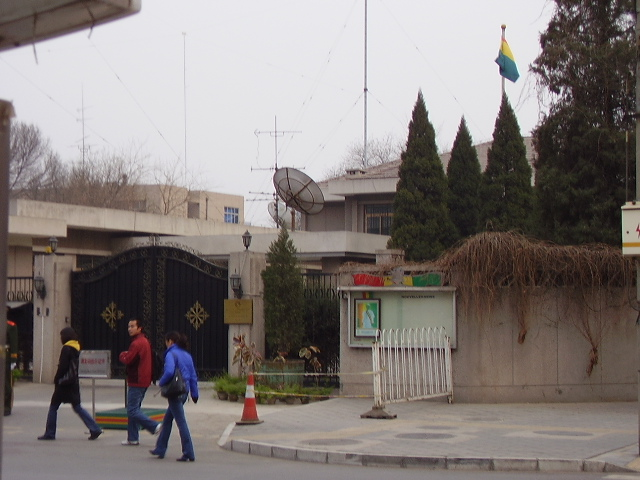
Embassy of Gabon

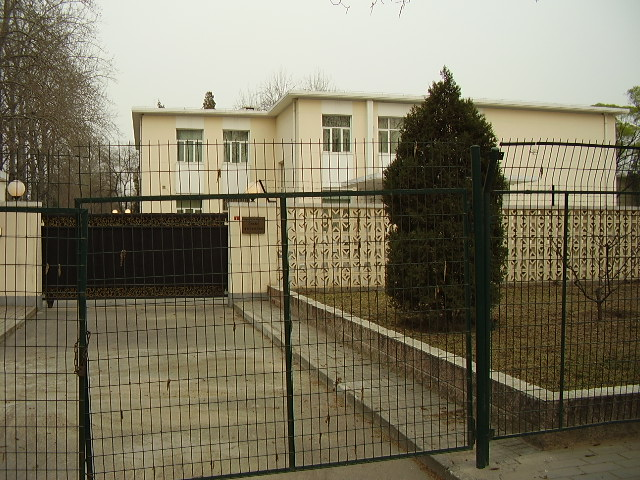
Embassy of Ghana

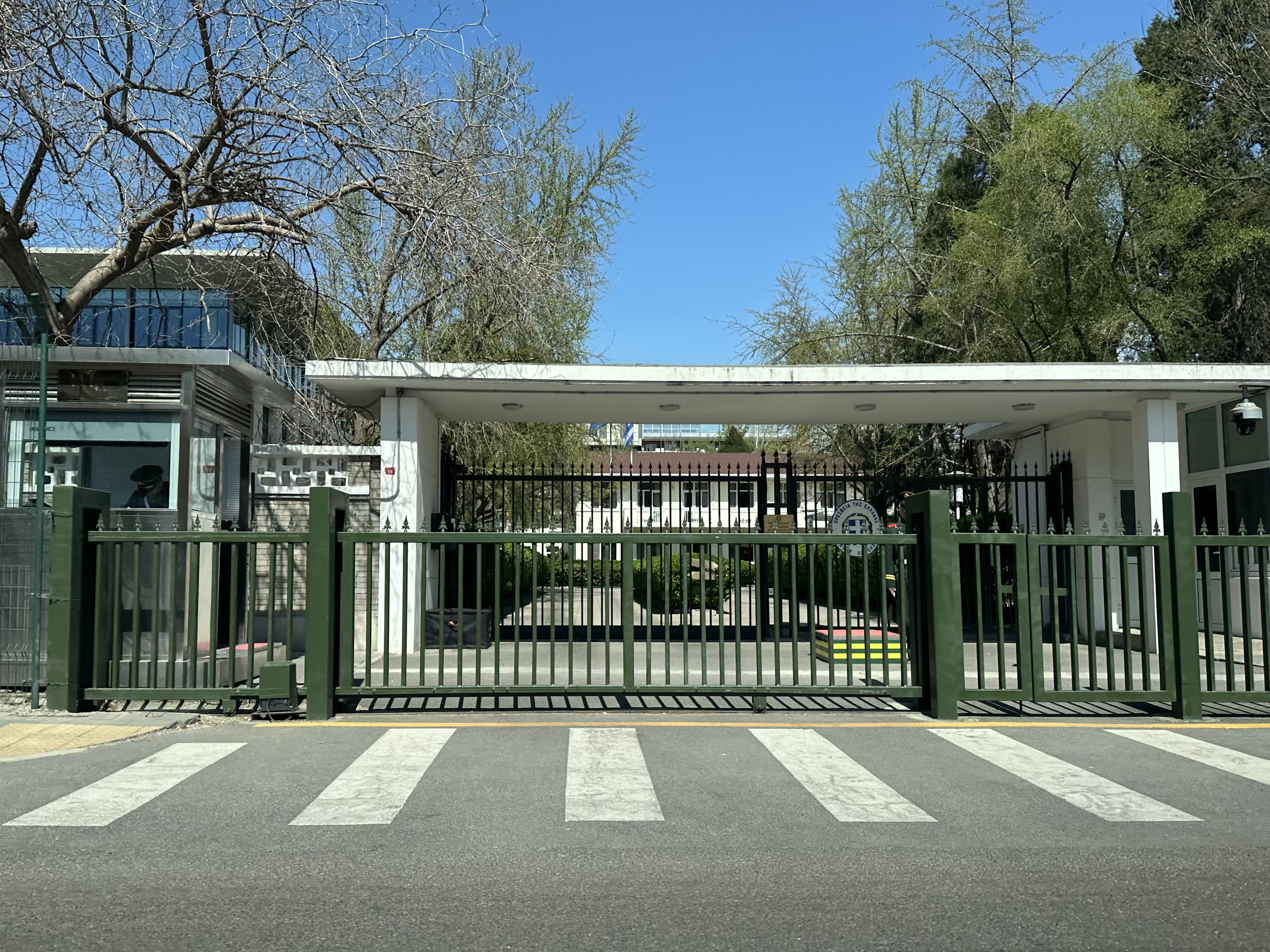
Embassy of Greece

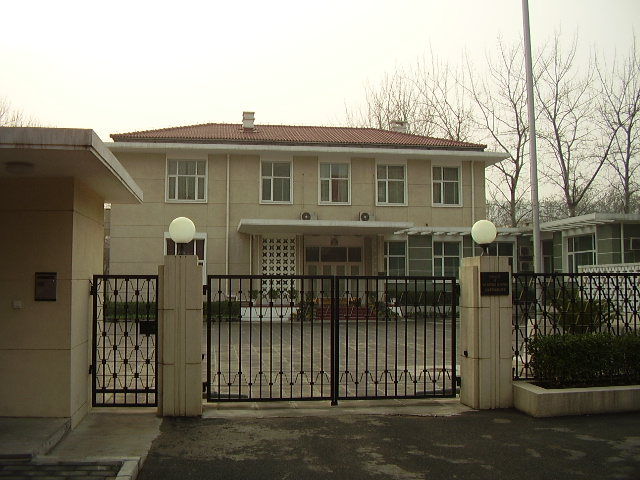
Embassy of Guyana

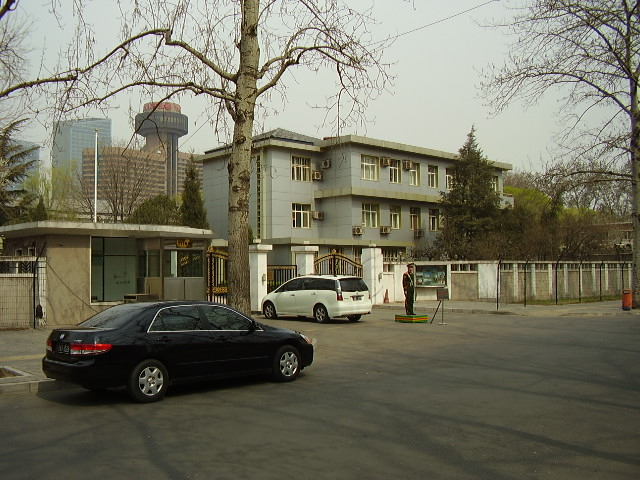
Embassy of Hungary

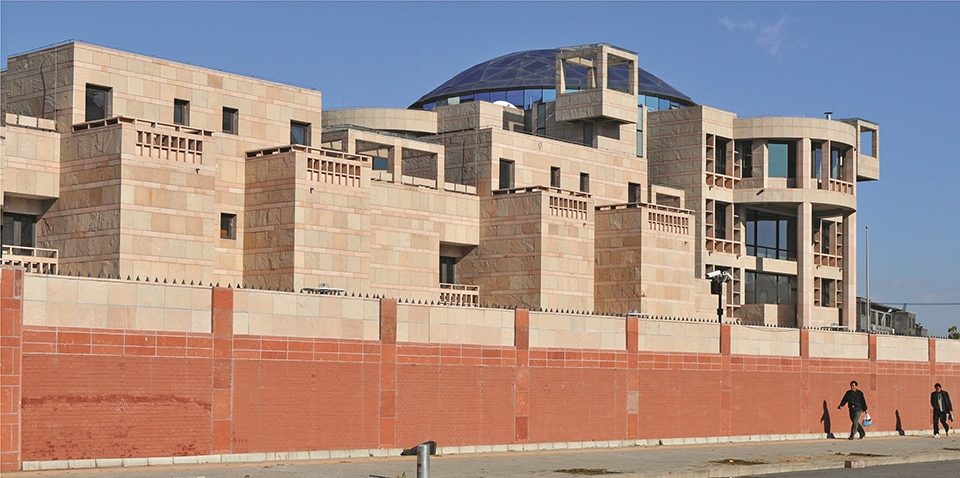
Embassy of India

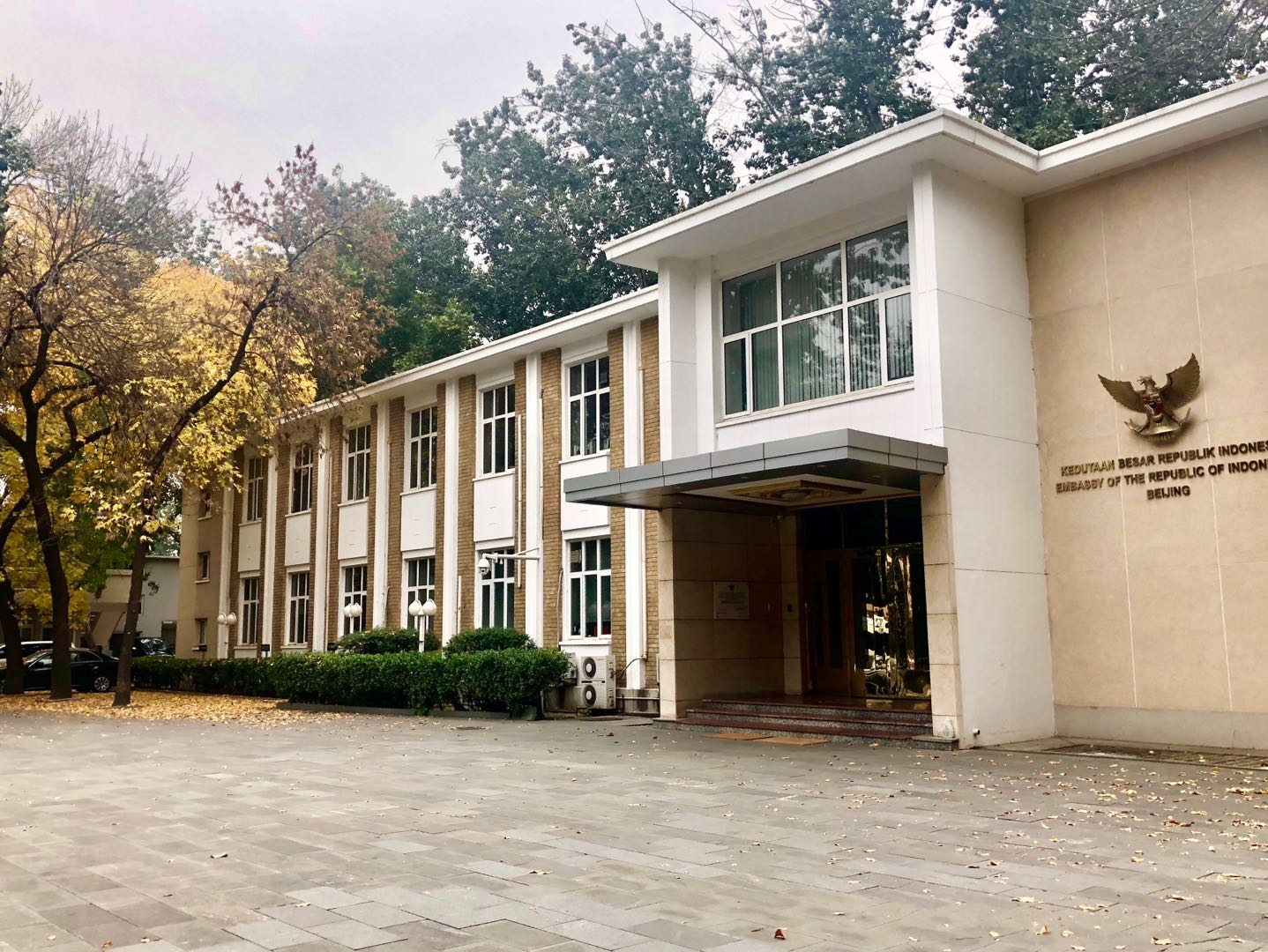
Embassy of Indonesia

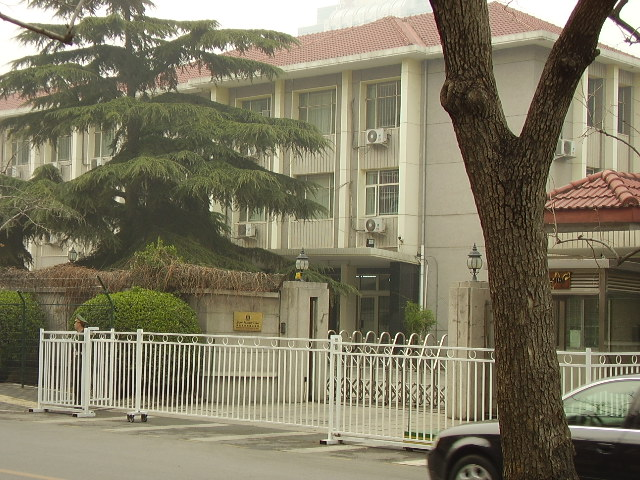
Embassy of Iraq

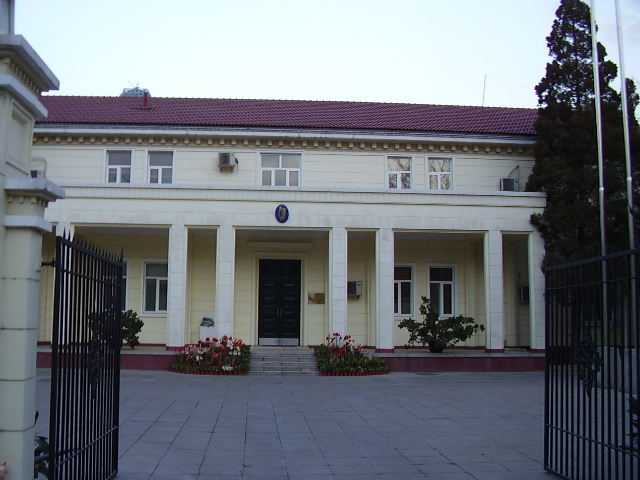
Embassy of Ireland

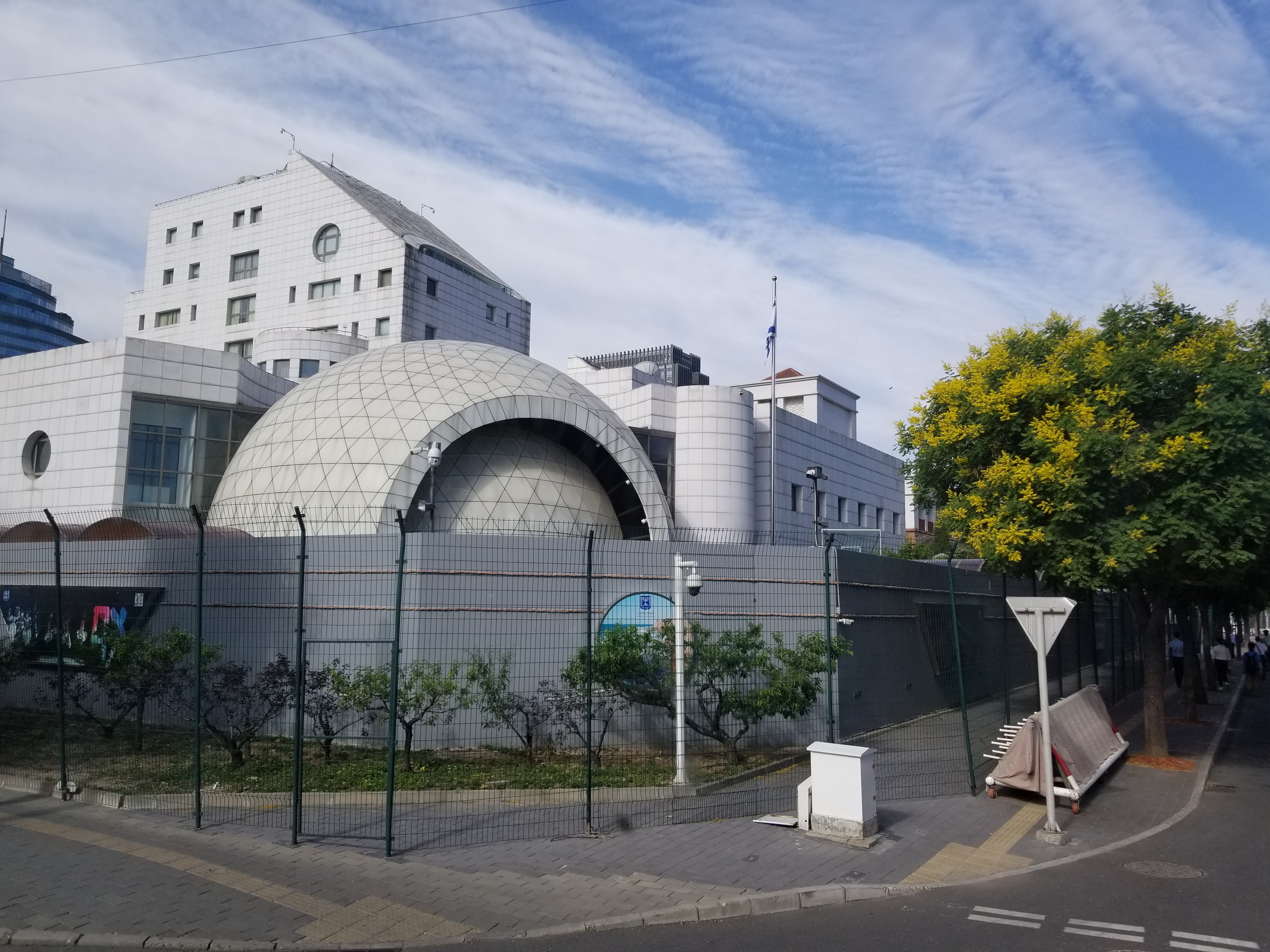
Embassy of Israel

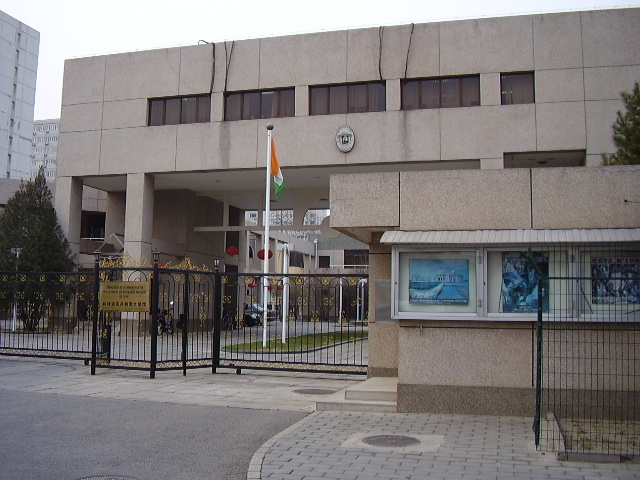
Embassy of Ivory Coast

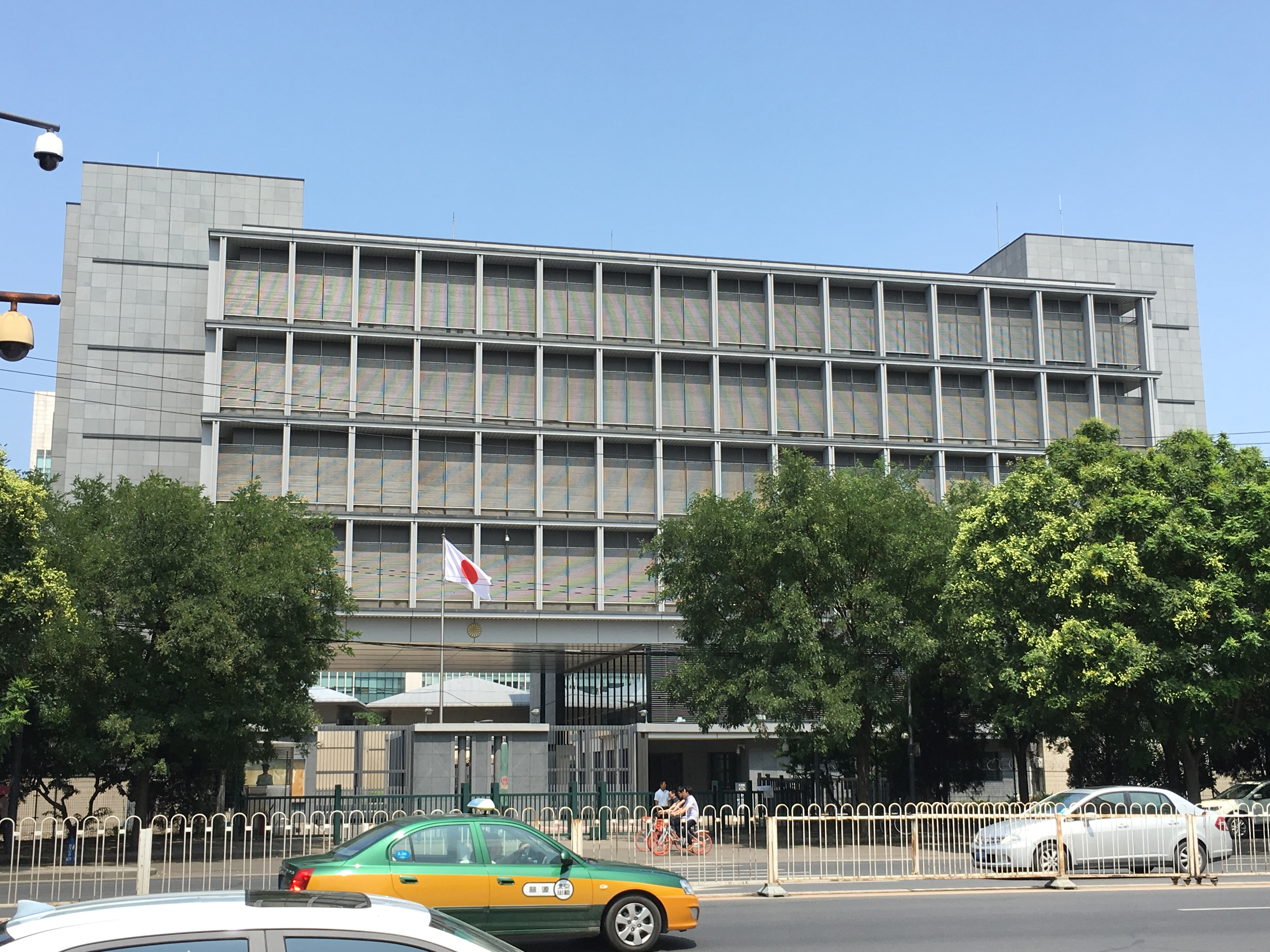
Embassy of Japan

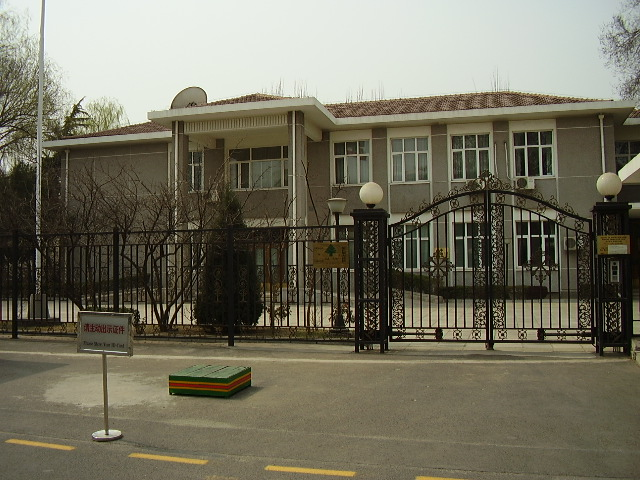
Embassy of Lebanon

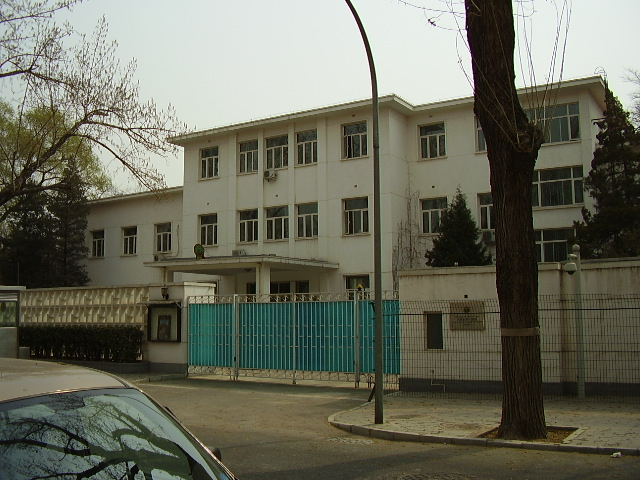
Embassy of Mali

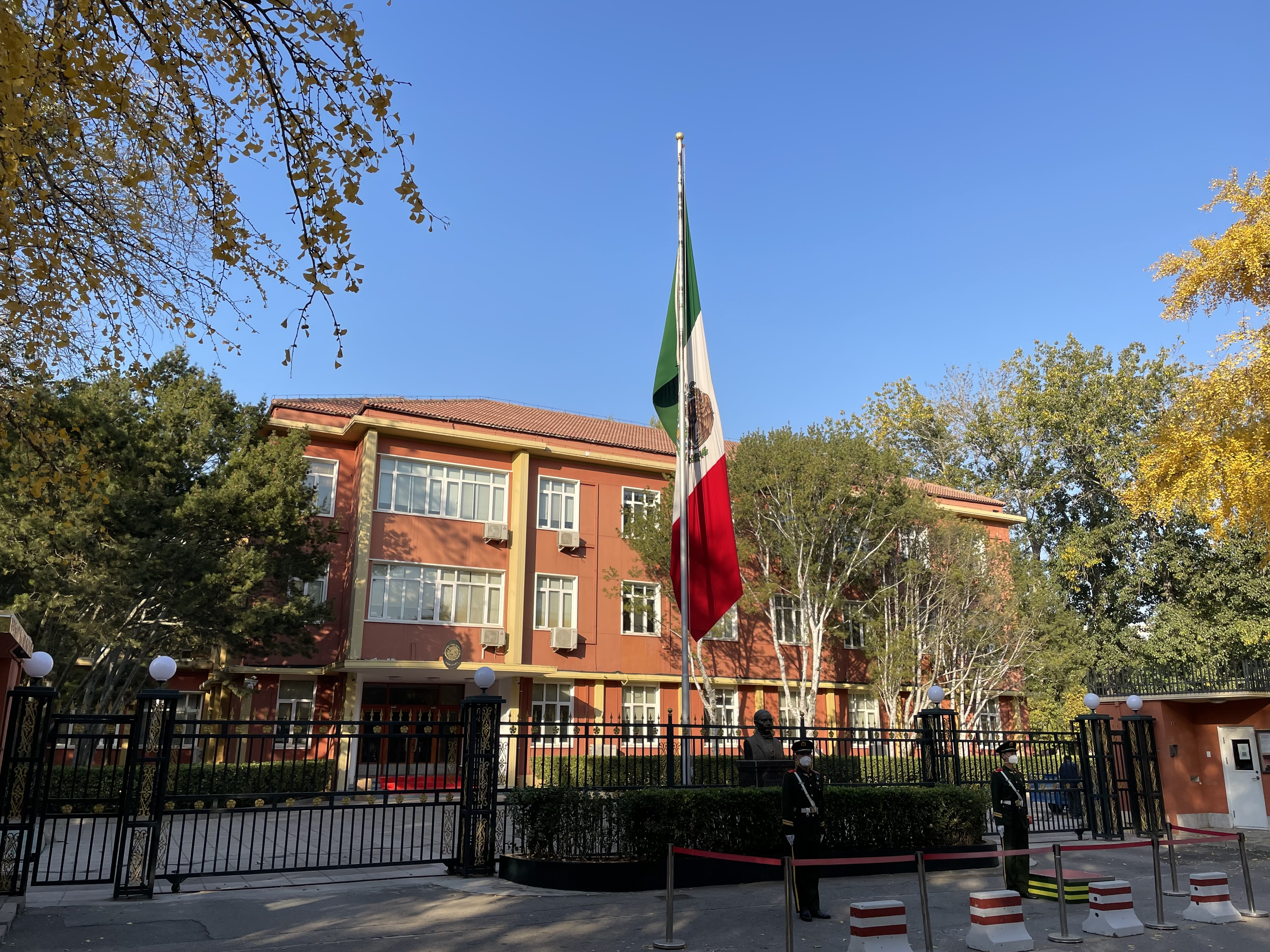
Embassy of Mexico

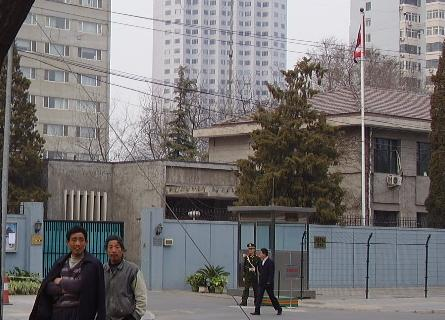
Embassy of Nepal

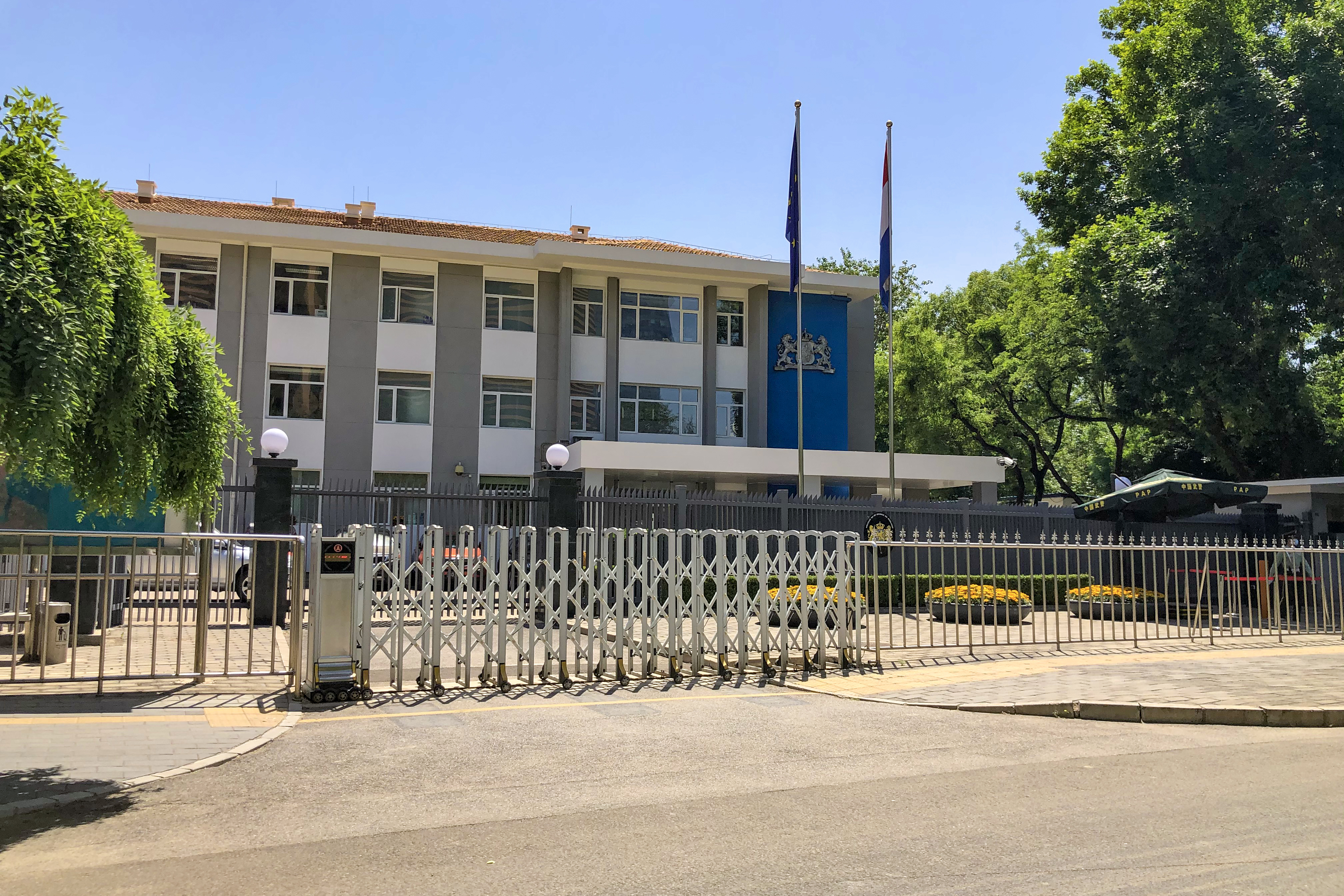
Embassy of the Netherlands

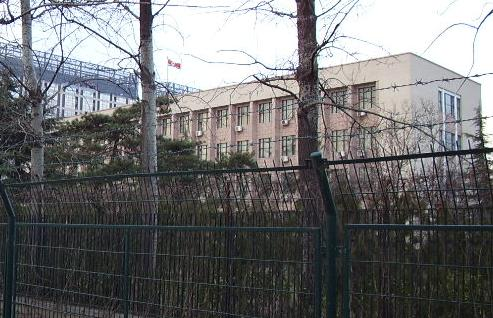
Embassy of North Korea

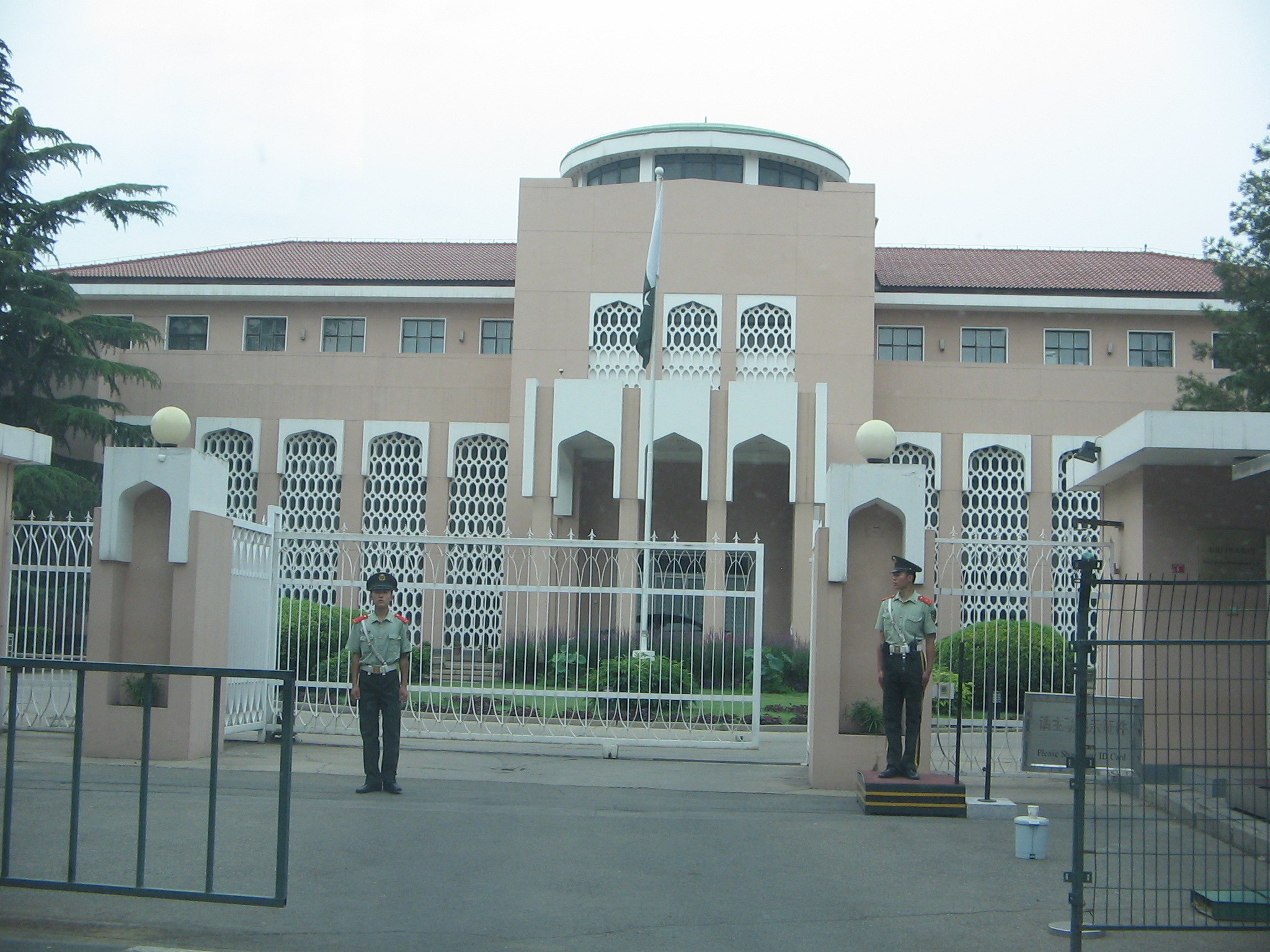
Embassy of Pakistan

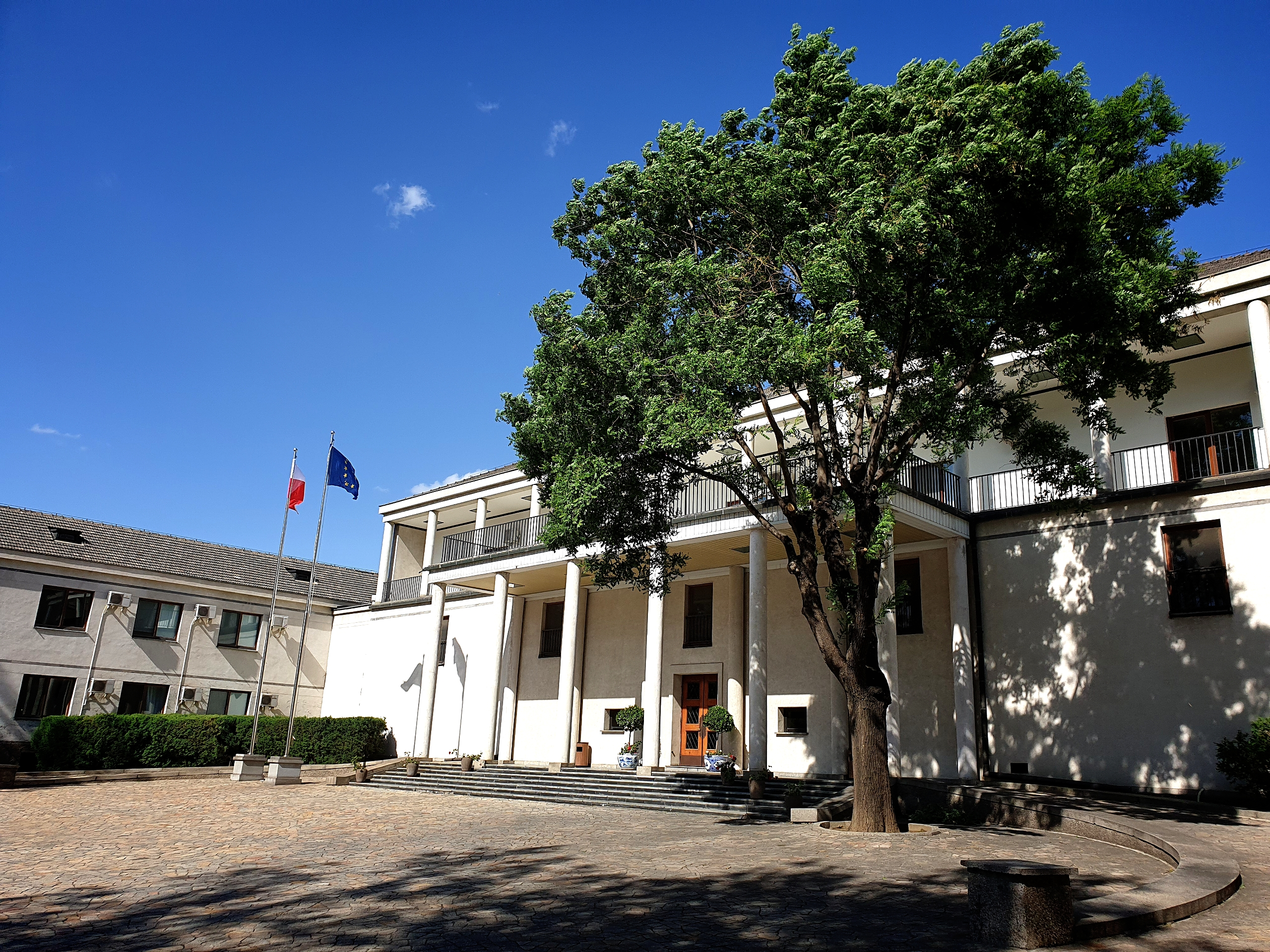
Embassy of Poland

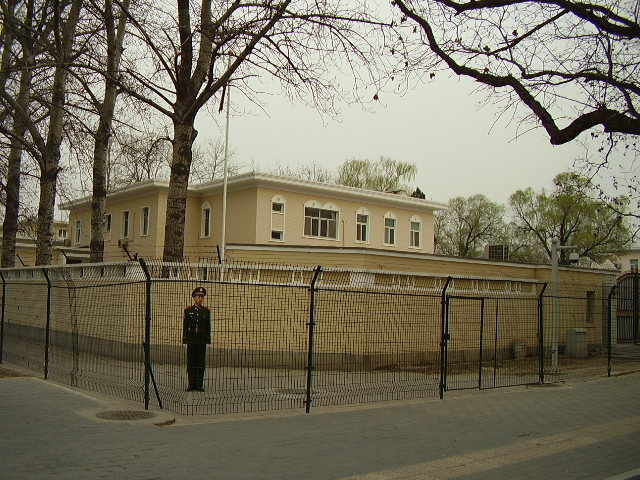
Embassy of Qatar

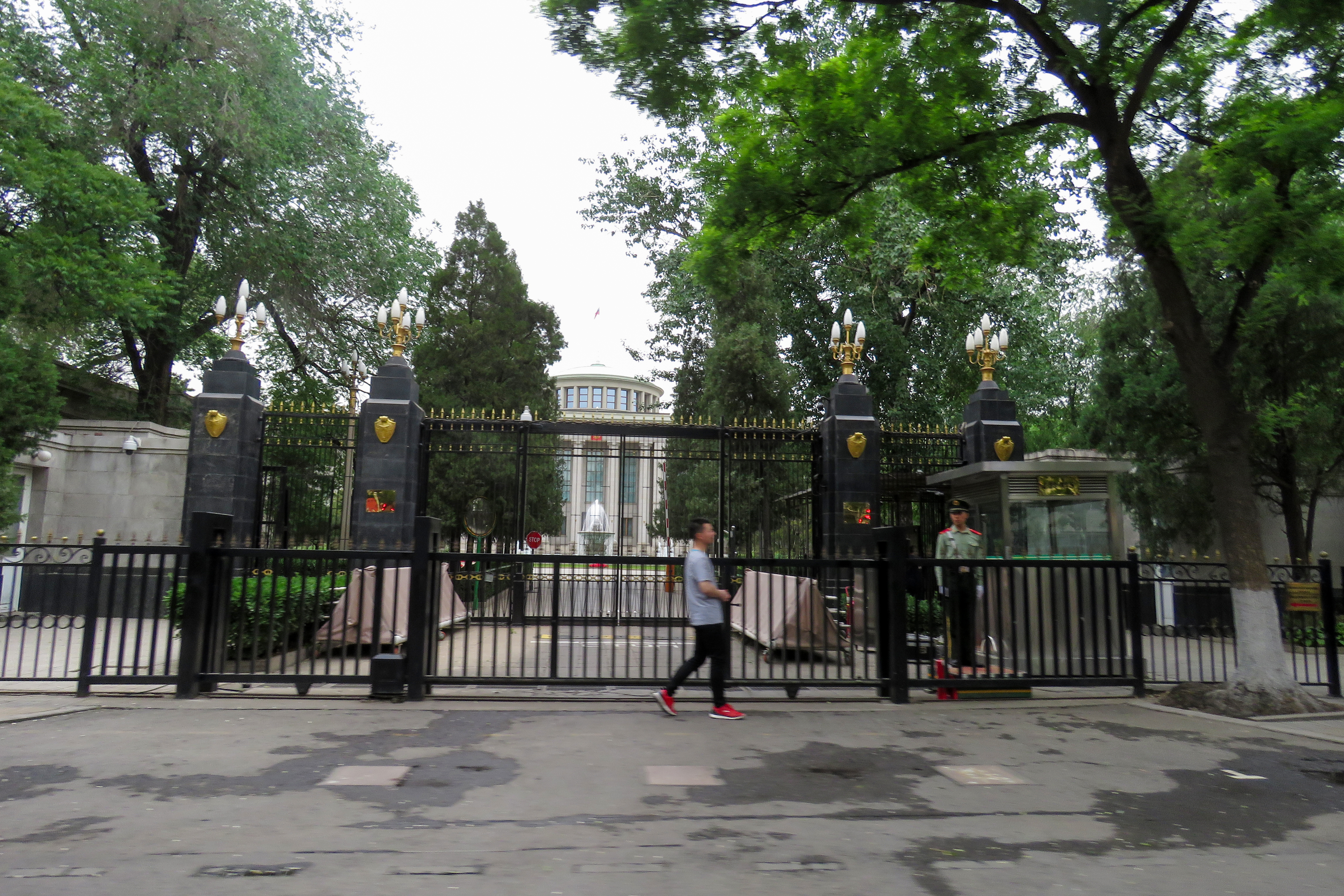
Embassy of Russia

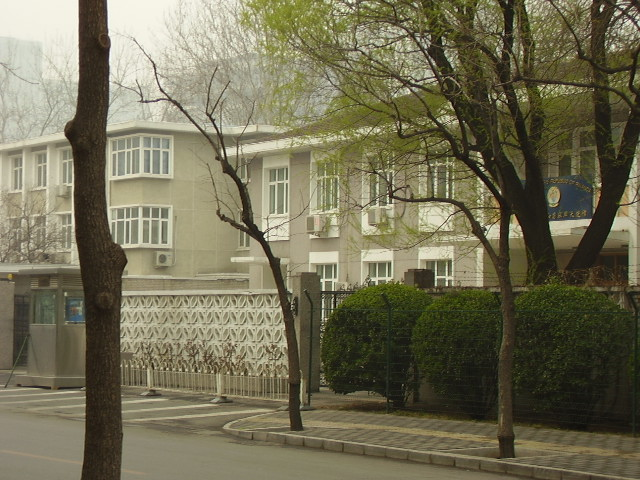
Embassy of Rwanda

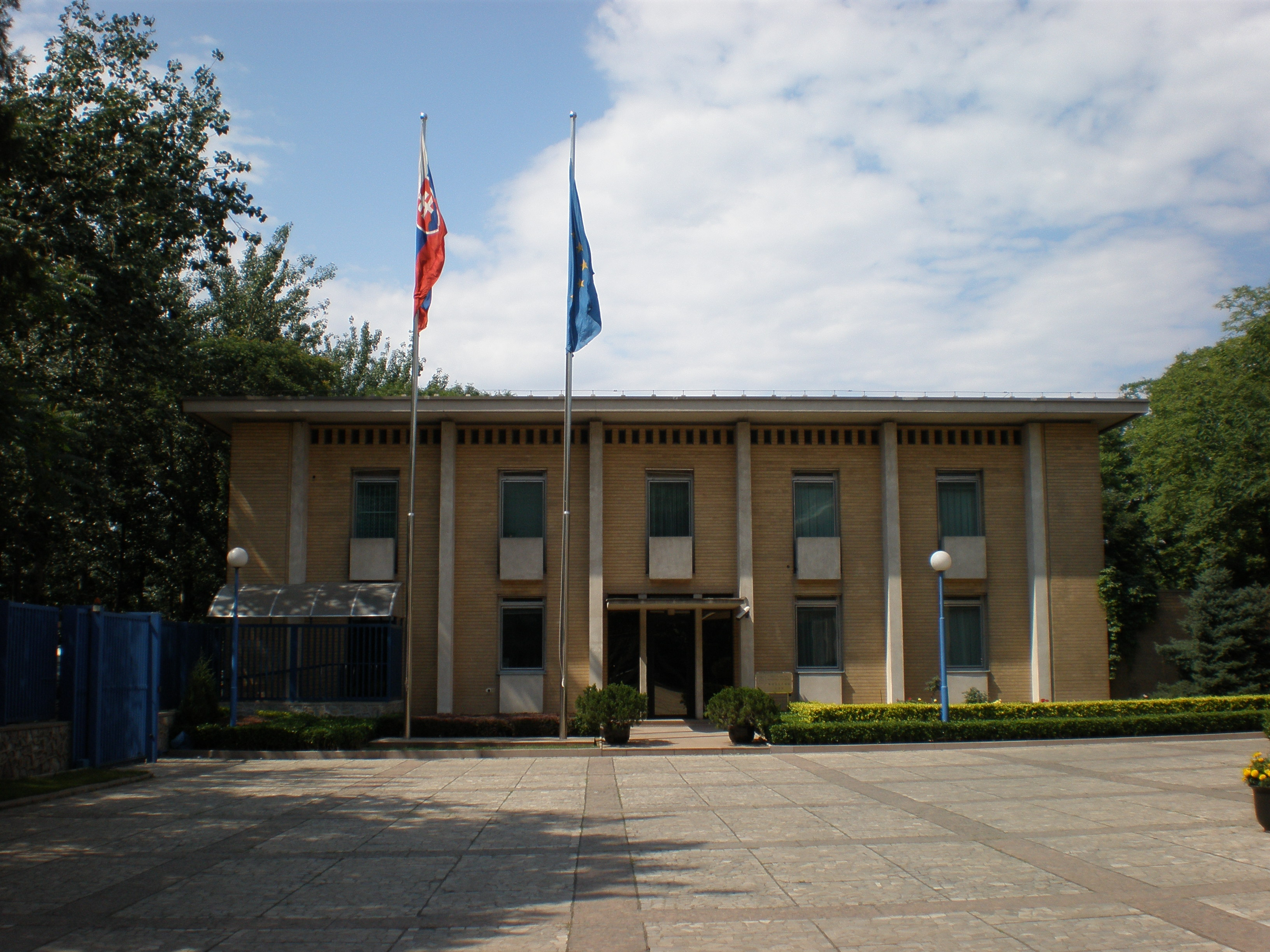
Embassy of Slovakia

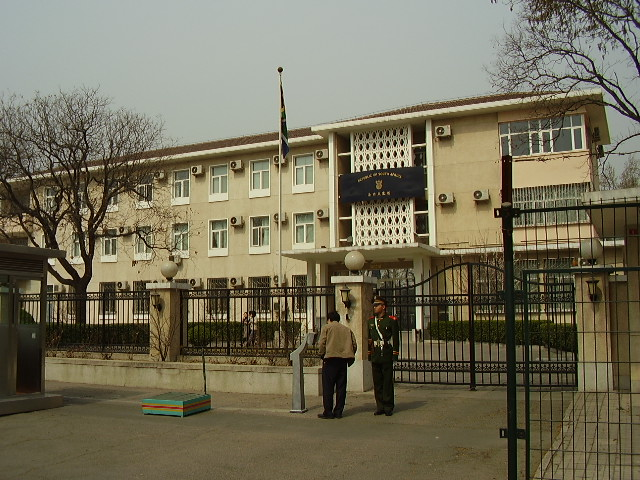
Embassy of South Africa

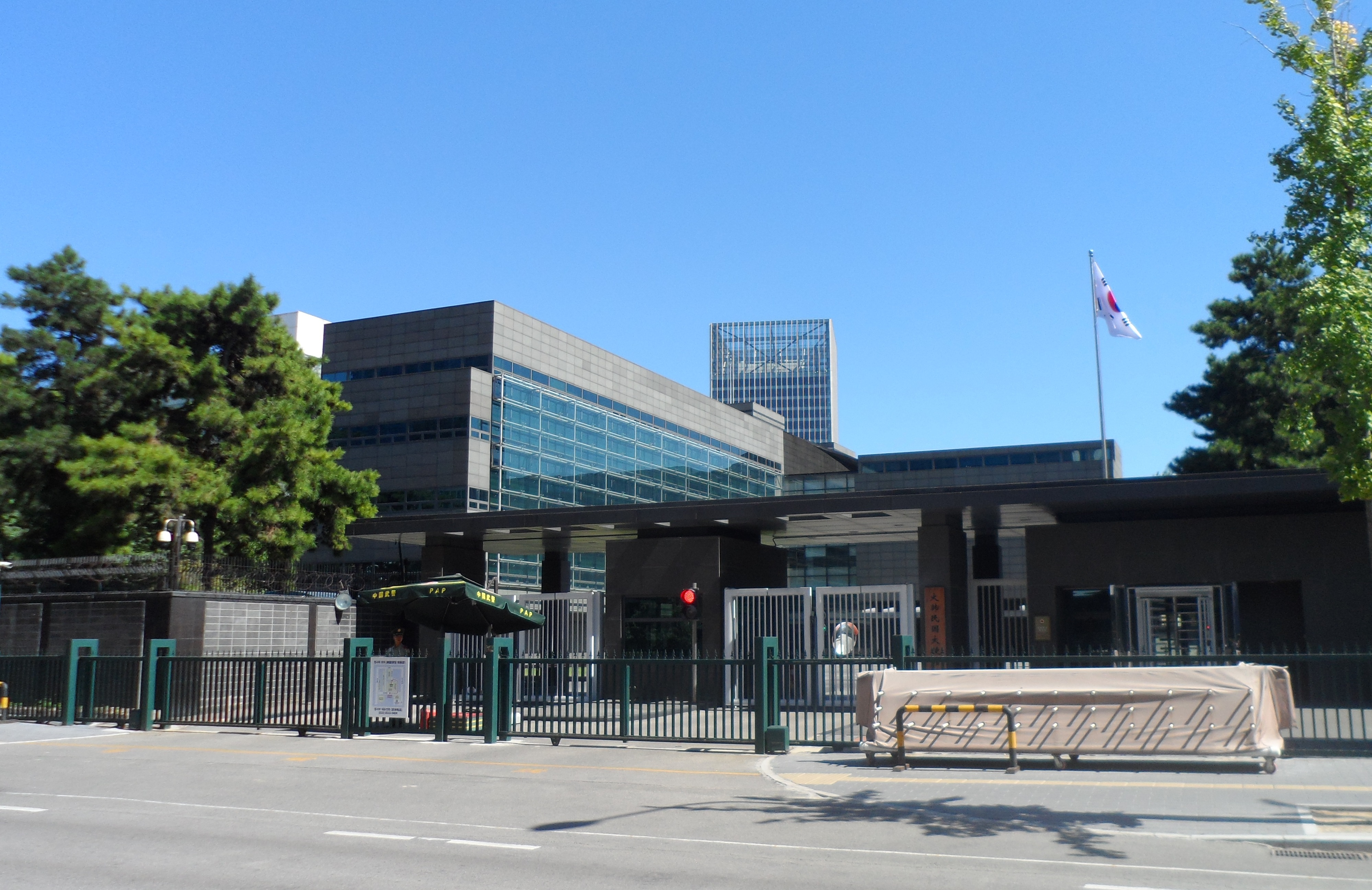
Embassy of South Korea

Embassy of Togo

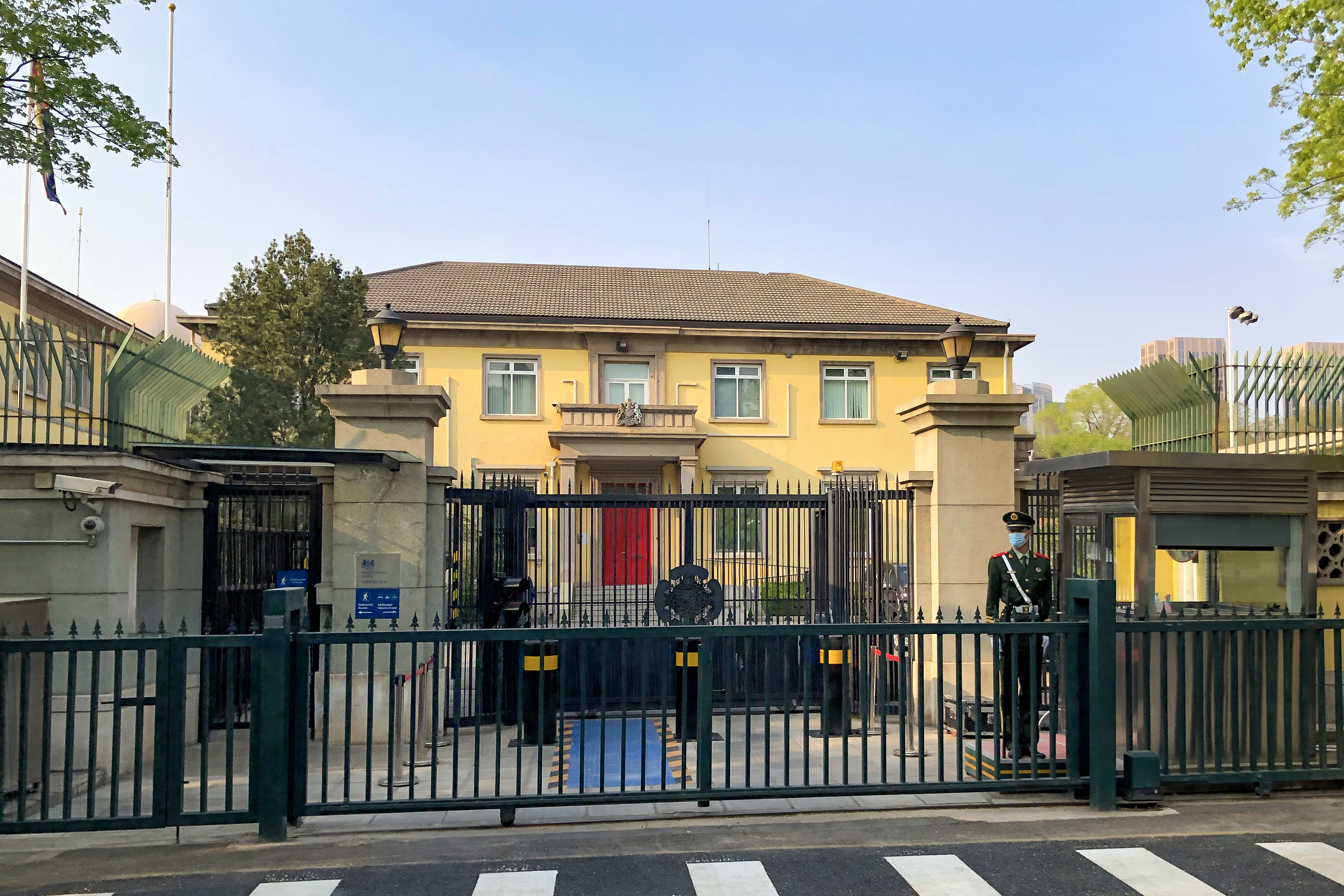
Embassy of the United Kingdom

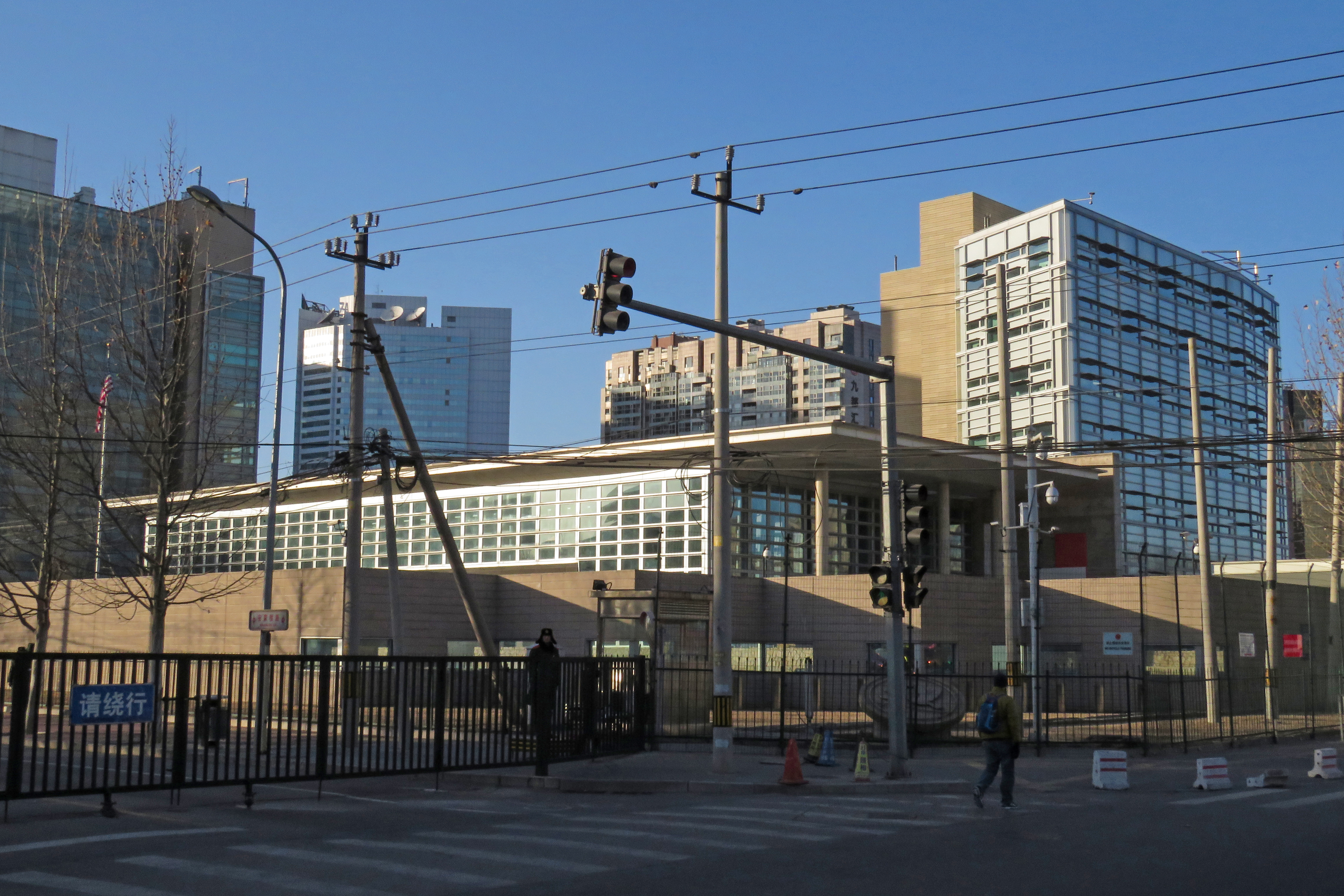
Embassy of the United States

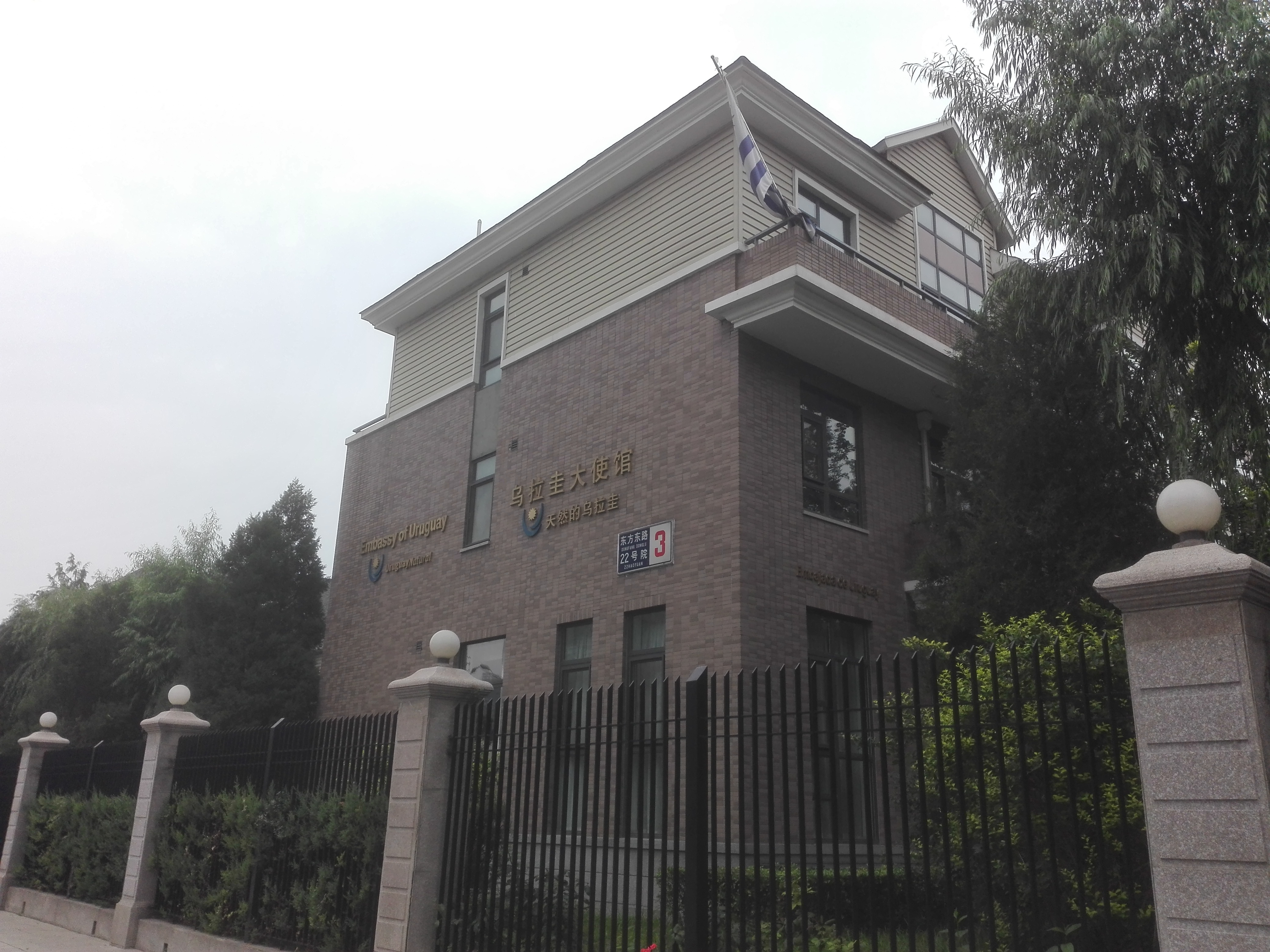
Embassy of Uruguay

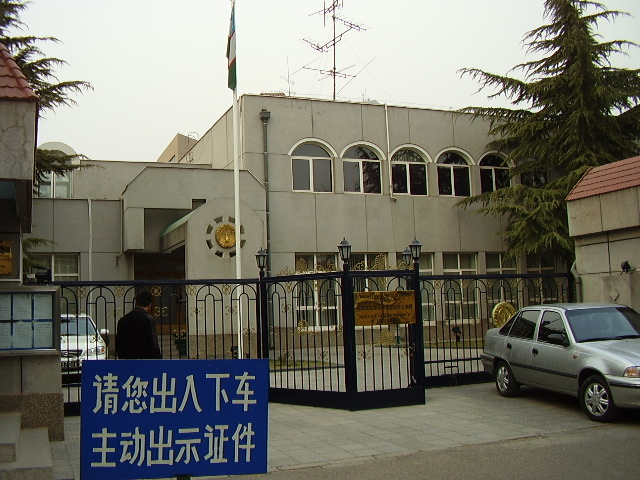
Embassy of Uzbekistan

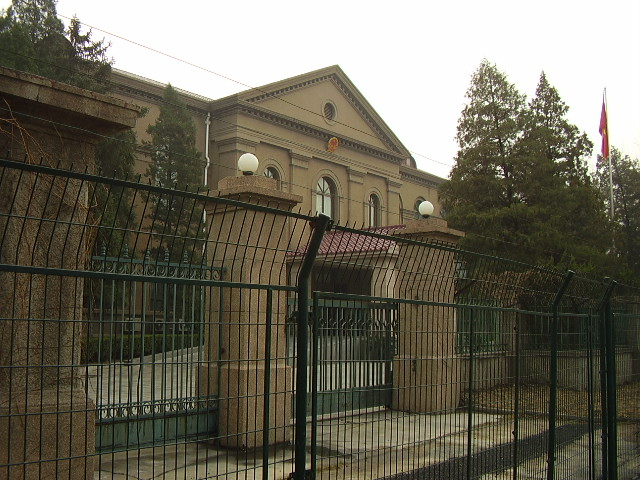
Embassy of Vietnam

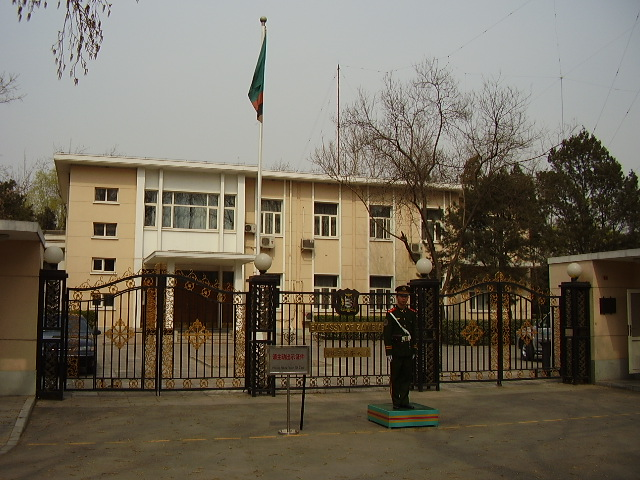
Embassy of Zambia

== Consular missions ==
The following cities are host to career consular missions. All entries listed are consulates-general, unless otherwise indicated.

=== Changsha, Hunan ===
1. Laos
2. Malawi

=== Chengdu, Sichuan ===
1. Australia
2. Austria
3. Brazil
4. Chile
5. France
6. Germany
7. Nepal
8. Pakistan
9. Singapore
10. South Korea
11. Spain
12. Thailand
13. Turkey

=== Chongqing ===
1. Belarus
2. Cambodia
3. Canada
4. Hungary
5. Italy
6. Japan
7. Mexico
8. Myanmar
9. Philippines
10. United Kingdom
11. Uruguay
12. Vietnam

=== Dalian, Liaoning ===
1. Japan (Consular office) (Note: Subordinate to the Japanese consulate-general in Shenyang.)
2. South Korea (Consular office) (Note: Subordinate to the South Korean consulate-general in Shenyang.)

=== Dandong, Liaoning ===
1. North Korea (Consular office) (Note: Subordinate to the North Korean consulate-general in Shenyang.)

=== Erenhot, Inner Mongolia ===
1. Mongolia (Consulate)

=== Guangzhou, Guangdong ===
1. Angola
2. Argentina
3. Australia
4. Austria
5. Belarus
6. Belgium
7. Brazil
8. Cambodia
9. Canada
10. Chile
11. Colombia
12. Congo-Brazzaville
13. Cuba
14. Denmark
15. Ecuador
16. France
17. Germany
18. Ghana
19. Greece
20. Hungary
21. India
22. Indonesia
23. Iran
24. Iraq
25. Israel
26. Italy
27. Ivory Coast
28. Japan
29. Kazakhstan
30. Kenya
31. Kyrgyzstan
32. Kuwait
33. Laos
34. Malaysia
35. Mali
36. Mexico
37. Nepal
38. Netherlands
39. New Zealand
40. Nigeria
41. Pakistan
42. Panama
43. Peru
44. Philippines
45. Poland
46. Portugal
47. Qatar
48. Russia
49. Saudi Arabia
50. Senegal
51. Singapore
52. South Korea
53. Spain
54. Sri Lanka
55. Sudan
56. Switzerland
57. Tanzania
58. Thailand
59. Turkey
60. Uganda
61. Ukraine
62. United Arab Emirates
63. United Kingdom
64. United States
65. Uruguay
66. Uzbekistan
67. Vanuatu
68. Venezuela
69. Vietnam
70. Zambia

=== Haikou, Hainan ===
1. Cambodia

=== Harbin, Heilongjiang ===
1. Russia

=== Hohhot, Inner Mongolia ===
1. Mongolia

=== Hong Kong ===
1. Argentina
2. Australia
3. Austria
4. Bangladesh
5. Belarus
6. Belgium
7. Brazil
8. Brunei
9. Cambodia
10. Canada
11. Chile
12. Colombia
13. Czechia
14. Dominican Republic
15. Egypt
16. Finland
17. France
18. Germany
19. Hungary
20. India
21. Indonesia
22. Iran
23. Ireland
24. Israel
25. Italy
26. Japan
27. Kazakhstan
28. Kuwait
29. Laos
30. Malaysia
31. Mexico
32. Mongolia
33. Myanmar
34. Nepal
35. Netherlands
36. New Zealand
37. Nigeria
38. Panama
39. Peru
40. Philippines
41. Poland
42. Qatar
43. Romania
44. Russia
45. Saudi Arabia
46. Singapore
47. South Africa
48. South Korea
49. Spain
50. Sweden
51. Thailand
52. Turkey
53. United Arab Emirates
54. United Kingdom
55. United States
56. Uruguay
57. Vanuatu
58. Venezuela
59. Vietnam
60. Zimbabwe

=== Jinan, Shandong ===
1. Cambodia

=== Jinghong, Yunnan ===
1. Laos (Consular office) (Note: Subordinate to the Laotian consulate-general in Kunming.)

=== Kunming, Yunnan ===
1. Bangladesh
2. Cambodia
3. Laos
4. Malaysia
5. Myanmar
6. Thailand
7. Vietnam

=== Lhasa, Tibet ===
1. Nepal

=== Macau ===
1. Angola
2. Mozambique
3. Philippines
4. Portugal

=== Manzhouli, Inner Mongolia ===
1. Mongolia (Consulate)

=== Nanning, Guangxi ===
1. Cambodia
2. Laos
3. Malaysia
4. Myanmar
5. Thailand
6. Vietnam

=== Qingdao, Shandong ===
1. Japan
2. South Korea
3. Thailand

=== Shanghai ===
1. Argentina
2. Australia
3. Austria
4. Belarus
5. Belgium
6. Brazil
7. Bulgaria
8. Cambodia
9. Canada
10. Chile
11. Colombia
12. Costa Rica
13. Cuba
14. Czechia
15. Denmark
16. Dominican Republic
17. Ecuador
18. Egypt
19. Fiji
20. Finland
21. France
22. Germany
23. Greece
24. Hungary
25. India
26. Indonesia
27. Iran
28. Ireland
29. Israel
30. Italy
31. Japan
32. Kazakhstan
33. Kuwait
34. Laos
35. Luxembourg
36. Malaysia
37. Malta
38. Mexico
39. Mongolia
40. Netherlands
41. New Zealand
42. Nigeria
43. Norway
44. Pakistan
45. Panama
46. Peru
47. Philippines
48. Poland
49. Portugal
50. Qatar
51. Romania
52. Russia
53. Serbia
54. Seychelles
55. Singapore
56. Slovakia
57. Slovenia (Consulate)
58. South Africa
59. South Korea
60. Spain
61. Sri Lanka
62. Sweden
63. Switzerland
64. Thailand
65. Turkey
66. Ukraine
67. United Arab Emirates
68. United Kingdom
69. United States
70. Uruguay
71. Uzbekistan
72. Vanuatu
73. Venezuela
74. Vietnam

=== Shenyang, Liaoning ===
1. France
2. Germany
3. Japan
4. North Korea
5. Russia
6. South Korea
7. United States

=== Ürümqi, Xinjiang ===
- Kazakhstan (Passport & Visa office)
- Kyrgyzstan (Representative Office)

=== Wuhan, Hubei ===
1. France
2. South Korea
3. United Kingdom
4. United States

=== Xiamen, Fujian ===
1. Philippines
2. Singapore
3. Thailand

=== Xi'an, Shaanxi ===
1. Cambodia
2. Malaysia
3. Kazakhstan
4. South Korea
5. Thailand

== Non-resident embassies ==
- Andorra (Andorra la Vella)
- Liechtenstein (Zürich)
- Monaco (Monaco)
- Paraguay (Seoul)
- San Marino (City of San Marino)

== Countries without formal diplomatic missions to China ==
=== States with relations ===
- Lithuania

=== States which only recognize Taiwan ===
- Belize since 1989
- Eswatini
- Guatemala
- Haiti
- Holy See
- Marshall Islands since 1998
- Palau
- Paraguay
- Saint Kitts and Nevis
- Saint Lucia since 2007
- Saint Vincent and the Grenadines
- Tuvalu

=== States with no relations with the two Chinas ===
- Bhutan
- Kosovo

== Closed missions ==
Host city	Sending country	Mission	Year closed	Ref.
Beijing	Lithuania	Embassy	2021	
Beijing	Marshall Islands	Embassy	1998	
Chengdu	Czechia	Consulate-General	2022	
Chengdu	Israel	Consulate-General	2026	
Chengdu	New Zealand	Consulate-General	2020	
Chengdu	Poland	Consulate-General	2025	
Chengdu	Sri Lanka	Consulate	2016	
Chengdu	United States	Consulate-General	2020	
Chongqing	Denmark	Consulate-General	2021	
Chongqing	Ethiopia	Consulate-General	2021	
Chongqing	Netherlands	Consulate-General	2024	
Guangzhou	Bolivia	Consulate-General	1989	
Guangzhou	Ethiopia	Consulate-General	2021	
Guangzhou	Finland	Consulate-General	2012	
Guangzhou	Norway	Consulate-General	2024	
Guangzhou	Sweden	Consulate-General	2009	
Hong Kong	Angola	Consulate-General	2018	
Hong Kong	Cape Verde	Consulate-General	2000	
Hong Kong	Denmark	Consulate-General	2012	
Hong Kong	North Korea	Consulate-General	2023	
Hong Kong	Norway	Consulate-General	2003	
Hong Kong	Portugal	Consulate-General	2003	
Lhasa	India	Consulate-General	1962	
Macau	South Korea	Consulate-General	2001	
Shanghai	Estonia	Consulate-General	2016	
Shanghai	Ethiopia	Consulate-General	2021	
Shanghai	Iceland	Consulate-General	2011	
Shanghai	Marshall Islands	Consulate-General	1998	
Shanghai	North Korea	Consulate-General	1964	

== See also ==
- Foreign relations of the People's Republic of China
- List of diplomatic missions of the People's Republic of China
- Visa requirements for Chinese citizens
