= List of ambassadors of the Arab League to China =

Ambassador of Arab League to China
- League of Arab States Mission to China (阿拉伯国家联盟驻华代表处); 39.961627°N 116.469419°E
- Inaugural holder: Mohamed Abdul Wahab El Saket
- Formation: February 4, 1996

The Arab League ambassador in Beijing is the official representative of the Arab League to the government of the People's Republic of China.

== List of representatives ==
Diplomatic accreditation	Ambassador	Observations	Secretary General of the Arab League	Premier of the People's Republic of China	Term end
February 4, 1996	Mohamed Abdul Wahab El Saket	Egyptian diplomat and an Algerian scholar	Ahmed Asmat Abdel-Meguid	Li Peng	December 1, 2002
April 1, 2004	Mohammed Fouad Serry	On April 1, Secretary General Moussa appointed Mohamed Fouad Serry the new Chief of LAS Mission in Beijing.	Amr Moussa	Wen Jiabao	
March 8, 2007	Mohamed el Hassan Shabbo	Mohamed Elhassan Shabbo	Ahmed Asmat Abdel-Meguid	Wen Jiabao	
May 14, 2014	Ghanim Al Shibli	加尼姆•希卜里	Nabil Elaraby	Li Keqiang	2016

== See also ==
- Sino-Arab relations
