= List of diplomatic missions of China =

List of diplomatic missions administered by the People's Republic of China

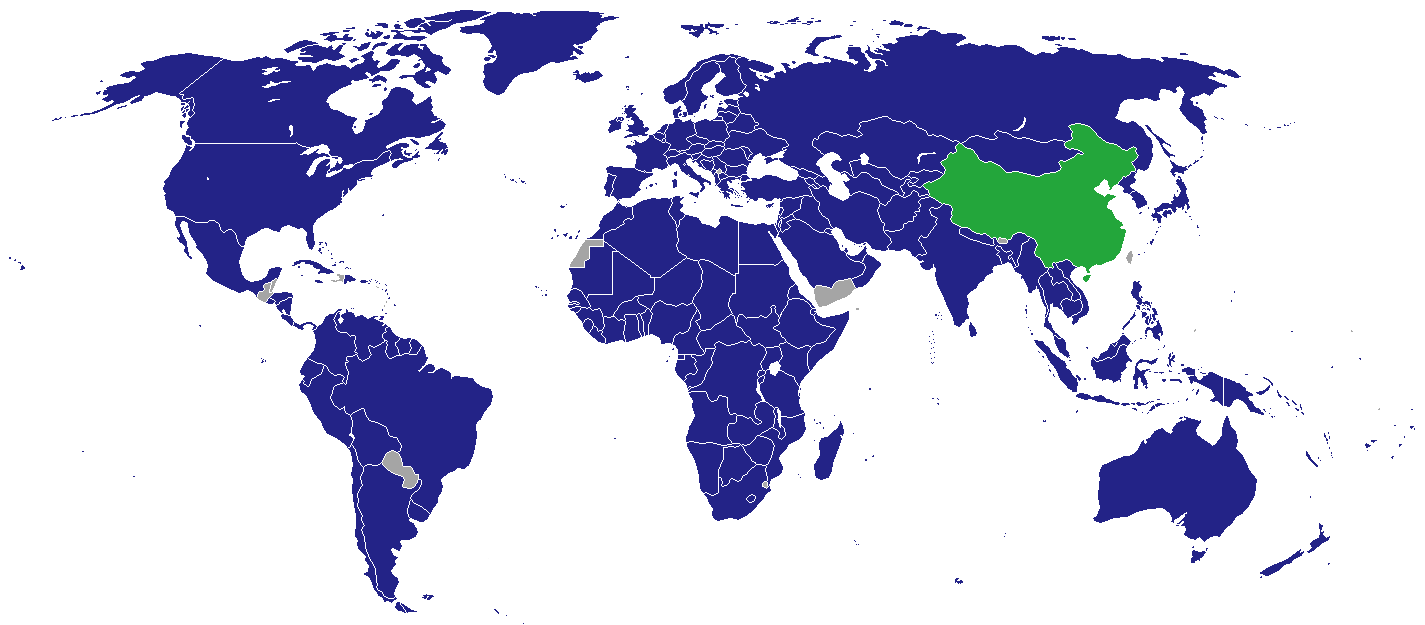
Diplomatic missions of the People's Republic of China

This is a list of diplomatic missions of the People's Republic of China (PRC). The PRC has the largest number of active diplomatic posts in the world, including 274 bilateral posts (embassies and consulates) in 176 countries as well as 8 permanent missions to international organizations and two other posts (as of November 2023).

For over fifty years, the PRC has been competing with the Republic of China (ROC) for diplomatic recognition in the international community. Until the 1970s, most countries in the world recognized the ROC over the PRC. As of 2018, a small number of states have full diplomatic relations with the ROC (see Republic of China diplomatic missions); the ROC maintains unofficial relations with most states.

Much like the US, the PRC does not have honorary consulates in other countries. In 2015, China opened its largest diplomatic mission in Pakistan.

== Current missions ==
=== Africa ===
Host country	Host city	Mission	Concurrent accreditation	Ref.
Algeria	Algiers	Embassy		
Angola	Luanda	Embassy		
Benin	Cotonou	Embassy		
Botswana	Gaborone	Embassy		
Burkina Faso	Ouagadougou	Embassy		
Burundi	Bujumbura	Embassy		
Cameroon	Yaoundé	Embassy		
Cape Verde	Praia	Embassy		
Central African Republic	Bangui	Embassy		
Chad	N'Djamena	Embassy		
Comoros	Moroni	Embassy		
Congo-Brazzaville	Brazzaville	Embassy		
Congo-Kinshasa	Kinshasa	Embassy		
Djibouti	Djibouti City	Embassy		
Egypt	Cairo	Embassy		
Egypt	Alexandria (Note: Originally established in Port Said, the consulate-general was transferred to Alexandria in 1968.)	Consulate-General		
Equatorial Guinea	Malabo	Embassy		
Eritrea	Asmara	Embassy		
Ethiopia	Addis Ababa	Embassy		
Gabon	Libreville	Embassy		
Gambia	Banjul	Embassy		
Ghana	Accra	Embassy		
Guinea	Conakry	Embassy		
Guinea Bissau	Bissau	Embassy		
Ivory Coast	Abidjan	Embassy		
Kenya	Nairobi	Embassy		
Lesotho	Maseru	Embassy		
Liberia	Monrovia	Embassy		
Libya	Tripoli	Embassy		
Madagascar	Antananarivo	Embassy		
Malawi	Lilongwe	Embassy		
Mali	Bamako	Embassy		
Mauritania	Nouakchott	Embassy		
Mauritius	Port Louis	Embassy		
Mozambique	Maputo	Embassy		
Morocco	Rabat	Embassy		
Namibia	Windhoek	Embassy		
Niger	Niamey	Embassy		
Nigeria	Abuja	Embassy		
Nigeria	Lagos	Consulate-General		
Rwanda	Kigali	Embassy		
São Tomé and Príncipe	São Tomé	Embassy		
Senegal	Dakar	Embassy		
Seychelles	Victoria	Embassy		
Sierra Leone	Freetown	Embassy		
Somalia	Mogadishu	Embassy		
South Africa	Pretoria	Embassy		
South Africa	Cape Town	Consulate-General		
South Africa	Durban	Consulate-General		
South Africa	Johannesburg	Consulate-General		
South Sudan	Juba	Embassy		
Sudan	Khartoum	Embassy		
Tanzania	Dar es Salaam	Embassy		
Tanzania	Zanzibar City	Consulate-General (Note: Originally an embassy, it was downgraded to a consulate in 1964 following the unification of Zanzibar and Tanganyika, and was later elevated to a consulate-general in 1999.)		
Togo	Lomé	Embassy		
Tunisia	Tunis	Embassy		
Uganda	Kampala	Embassy		
Zambia	Lusaka	Embassy		
Zimbabwe	Harare	Embassy		

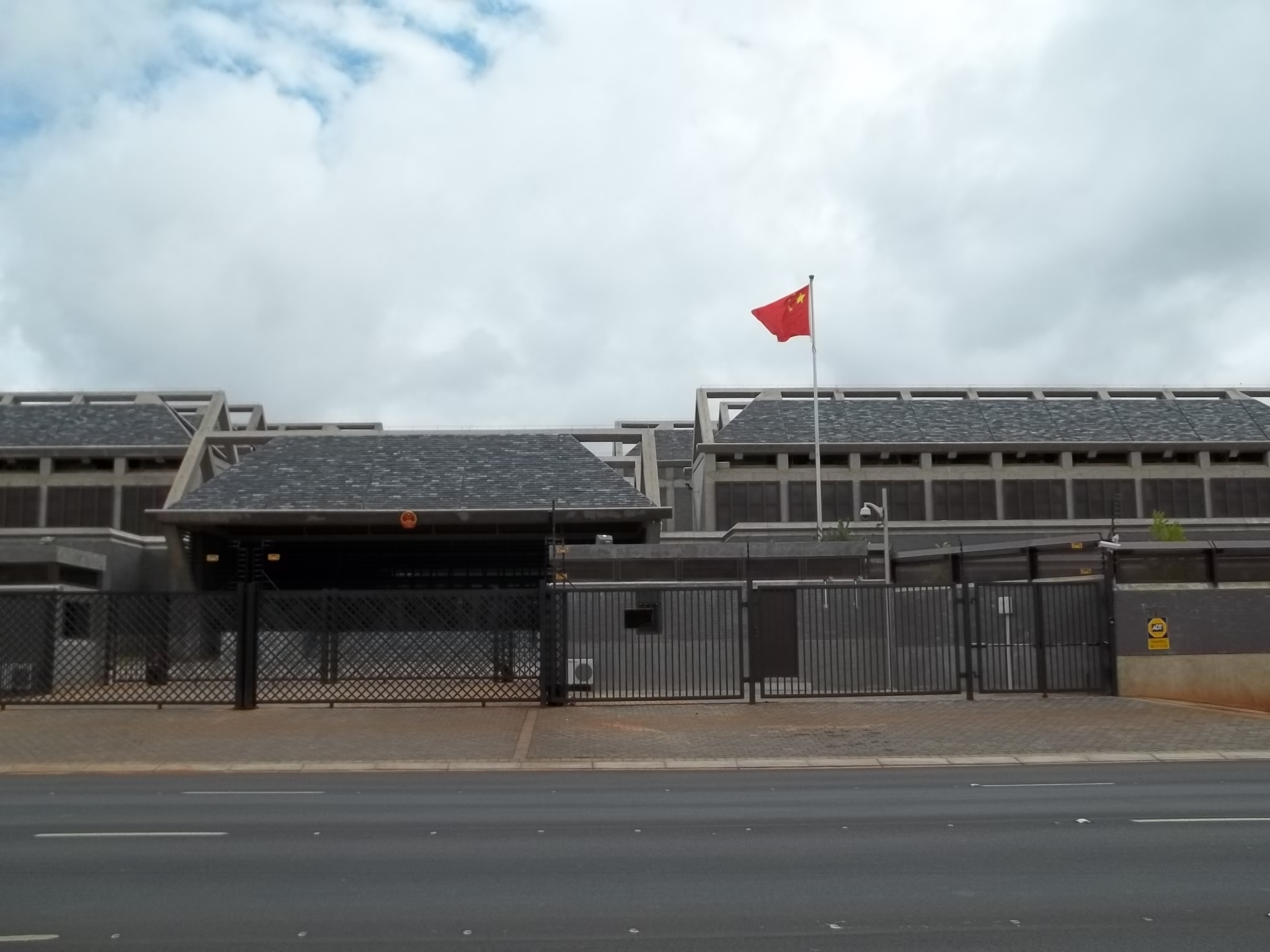
Embassy in Pretoria

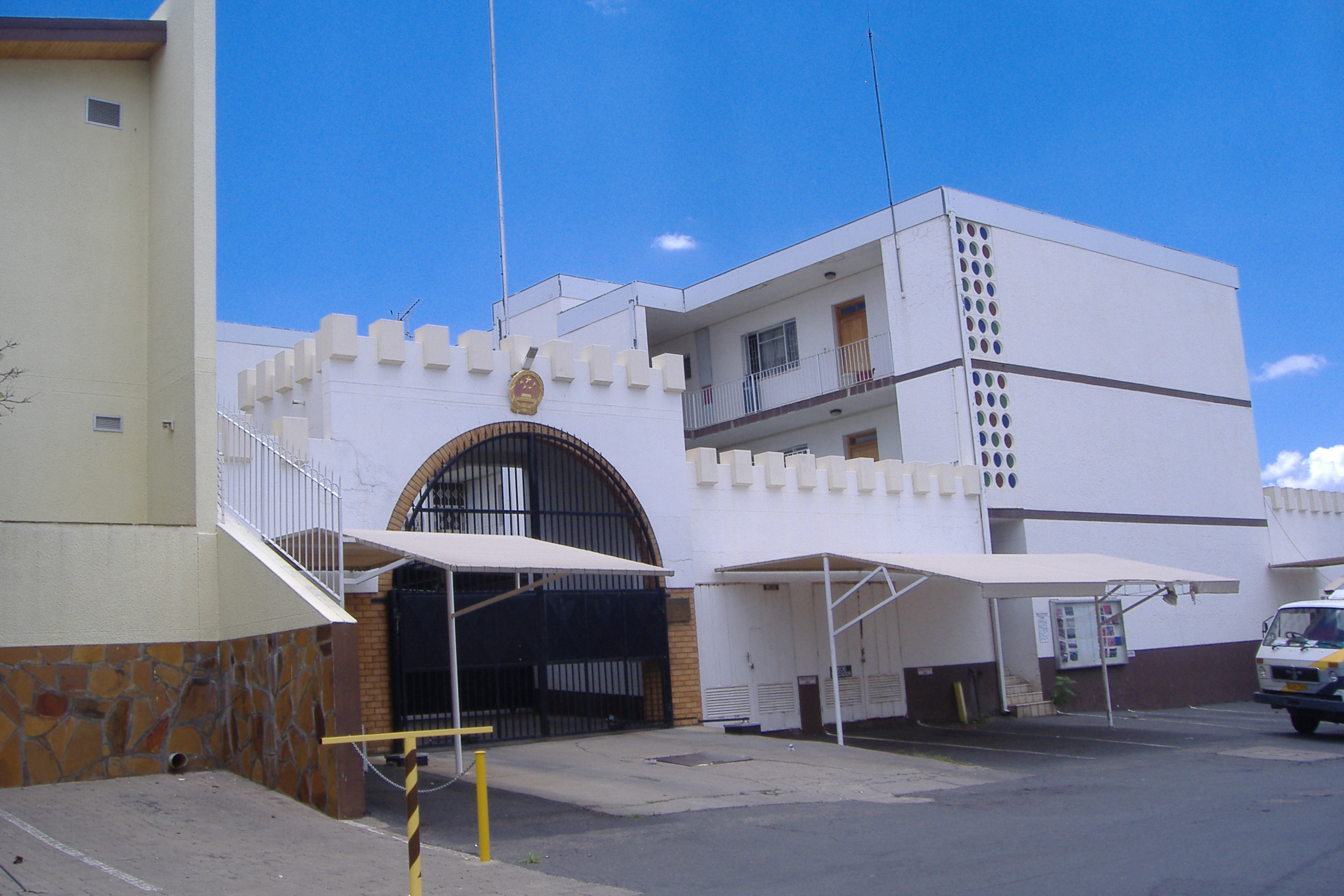
Embassy in Windhoek

=== Americas ===
Host country	Host city	Mission	Concurrent accreditation	Ref.
Antigua and Barbuda	St. John's	Embassy		
Argentina	Buenos Aires	Embassy		
Bahamas	Nassau	Embassy		
Barbados	Bridgetown	Embassy		
Bolivia	La Paz	Embassy		
Bolivia	Santa Cruz de la Sierra	Consulate-General		
Brazil	Brasília	Embassy		
Brazil	Recife	Consulate General		
Brazil	Rio de Janeiro	Consulate-General		
Brazil	São Paulo	Consulate-General		
Canada	Ottawa	Embassy		
Canada	Calgary	Consulate-General		
Canada	Montreal	Consulate-General		
Canada	Toronto	Consulate-General		
Canada	Vancouver	Consulate-General		
Chile	Santiago de Chile	Embassy		
Colombia	Bogotá	Embassy		
Costa Rica	San José	Embassy		
Cuba	Havana	Embassy		
Dominica	Roseau	Embassy		
Dominican Republic	Santo Domingo	Embassy		
Ecuador	Quito	Embassy		
Ecuador	Guayaquil	Consulate-General		
El Salvador	San Salvador	Embassy		
Grenada	St. George's	Embassy		
Guyana	Georgetown	Embassy		
Haiti	Port-au-Prince	Representative office		
Honduras	Tegucigalpa	Embassy		
Jamaica	Kingston	Embassy		
Mexico	Mexico City	Embassy		
Mexico	Tijuana	Consulate-General		
Nicaragua	Managua	Embassy		
Panama	Panama City	Embassy		
Peru	Lima	Embassy		
Suriname	Paramaribo	Embassy		
Trinidad and Tobago	Port of Spain	Embassy		
United States	Washington, D.C.	Embassy		
United States	Chicago	Consulate-General		
United States	Los Angeles	Consulate-General		
United States	New York City	Consulate-General		
United States	San Francisco	Consulate-General		
Uruguay	Montevideo	Embassy		
Venezuela	Caracas	Embassy		

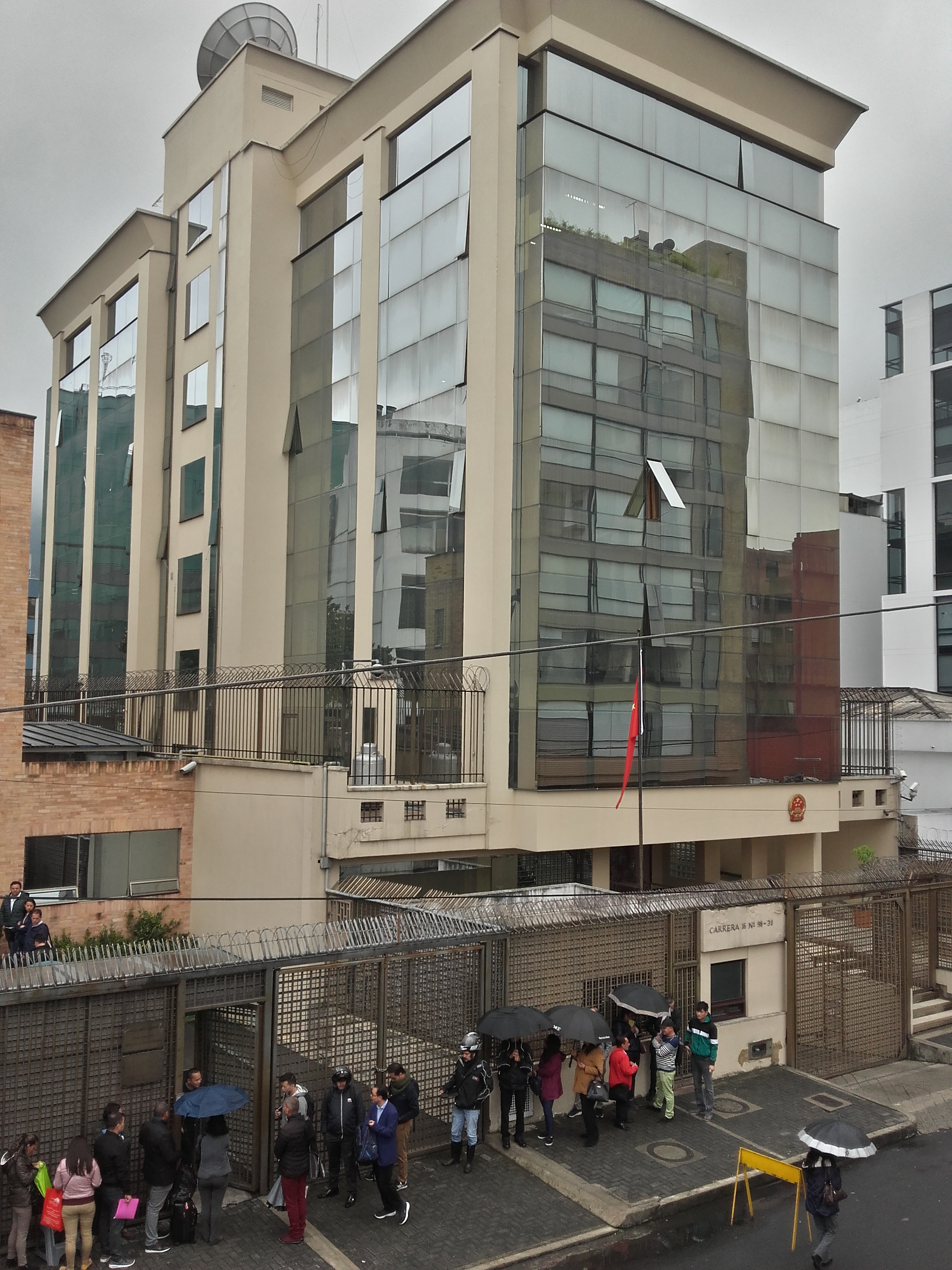
Embassy in Bogotá

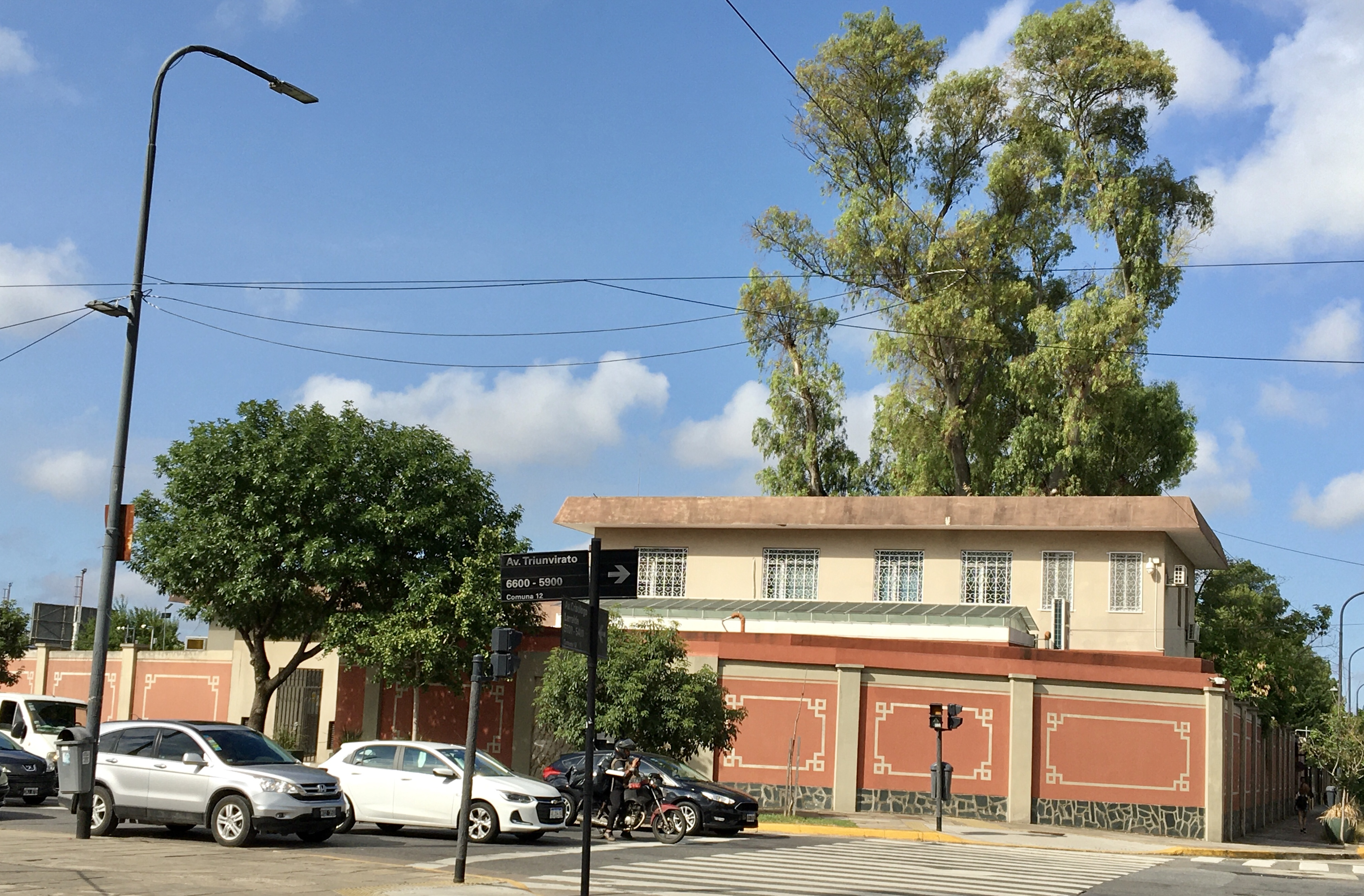
Embassy in Buenos Aires

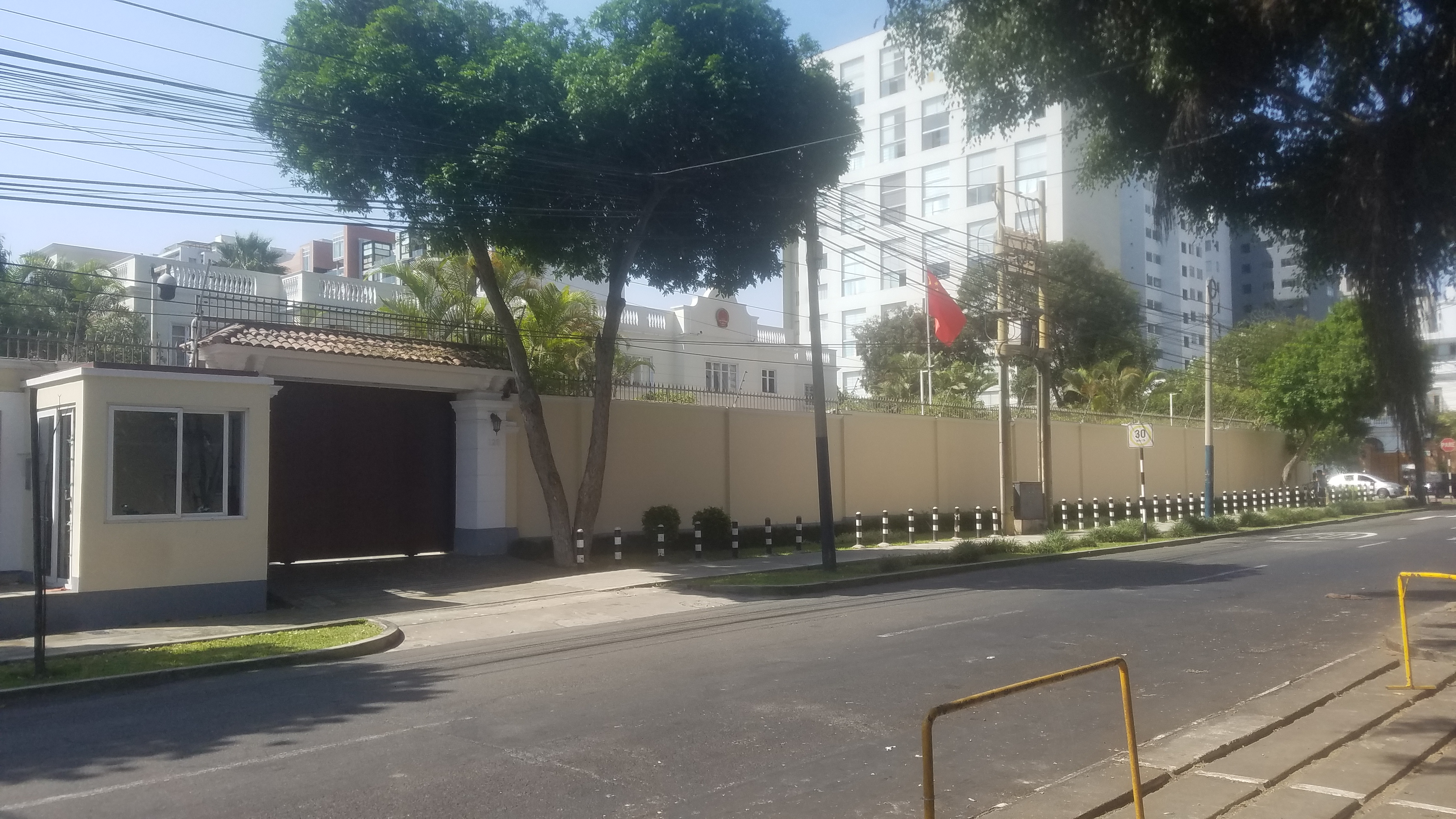
Embassy in Lima

Embassy in Mexico City

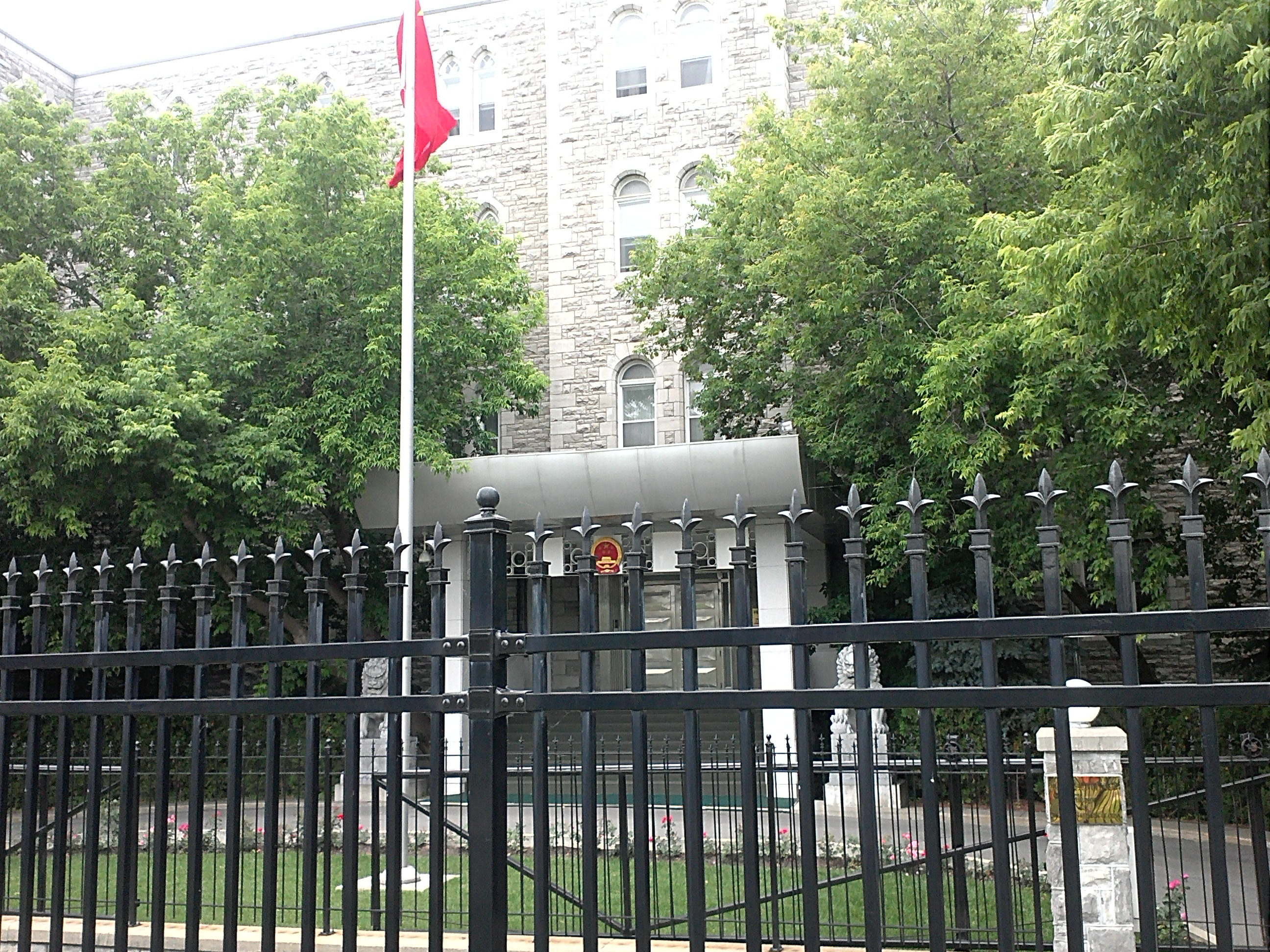
Embassy in Ottawa

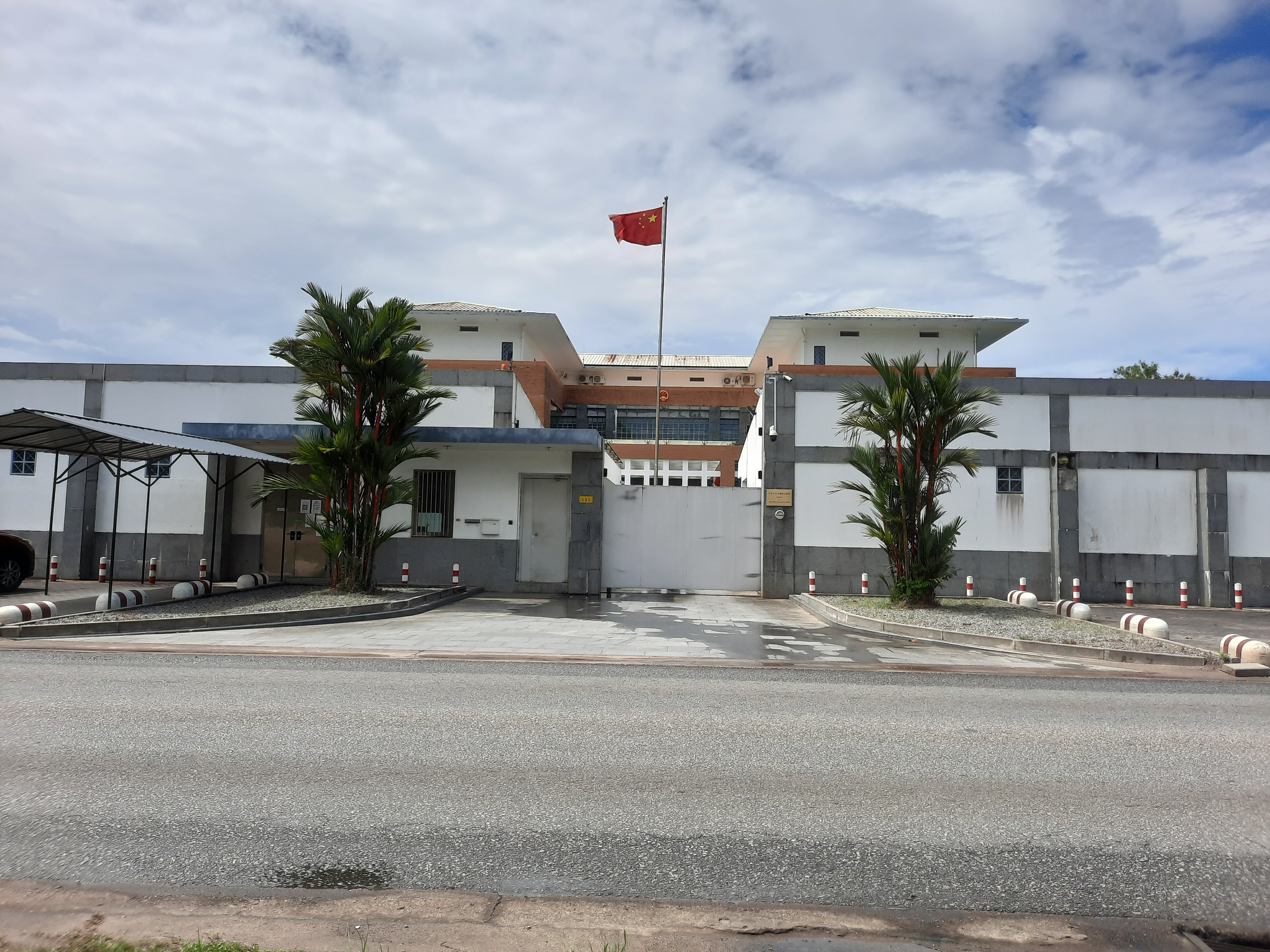
Embassy in Paramaribo

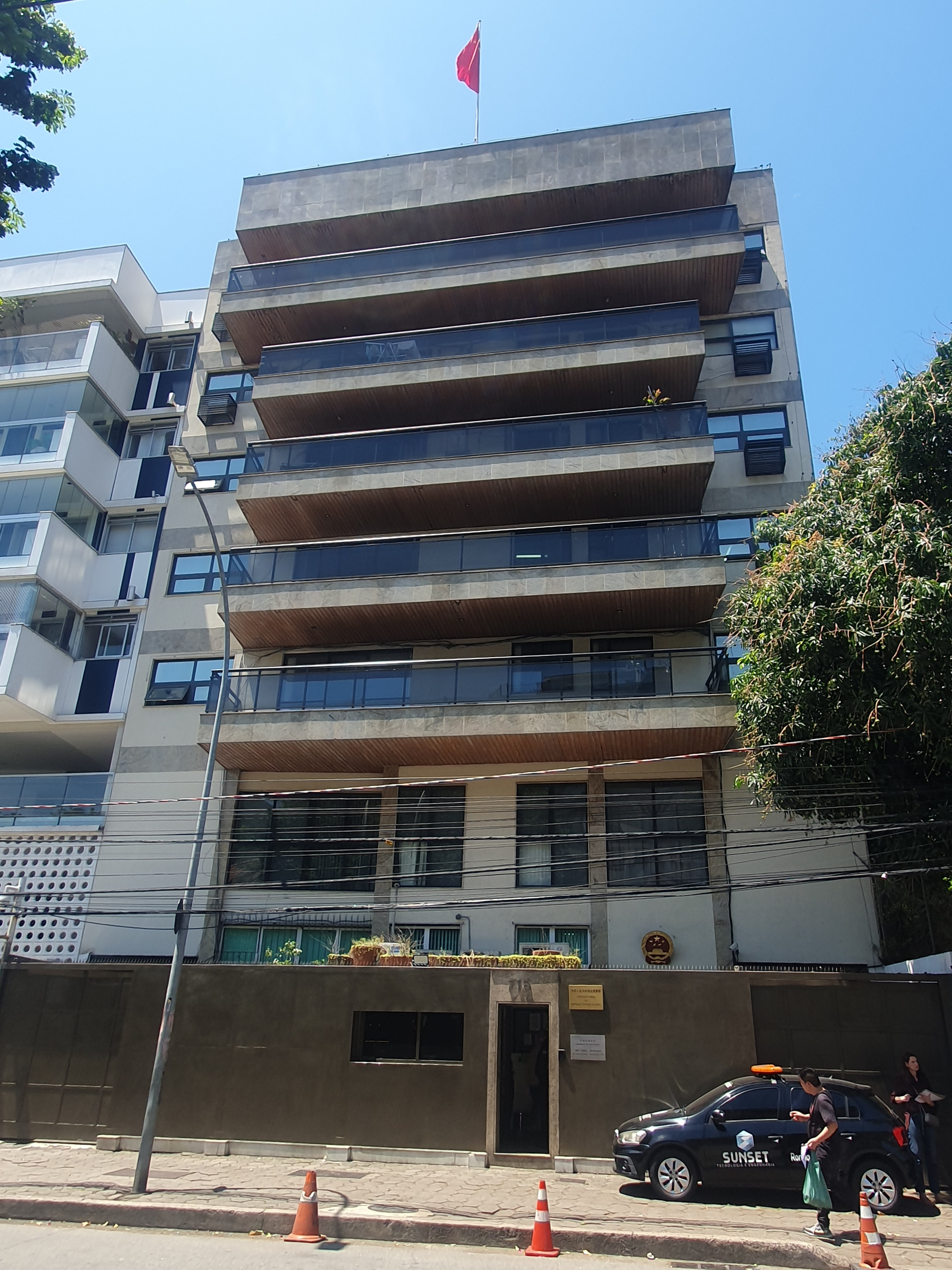
Consulate General in Rio de Janeiro

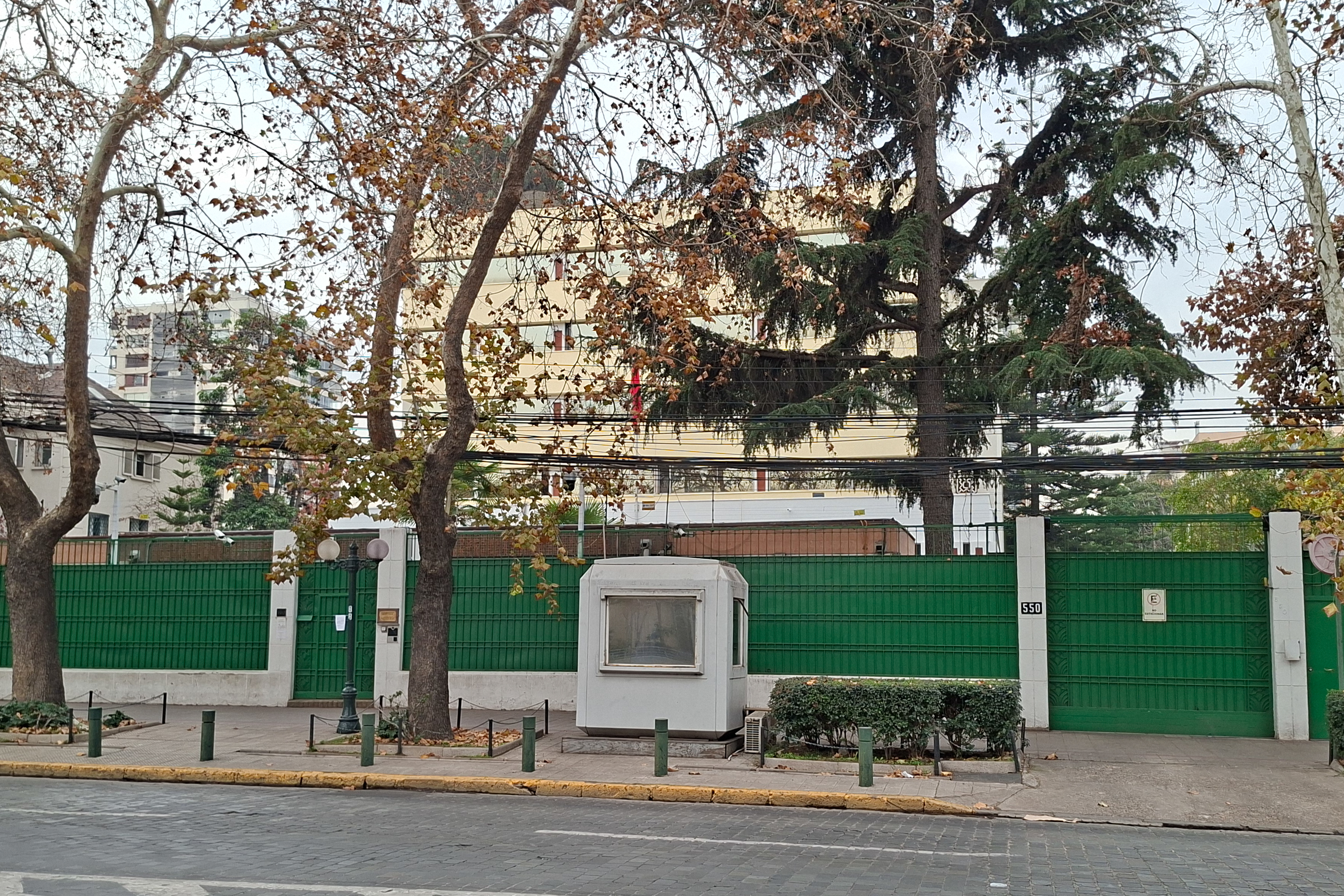
Embassy in Santiago

Embassy in Santo Domingo

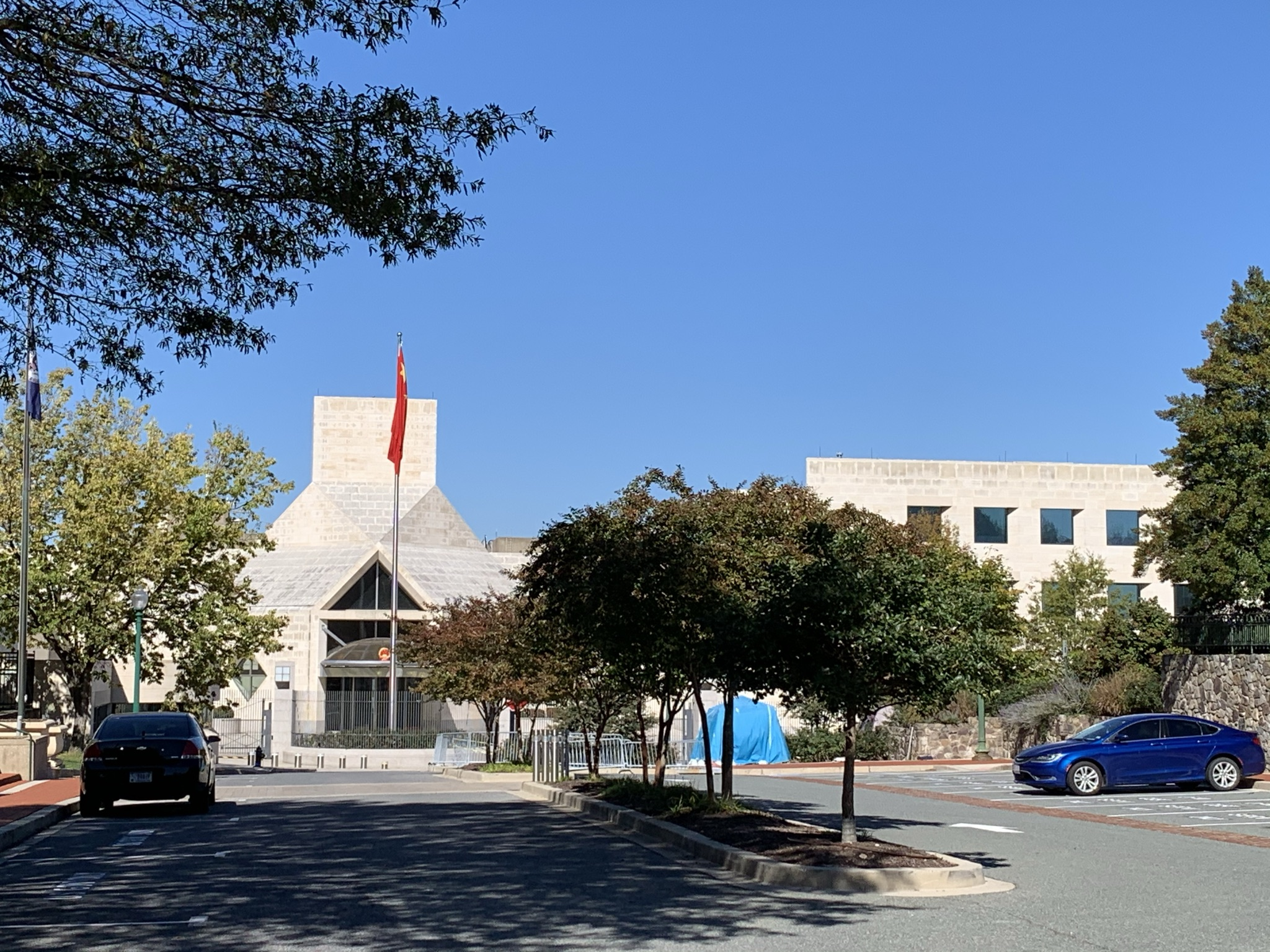
Embassy in Washington, D.C.

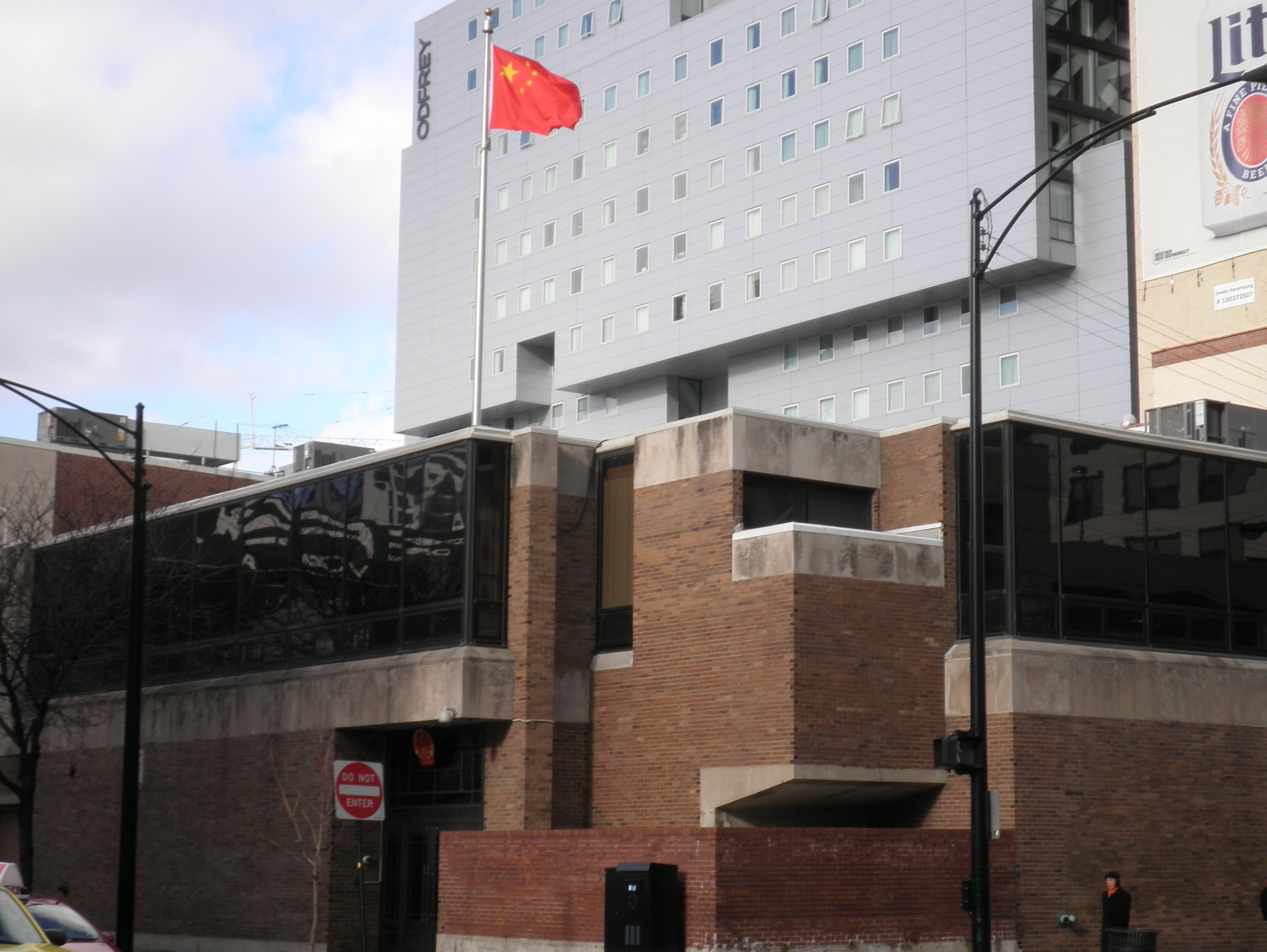
Consulate General in Chicago

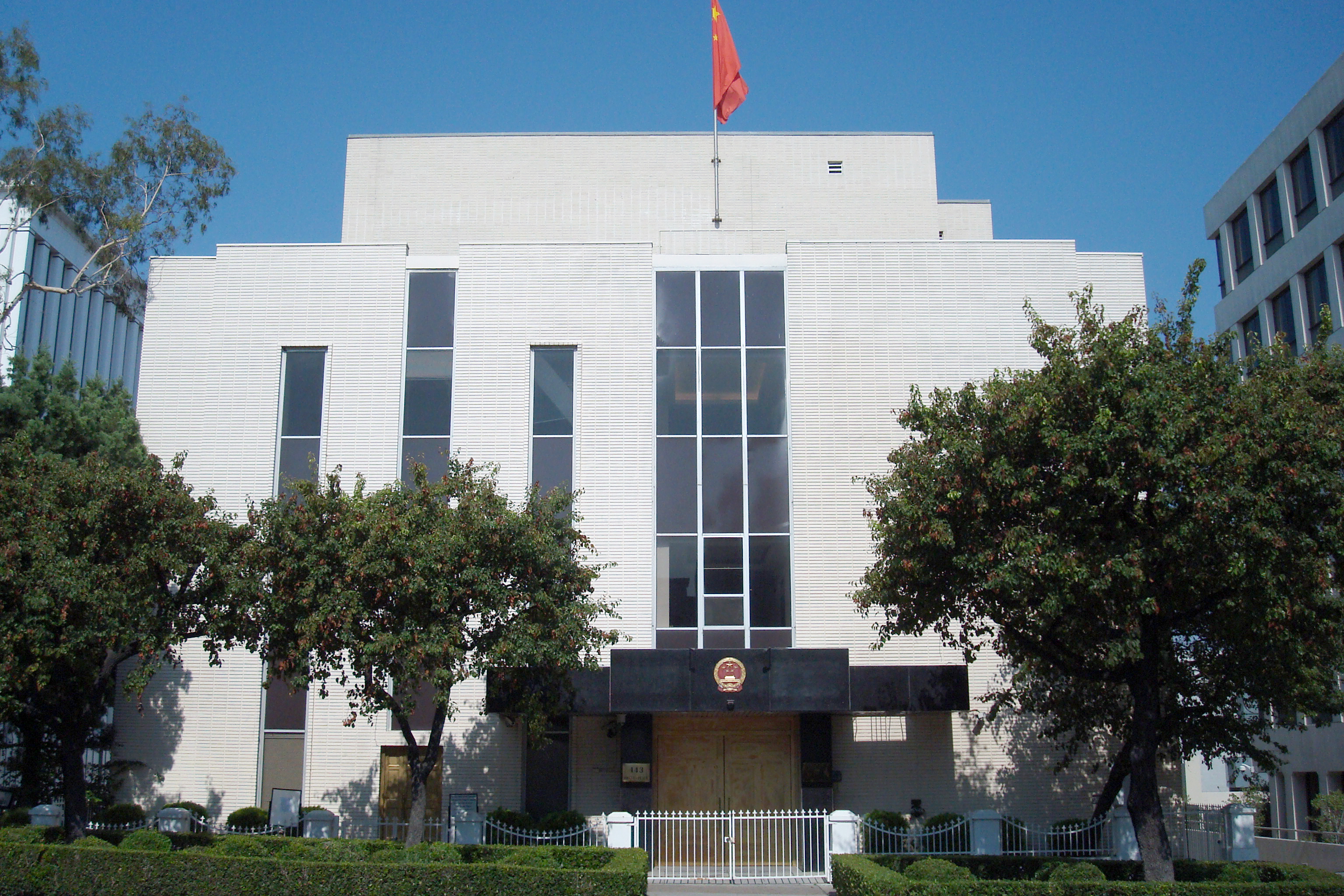
Consulate General in Los Angeles

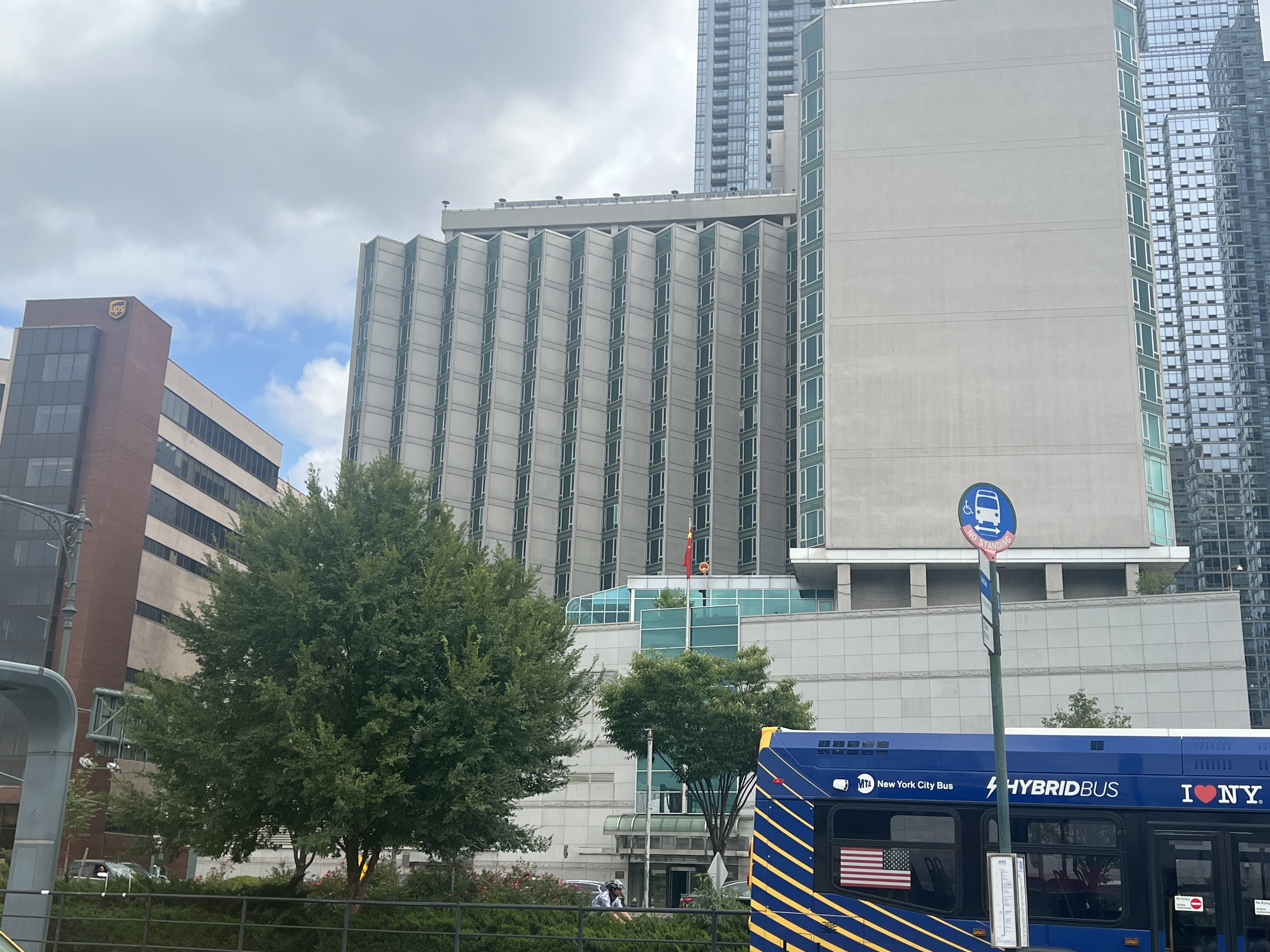
Consulate General in New York City

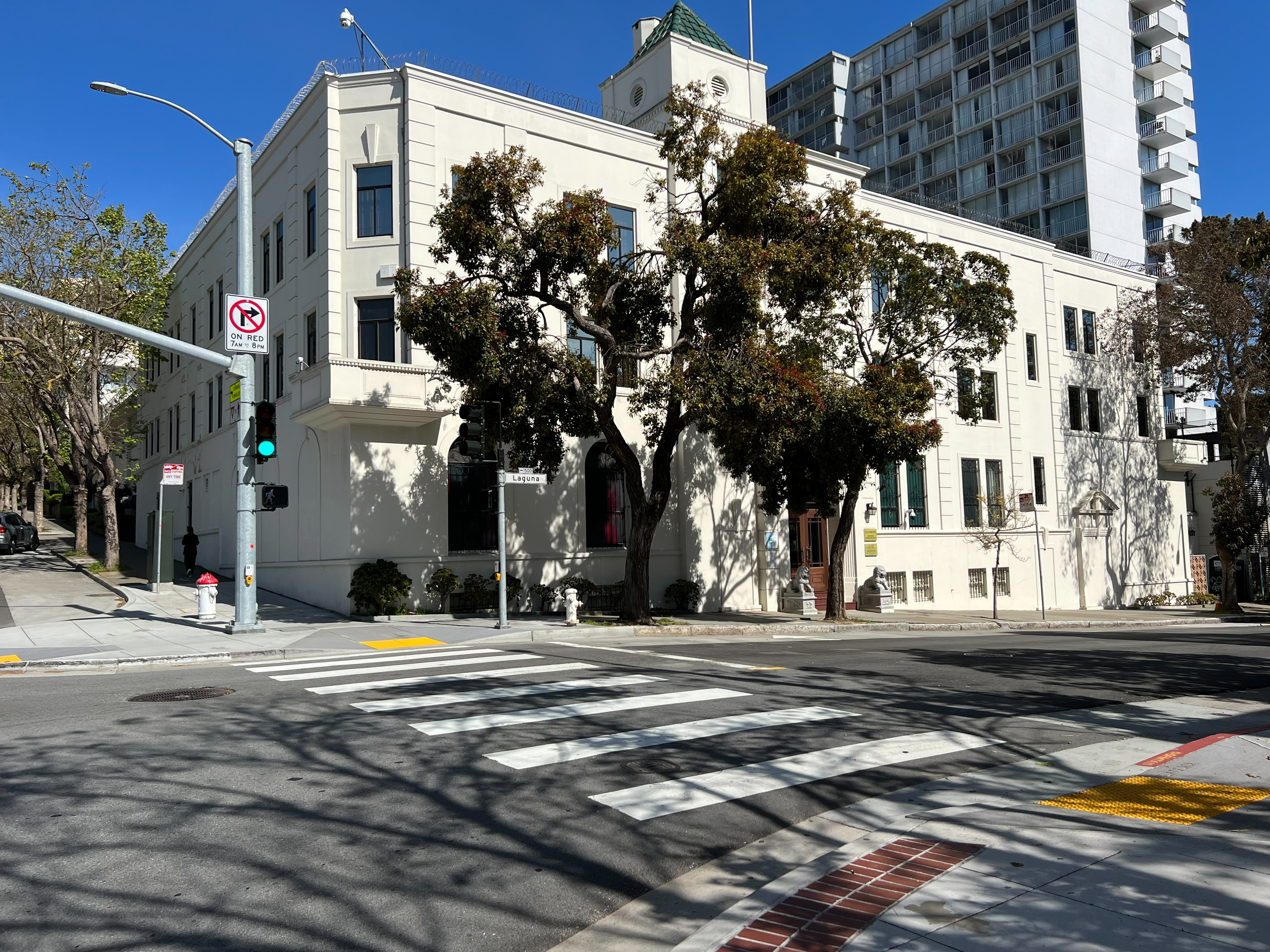
Consulate General in San Francisco

=== Asia ===
Host country	Host city	Mission	Concurrent accreditation	Ref.
Afghanistan	Kabul	Embassy		
Armenia	Yerevan	Embassy		
Azerbaijan	Baku	Embassy		
Bahrain	Manama	Embassy		
Bangladesh	Dhaka	Embassy		
Brunei	Bandar Seri Begawan	Embassy		
Cambodia	Phnom Penh	Embassy		
Georgia	Tbilisi	Embassy		
India	New Delhi	Embassy		
India	Kolkata	Consulate-General		
India	Mumbai	Consulate-General		
Indonesia	Jakarta	Embassy		
Indonesia	Denpasar	Consulate-General		
Indonesia	Medan	Consulate-General		
Indonesia	Surabaya	Consulate-General		
Iran	Tehran	Embassy		
Iran	Bandar Abbas	Consulate-General		
Iraq	Baghdad	Embassy		
Iraq	Basra	Consulate General		
Iraq	Erbil	Consulate-General		
Israel	Tel Aviv	Embassy		
Japan	Tokyo	Embassy		
Japan	Fukuoka	Consulate-General		
Japan	Nagasaki	Consulate-General		
Japan	Nagoya	Consulate-General		
Japan	Niigata	Consulate-General		
Japan	Osaka	Consulate-General		
Japan	Sapporo	Consulate-General		
Jordan	Amman	Embassy		
Kazakhstan	Astana	Embassy		
Kazakhstan	Aktobe	Consulate General		
Kazakhstan	Almaty	Consulate-General		
Kuwait	Kuwait City	Embassy		
Kyrgyzstan	Bishkek	Embassy		
Laos	Vientiane	Embassy		
Laos	Luang Prabang	Consulate-General		
Lebanon	Beirut	Embassy		
Malaysia	Kuala Lumpur	Embassy		
Malaysia	George Town	Consulate-General		
Malaysia	Kota Kinabalu	Consulate-General		
Malaysia	Kuching	Consulate-General		
Maldives	Malé	Embassy		
Mongolia	Ulaanbaatar	Embassy		
Mongolia	Zamyn-Üüd	Consulate-General		
Myanmar	Yangon	Embassy		
Myanmar	Mandalay (Note: Originally established in Lashio, the consulate-general was transferred to Mandalay in 1962.)	Consulate-General		
Nepal	Kathmandu	Embassy		
North Korea	Pyongyang	Embassy		
North Korea	Chongjin	Consulate General		
Oman	Muscat	Embassy		
Pakistan	Islamabad	Embassy		
Pakistan	Karachi	Consulate-General		
Pakistan	Lahore	Consulate-General		
Palestine	Ramallah	Office		
Philippines	Manila	Embassy		
Philippines	Cebu City	Consulate-General		
Philippines	Davao City	Consulate-General		
Philippines	Laoag	Consulate		
Qatar	Doha	Embassy		
Saudi Arabia	Riyadh	Embassy		
Saudi Arabia	Jeddah	Consulate-General		
Singapore	Singapore	Embassy		
South Korea	Seoul	Embassy		
South Korea	Busan	Consulate-General		
South Korea	Gwangju	Consulate-General		
South Korea	Jeju City	Consulate-General		
Sri Lanka	Colombo	Embassy		
Syria	Damascus	Embassy (Note: The embassy was downgraded to a consulate-general from 1958 to 1961 during Syria's political union with Egypt as the United Arab Republic, before being restored to full embassy status upon the union's dissolution.)		
Tajikistan	Dushanbe	Embassy		
Thailand	Bangkok	Embassy		
Thailand	Chiang Mai	Consulate-General		
Thailand	Khon Kaen	Consulate-General		
Thailand	Songkhla	Consulate-General		
Thailand	Phuket	Consular Office		
Timor-Leste	Dili	Embassy		
Turkey	Ankara	Embassy		
Turkey	Istanbul	Consulate-General		
Turkmenistan	Ashgabat	Embassy		
United Arab Emirates	Abu Dhabi	Embassy		
United Arab Emirates	Dubai	Consulate-General		
Uzbekistan	Tashkent	Embassy		
Vietnam	Hanoi	Embassy		
Vietnam	Da Nang	Consulate-General		
Vietnam	Ho Chi Minh City	Consulate-General		

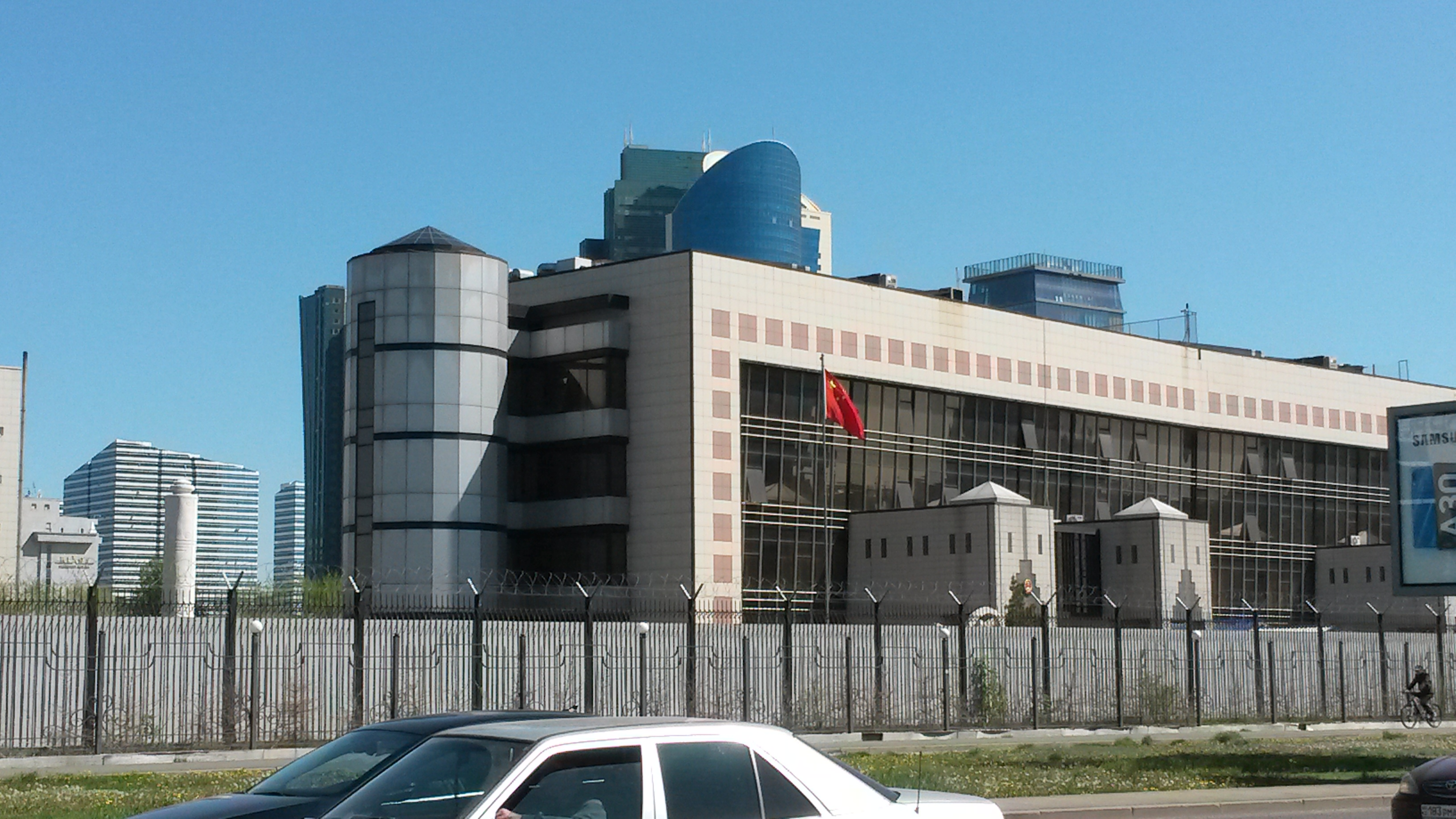
Embassy in Astana

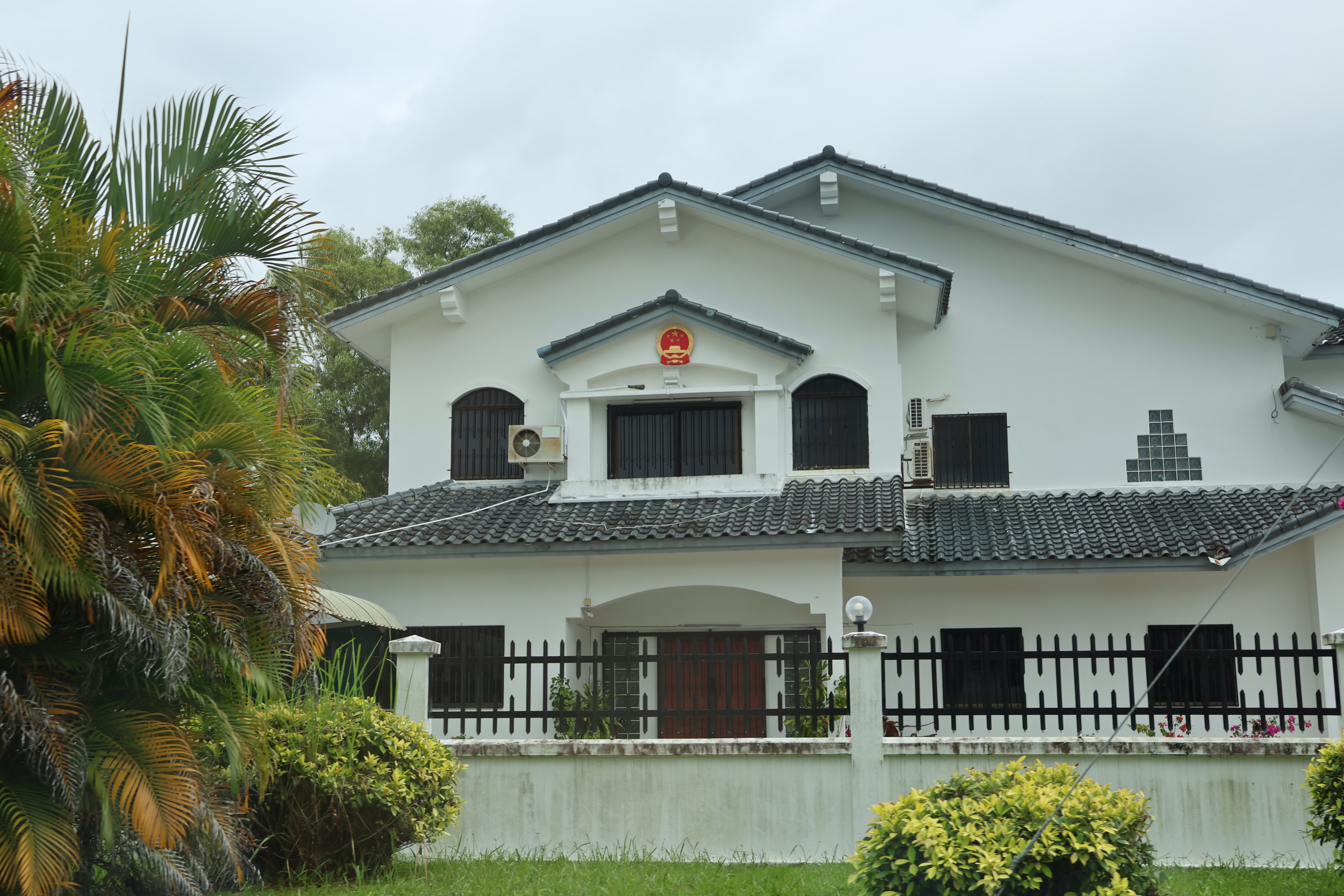
Embassy in Bandar Seri Begawan

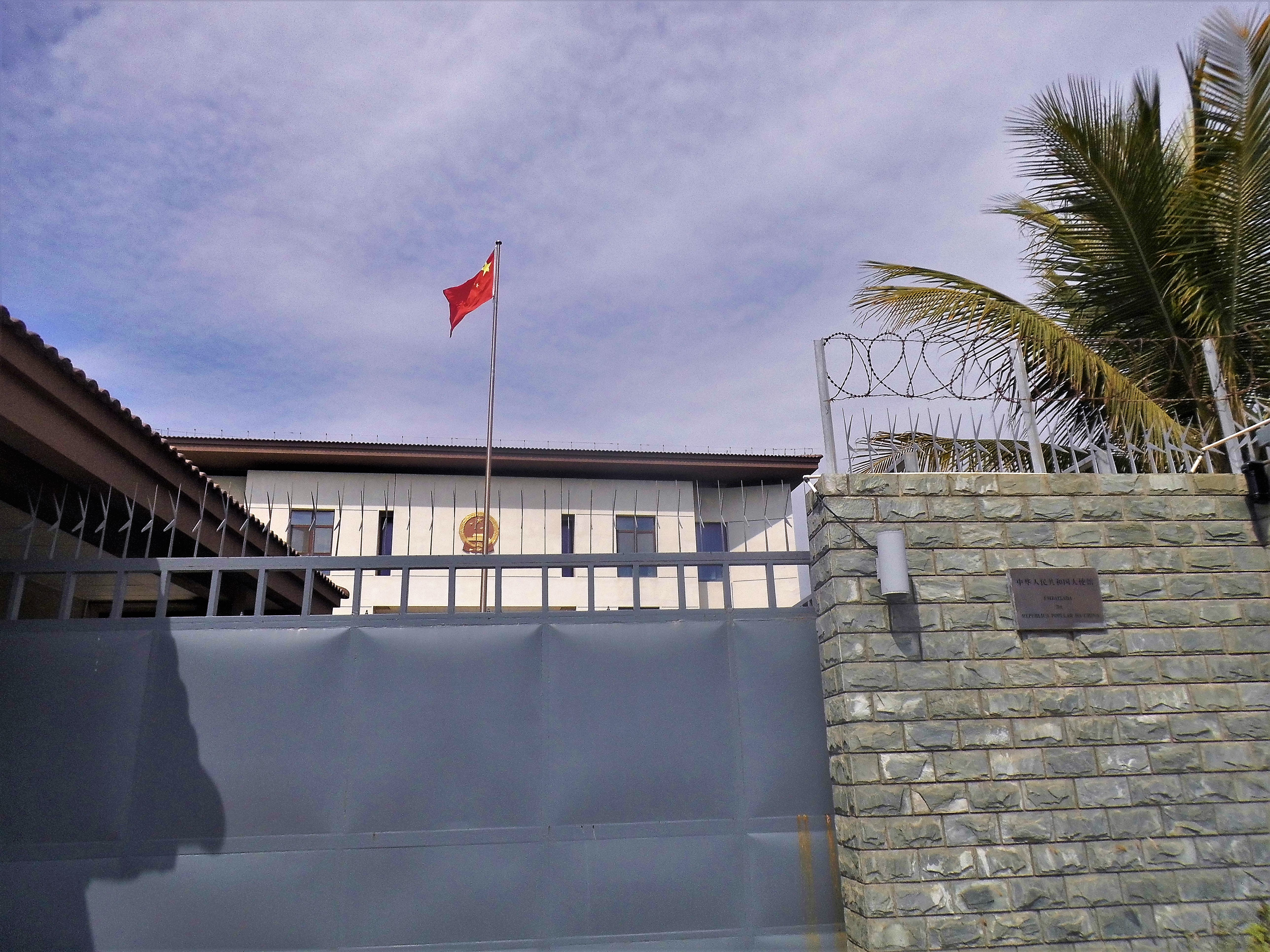
Embassy in Dili

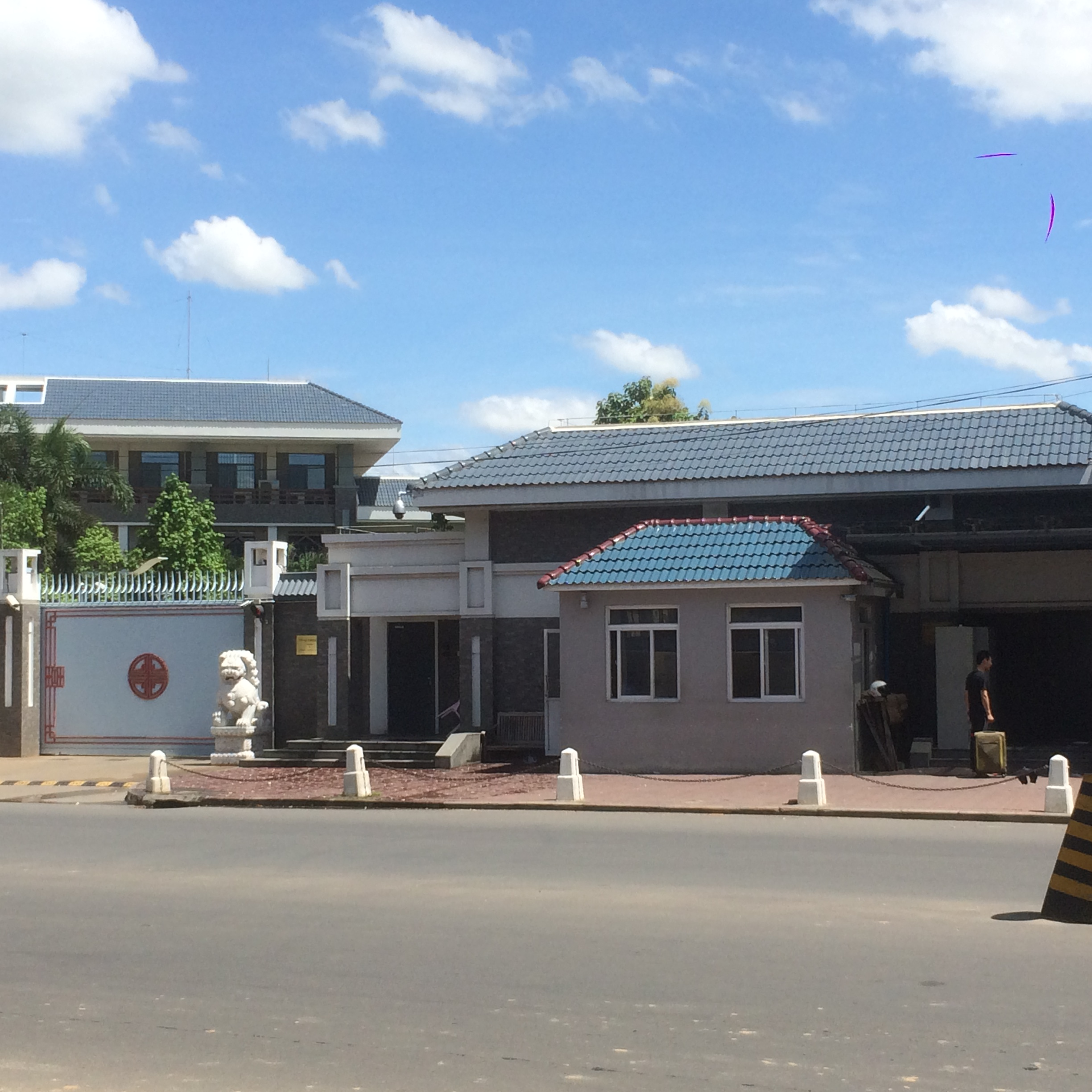
Embassy in Phnom Penh

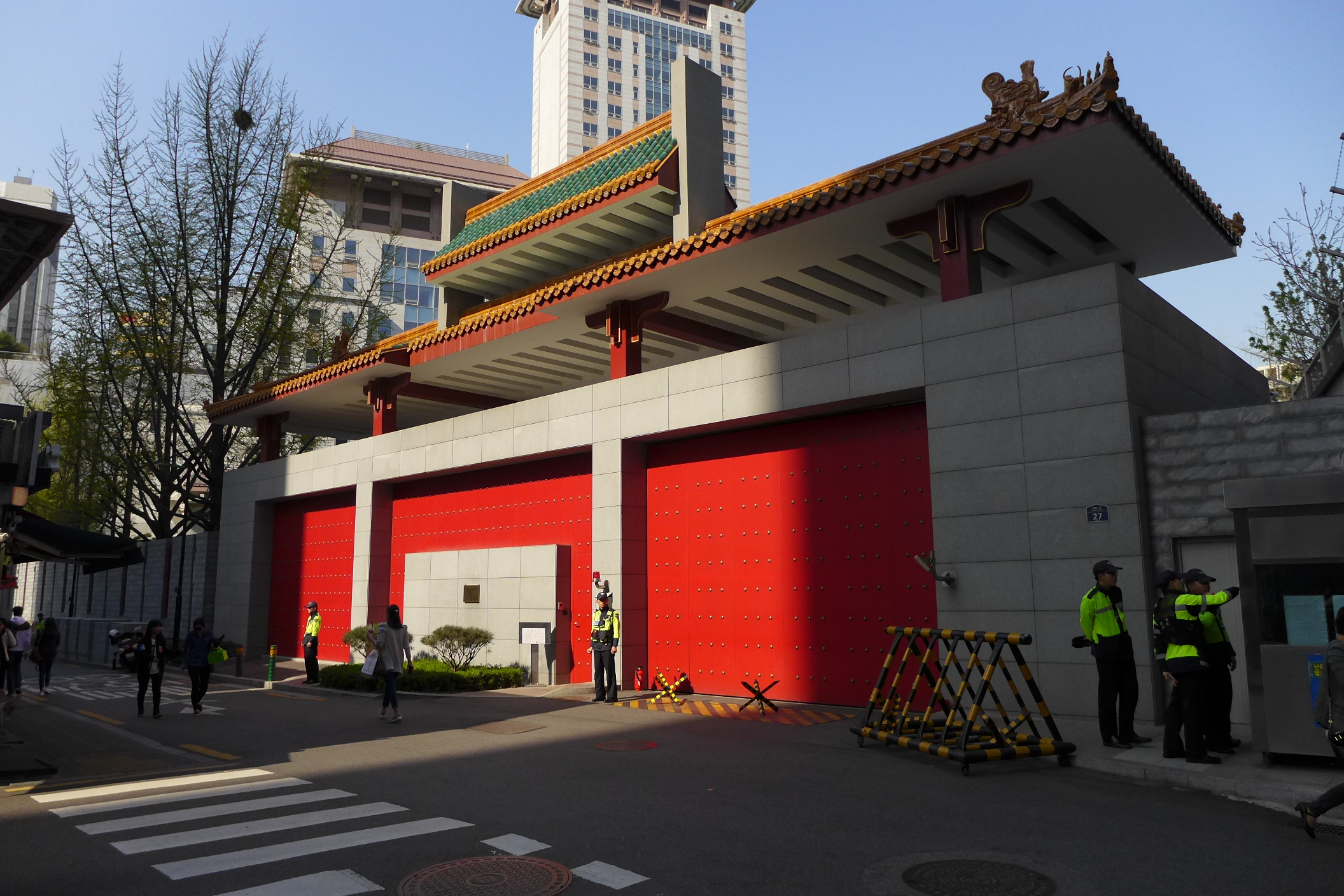
Embassy in Seoul

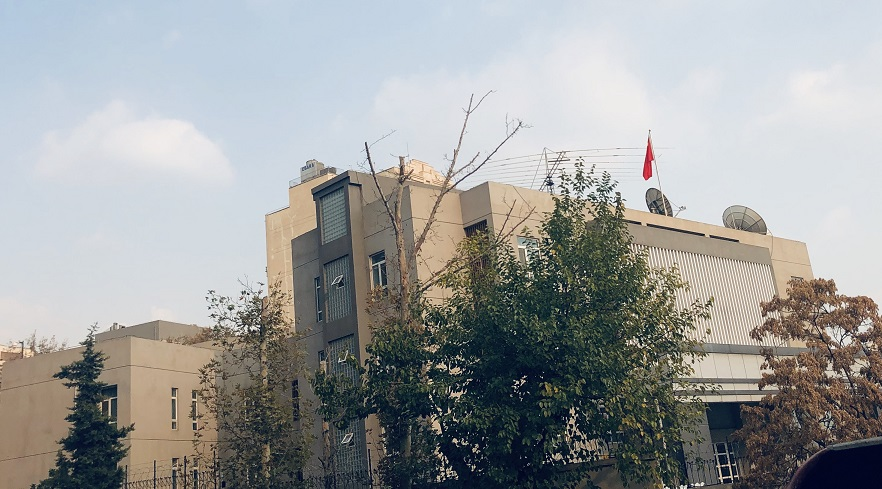
Embassy in Tehran

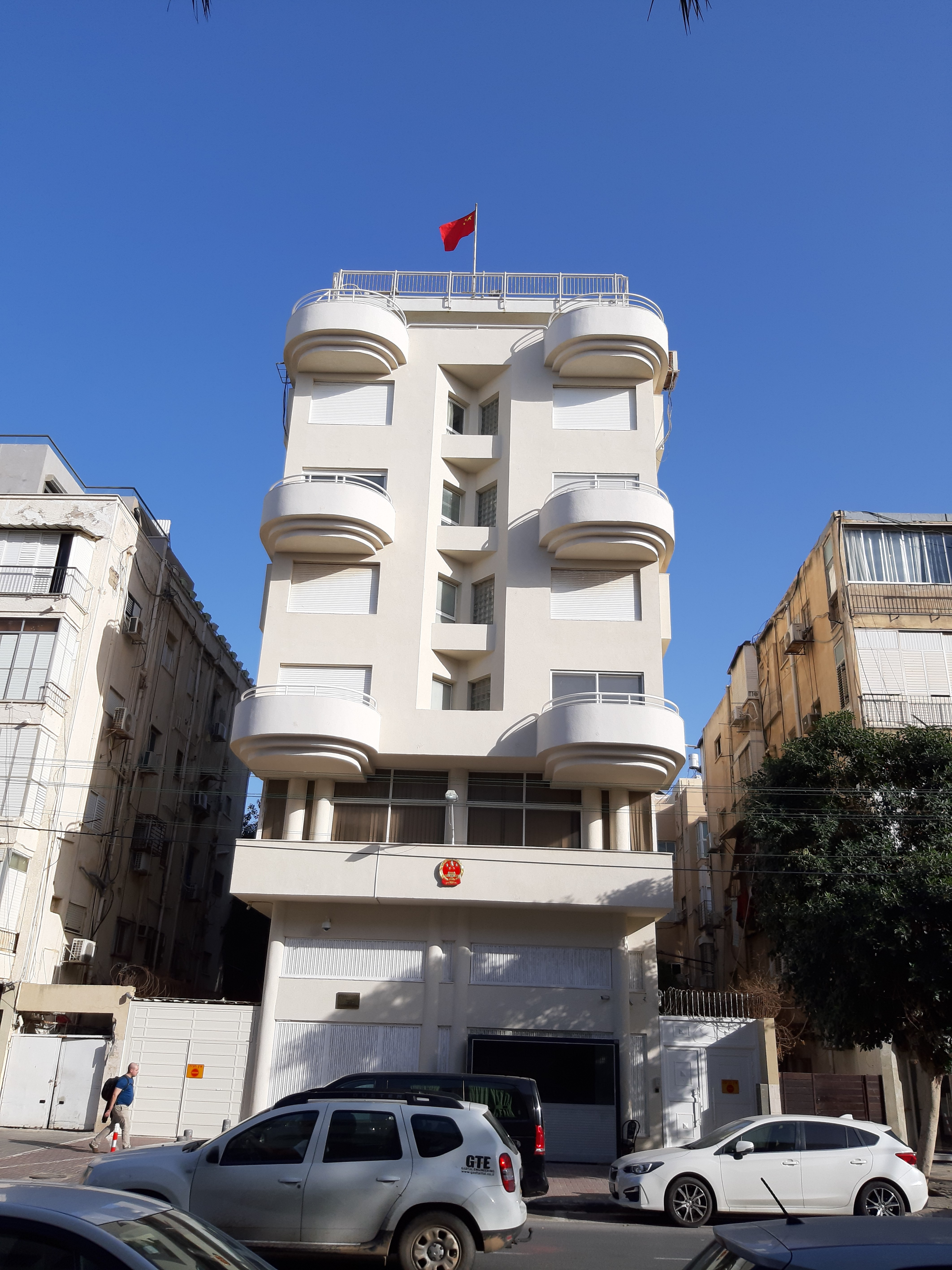
Embassy in Tel Aviv

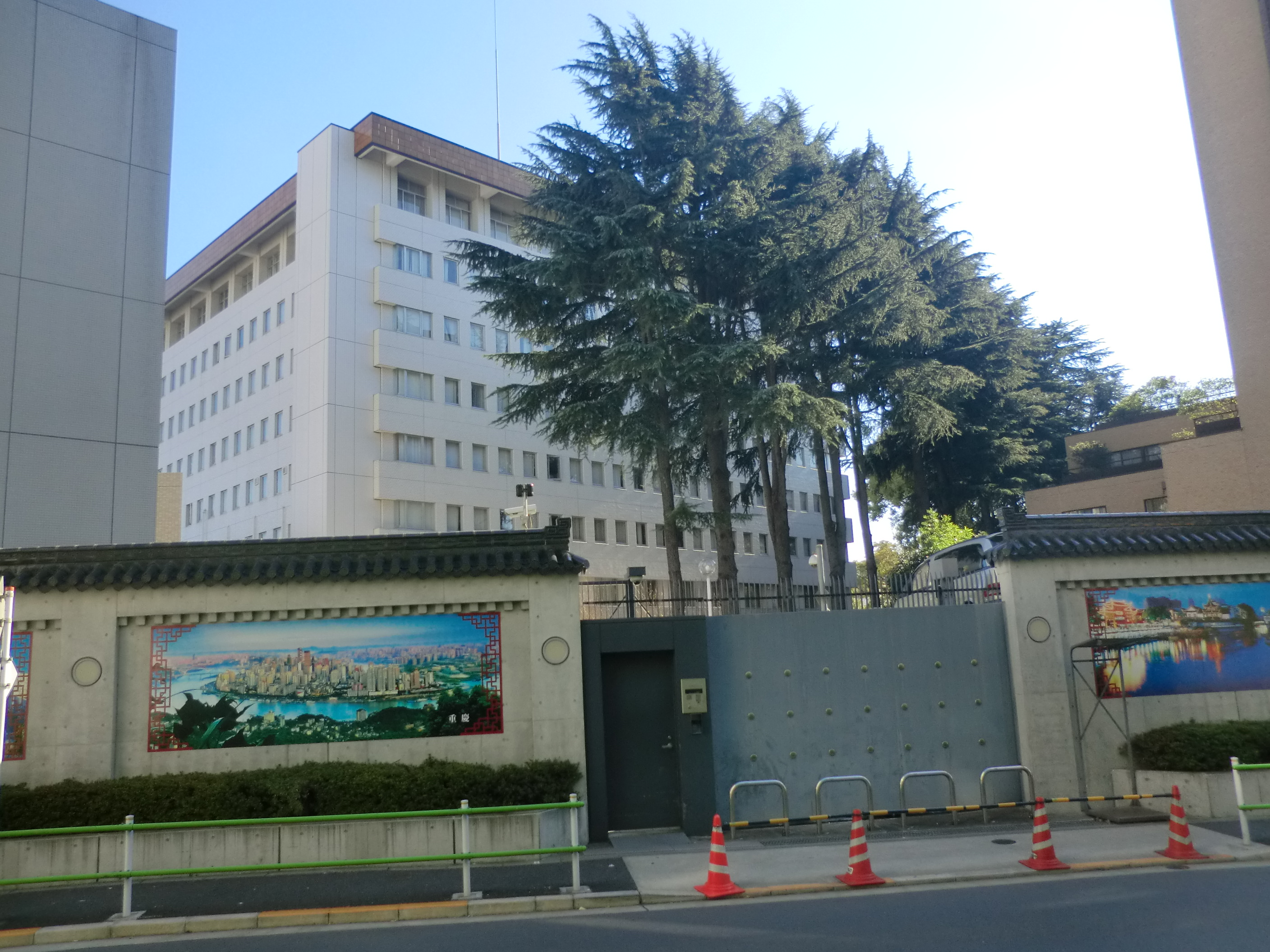
Embassy in Tokyo

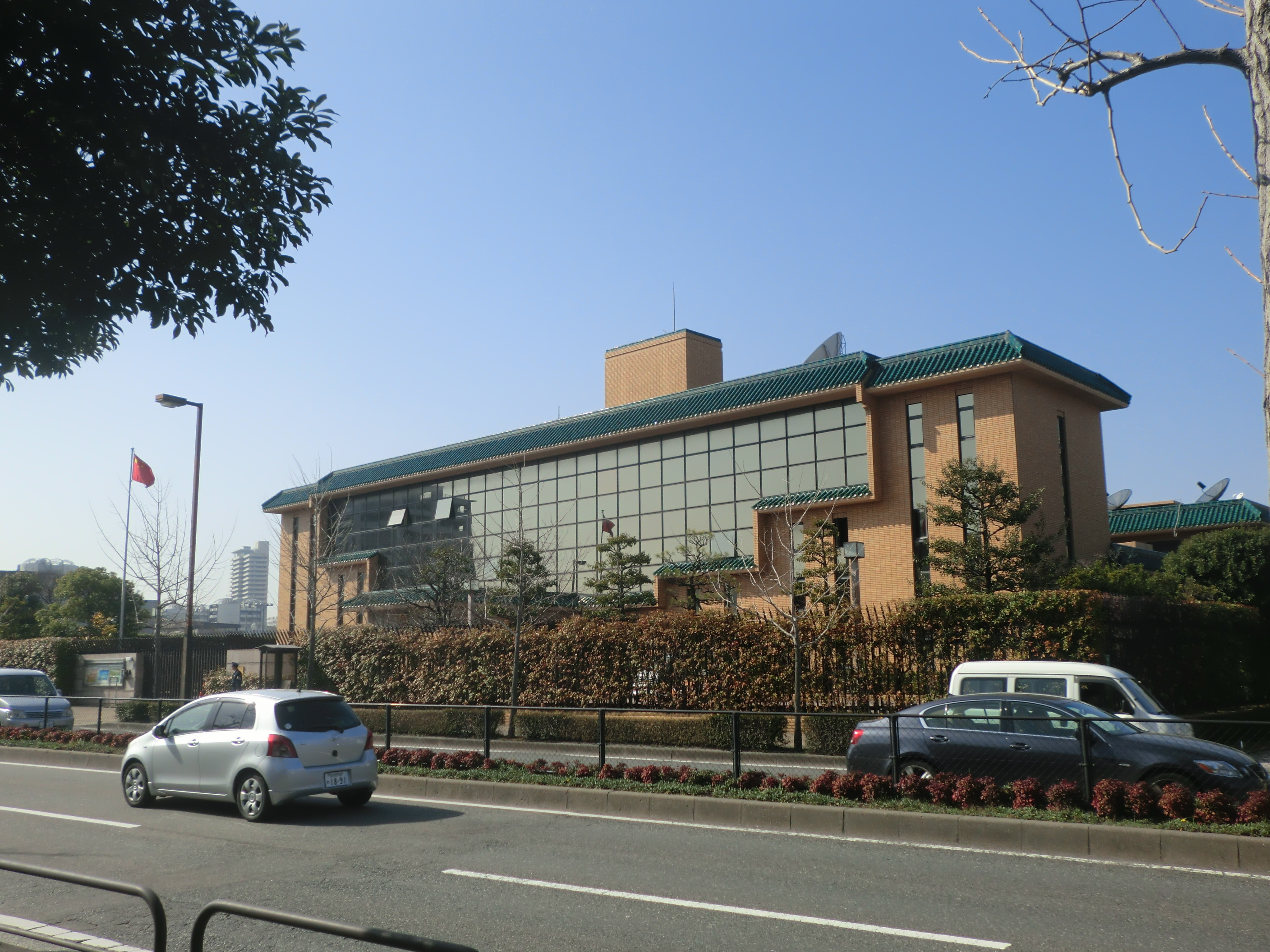
Consulate General in Fukuoka

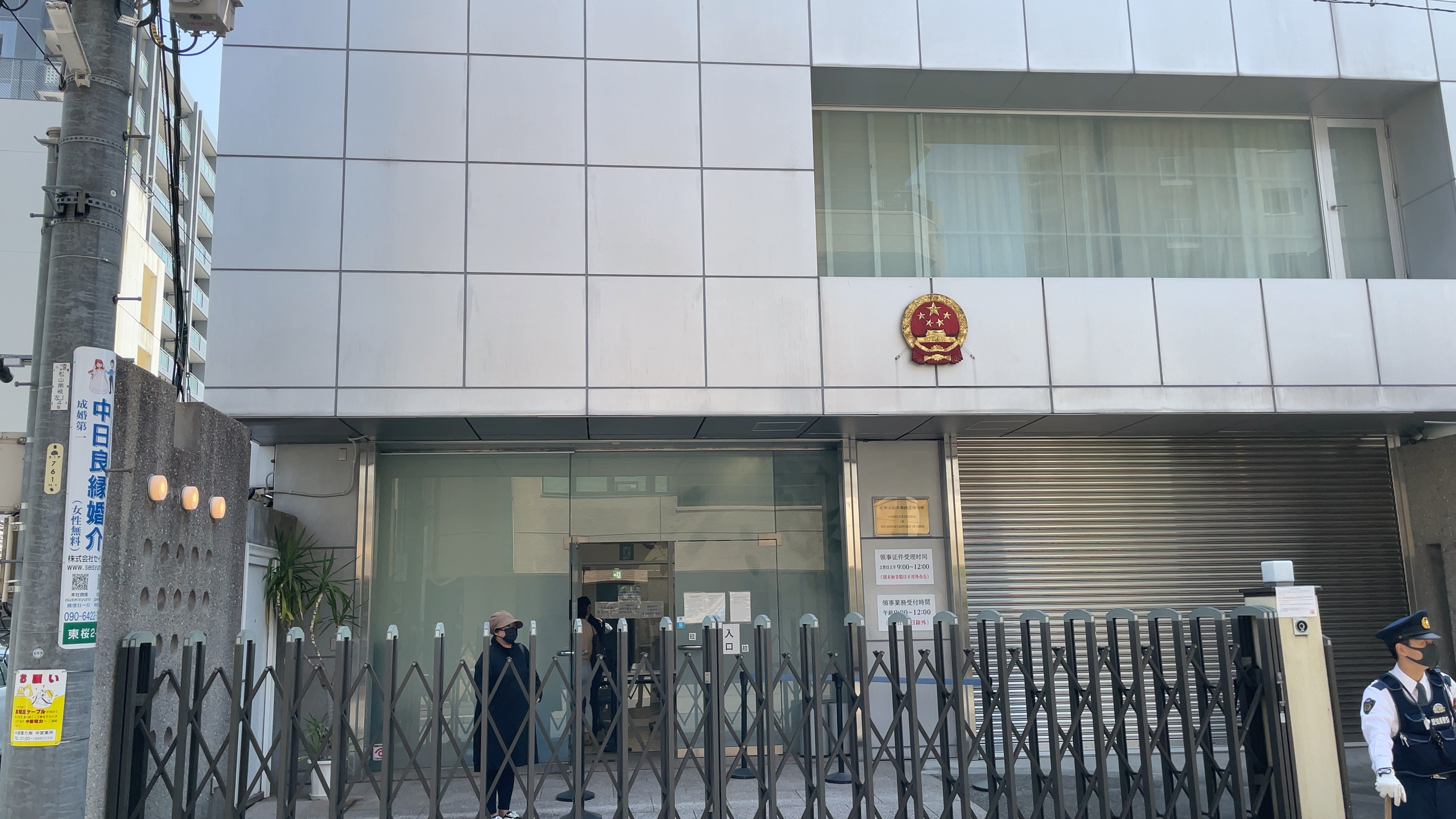
Consulate General in Nagoya

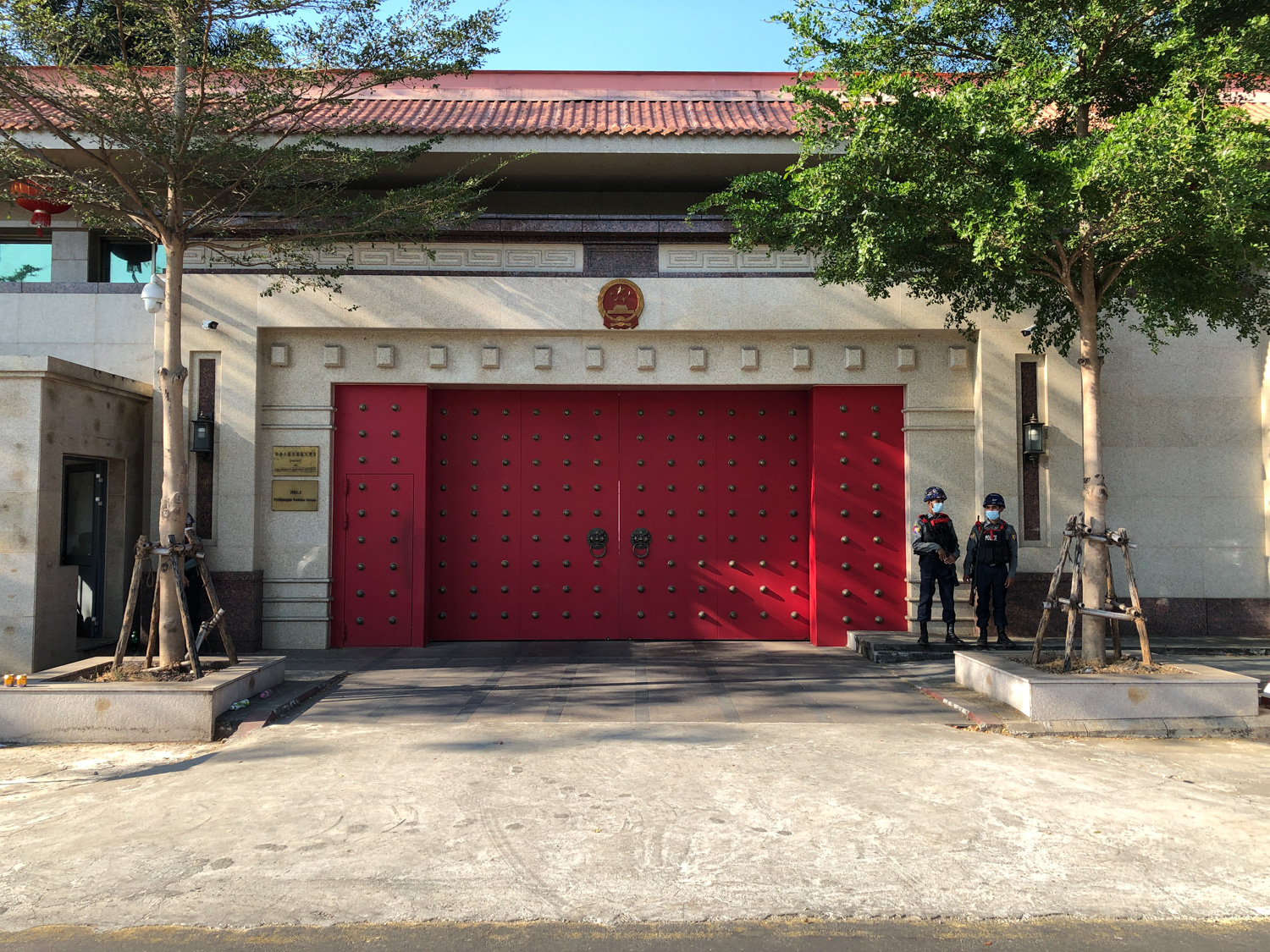
Embassy in Yangon

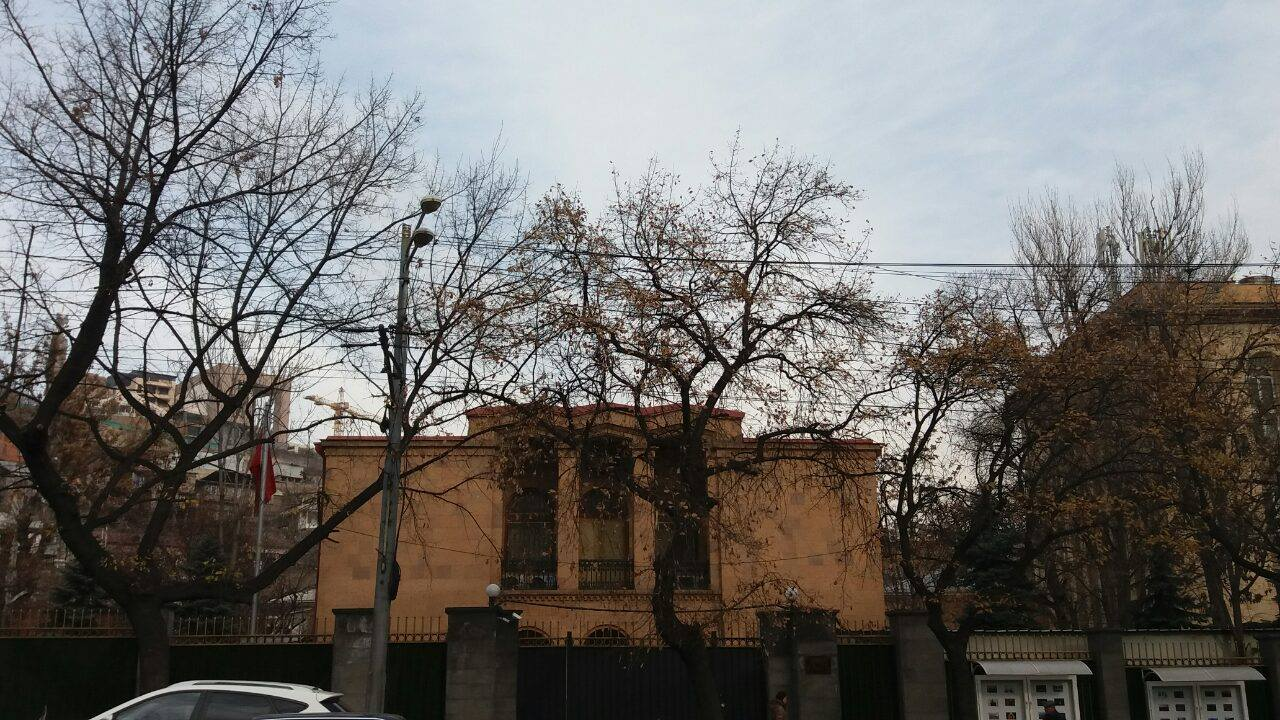
Embassy in Yerevan

=== Europe ===
Host country	Host city	Mission	Concurrent accreditation	Ref.
Albania	Tirana	Embassy		
Austria	Vienna	Embassy		
Belarus	Minsk	Embassy		
Belgium	Brussels	Embassy		
Bosnia and Herzegovina	Sarajevo	Embassy		
Bulgaria	Sofia	Embassy		
Croatia	Zagreb	Embassy		
Cyprus	Nicosia	Embassy		
Czechia	Prague	Embassy		
Denmark	Copenhagen	Embassy		
Estonia	Tallinn	Embassy		
Finland	Helsinki	Embassy		
France	Paris	Embassy	Country: Monaco	
France	Lyon	Consulate-General	Country: Monaco	
France	Marseille	Consulate-General	Country: Monaco	
France	Strasbourg	Consulate-General	Country: Monaco	
France	Saint-Denis, Réunion	Consulate-General	Country: Monaco	
France	Papeete, French Polynesia	Consulate	Country: Monaco	
Germany	Berlin	Embassy		
Germany	Bonn	Embassy branch office (Note: Established in 1973 as the embassy to West Germany. Following the reunification of Germany in 1990 and the subsequent transfer of the capital city, the embassy relocated to Berlin in 1999, and the Bonn facility was downscaled to a branch office, which remains operational to this day.)		
Germany	Düsseldorf	Consulate-General		
Germany	Frankfurt	Consulate-General		
Germany	Hamburg	Consulate-General		
Germany	Munich	Consulate-General		
Greece	Athens	Embassy		
Hungary	Budapest	Embassy		
Iceland	Reykjavík	Embassy		
Ireland	Dublin	Embassy		
Italy	Rome	Embassy	Country: San Marino	
Italy	Florence	Consulate-General	Country: San Marino	
Italy	Milan	Consulate-General	Country: San Marino	
Latvia	Riga	Embassy		
Lithuania	Vilnius	Office of the Chargé d'Affaires (Note: The embassy was downgraded to an "office of the Chargé d'Affaires" in 2021, following a diplomatic dispute over the opening of a Taiwanese representative office in Vilnius.)		
Luxembourg	Luxembourg City	Embassy		
Malta	Attard	Embassy		
Moldova	Chișinău	Embassy		
Montenegro	Podgorica	Embassy		
Netherlands	The Hague	Embassy		
Netherlands	Willemstad, Curaçao	Consulate General		
North Macedonia	Skopje	Embassy		
Norway	Oslo	Embassy		
Poland	Warsaw	Embassy		
Portugal	Lisbon	Embassy		
Romania	Bucharest	Embassy		
Russia	Moscow	Embassy		
Russia	Irkutsk	Consulate-General		
Russia	Kazan	Consulate-General		
Russia	Khabarovsk	Consulate-General		
Russia	Saint Petersburg	Consulate-General		
Russia	Vladivostok	Consulate-General		
Russia	Yekaterinburg	Consulate-General		
Serbia	Belgrade	Embassy		
Slovakia	Bratislava	Embassy		
Slovenia	Ljubljana	Embassy		
Spain	Madrid	Embassy	Country: Andorra	
Spain	Barcelona	Consulate-General	Country: Andorra	
Sweden	Stockholm	Embassy		
Sweden	Gothenburg	Consulate-General		
Switzerland	Bern	Embassy	Country: Liechtenstein	
Switzerland	Zürich (Note: Originally established in Geneva, the consulate-general was transferred to Alexandria in 1988.)	Consulate-General	Country: Liechtenstein	
Ukraine	Kyiv	Embassy		
United Kingdom	London	Embassy		
United Kingdom	Belfast	Consulate-General		
United Kingdom	Edinburgh	Consulate-General		
United Kingdom	Manchester	Consulate-General		

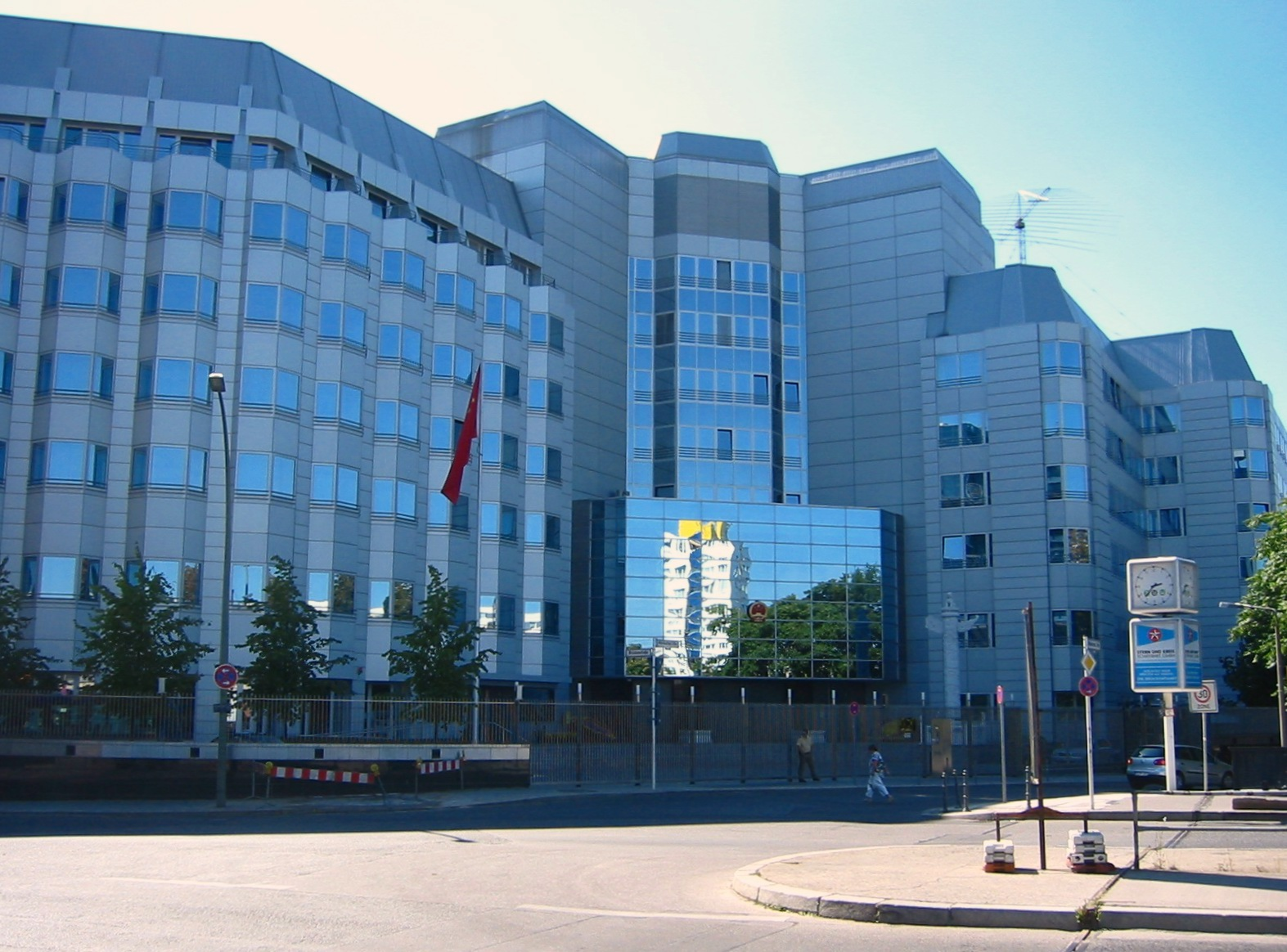
Embassy in Berlin

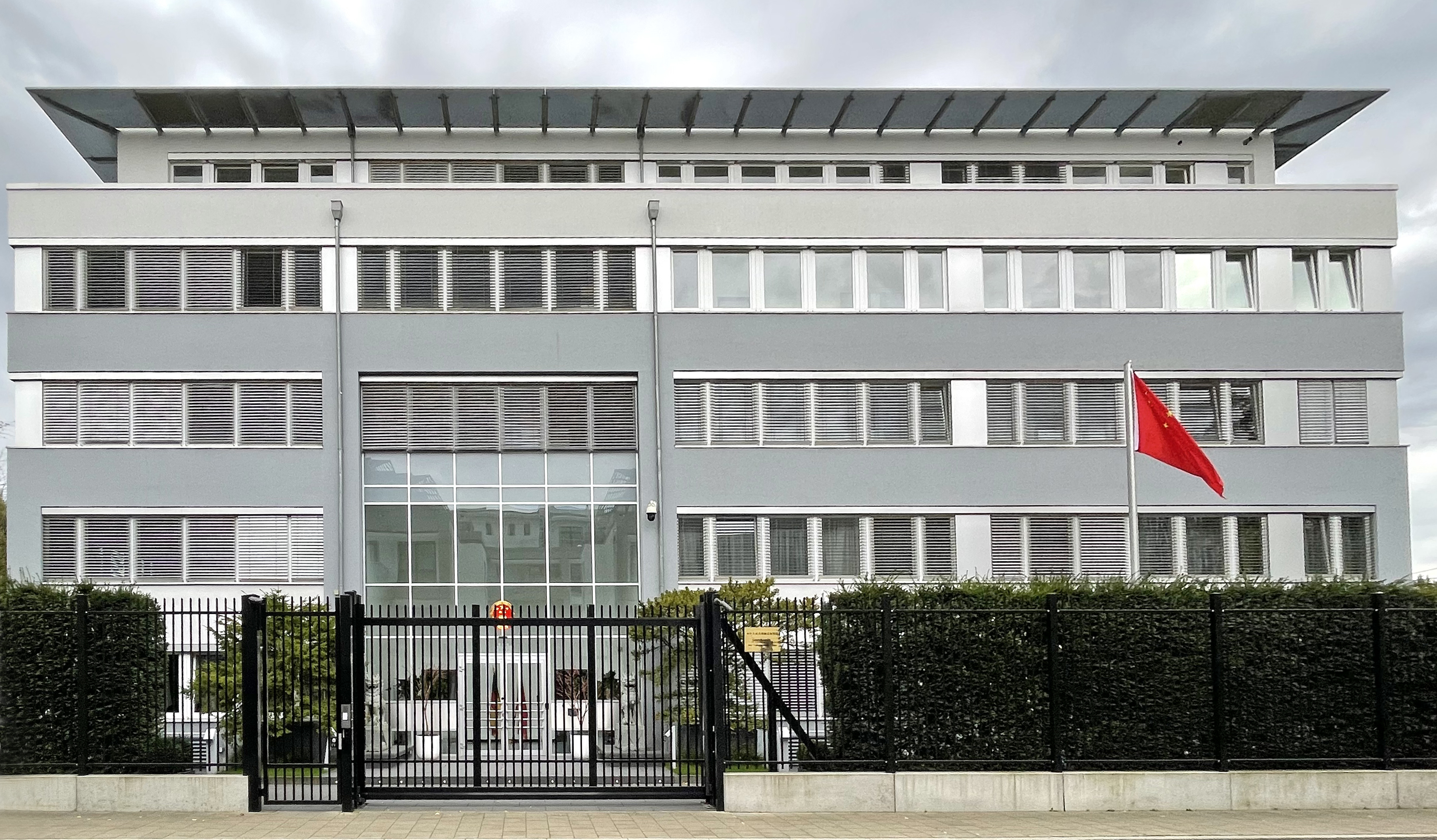
Consulate General in Düsseldorf

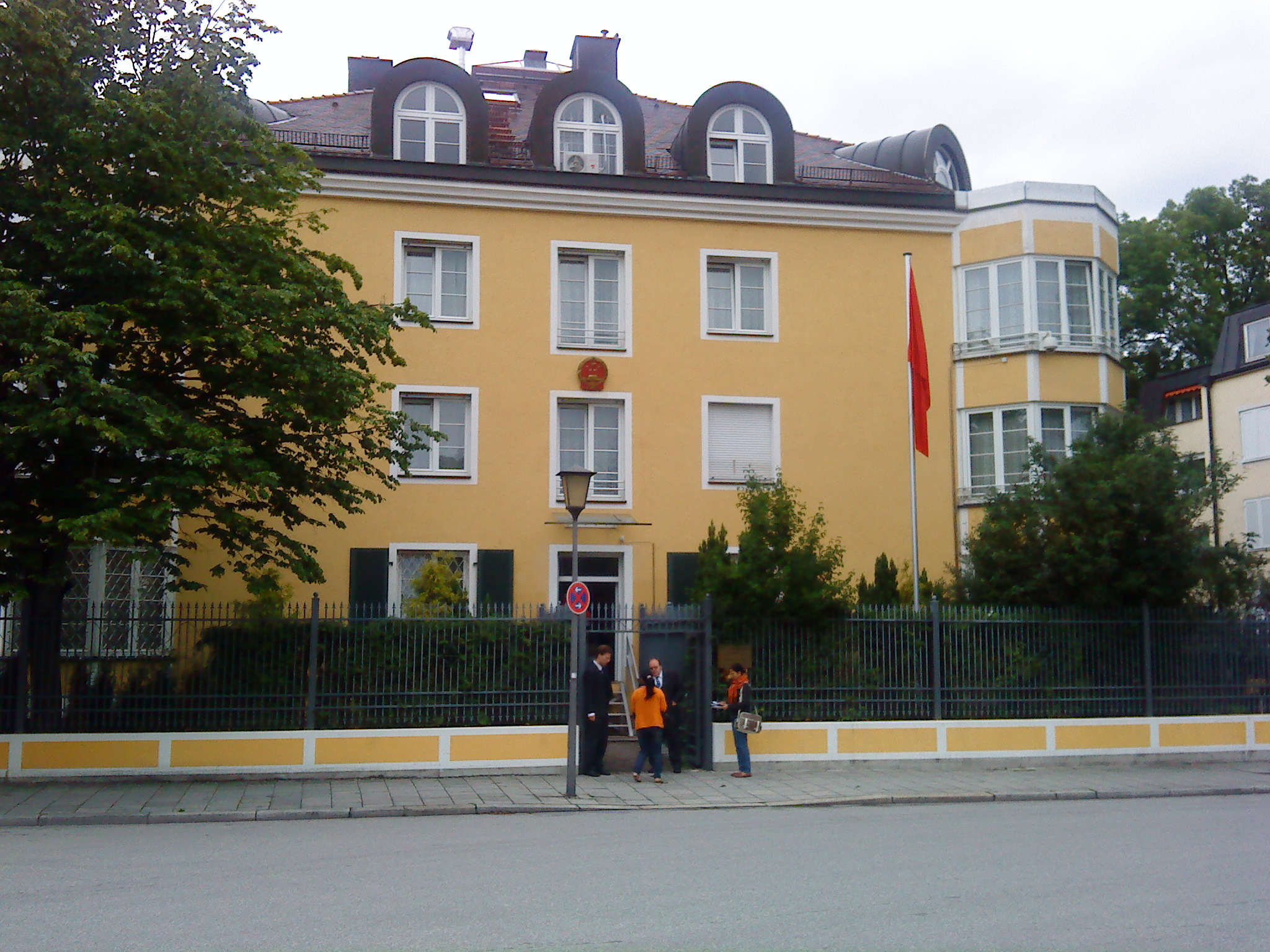
Consulate General in Munich

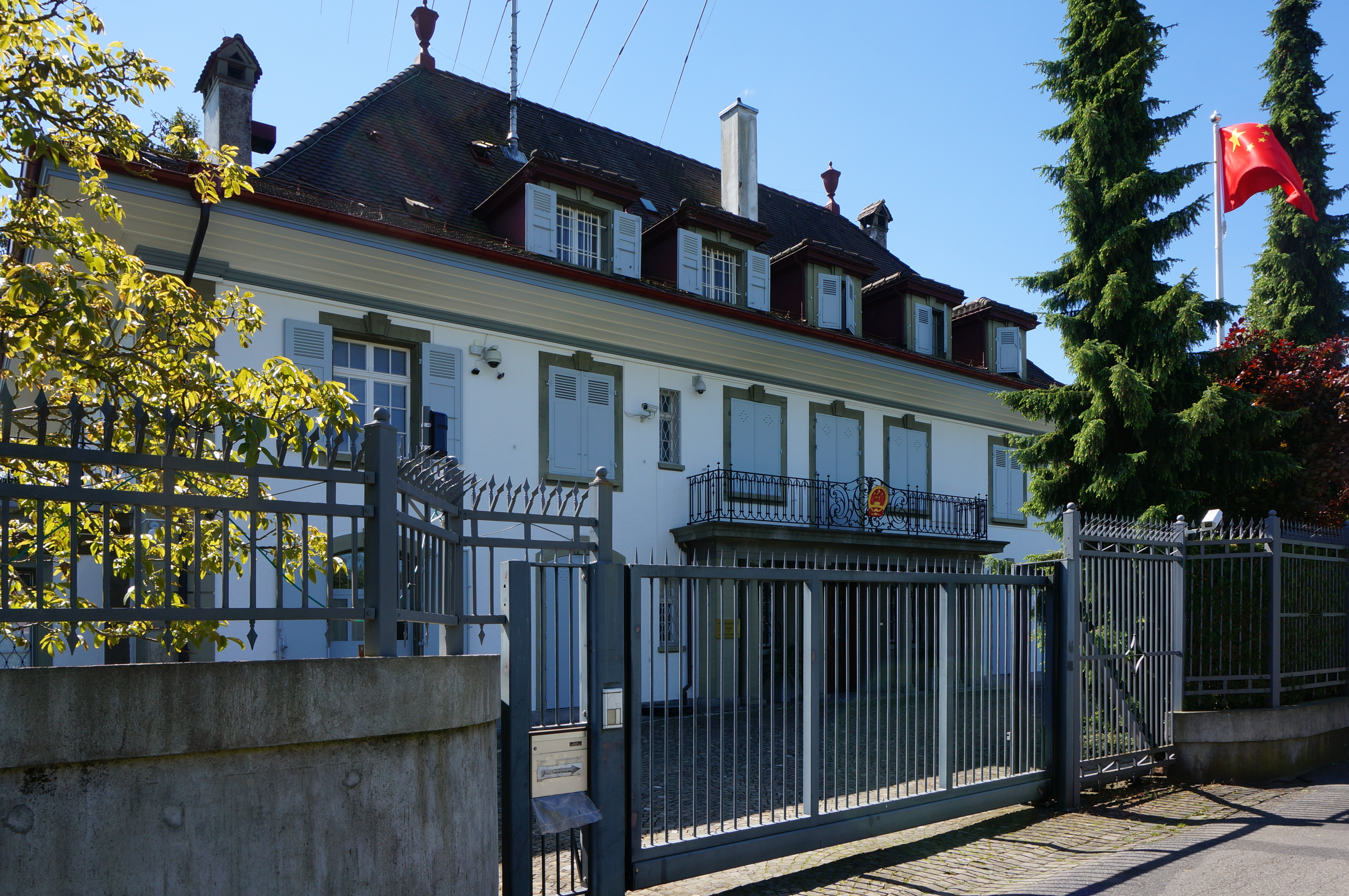
Embassy in Bern

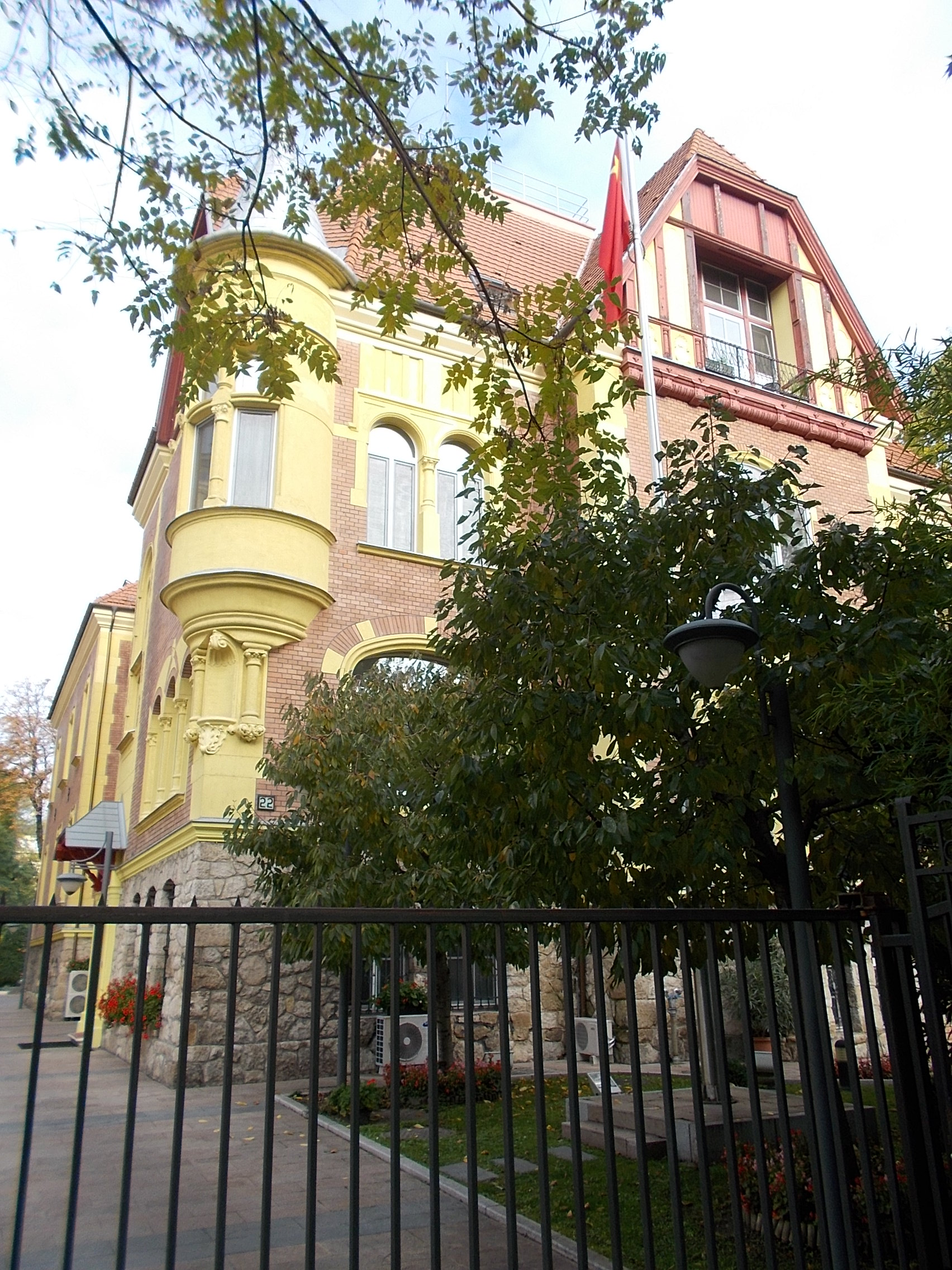
Embassy in Budapest

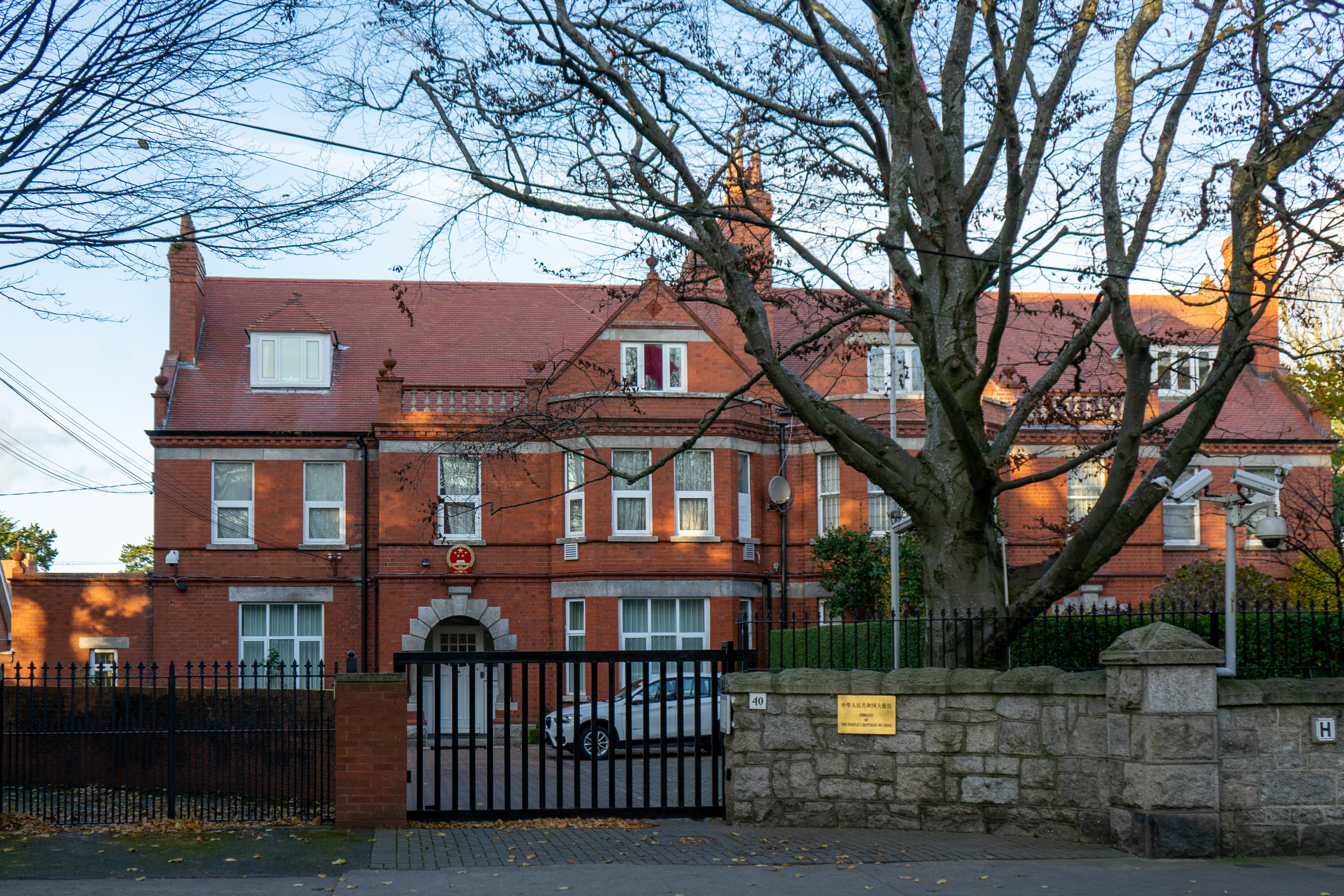
Embassy in Dublin

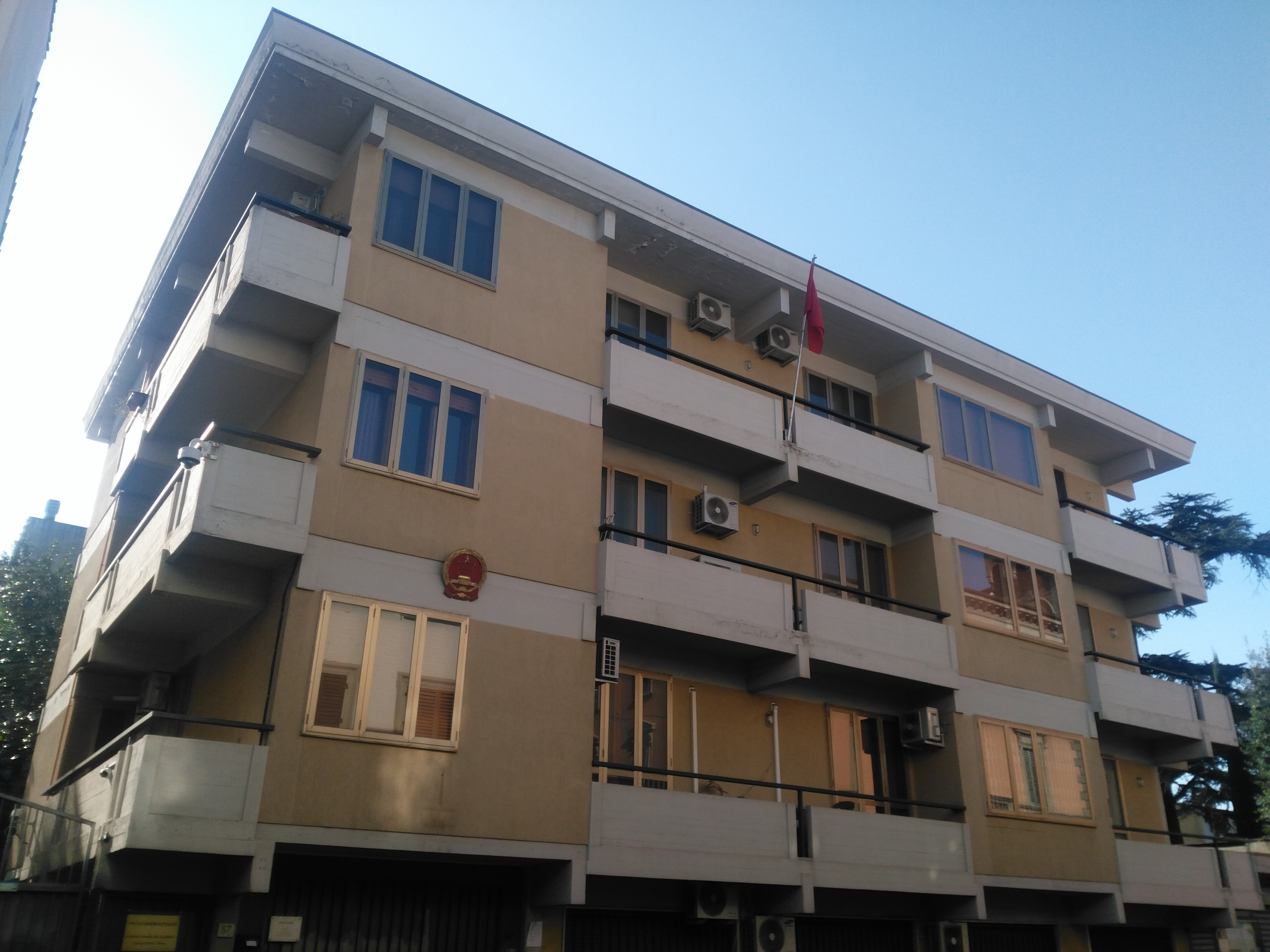
Consulate-General in Florence

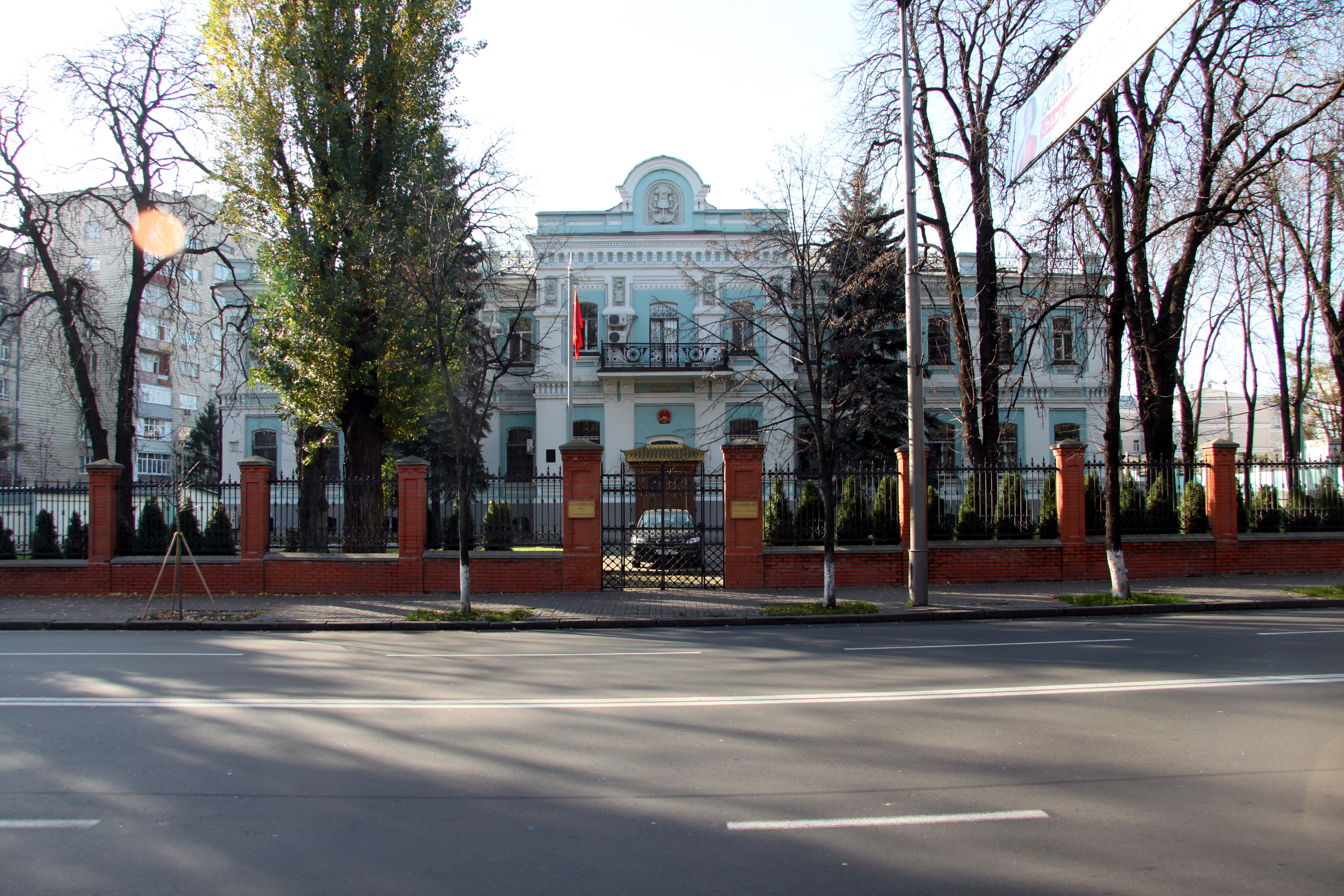
Embassy in Kyiv

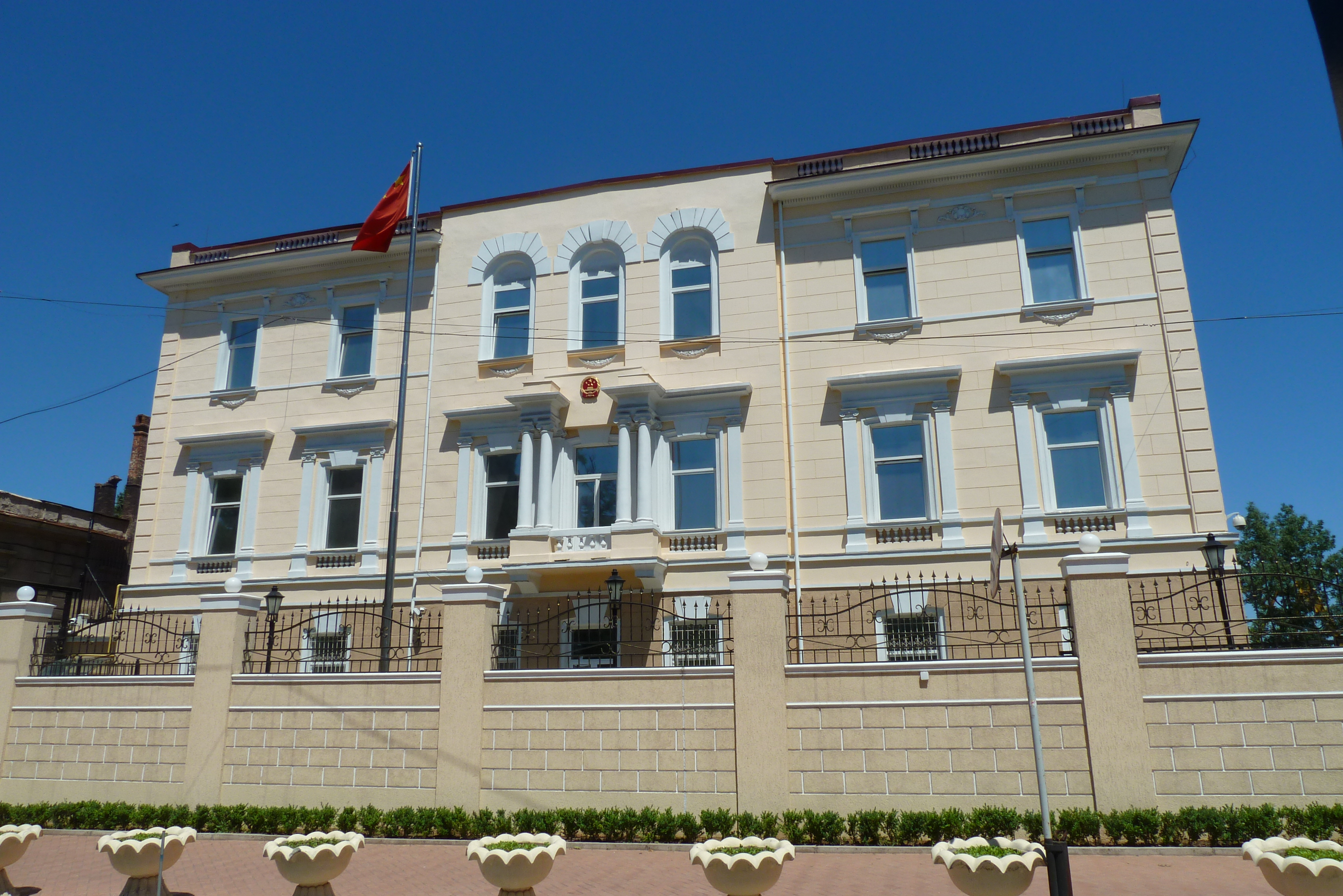
Consulate General in Odesa

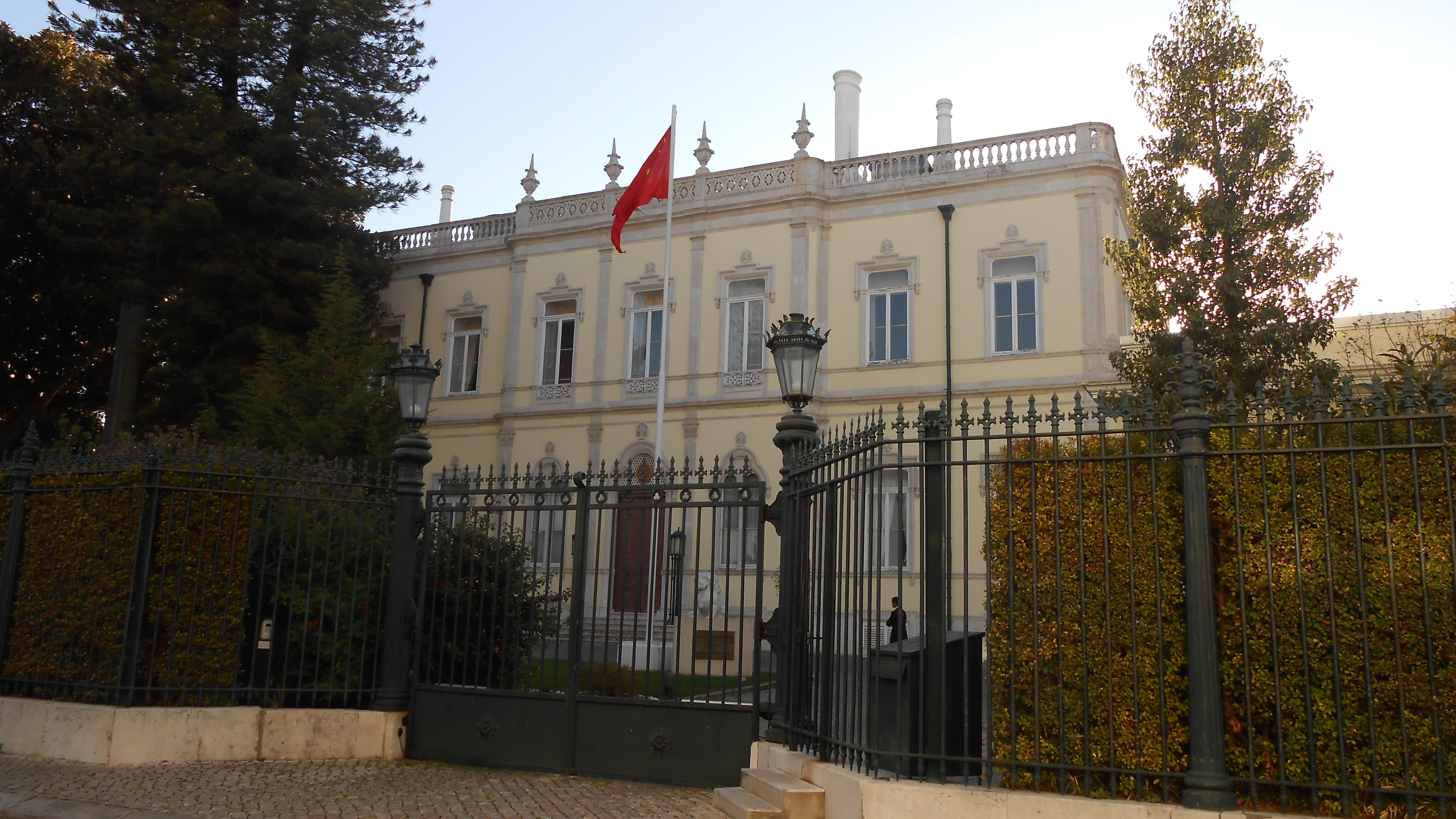
Embassy in Lisbon

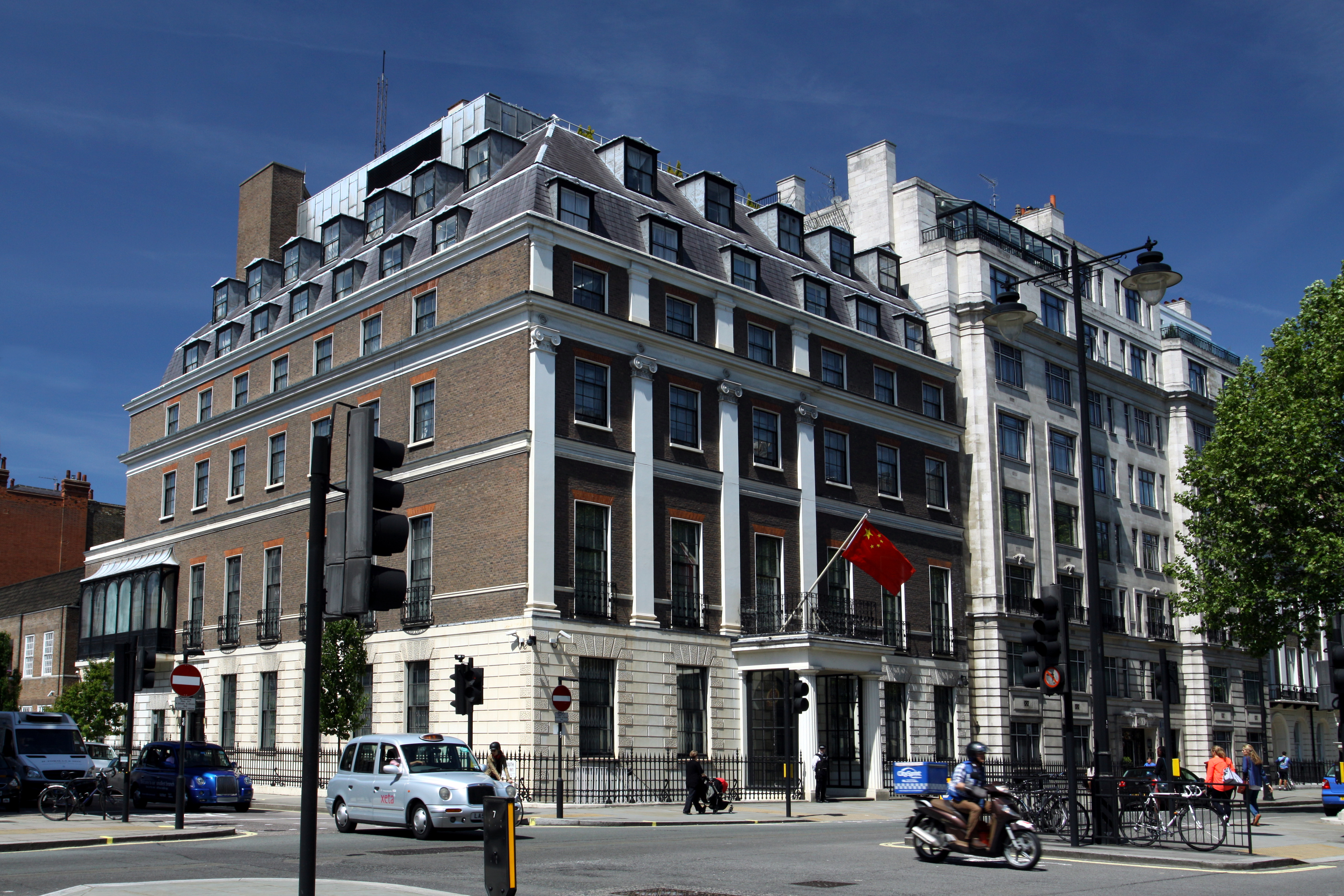
Embassy in London

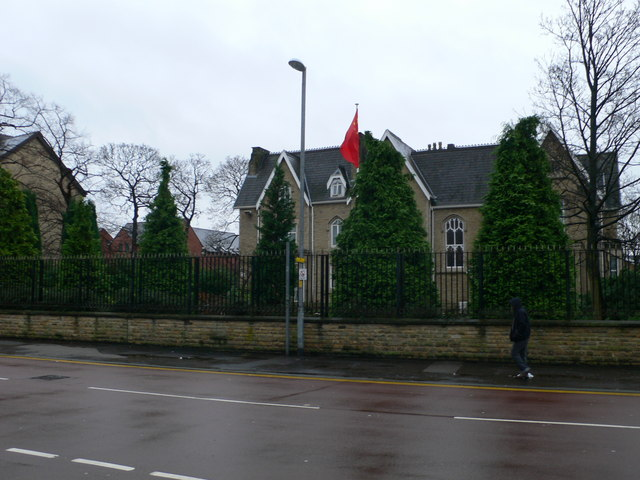
Consulate-General in Manchester

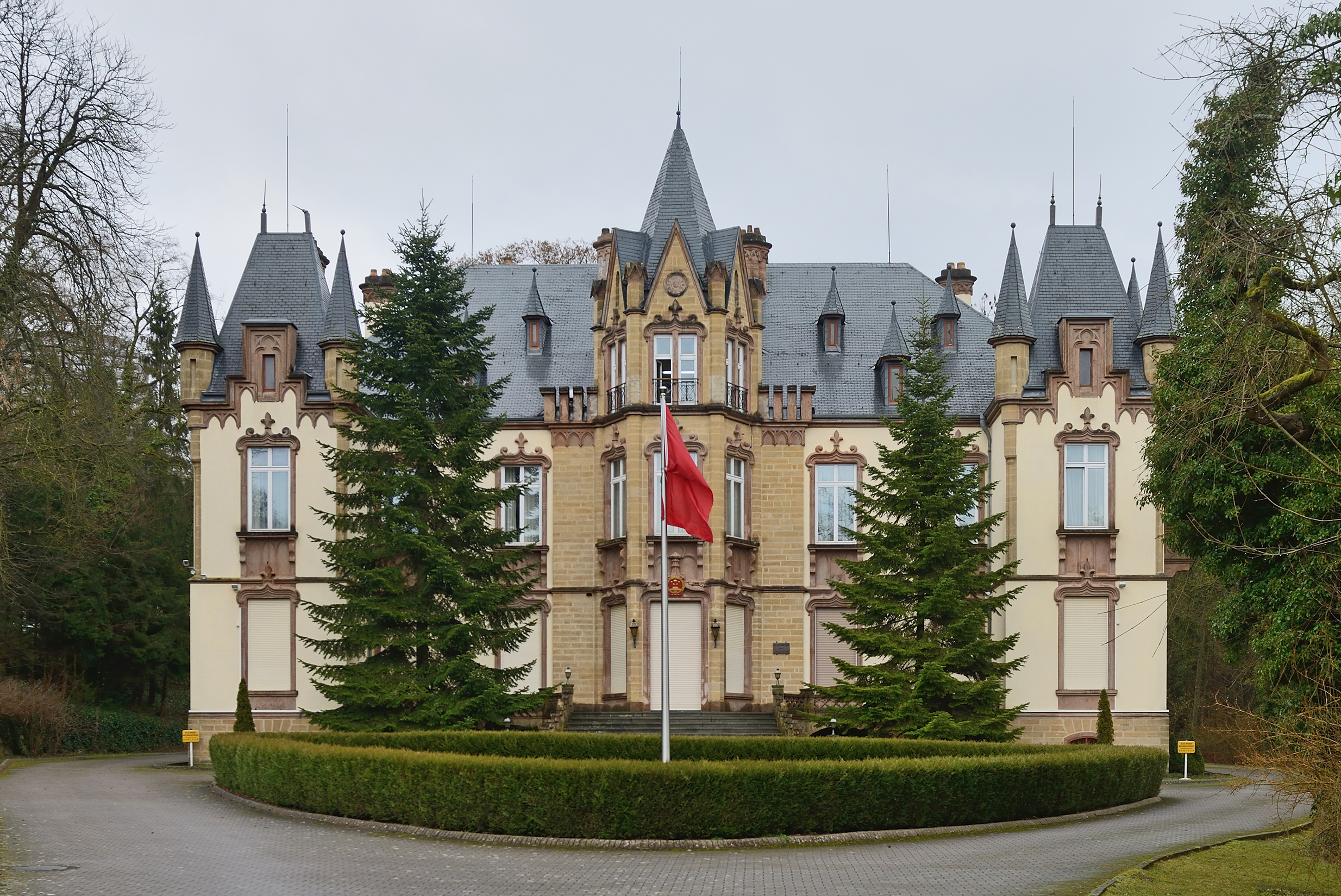
Embassy in Luxembourg City

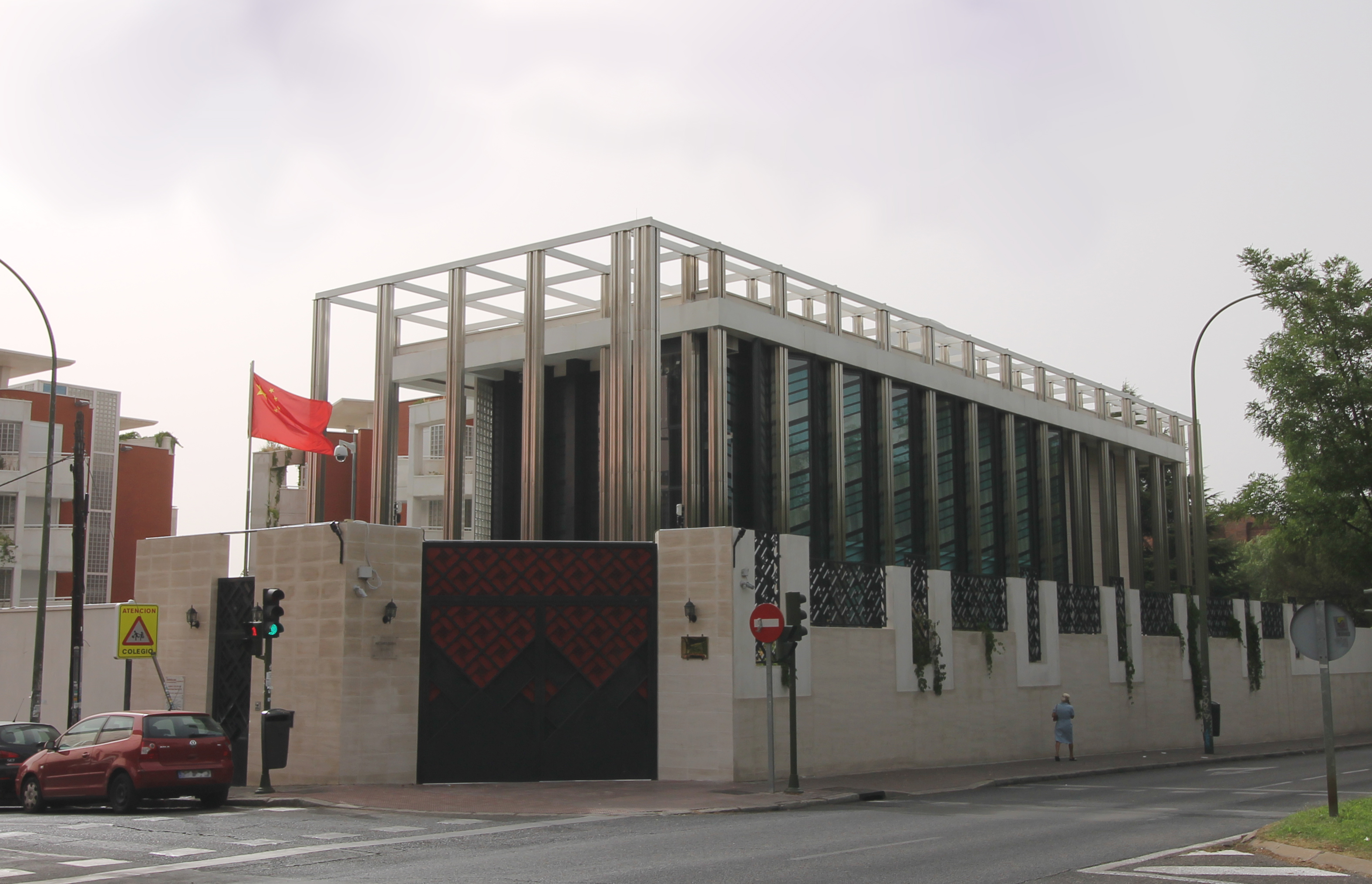
Embassy in Madrid

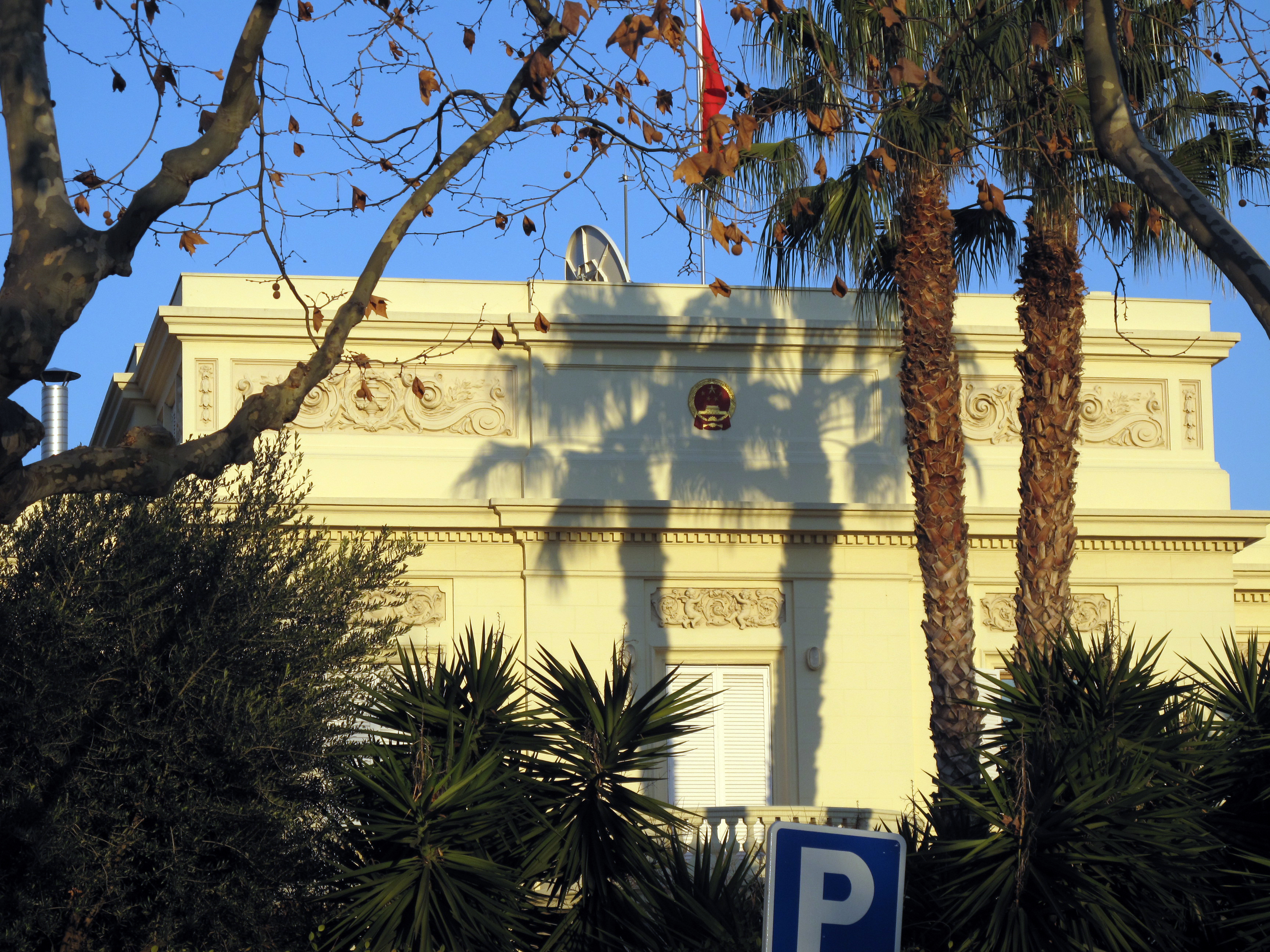
Consulate General in Barcelona

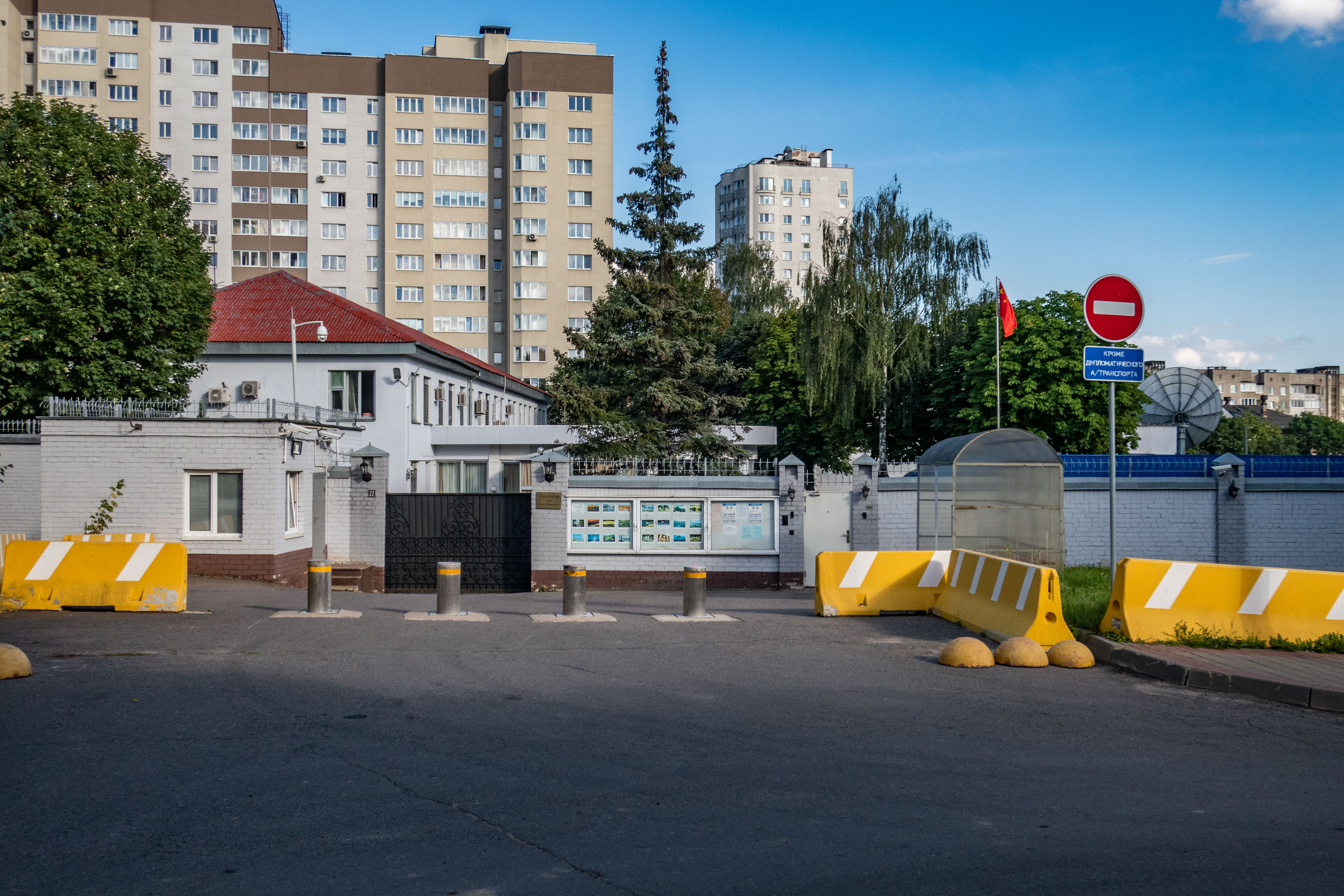
Embassy in Minsk

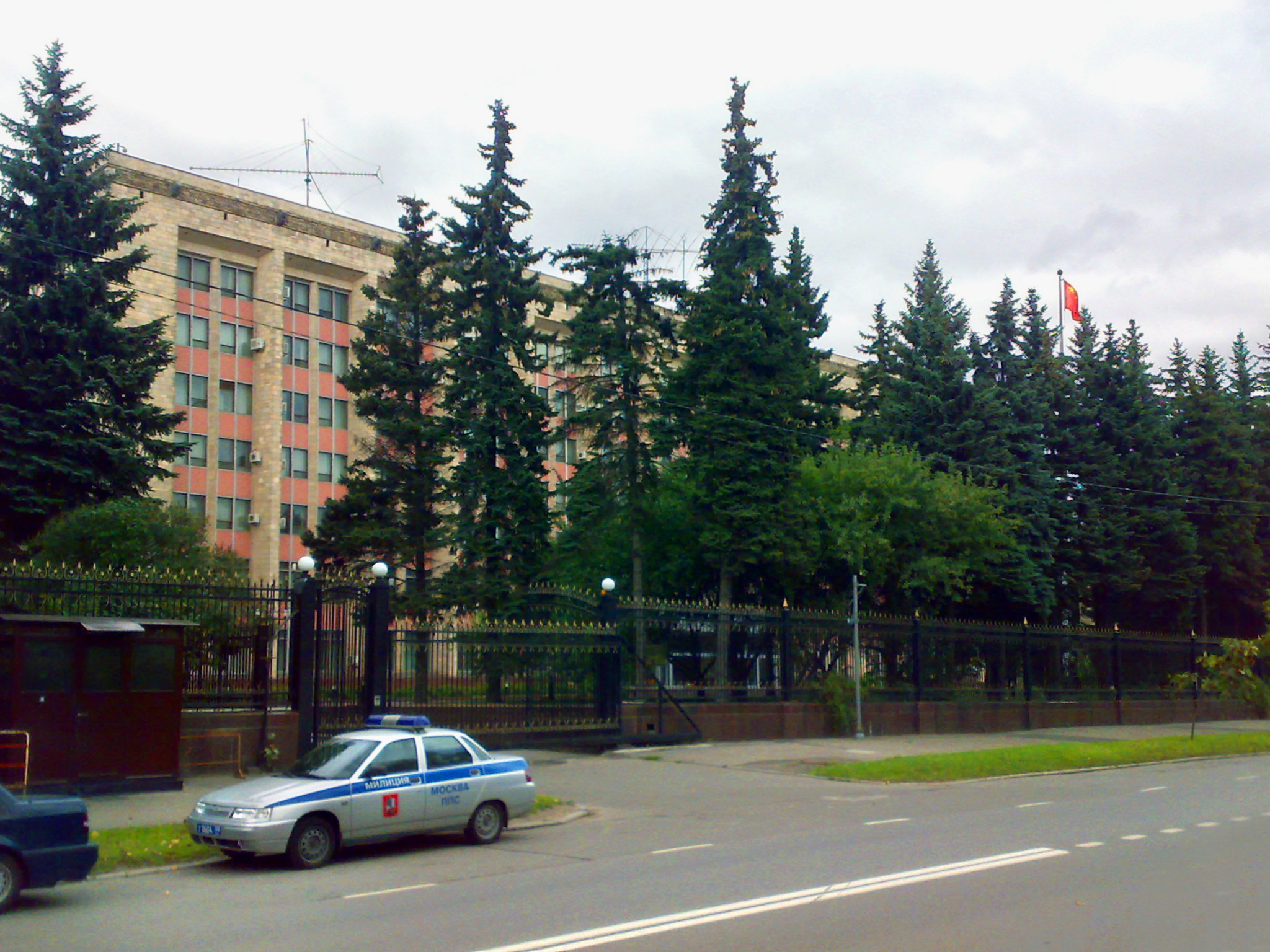
Embassy in Moscow

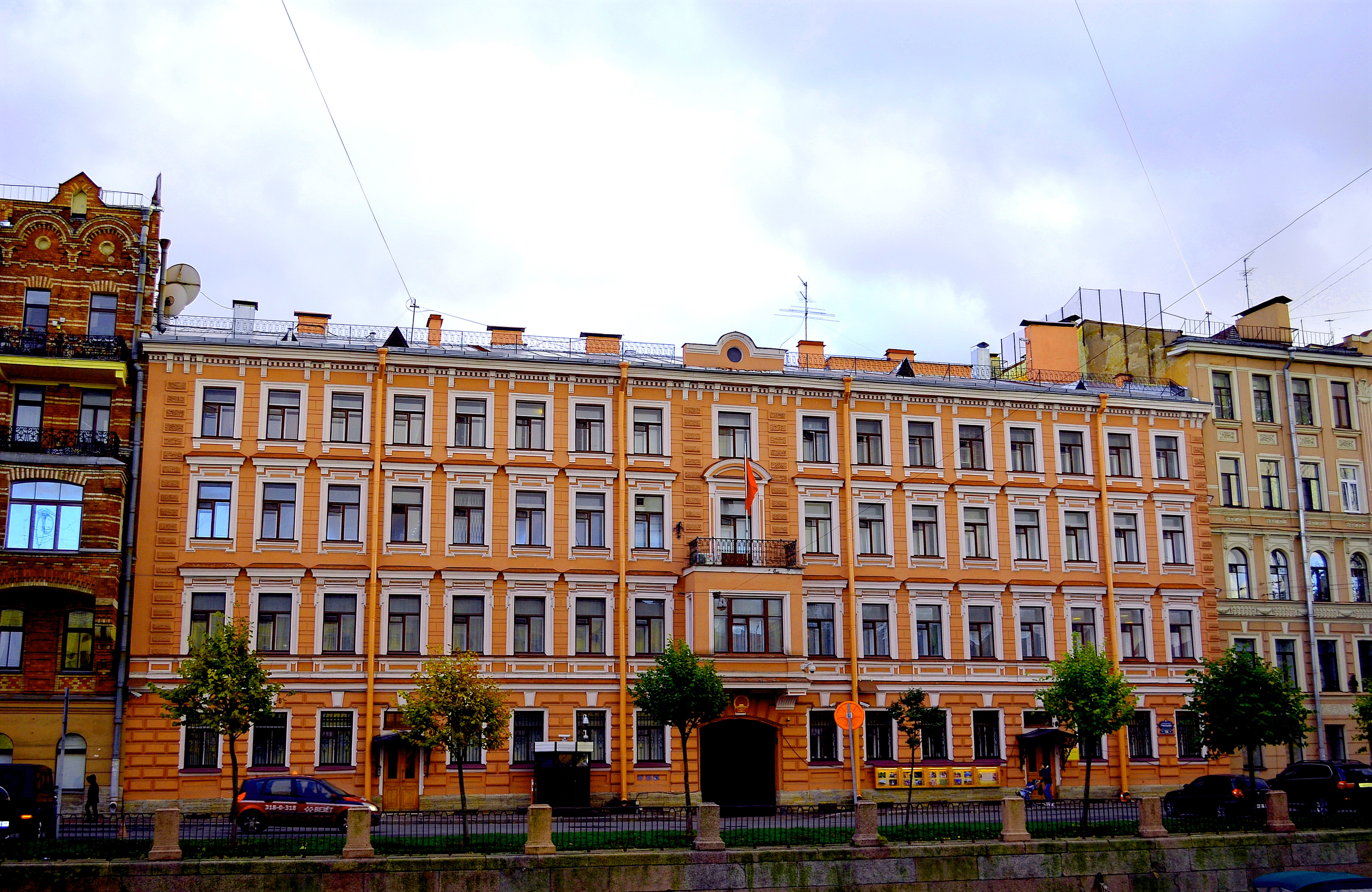
Consulate General in Saint Petersburg

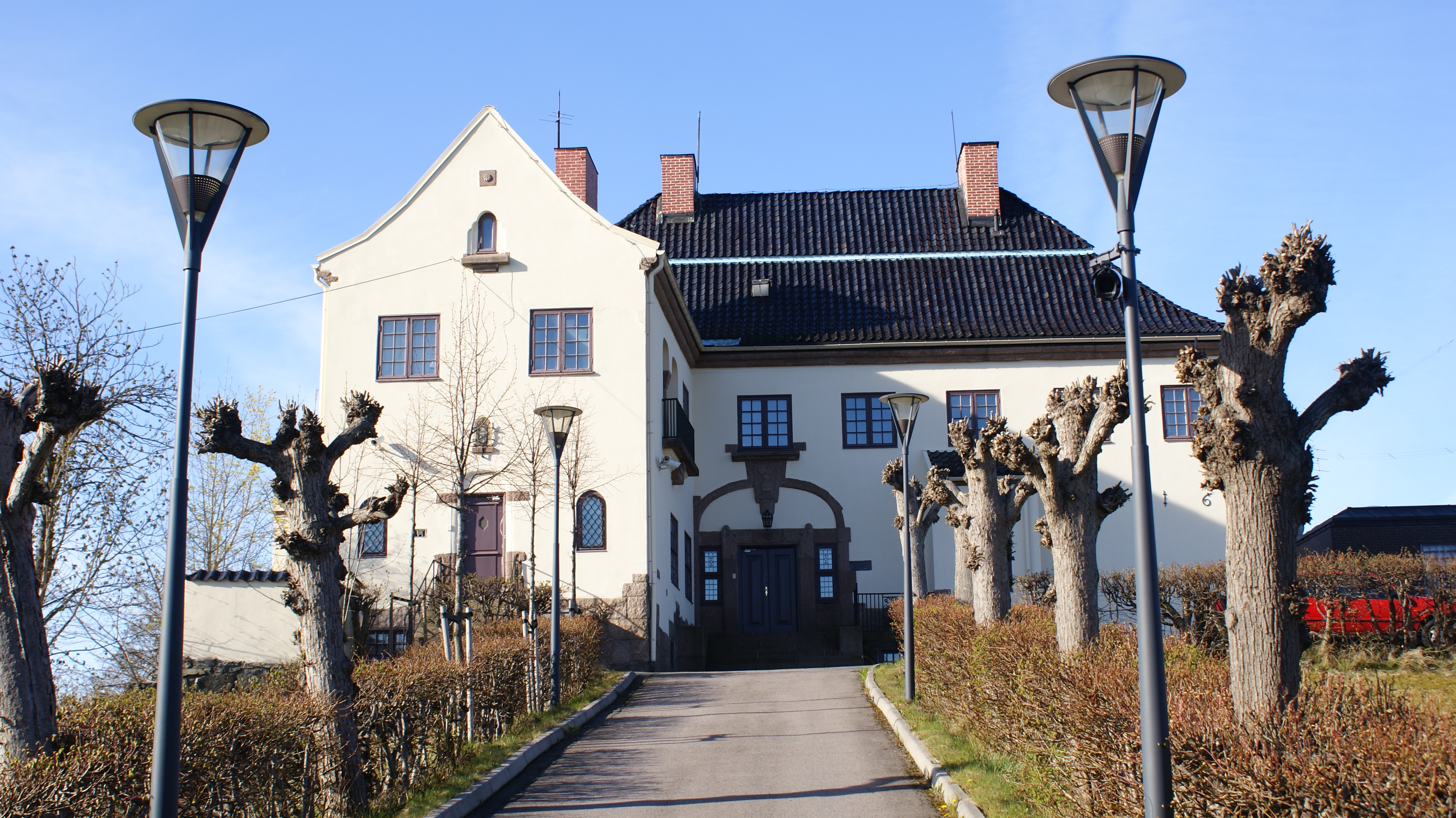
Embassy in Oslo

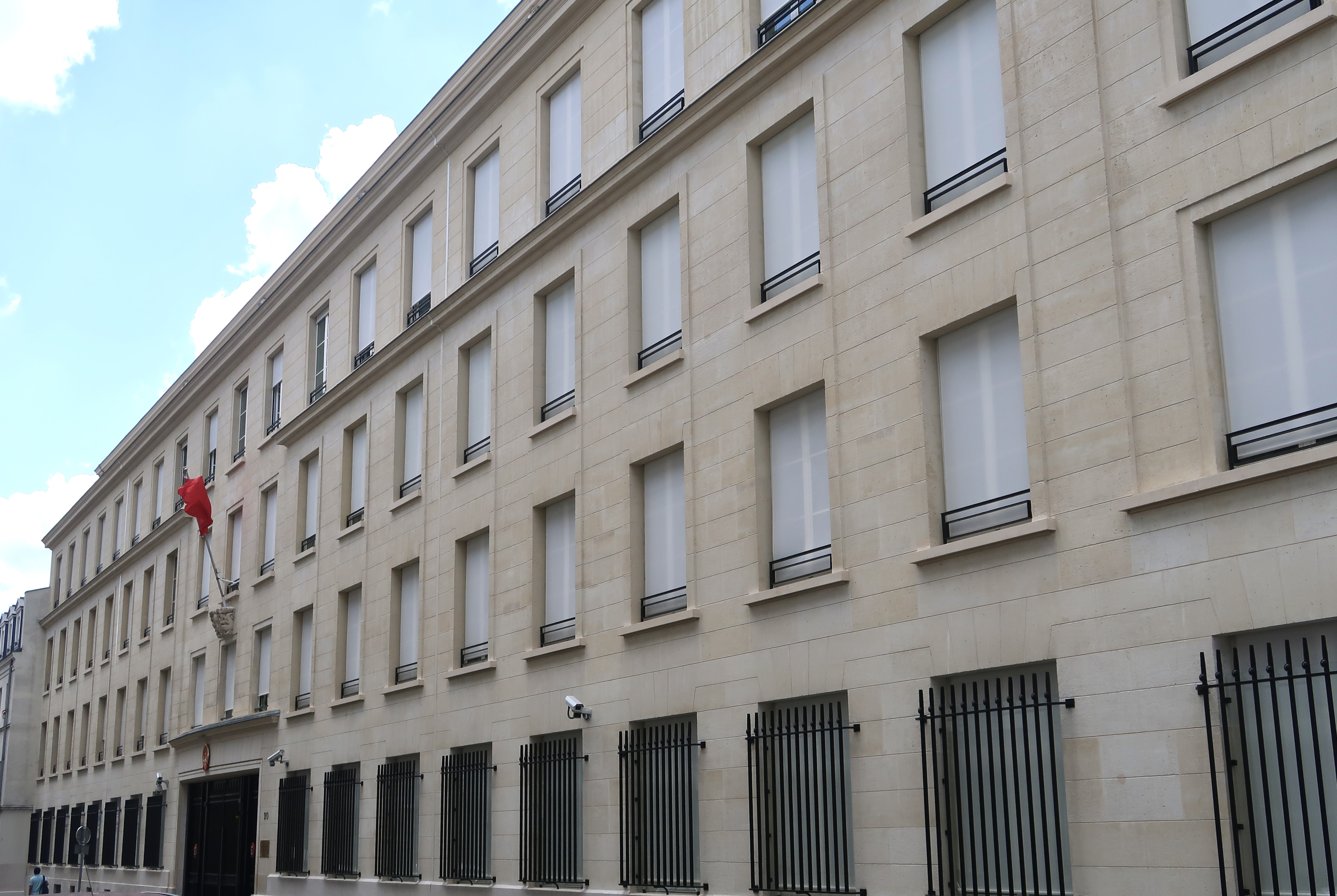
Embassy in Paris

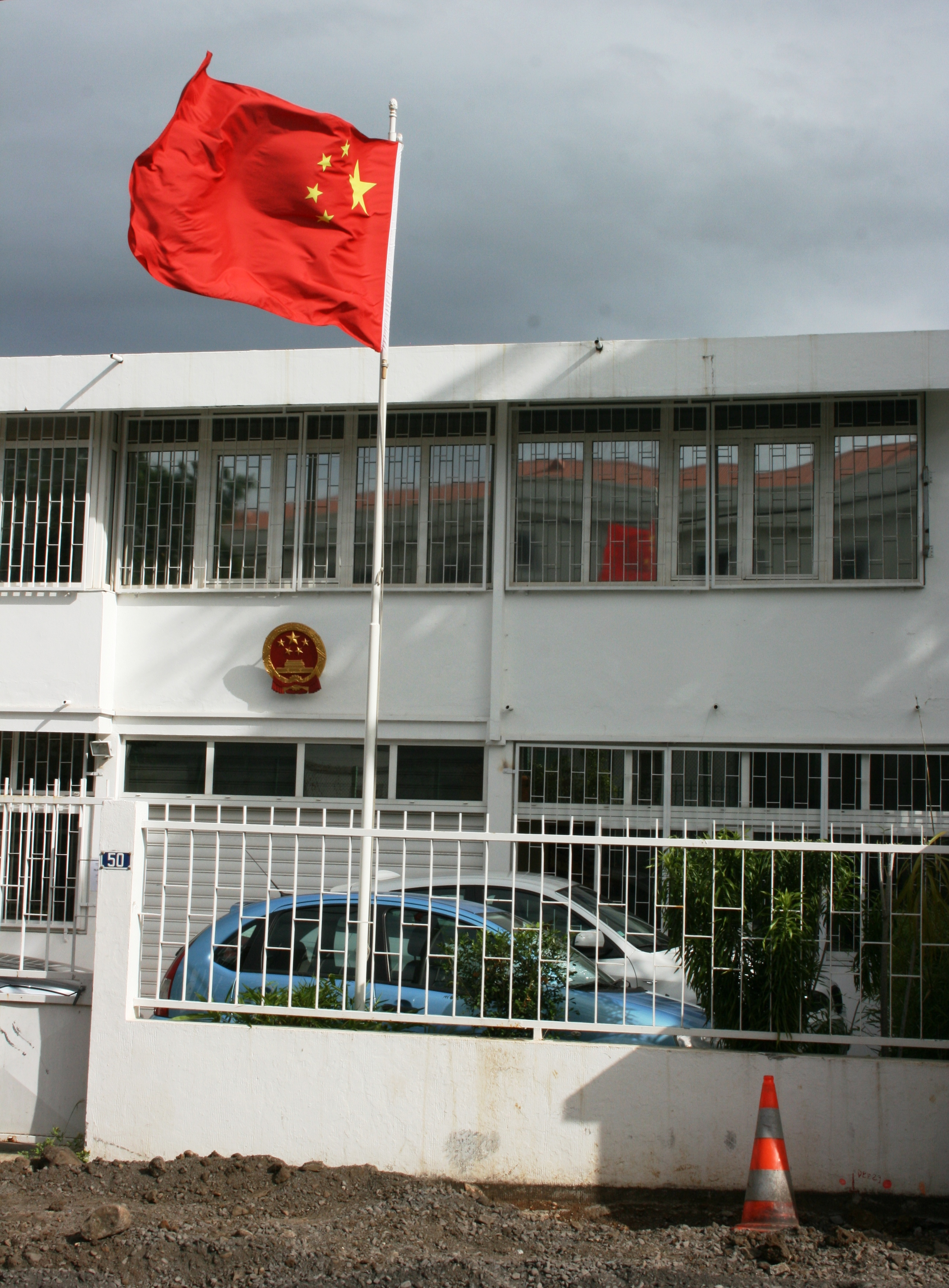
Consulate General in Saint-Denis

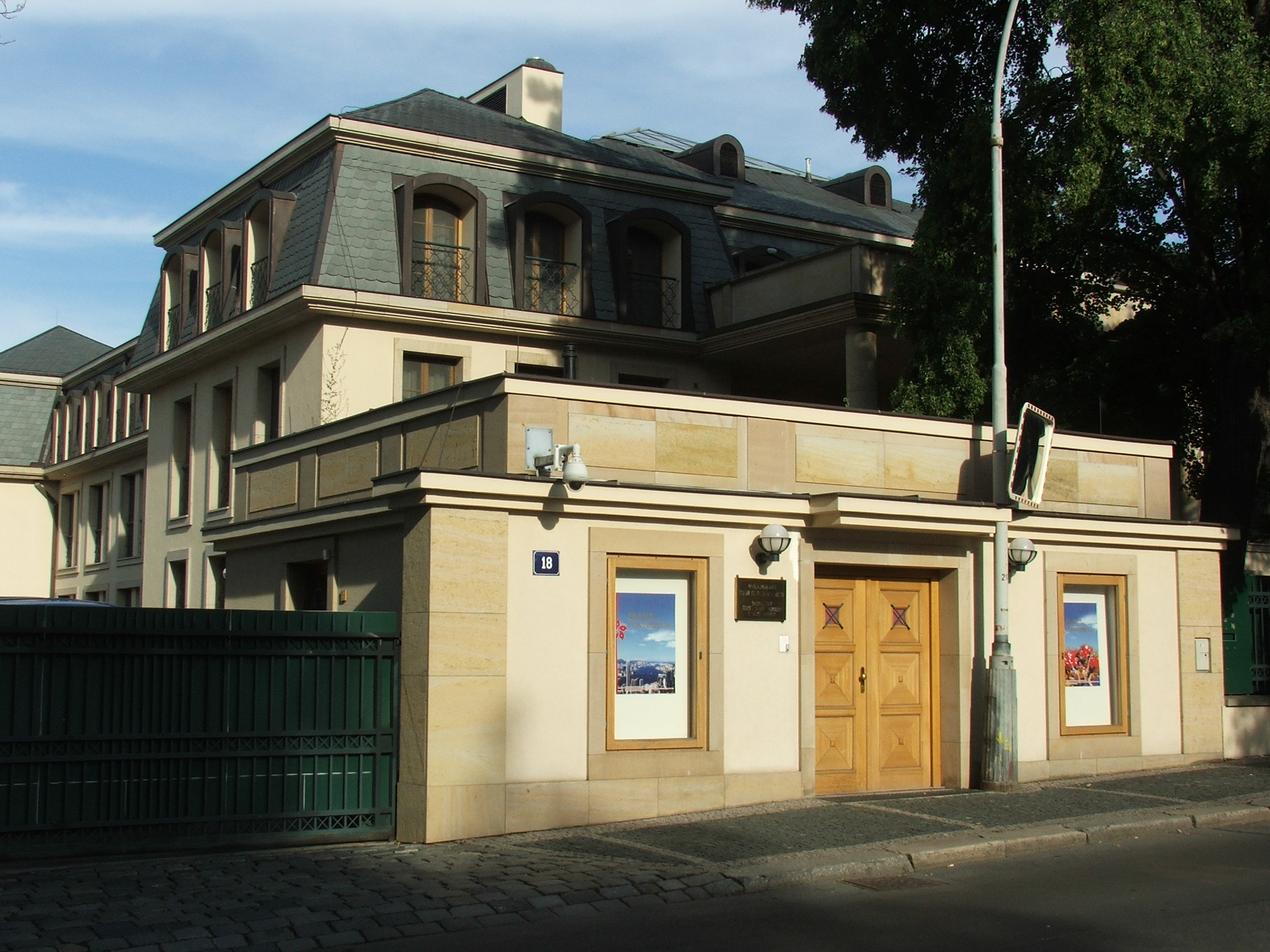
Embassy in Prague

Embassy in Reykjavík

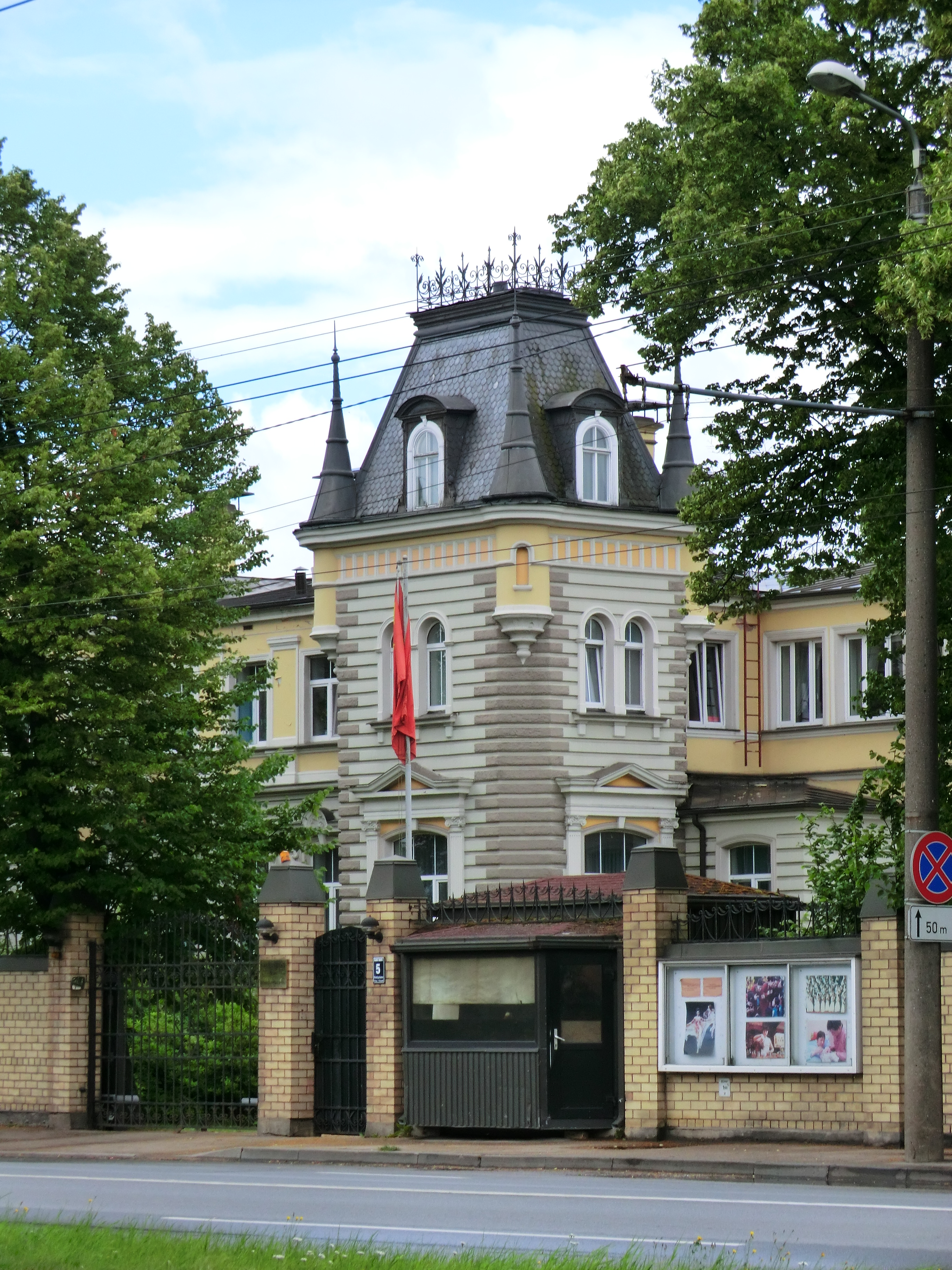
Embassy in Riga

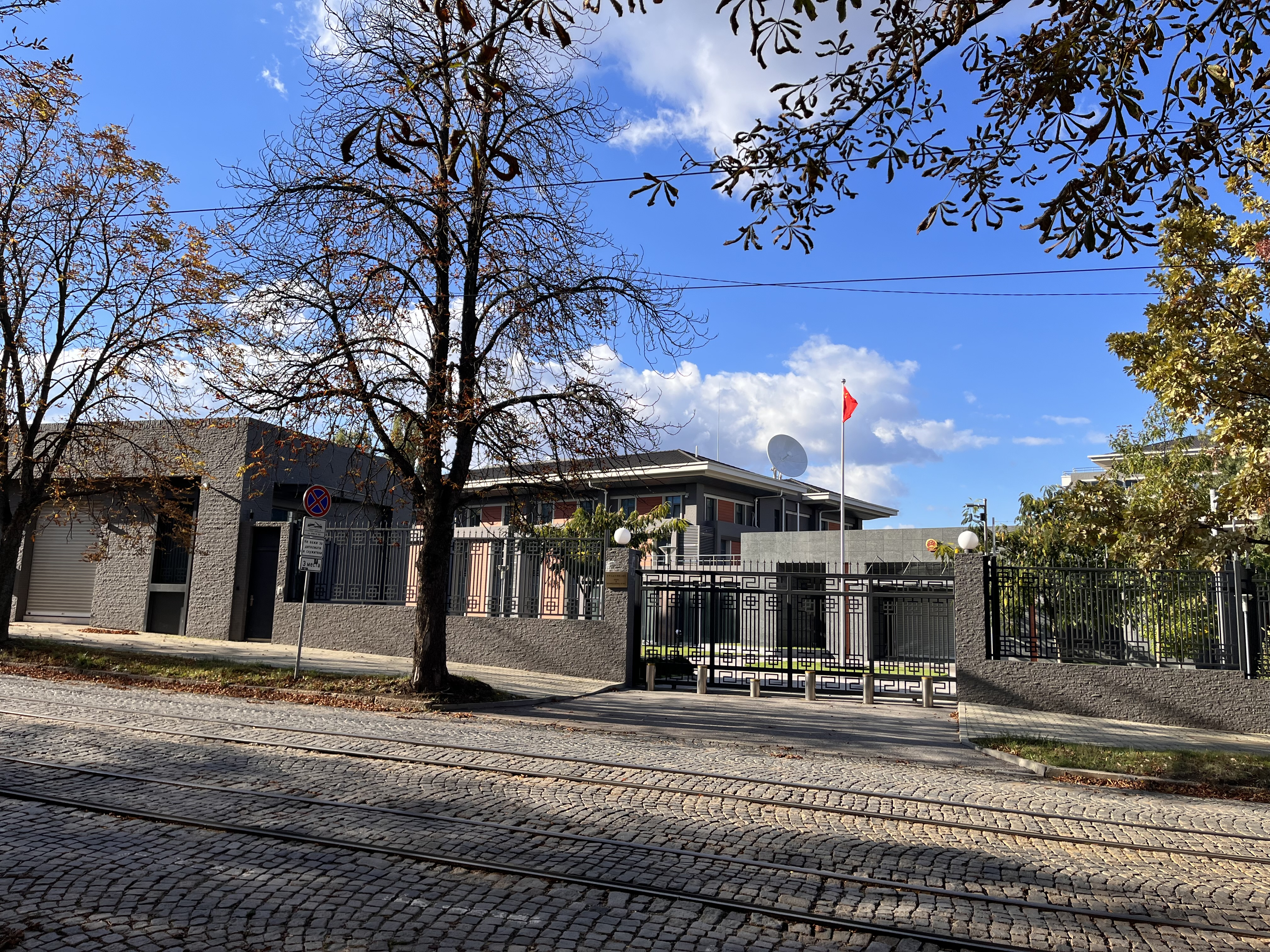
Embassy in Sofia

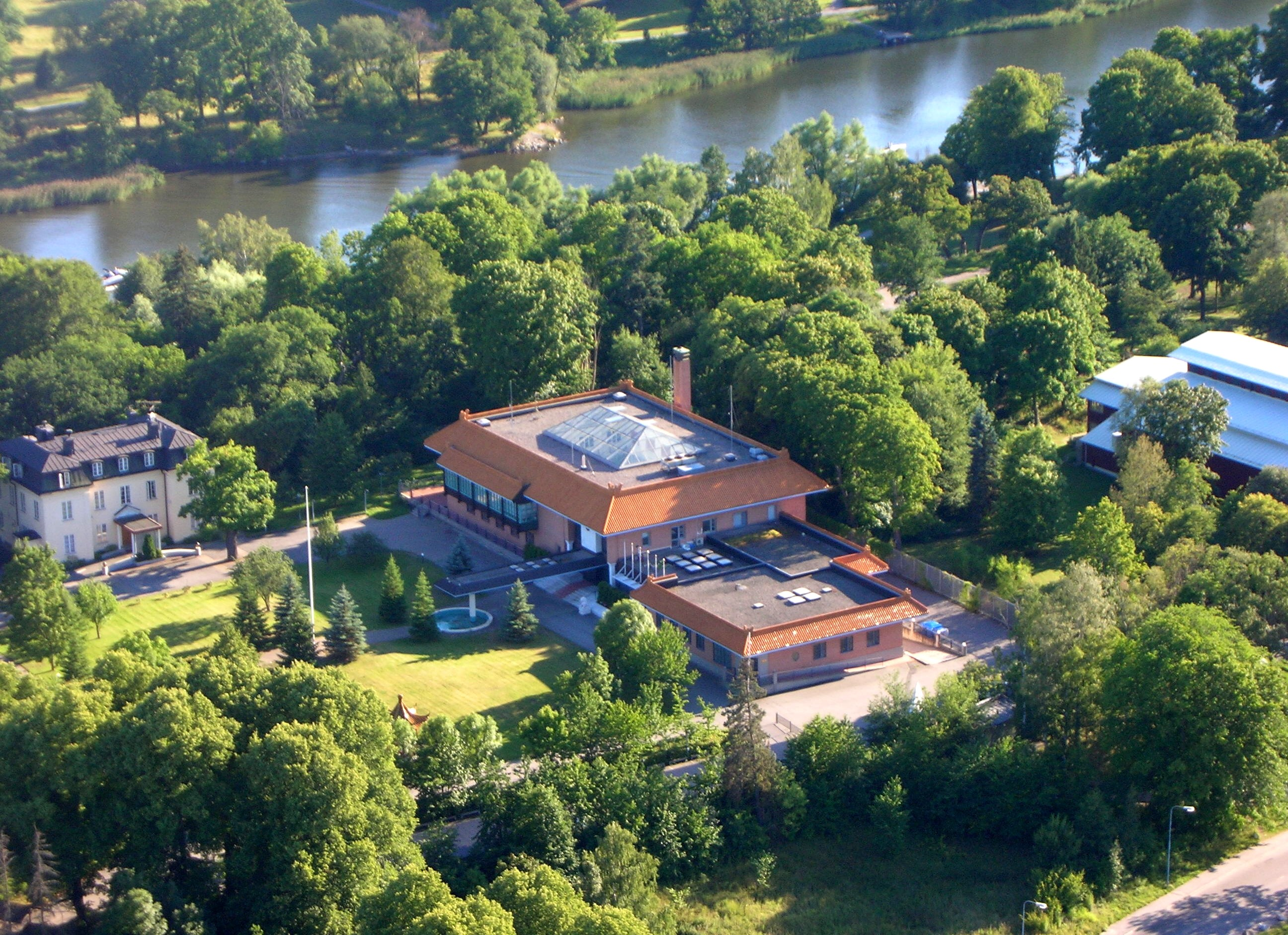
Embassy in Stockholm

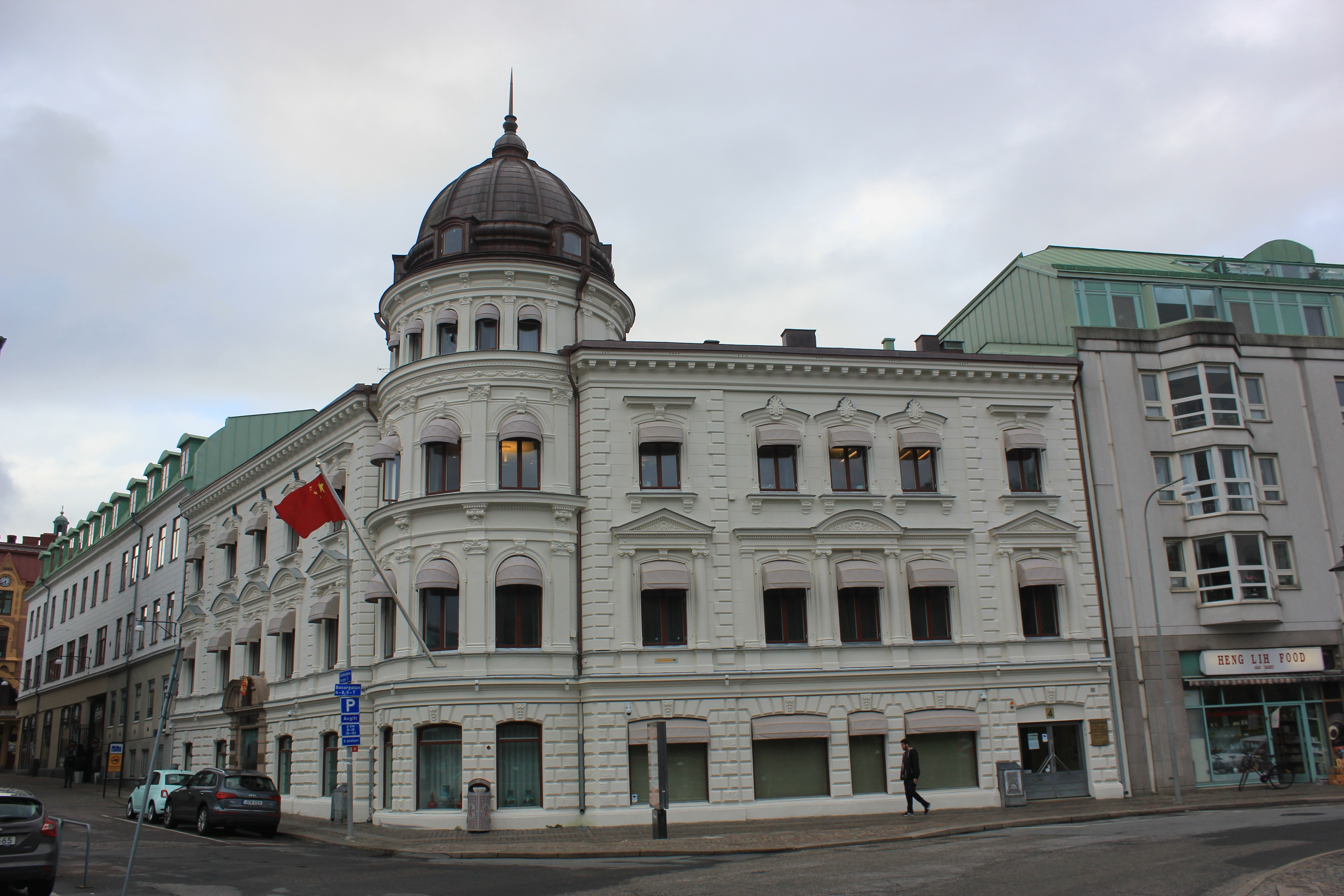
Consulate General in Gothenburg

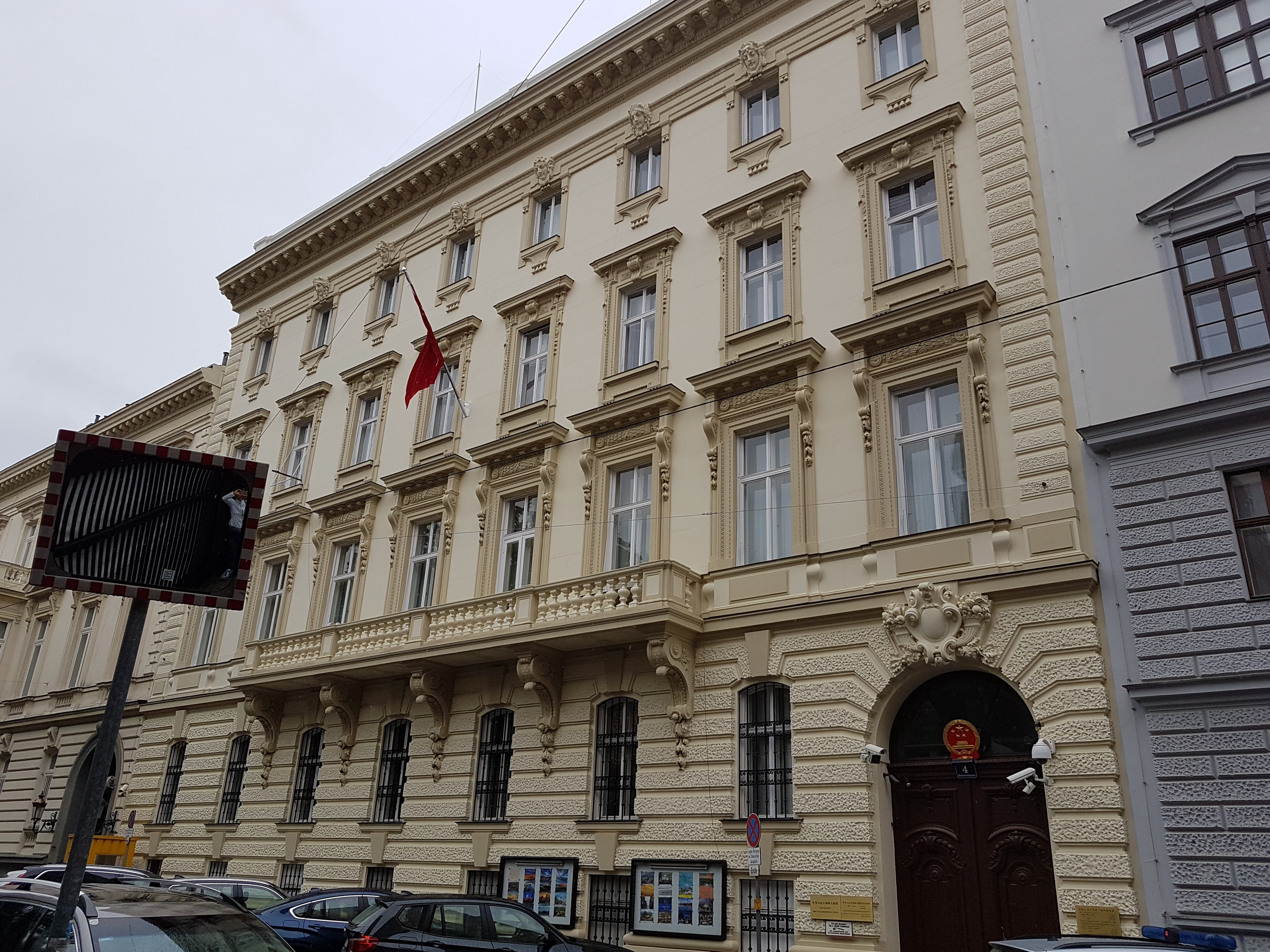
Embassy in Vienna

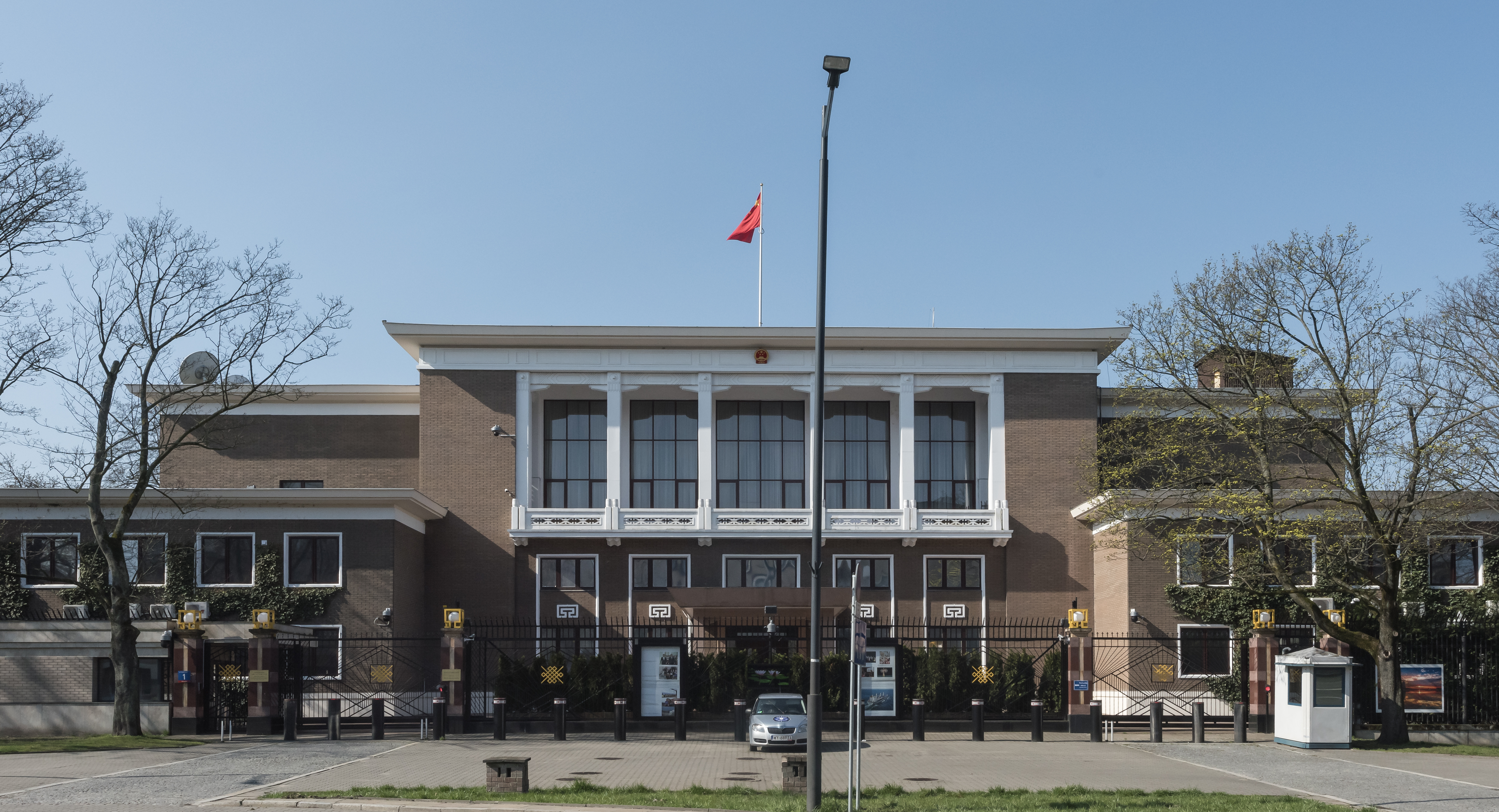
Embassy in Warsaw

=== Oceania ===
Host country	Host city	Mission	Concurrent accreditation	Ref.
Australia	Canberra	Embassy		
Australia	Adelaide	Consulate-General		
Australia	Brisbane	Consulate-General		
Australia	Melbourne	Consulate-General		
Australia	Perth	Consulate-General		
Australia	Sydney	Consulate-General		
Fiji	Suva	Embassy		
Kiribati	Tarawa	Embassy		
Micronesia	Palikir	Embassy		
Nauru	Aiwo	Embassy		
New Zealand	Wellington	Embassy	Countries: Cook Islands; Niue	
New Zealand	Auckland	Consulate-General	Countries: Cook Islands; Niue	
New Zealand	Christchurch	Consulate-General	Countries: Cook Islands; Niue	
Papua New Guinea	Port Moresby	Embassy		
Samoa	Apia	Embassy		
Solomon Islands	Honiara	Embassy		
Tonga	Nuku'alofa	Embassy		
Vanuatu	Port Vila	Embassy		

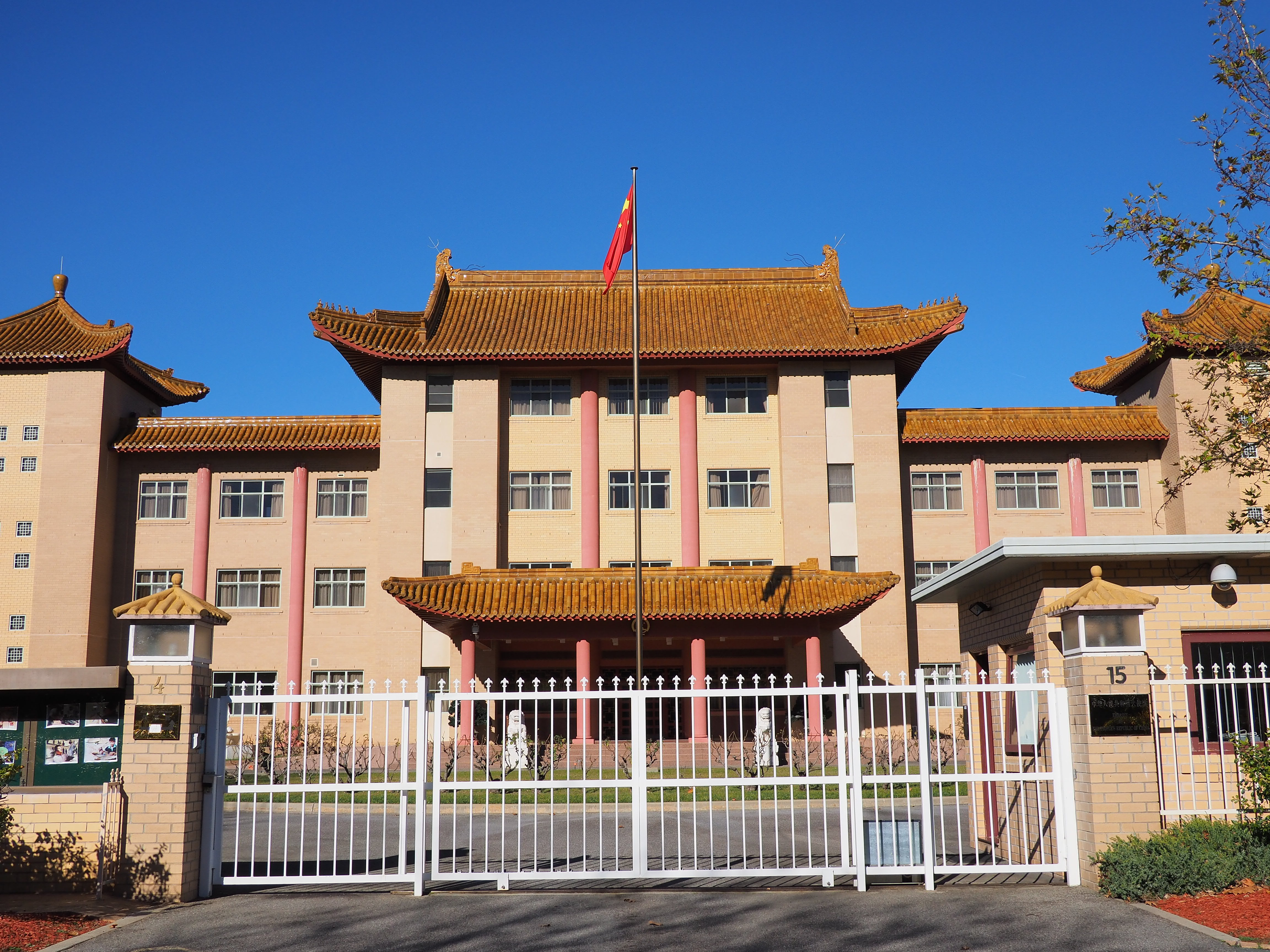
Embassy in Canberra

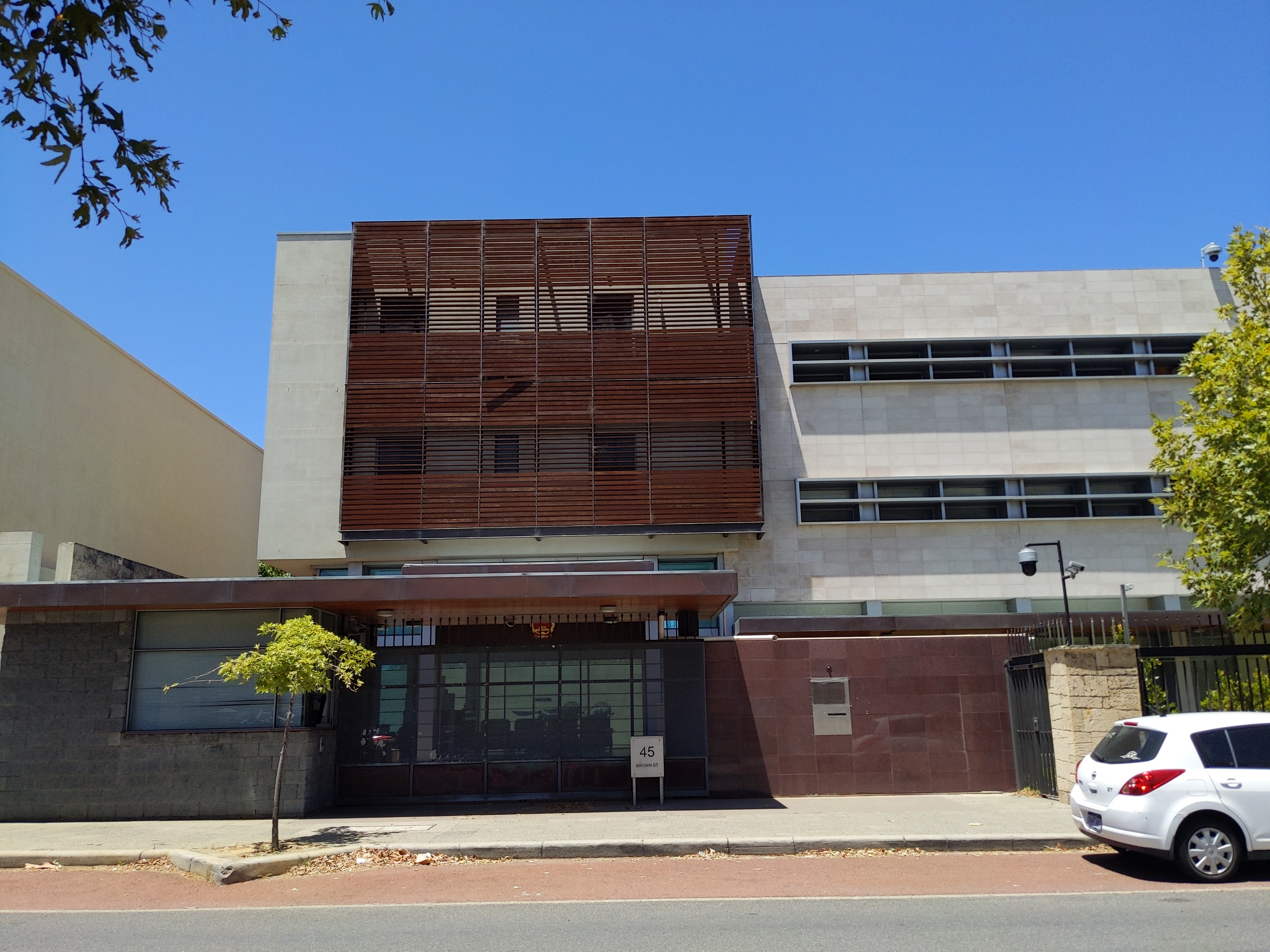
Consulate General in Perth

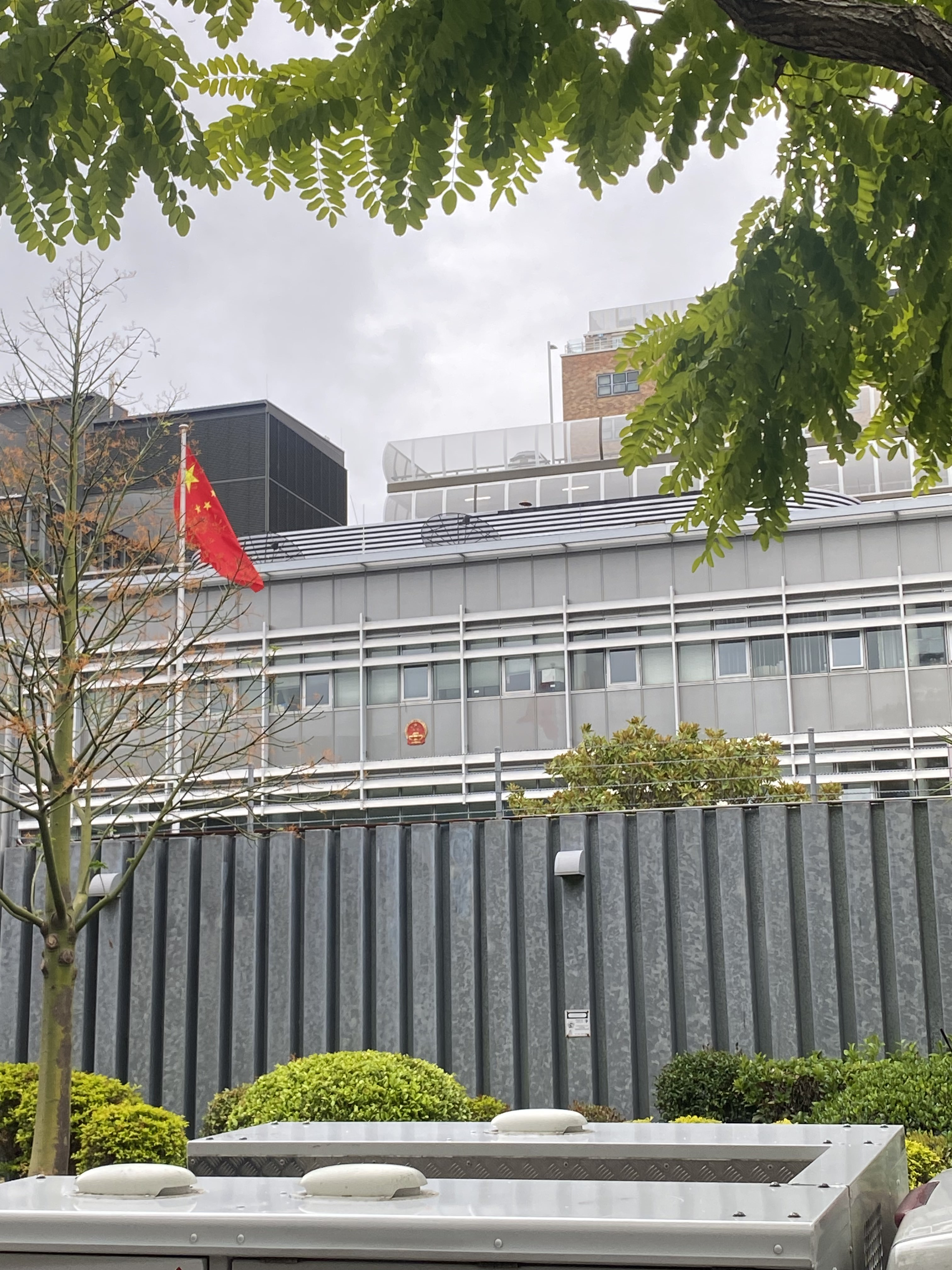
Consulate General in Sydney

Embassy in Nukuʻalofa

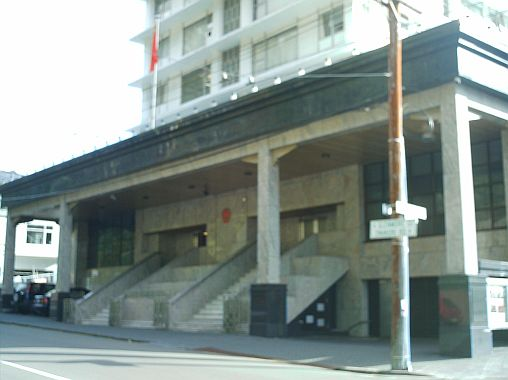
Embassy in Wellington

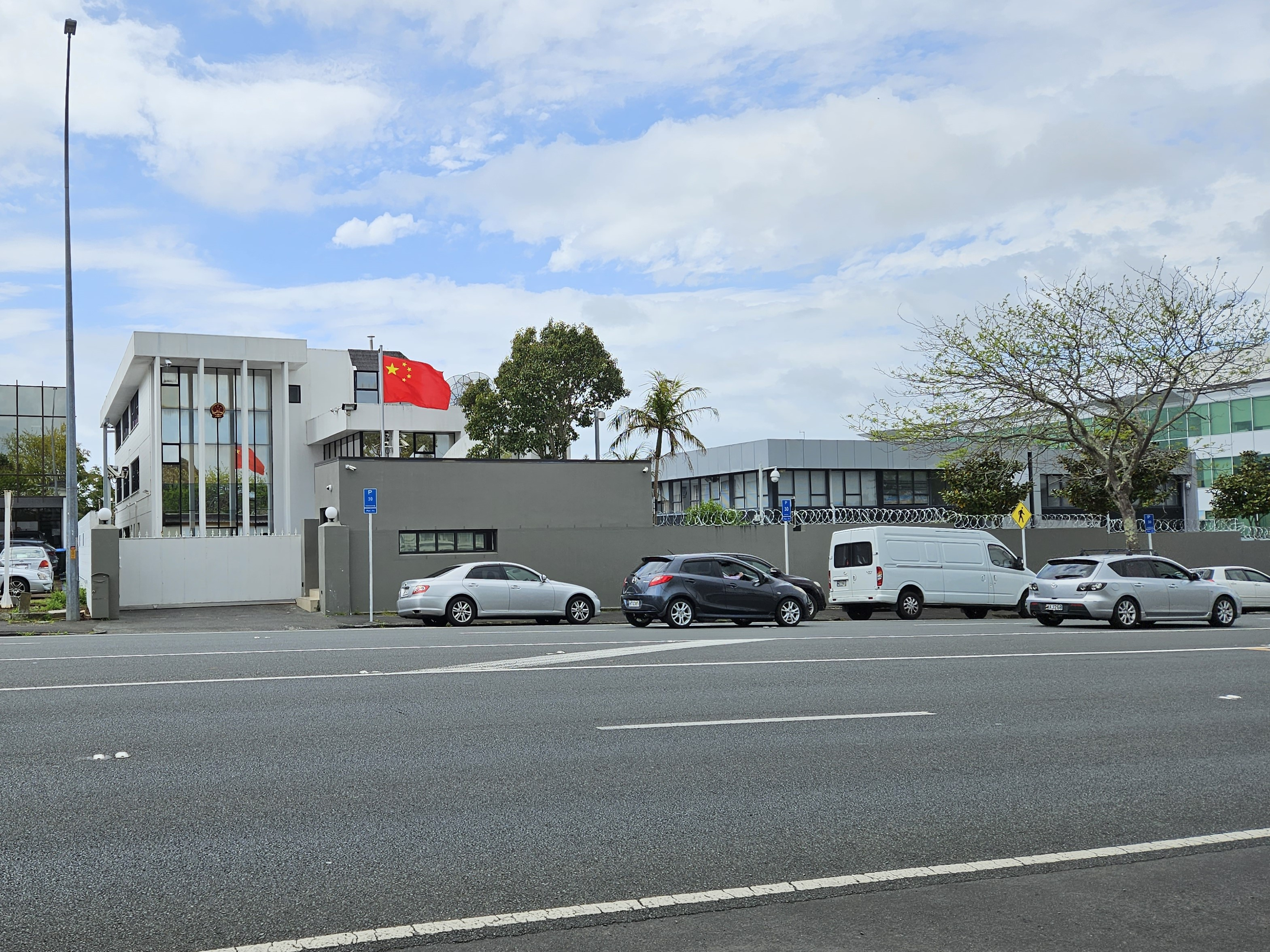
Consulate General in Auckland

=== Multilateral organizations ===
Organization	Host city	Host country	Mission	Chinese name	Ref.
African Union	Addis Ababa	Ethiopia	Mission	驻非盟使团	
ASEAN	Jakarta	Indonesia	Mission	驻东盟使团	
European Union	Brussels	Belgium	Mission	驻欧盟使团	
ICAO	Montreal	Canada	Permanent Mission	常驻国际民航组织理事会代表处	
OPCW	The Hague	Netherlands	Permanent Mission	常驻禁止化学武器组织代表团	
ESCAP	Bangkok	Thailand	Permanent Mission	常驻联合国亚洲及太平洋经济和社会委员会代表处	
International Seabed Authority	Kingston	Jamaica	Permanent Mission	常驻国际海底管理局代表处	
WTO	Geneva	Switzerland	Permanent Mission	常驻世界贸易组织代表团	
United Nations	New York City	United States	Permanent Mission	常驻联合国代表团	
United Nations	Geneva	Switzerland	Permanent Mission	常驻联合国日内瓦办事处和瑞士其他国际组织代表团	
United Nations	Vienna	Austria	Permanent Mission	常驻维也纳联合国和其他国际组织代表团	
UNESCO	Paris	France	Permanent Mission	常驻联合国教科文组织代表团	

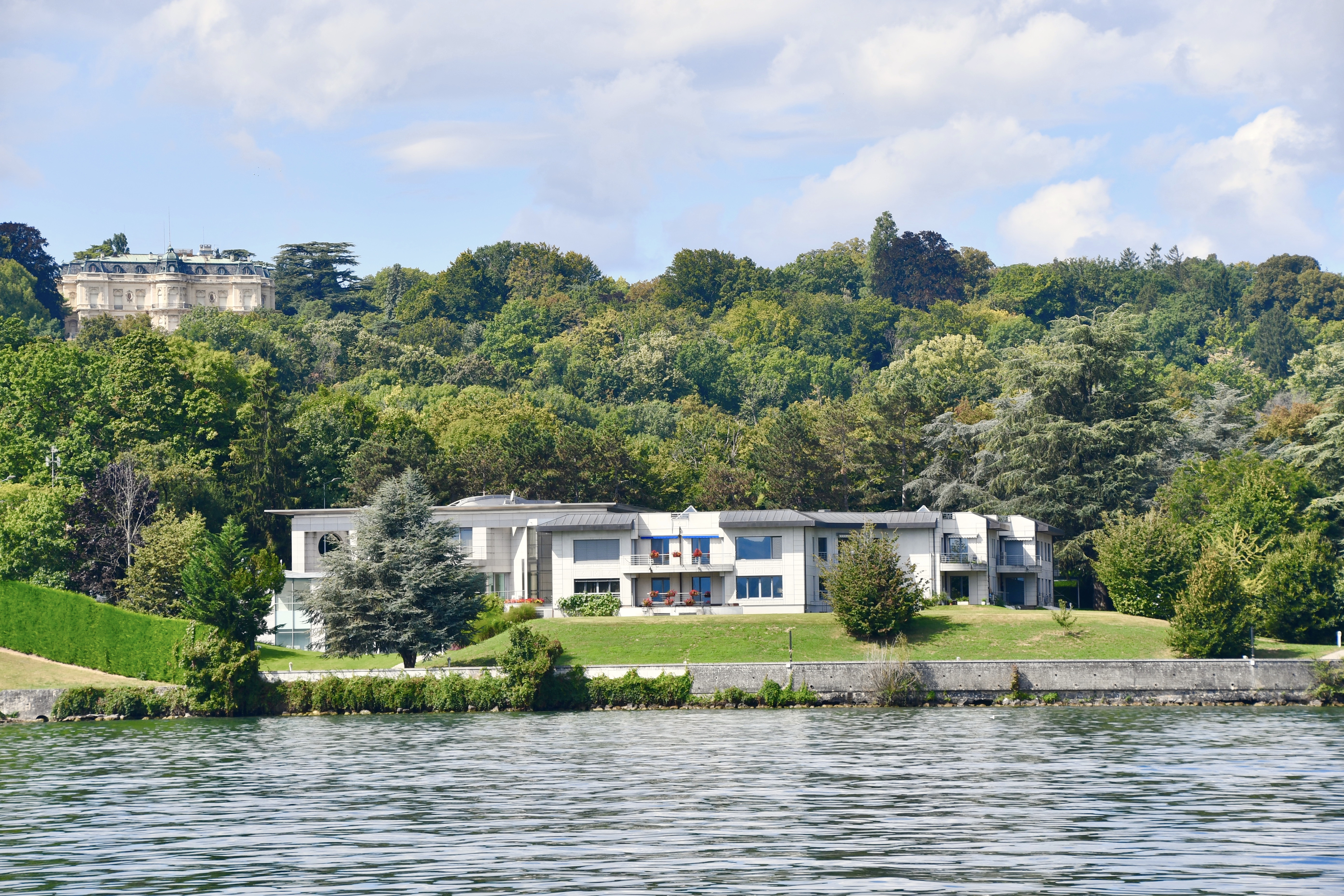
Permanent Mission to the United Nations in Geneva

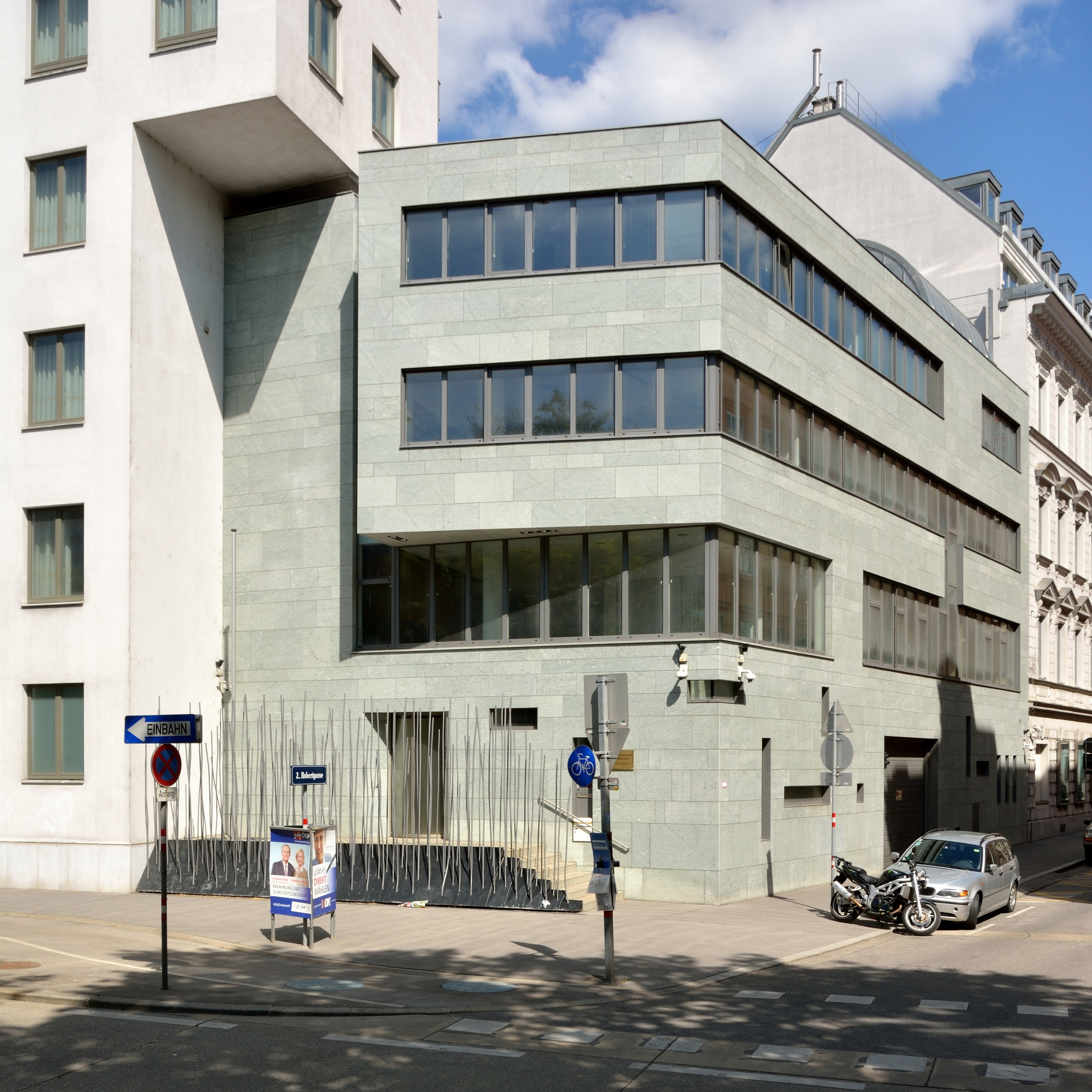
Permanent Mission to UNIDO in Vienna

== Closed missions ==
=== Africa ===
Host country	Host city	Mission	Year closed	Ref.
Equatorial Guinea	Bata	Consulate-General	2024	
Cameroon	Douala	Consulate	2017	
Madagascar	Toamasina	Consulate	2015	

=== Americas ===
Host country	Host city	Mission	Year closed	Ref.
Chile	Iquique	Consulate-General	2017	
Colombia	Barranquilla	Consulate	2017	
Saint Lucia	Castries	Embassy	2007	
United States	Houston	Consulate-General	2020	

=== Asia ===
Host country	Host city	Mission	Year closed	Ref.
Kyrgyzstan	Osh	Consulate	2017	
Indonesia	Banjarmasin	Consulate	1965	
Indonesia	Makassar	Consulate	1965	
Laos	Phongsali	Consulate	1976	
Turkey	İzmir	Consulate-General	2019	
Vietnam	Haiphong	Consulate	1959	
Yemen	Sanaa	Embassy	2015	
Yemen	Aden	Consulate-General	Unknown	

=== Europe ===
Host country	Host city	Mission	Year closed	Ref.
Poland	Gdańsk	Consulate-General (Note: Closed between 1962 and 1965, and finally in 2024.)	2024	
Romania	Constanța	Consulate-General	2017	
Ukraine	Odesa	Consulate-General	2022	

=== Oceania ===
Host country	Host city	Mission	Year closed	Ref.
Marshall Islands	Majuro	Embassy	1998	

== See also ==
- Foreign relations of the People's Republic of China
  - Ambassadors of the People's Republic of China
  - List of diplomatic missions in China
  - United States bombing of the Chinese Embassy in Belgrade
- Foreign relations of the Republic of China
  - List of diplomatic missions of Taiwan
  - List of diplomatic missions in Taiwan
- Foreign relations of imperial China
- List of diplomatic missions of the Qing dynasty
