= Lists of ambassadors of China =

Lists of ambassadors of China may refer to:

== A ==
- List of ambassadors of China to Afghanistan
- List of ambassadors of China to Albania
- List of ambassadors of China to Angola
- List of ambassadors of China to Antigua and Barbuda
- List of ambassadors of China to ASEAN
- List of ambassadors of China to Australia
- List of ambassadors of China to Austria
- List of ambassadors of China to Azerbaijan

== B ==
- List of ambassadors of China to Barbados
- List of ambassadors of China to Belarus
- List of ambassadors of China to Belgium
- List of ambassadors of China to Belize
- List of ambassadors of China to Benin
- List of ambassadors of China to Botswana
- List of ambassadors of China to Brazil
- List of ambassadors of China to Burkina Faso

== C ==
- List of ambassadors of China to Cambodia
- List of ambassadors of China to Canada
- List of ambassadors of China to the Central African Republic
- List of ambassadors of China to Chad
- List of ambassadors of China to Chile
- List of ambassadors of China to Colombia
- List of ambassadors of China to Cuba

== D ==
- List of ambassadors of China to the Democratic Republic of the Congo
- List of ambassadors of China to Dominica
- List of ambassadors of China to the Dominican Republic

== E ==
- List of ambassadors of China to Ecuador
- List of ambassadors of China to Egypt
- List of ambassadors of China to El Salvador
- List of ambassadors of China to Equatorial Guinea
- List of ambassadors of China to Eritrea
- List of ambassadors of China to Estonia
- List of ambassadors of China to Ethiopia

== F ==
- List of ambassadors of China to Fiji
- List of ambassadors of China to Finland
- List of ambassadors of China to France

== G ==
- List of ambassadors of China to Gabon
- List of ambassadors of China to Germany
- List of ambassadors of China to Ghana
- List of ambassadors of China to Greece
- List of ambassadors of China to Guinea
- List of ambassadors of China to Guinea-Bissau
- List of ambassadors of China to Guyana

== H ==
- List of ambassadors of China to Honduras
- List of ambassadors of China to Hungary

== I ==
- List of ambassadors of China to Iceland
- List of ambassadors of China to India
- List of ambassadors of China to Indonesia
- List of ambassadors of China to Iran
- List of ambassadors of China to Iraq
- List of ambassadors of China to Ireland
- List of ambassadors of China to Israel
- List of ambassadors of China to Italy
- List of ambassadors of China to Ivory Coast

== J ==
- List of ambassadors of China to Jamaica
- List of ambassadors of China to Japan
- List of ambassadors of China to Jordan

== K ==
- List of ambassadors of China to Kazakhstan
- List of ambassadors of China to Kenya
- List of ambassadors of China to Kiribati
- List of ambassadors of China to Kuwait
- List of ambassadors of China to Kyrgyzstan

== L ==
- List of ambassadors of China to Laos
- List of ambassadors of China to Latvia
- List of ambassadors of China to Lebanon
- List of ambassadors of China to Lesotho
- List of ambassadors of China to Liberia
- List of ambassadors of China to Libya
- List of ambassadors of China to Liechtenstein
- List of ambassadors of China to Lithuania
- List of ambassadors of China to Luxembourg

== M ==
- List of ambassadors of China to North Macedonia
- List of ambassadors of China to Madagascar
- List of ambassadors of China to Malawi
- List of ambassadors of China to Malaysia
- List of ambassadors of China to the Maldives
- List of ambassadors of China to Mali
- List of ambassadors of China to Malta
- List of ambassadors of China to Mauritania
- List of ambassadors of China to Mauritius
- List of ambassadors of China to Mexico
- List of ambassadors of China to the Federated States of Micronesia
- List of ambassadors of China to Moldova
- List of ambassadors of China to Monaco
- List of ambassadors of China to Mongolia
- List of ambassadors of China to Montenegro
- List of ambassadors of China to Morocco
- List of ambassadors of China to Mozambique
- List of ambassadors of China to Myanmar

== N ==
- List of ambassadors of China to Namibia
- List of ambassadors of China to Nauru
- List of ambassadors of the Republic of China to Nauru
- List of ambassadors of China to Nepal
- List of ambassadors of China to the Netherlands
- List of ambassadors of China to New Zealand
- List of ambassadors of China to Nicaragua
- List of ambassadors of China to Niger
- List of ambassadors of China to Nigeria
- List of ambassadors of China to Niue
- List of ambassadors of China to North Korea
- List of ambassadors of China to Norway

== O–R ==
- List of ambassadors of China to Oman
- List of ambassadors of China to Pakistan
- List of ambassadors of China to Palestine
- List of ambassadors of China to Panama
- List of ambassadors of China to Papua New Guinea
- List of ambassadors of China to Peru
- List of ambassadors of China to the Philippines
- List of ambassadors of China to Poland
- List of ambassadors of China to Portugal
- List of ambassadors of China to Qatar
- List of ambassadors of China to Romania
- List of ambassadors of China to Russia
- List of ambassadors of China to Rwanda

== S ==
- List of ambassadors of China to Saint Lucia
- List of ambassadors of China to Samoa
- List of ambassadors of China to San Marino
- List of ambassadors of China to São Tomé and Príncipe
- List of ambassadors of China to Saudi Arabia
- List of ambassadors of China to Senegal
- List of ambassadors of China to Serbia
- List of ambassadors of China to Seychelles
- List of ambassadors of China to Sierra Leone
- List of ambassadors of China to Singapore
- List of ambassadors of China to Slovakia
- List of ambassadors of China to Slovenia
- List of ambassadors of China to the Solomon Islands
- List of ambassadors of China to Somalia
- List of ambassadors of China to South Africa
- List of ambassadors of China to South Korea
- List of ambassadors of China to South Sudan
- List of ambassadors of China to Spain
- List of ambassadors of China to Sri Lanka
- List of ambassadors of China to Sudan
- List of ambassadors of China to Suriname
- List of ambassadors of China to Sweden
- List of ambassadors of China to Switzerland
- List of ambassadors of China to Syria

== T ==
- List of ambassadors of China to Tajikistan
- List of ambassadors of China to Tanzania
- List of ambassadors of China to Thailand
- List of ambassadors of China to the Arab League
- List of ambassadors of China to the United Arab Emirates
- List of ambassadors of China to Timor-Leste
- List of ambassadors of China to Togo
- List of ambassadors of China to Tonga
- List of ambassadors of China to Trinidad and Tobago
- List of ambassadors of China to Tunisia
- List of ambassadors of China to Turkey
- List of ambassadors of China to Turkmenistan

== U–Z ==
- List of ambassadors of China to Uganda
- List of ambassadors of China to Ukraine
- List of ambassadors of China to the United Kingdom
- List of ambassadors of China to the United States
- List of ambassadors of China to Uruguay
- List of ambassadors of China to Uzbekistan
- List of ambassadors of China to Vanuatu
- List of ambassadors of China to Venezuela
- List of ambassadors of China to Vietnam
- List of ambassadors of China to Yemen
- List of ambassadors of China to Zambia
- List of ambassadors of China to Zimbabwe

== See also ==
- Ambassadors of China
- Ambassador of China to the European Union
- Permanent Representative of China to the United Nations
