= Ambassadors of China =

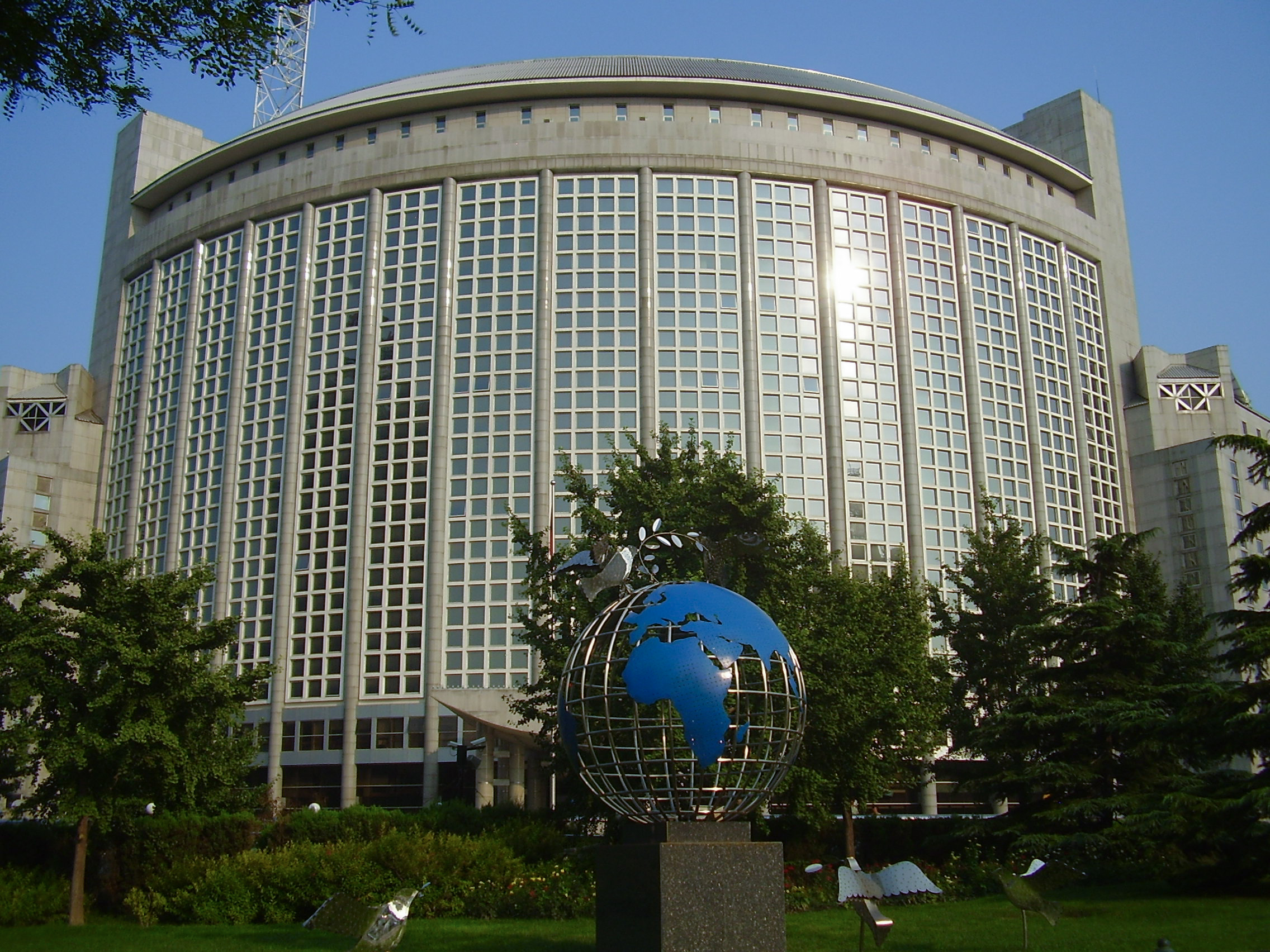
Ministry of Foreign Affairs of China

This article contains several lists of ambassadors of the People's Republic of China. The incumbents change from time to time; sometimes a post starts or stops being temporarily headed by a lower ranking diplomat. Occasionally, a post is created or abolished.

In accordance with articles 67 and 81 of the Constitution of China, ambassadors are selected by the Standing Committee of the National People's Congress and officially appointed by the President of China.

== Current ambassadors of China ==
Ambassador information is primarily taken from the Ministry of Foreign Affairs ambassador information pages. In certain cases, the information is taken from the relevant embassy website.

Host country	Ref	Ambassador	Embassy Website	Confirmed
Afghanistan	Ref	Zhao Xing (赵星)	Kabul	2023.09
Albania	Ref	Pang Chunxue (庞春雪)	Tirana	2024.01
Algeria	Ref	Dong Guangli (董广利)	Algiers	2024.12
Andorra	Ref	Yao Jing (姚敬)	Madrid	2023.09
Angola	Ref	Zhang Bin (张斌)	Luanda	2024.02
Antigua and Barbuda	Ref	Jiang Wei (蒋薇)	St. John's	2025.11
Argentina	Ref	Wang Wei (王卫)	Buenos Aires	2023.09
Armenia	Ref	Li Xinwei (李鑫炜)	Yerevan	2025.04
Australia	Ref	Qian Xiao (肖千)	Canberra	2022.01
Austria	Ref	Qi Mei (亓玫)	Vienna	2023.03
Azerbaijan	Ref	Lu Mei (鲁梅)	Baku	2025.04
Bahamas	Ref	Yan Jiarong (严家蓉)	Nassau	2024.07
Bahrain	Ref	Ni Ruchi (倪汝池)	Manama	2023.02
Bangladesh	Ref	Yao Wen (姚文)	Dhaka	2022.12
Barbados	Ref	Zheng Bingkai (郑冰开)	Christ Church	2025.08
Belarus	Ref	Zhang Wenchuan (张汶川)	Minsk	2024.09
Belgium	Ref	Fei Shengchao (费胜潮)	Brussels	2024.06
Benin	Ref	Zhang Wei (张伟)	Cotonou	2024.11
Bolivia	Ref	Wang Liang (王亮)	La Paz	2024.01
Bosnia and Herzegovina	Ref	Li Fan (李凡)	Sarajevo	2024.12
Botswana	Ref	Fan Yong (范勇)	Gaborone	2024.08
Brazil	Ref	Zhu Qingqiao (祝青桥)	Brasilia	2022.12
Brunei	Ref	Chen Shaochun (陈少春)	Seri Begawan	2026.01
Bulgaria	Ref	Dai Qingli (戴庆利)	Sofia	2024.05
Burkina Faso	Ref	Zhao Deyong (赵德勇)	Ouagadougou	2025.07
Burundi	Ref	Zhu Kewei (朱克玮)	Bujumbura	2026.03
Cambodia	Ref	Wang Wenbin (汪文斌)	Phnom Penh	2024.07
Cameroon	Ref	Xu Yong (徐永)	Yaoundé	2025.08
Canada	Ref	Wang Di (王镝)	Ottawa	2024.05
Cape Verde	Ref	Zhang Yang (张洋)	Praia	2025.07
Central African Republic	Ref	Li Qinfeng (李钦峰)	Bangui	2023.01
Chad	Ref	Wang Xining (王晰宁)	Ndjamena	2022.09
Chile	Ref	Niu Qingbao (牛清报)	Santiago	2021.02
Colombia	Ref	Zhu Jingyang (朱京阳)	Bogotá	2023.08
Comoros	Ref	Huang Zheng (黄峥)	Moroni	2025.08
Democratic Republic of the Congo	Ref	Zhao Bin (赵斌)	Kinshasa	2023.06
Republic of the Congo	Ref	An Qing (安青)	Brazzaville	2025.06
Cook Islands	Ref	Wang Xiaolong (王小龙)	Wellington	2022.01
Costa Rica	Ref	Wang Xiaoyao (王晓瑶)	San José	2024.05
Croatia	Ref	Qi Qianjin (齐前进)	Zagreb	2021.11
Cuba	Ref	Hua Xin (华昕)	Havana	2024.06
Cyprus	Ref	Vacant	Nicosia	TBA
Czech Republic	Ref	Feng Biao (冯飚)	Prague	2022.11
Denmark	Ref	Wang Xuefeng (王雪峰)	Copenhagen	2024.07
Djibouti	Ref	Hu Bin (胡斌)	Djibouti City	2021.07
Dominica	Ref	Chu Maoming (储茂明)	Roseau	2024.04
Dominican Republic	Ref	Chen Luning (陈鲁宁)	Santo Domingo	2023.04
Ecuador	Ref	Sun Xiangyang (孙向阳)	Quito	2025.09
Egypt	Ref	Liao Liqiang (廖力强)	Cairo	2019.06
El Salvador	Ref	Zhang Yanhui (张艳辉)	San Salvador	2023.01
Equatorial Guinea	Ref	Wang Wengang (王文刚)	Malabo	2023.12
Eritrea	Ref	Vacant	Asmara	TBA
Estonia	Ref	Guo Xiaomei (郭晓梅)	Tallinn	2023.09
Ethiopia	Ref	Chen Hai (陈海)	Addis Ababa	2024.08
Fiji	Ref	Zhou Jian (周剑)	Suva	2023.01
Finland	Ref	Vacant	Helsinki	TBA
France	Ref	Deng Li (邓励)	Paris	2025.01
Gabon	Ref	Zhou Ping (周平)	Libreville	2024.08
Gambia	Ref	Liu Jin (刘晋)	Banjul	2022.08
Georgia	Ref	Zhou Qian (周谦)	Tbilisi	2022.05
Germany	Ref	Deng Hongbo (邓洪波)	Berlin	2024.09
Ghana	Ref	Cong Song (丛耸)	Accra	2026.03
Greece	Ref	Fang Qiu (方遒)	Athens	2024.11
Grenada	Ref	Yang Shu (杨舒)	St. George's	2025.09
Guinea	Ref	Sun Yong (孙勇)	Conakry	2025.08
Guinea-Bissau	Ref	Yang Renhuo (杨仁火)	Bissau	2024.04
Guyana	Ref	Yang Yang (杨扬)	Georgetown	2025.04
Honduras	Ref	Yu Bo (于波)	Tegucigalpa	2023.08
Hungary	Ref	Gong Tao (龚韬)	Budapest	2023.09
Iceland	Ref	He Rulong (何儒龙)	Reykjavik	2022.02
India	Ref	Xu Feihong (徐飞洪)	New Delhi	2024.05
Indonesia	Ref	Wang Lutong (王鲁彤)	Jakarta	2024.10
Iran	Ref	Cong Peiwu (丛培武)	Tehran	2024.05
Iraq	Ref	Cui Wei (崔巍)	Baghdad	2022.04
Ireland	Ref	Zhao Xiyuan (赵希源)	Dublin	2024.11
Israel	Ref	Xiao Junzheng (肖军正)	Tel Aviv	2024.11
Ivory Coast	Ref	Wu Jie (吴杰)	Yamoussoukro	2023.05
Italy	Ref	Vacant	Rome	TBA
Jamaica	Ref	Wang Jinfeng (王锦峰)	Kingston	2025.08
Japan	Ref	Wu Jianghao (吴江浩)	Tokyo	2023.03
Jordan	Ref	Guo Wei (郭伟)	Amman	2025.11
Kazakhstan	Ref	Han Chunlin (韩春霖)	Astana	2024.12
Kenya	Ref	Guo Haiyan (郭海燕)	Nairobi	2025.01
Kiribati	Ref	Vacant	South Tarawa	TBA
North Korea	Ref	Wang Yajun (王亚军)	Pyongyang	2023.03
South Korea	Ref	Dai Bing (戴兵)	Seoul	2024.12
Kuwait	Ref	Yang Xin (杨欣)	Yarmouk	2025.12
Kyrgyzstan	Ref	Liu Jiangping (刘江平)	Bishkek	2024.12
Laos	Ref	Fang Hong (方虹)	Vientiane	2024.06
Latvia	Ref	Tang Songgen (唐松根)	Riga	2023.06
Lebanon	Ref	Chen Chuandong (陈传东)	Beirut	2025.06
Lesotho	Ref	Yang Xiaokun (杨晓坤)	Maseru	2024.06
Liberia	Ref	Yin Chengwu (尹承武)	Monrovia	2023.09
Libya	Ref	Ma Xuliang (马旭亮)	Tripoli	2026.02
Liechtenstein	Ref	Chen Yun (陈昀)	Zurich	2023.03
Lithuania	Ref	Vacant	Vilnius	TBA
Luxembourg	Ref	Hua Ning (华宁)	Luxembourg	2022.08
Madagascar	Ref	Ji Ping (季平)	Antananarivo	2024.03
Malawi	Ref	Lu Xu (陆旭)	Lilongwe	2025.02
Malaysia	Ref	Ouyang Yujing (欧阳玉靖)	Kuala Lumpur	2020.12
Maldives	Ref	Kong Xianhua (孔宪华)	Male	2025.04
Mali	Ref	Li Xiang (李响)	Bamako	2025.12
Malta	Ref	Zhang Zuo (张佐)	St. Julian's	2025.09
Mauritania	Ref	Tang Zhongdong (唐中东)	Nouakchott	2024.12
Mauritius	Ref	Huang Shifang (黄世芳)	Belle Rose	2025.05
Mexico	Ref	Chen Daojiang (陈道江)	Mexico City	2025.06
Federated States of Micronesia	Ref	Wu Wei (吴伟)	Kolonia	2023.06
Moldova	Ref	Dong Zhihua (董志华)	Chisinau	2025.11
Monaco	Ref	Deng Li (邓励)	Paris	2025.01
Mongolia	Ref	Shen Minjuan (沈敏娟)	Ulaanbaatar	2023.09
Montenegro	Ref	Chen Xufeng (陈绪峰)	Podgorica	2025.08
Morocco	Ref	Yu Jinsong (余劲松)	Rabat	2025.09
Mozambique	Ref	Zheng Xuan (郑璇)	Maputo	2025.05
Myanmar	Ref	Ma Jia (马珈)	Yangon	2024.08
Namibia	Ref	Zhao Weiping (赵卫平)	Windhoek	2023.01
Nauru	Ref	Lyu Jin (吕进)	Yaren	2024.07
Nepal	Ref	Zhang Maoming (张茂明)	Kathmandu	2026.02
Netherlands	Ref	Shen Bo (申博)	The Hague	2025.12
New Zealand	Ref	Wang Xiaolong (王小龙)	Wellington	2022.01
Nicaragua	Ref	Qu Yuhui (瞿瑜辉)	Managua	2025.11
Niger	Ref	Lyu Guijun (律桂军)	Niamey	2025.09
Nigeria	Ref	Yu Dunhai (于敦海)	Abuja	2024.08
Niue	Ref	Wang Xiaolong (王小龙)	Wellington	2022.01
North Macedonia	Ref	Jiang Xiaoyan (蒋小燕)	Skopje	2025.10
Norway	Ref	Hou Yue (侯悦)	Oslo	2023.01
Oman	Ref	Lyu Jian (吕健)	Muscat	2024.12
Pakistan	Ref	Jiang Zaidong (姜再冬)	Islamabad	2023.09
Palestine	Ref	Vacant	Ramallah	TBA
Panama	Ref	Xu Xueyuan (徐学渊)	Panama City	2024.03
Papua New Guinea	Ref	Yang Xiaoguang (杨晓光)	Port Moresby	2024.07
Peru	Ref	Song Yang (宋扬)	Lima	2022.08
Philippines	Ref	Jing Quan (井泉)	Manila	2025.12
Poland	Ref	Lu Shan (卢山)	Warsaw	2025.08
Portugal	Ref	Yang Yirui (杨义瑞)	Lisbon	2025.12
Qatar	Ref	Cao Xiaolin (曹小林)	Doha	2024.01
Romania	Ref	Chen Feng (陈峰)	Bucharest	2025.09
Russia	Ref	Zhang Hanhui (张汉晖)	Moscow	2019.08
Rwanda	Ref	Gao Wenqi (高文棋)	Kigali	2025.06
Samoa	Ref	Fei Mingxing (费明星)	Apia	2024.01
San Marino	Ref	Vacant	Rome	TBA
São Tomé and Príncipe	Ref	Xu Yingzhen (徐迎真)	São Tomé	2020.10
Saudi Arabia	Ref	Chang Hua (常华)	Riyadh	2024.05
Senegal	Ref	Li Zhigang (李志刚)	Dakar	2025.04
Serbia	Ref	Li Ming (李明)	Belgrade	2023.09
Seychelles	Ref	Lin Nan (林楠)	Victoria	2023.12
Sierra Leone	Ref	Zhao Yong (赵勇)	Freetown	2025.12
Singapore	Ref	Cao Zhongming (曹忠明)	Singapore	2024.03
Slovakia	Ref	Cai Ge (蔡革)	Bratislava	2023.09
Slovenia	Ref	Kang Yan (康艳)	Ljubljana	2025.12
Solomon Islands	Ref	Cai Weiming (蔡蔚鸣)	Honiara	2023.12
Somalia	Ref	Wang Yu (王昱)	Mogadishu	2024.08
South Africa	Ref	Wu Peng (吴鹏)	Pretoria	2024.06
South Sudan	Ref	Ma Qiang (马强)	Juba	2022.09
Spain	Ref	Yao Jing (姚敬)	Madrid	2023.09
Sri Lanka	Ref	Qi Zhenhong (戚振宏)	Colombo	2020.10
Sudan	Ref	Vacant	Khartoum	TBA
Suriname	Ref	Lin Ji (林棘)	Paramaribo	2024.11
Sweden	Ref	Zhou Limin (周立民)	Stockholm	2026.03
Switzerland	Ref	Qian Minjian (钱敏坚)	Bern	2025.06
Syria	Ref	Shi Hongwei (史宏微)	Damascus	2023.01
Tajikistan	Ref	Guo Zhijun (郭志军)	Dushanbe	2025.07
Tanzania	Ref	Chen Mingjian (陈明健)	Dar es Salaam	2021.10
Thailand	Ref	Zhang Jianwei (张建卫)	Bangkok	2025.07
Timor-Leste	Ref	Wang Wenli (王文丽)	Dili	2023.10
Togo	Ref	Wang Min (王敏)	Lomé	2025.06
Tonga	Ref	Liu Weimin (刘为民)	Nuku'alofa	2024.04
Trinidad and Tobago	Ref	Ren Hongyan (任洪岩)	Port of Spain	2025.08
Tunisia	Ref	Wan Li (万黎)	Tunis	2023.01
Turkey	Ref	Jiang Xuebin (姜学斌)	Ankara	2025.01
Turkmenistan	Ref	Ji Shumin (吉树民)	Ashgabat	2025.07
Uganda	Ref	Vacant	Kampala	TBA
Ukraine	Ref	Ma Shengkun (马升琨)	Kyiv	2024.11
United Arab Emirates	Ref	Zeng Jixin (曾继新)	Abu Dhabi	2026.03
United Kingdom	Ref	Zheng Zeguang (郑泽光)	London	2021.06
United States	Ref	Xie Feng (谢锋)	Washington, D.C.	2023.05
Uruguay	Ref	Huang Yazhong (黄亚中)	Montevideo	2023.09
Uzbekistan	Ref	Yu Jun (于骏)	Tashkent	2023.07
Vanuatu	Ref	Li Minggang (李名刚)	Port Vila	2022.08
Venezuela	Ref	Lan Hu (蓝虎)	Caracas	2023.04
Vietnam	Ref	He Wei (何炜)	Hanoi	2024.09
Yemen	Ref	Vacant	Sana’a	TBA
Zambia	Ref	Han Jing (韩镜)	Lusaka	2024.08
Zimbabwe	Ref	Zhou Ding (周鼎)	Harare	2023.06

== Ambassadors to international organizations ==
Current ambassadors from the People's Republic of China to international organizations

Host organization	Ambassador	Embassy Website	Confirmed
Arab League	Liao Liqiang (廖力强)	Cairo	2019.06
Association of Southeast Asian Nations	Wang Qing (王擎)	Jakarta	2026.01
African Union	Jiang Feng (蒋烽)	Addis Ababa	2025.07
European Union	Cai Run (蔡润)	Bruxelles	2024.09
United Nations	Fu Cong (傅聪)	New York	2024.04
United Nations Office in Geneva	Jia Guide (贾桂德)	Geneva	2025.12
United Nations Office in Vienna	Li Song (李松)	Vienna	2023.02
United Nations Office in Bangkok	Ye Xuenong (叶学农)	Bangkok	2024.05
Food and Agriculture Organization	Zhang Lubiao (张陆彪)	Rome	2024.11
World Trade Organization	Li Yongjie (李詠箑)	Geneva	2025.09
International Seabed Authority	Wang Jinfeng (王锦峰)	Kinston	2025.08
Organisation for the Prohibition of Chemical Weapons	Shen Bo (申博)	The Hague	2025.12

== Ambassadors-at-large ==
Current ambassador-at-Large from the People's Republic of China with worldwide responsibility

Title (competence)	Ambassador	since
Ambassador of China for Disarmament Affairs (特命全权裁军事务大使)	Shen Jian (沈健)	2023.08

== See also ==
- Foreign relations of China
- List of diplomatic missions of China
