= List of ambassadors of China to Uzbekistan =

Coordinates: 41.306776°N 69.287847°E

Chinese Ambassador to Uzbekistan
- Inaugural holder: Guan Hengguang
- Formation: February 1992; 34 years ago

The Chinese ambassador to Uzbekistan is the official representative of the People's Republic of China to the Republic of Uzbekistan.

== List of representatives ==
Diplomatic agrément/Diplomatic accreditation	Ambassador	Chinese language zh:中国驻乌兹别克斯坦大使列表	Observations	Premier of the People's Republic of China	Prime Minister of Uzbekistan	Term end
January 3, 1992			The governments in Beijing and Tashkent established diplomatic relations.	Li Peng	Abdulhashim Mutalov	
February 1992	Guan Hengguang	zh:关恒广	From February 1992 to January 1997 he was Ambassador in Tashkent.; From September 1998 to February 2002 he was Chinese Ambassador to Lithuania.	Li Peng	Abdulhashim Mutalov	January 1997
January 1997	Li Jingxian	zh:李景贤	From February 1995 - November 1996 he was Chinese Ambassador to Georgia.; From January 1997 - July 2001 he was Ambassador in Tashkent.	Li Peng	Oʻtkir Sultonov	July 2001
August 2001	Zhang Zhiming	zh:张志明 (外交官)	From March 1998 to August 1998 he was Chinese Ambassador to Kyrgyzstan.; From August 2001 to October 2003 he was ambassador in Tashkent.	Zhu Rongji	Oʻtkir Sultonov	October 2003
October 2003	Gao Yusheng	zh:高玉生	From March 2001 - August 2003 he was Chinese Ambassador to Turkmenistan.; From October 2003 - October 2005 he was ambassador in Tashkent.; From November 2005 - January 2007 he was Chinese Ambassador to Ukraine.	Wen Jiabao	Oʻtkir Sultonov	October 2005
October 2005	Yu Hongjun (PRC diplomat)	zh:于洪君	(*January 1954)	Wen Jiabao	Shavkat Mirziyoyev	December 2010
April 2011	Zhang Xiao (PRC diplomat)	zh:张霄		Wen Jiabao	Shavkat Mirziyoyev	December 2013
February 2014	Sun Lijie	孙立杰		Li Keqiang	Shavkat Mirziyoyev→Abudulla Aripov	January 2018
January 2018	Jiang Yan	姜岩		Li Keqiang	Abudulla Aripov	Marzo 2023
