= List of ambassadors of China to Tonga =

Coordinates: 39.909428°N 116.437955°E

Chinese Ambassador to Tonga
- Inaugural holder: Sampson C. Shen
- Formation: 1 April 1972; 54 years ago

The Chinese ambassador to Tonga is the official representative of the People's Republic of China to the Kingdom of Tonga.

== List of representatives ==
Diplomatic agrément/Diplomatic accreditation	Ambassador	Chinese language zh:中国驻汤加大使列表	Observations	Prime Minister of Tonga	Premier of the People's Republic of China	Term end
April 10, 1972			The governments in Nukuʻalofa and Taipei established diplomatic relations.	Fatafehi Tuʻipelehake	Zhou Enlai	
April 1, 1972	Sampson C. Shen	zh:沈锜	(*October 1, 1917 – 2004)	Fatafehi Tuʻipelehake	Zhou Enlai	May 1, 1978
June 7, 1975	Kao Chen	zh:高铮	Chargé d'affaires	Fatafehi Tuʻipelehake	Hua Guofeng	
May 1, 1978	Kao Chen	zh:高铮	Also accredited as ambassador to Tuvalu. (*January 23, 1920) graduated from the National University in Political Science.: received a master's degree from the University of Southern California.; chief, the Consulate General of the Republic of China in Los Angeles.; chief of the Embassy in Saigon South Vietnam.; chief of the consulate in Timor.; In 1966 he was appointed Consul General of the Republic of China in Songkhla.; In 1969 he was appointed Deputy Director of the Ministry of Foreign Affairs.; In 1975 he became Chargé d'affaires in Nukuʻalofa; In 1978 was promoted ambassador to Tonga.; In 1979 he was accredited concurrently as ambassador to Tuvalu.	Fatafehi Tuʻipelehake	Hua Guofeng	February 1, 1981
1979	Chang Kas		Chargé d'affaires	Fatafehi Tuʻipelehake	Hua Guofeng	
February 1, 1981	Chien Ai-wen	钱爱虔		Fatafehi Tuʻipelehake	Zhao Ziyang	December 1, 1989
July 1, 1989	Hugh H. Ou-Yang	欧阳璜	In 1989 he was accredited concurrently as ambassador to Tuvalu.; In 1993 he was accredited concurrently as ambassador to Nauru.	Fatafehi Tuʻipelehake	Li Peng	February 1, 1996
February 1, 1996	Tu, Chi-Kwang	屠继光	In 1999 he was accredited concurrently as ambassador to Tuvalu and Nauru.	Baron Vaea	Li Peng	November 1, 1998
November 2, 1998			The governments in Nukuʻalofa and Beijing established diplomatic relations.	Baron Vaea	Zhu Rongji	
December 1, 1998	Zhang Binhua	zh:张滨华	From December 1998 - March 2002 he was Ambassador in Nukuʻalofa.; From April 2002 - June 2004 he was Chinese Ambassador to Micronesia.	Baron Vaea	Zhu Rongji	March 1, 2002
December 1, 2001	Gao Shanhai	zh:高善海		Tupou VI	Zhu Rongji	November 1, 2005
December 1, 2005	Hu Yeshun	zh:胡业顺	From December 2005 - October 2008 he was Ambassador in Nukuʻalofa.; From August 2010 - March 2013 he was Chinese Ambassador to Latvia.	Tupou VI	Wen Jiabao	October 1, 2008
October 1, 2008	Fan Guijin	zh:樊桂金	From November 2001 - August 2004 he was Chinese Ambassador to Sierra Leone.; From December 2004 - November 2007 he was Chinese Ambassador to Uganda.; From October 2008 - October 2010 he was Ambassador in Nukuʻalofa.	Feleti Sevele	Wen Jiabao	October 1, 2010
October 1, 2010	Wang Donghua	zh:王東華		Feleti Sevele	Wen Jiabao	November 1, 2013
December 1, 2013	Huang Huaguang	黄华光		Sialeʻataongo Tuʻivakanō	Li Keqiang	May 1, 2017
May 1, 2017	Wang Baodong	王保东		ʻAkilisi Pōhiva	Li Keqiang	September 12, 2019

== See also ==
- China–Tonga relations
