= List of ambassadors of China to Sudan =

Coordinates: 15.592816°N 32.577770°E

Chinese Ambassador to Sudan
- Incumbent; Li Lianhe since 1 November 2014
- Inaugural holder: Wang Yutian
- Formation: 1 April 1959; 67 years ago

The Chinese ambassador to Sudan is the official representative of the People's Republic of China to the Republic of the Sudan.

== List of representatives ==
Diplomatic agrément/Diplomatic accreditation	Ambassador	Chinese language zh:中国驻苏丹大使列表	Observations	Premier of the People's Republic of China	List of heads of state of Sudan	Term end
January 1, 1956			Independence of the Sudan from the United Kingdom.	Zhou Enlai	Sovereignty Council	
February 4, 1959			The governments in Khartoum and Beijing established diplomatic relations.	Zhou Enlai	Ibrahim Abbud	
April 1, 1959	Wang Yutian	zh:王雨田	From April 1959 - March 1962 he was ambassador in Khartoum (Sudan).; From April 1964 - June 1969 he was Chinese Ambassador to Kenya.; From June 1969 - January 1973 he was Chinese Ambassador to the Republic of the Congo.; From May 1973 - May 1974 he was Chinese Ambassador to Germany.	Zhou Enlai	Ibrahim Abbud	March 1, 1962
July 1, 1962	Gu Xiaobo	zh:谷小波		Zhou Enlai	Ibrahim Abbud	December 1, 1965
February 1, 1966	Yu Peiwen	zh:俞沛文	From February 1966 - January 1967 he was ambassador in Khartoum (Sudan).; From May 1971 - July 1974 he was Chinese Ambassador to Ethiopia.; From September 1974 - January 1980 he was Chinese Ambassador to Austria.	Zhou Enlai	Ismail al-Azhari	January 1, 1967
April 1, 1970	Yang Shouzheng	zh:杨守正	(* 1915): From September 1964 - March 1967 he was Chinese Ambassador to Sudan.; From April 1970 - April 1974 he was ambassador in Khartoum (Sudan).; From December 1974 - July 1977 he was Chinese Ambassador to Ethiopia.; From November 1977 - January 1980 he was Chinese Ambassador to Mozambique.; From April 1980 - January 1985 he was Chinese Ambassador to Russia.	Zhou Enlai	Dschafar Muhammad an-Numairi	June 1, 1974
September 1, 1974	Zhang Yue (PRC diplomat)	張越		Zhou Enlai	Dschafar Muhammad an-Numairi	December 1, 1978
April 1, 1979	Song Hanyi	zh:宋寒毅	From July 1974 - January 1979 he was Chinese Ambassador to Morocco.; From April 1979 - October 1984 he was ambassador in Khartoum (Sudan).	Hua Guofeng	Dschafar Muhammad an-Numairi	October 1, 1984
November 1, 1984	Liu Hua (PRC diplomat)	zh:刘华 (外交官)	From June 1987 - October 1991 he was Chinese Ambassador to Turkey.; From November 1984 - August 1987 he was ambassador in Khartoum (Sudan).	Zhao Ziyang	Dschafar Muhammad an-Numairi	August 1, 1987
June 1, 1987	Hui Zhen (PRC diplomat)	zh:惠震	(*December 1932) In September 1948 he studied at the Yan'an university.	Li Peng	Ahmad al-Mirghani	October 1, 1991
September 1, 1991	Wu Decheng	zh:吴德成		Li Peng	Omar al-Bashir	March 1, 1996
December 1, 1995	Zhang Weiqiu	zh:张维秋	From December 1995 - August 1998 he was ambassador in Khartoum (Sudan).; From September 1998 - March 2003 he was Chinese Ambassador to Iraq.	Li Peng	Omar al-Bashir	August 1, 1998
April 1, 1998	Deng Shaoqin	zh:邓绍勤	From April 1998 - January 2002 he was ambassador in Khartoum (Sudan).; From August 2002 - October 2006 he was Chinese Ambassador to Oman.	Zhu Rongji	Omar al-Bashir	January 1, 2002
April 1, 2001	Zhang Dong	zh:张栋 (外交官)		Zhu Rongji	Omar al-Bashir	May 1, 2007
June 1, 2007	LI Chengwen	zh:李成文	(*February 1955): From November 2011 - June 2016 he was Chinese Ambassador to Saudi Arabia.; From June 2007 - September 2011 he was ambassador in Khartoum (Sudan).	Wen Jiabao	Omar al-Bashir	September 1, 2011
September 1, 2011	Luo Xiaoguang	zh:罗小光	From February 2006 - July 2009 he was Chinese Ambassador to Yemen.; From September 2011 - October 2014 he was ambassador in Khartoum (Sudan).	Wen Jiabao	Omar al-Bashir	October 1, 2014
November 1, 2014	Li Lianhe	李连和		Li Keqiang	Omar al-Bashir	

== See also ==
- China–Sudan relations
