= List of ambassadors of China to Moldova =

Coordinates: 47.032094°N 28.825632°E

Chinese Ambassador to Moldova
- Incumbent; Zhang Yinghong since August 2015
- Inaugural holder: Li FengLin
- Formation: May 1992; 34 years ago

The Chinese ambassador to Moldova is the official representative of the People's Republic of China to the Republic of Moldova.

== List of representatives ==
| Diplomatic agrément/Diplomatic accreditation | Ambassador | Chinese language zh:中国驻摩尔多瓦大使列表 | Observations | Premier of the People's Republic of China | Prime Minister of Moldova | Term end |
|---|---|---|---|---|---|---|
| December 27, 1991 | | | People's Republic of China acknowledges the independence of the Republic of Moldova | Li Peng | Valeriu Muravschi | |
| January 30, 1992 | | | establishment of diplomatic relations between the governments in Beijing and Chișinău. | Li Peng | Valeriu Muravschi | |
| May 1992 | Li FengLin | zh:李凤林 | concurrently accredited with residence in Bucharest.: From March 1989 to October 1991 he was ambassador in Sofia (Bulgaria).; From 1991 November to April 1995 he was ambassador in Bucharest Romania.; From June 1995 to September 1998 he was ambassador in Moscow. | Li Peng | Valeriu Muravschi | August 1993 |
| September 1993 | Deng Zhaocong | 邓朝从 | | Li Peng | Andrei Sangheli | February 1996 |
| May 1996 | Lin Zhenlong | 林贞龙 | | Li Peng | Andrei Sangheli | January 2002 |
| January 2002 | Xu Zhongkai | 徐中楷 | | Zhu Rongji | Vasile Tarlev | October 2005 |
| November 2005 | Gong Jianwei | zh:宫建伟 | From November 2005 to July 2008 he was ambassador in Chișinău (Moldova).; From September 2008 to October 2010 he was ambassador in Tiflis (Georgia (country)).; From January 2012 to December 2013 he was ambassador in Minsk (Belarus). | Wen Jiabao | Vasile Tarlev | July 2008 |
| August 2008 | Shi Longzhuang | 施隆壮 | | Wen Jiabao | Zinaida Greceanîi | July 2010 |
| July 2010 | Fang Li (PRC diplomat) | 房利 | | Wen Jiabao | Vlad Filat | January 2012 |
| January 2012 | Tong Mingtao | 佟明涛 | | Wen Jiabao | Vlad Filat | July 2015 |
| August 2015 | Zhang Yinghong | 張迎紅 | | Li Keqiang | Valeriu Streleț | |

== See also ==
- Ambassadors of China
