= Shi Chunlai =

Chinese Ambassador

Ambassador of China to Mexico
- In office May 1987 – July 1990
- Preceded by: Li Chao
- Succeeded by: Huang Shikang

Ambassador of China to Australia
- In office September 1990 – November 1993
- Preceded by: Zhang Zai
- Succeeded by: Hua Jundao

Personal details
- Born: 1931 (age 94–95) Hubei

Shi Chunlai (simplified Chinese: 石春来; traditional Chinese: 石春來; born 1931) is a retired Chinese Ambassador. He served as China's ambassador to Mexico and Australia and in counselor roles at embassies in Tanzania and Zimbabwe.

== Biography ==
Shi Chunlai was born in 1931 in Huanghua, Hebei, China. In 1949, he became a member of the Chinese Communist Party. Shi studied at Beijing Foreign Studies University but dropped out. He also studied at Peking University. Between March 1978 and 1983, he served at the Chinese embassy in Tanzania including as first secretary and counselor. In April 1980, he took office as counselor and chargé d'affaires ad interim for the Chinese embassy in Zimbabwe.

Shi served as the Chinese ambassador to Mexico between 1987 and 1990. He became the Chinese ambassador to Australia in September 1990. He submitted his diplomatic credentials to Bill Hayden, the Governor-General of Australia. After finding out that Australia planned to improve relations with his country, Shi secured approval to allow Australian officials to travel to Tibet to look into the region's human rights conditions. In December 1990, he voiced strong disapproval of an Australian Senate bill about Tibet that condemned China's human rights record there. Despite this, he said Australian officials could still travel to Tibet. Time magazine reported that the Australian Secret Intelligence Service, helped by 30 National Security Agency people, placed bugs in Shi's embassy during the Chinese embassy's relocation in 1990. Shi ended his stint as the Chinese ambassador to Australia in 1993. Starting in 1999, Shi became a senior advisor to the China Institute of International Studies. Around that time, he also joined the East Asia Vision Group (EAVG).

Shi frequently represented China at regional security talks in the 1990s. According to the scholar William Tow, Shi is arguably China's "foremost authority on Sino-Australian ties". Referring to the Council for Security Cooperation in the Asia Pacific (CSCAP), the political scientist Alastair Iain Johnston called Shi "a key figure in China's CSCAP committee".

While serving as secretary general of CSCAP, Shi wrote about preventive diplomacy and presented seven principles about it. He discussed actions China had taken in the Asia-Pacific, suggesting they were forms of preventive diplomacy. He cited how in its relations with Vietnam and India, China had reached provisional resolutions of border disputes. Among the other examples Shi cited were the 1996 Agreement on Confidence Building in the Military Field in the Border Area, signed by China, Russia, and three Central Asian countries, the Indonesia-led South China Sea meetings in which China participated, and annual China–Japan security talks. Stating that China's preventive diplomacy actions were successful, Shi introduced the "new security concept" doctrine.

=== Diplomatic roles ===
- He was Deputy Division Chief of the Department of Asia and Africa in the Ministry of Foreign Affairs of the People's Republic of China.
- He was First Secretary and Counselor of the Embassy of R. P. China in Dar es Salaam, Tanzania.
- He was Counselor of the Chinese Embassy in Harare, Zimbabwe.
- He was Deputy Chief of the Political Department of the Ministry of Foreign Affairs of the People's Republic of China.
- He was Director General for Africa of the Ministry of Foreign Affairs of the People's Republic of China.
- From May 1987 to July 1990 he was Ambassador of the People's Republic of China in Mexico City and until October 11, 1987, with accreditation in Belize City.
- From September 1990 to November 1993 he was Ambassador of the Republic of China Ambassador in Canberra, Australia, and concurrent accredited in Palikir, Federated States of Micronesia.
