= Gu Xiaobo =

Chinese diplomat (1912-2006)

- 谷小波

Chinese Ambassador to Sudan of China to Sudan
- In office July 1962 – January 1966
- Preceded by: Wang Yutian
- Succeeded by: Yu Pei wen

Ambassador of China to Benin of China to Benin
- In office June 1965 – January 1966
- Preceded by: Li Yunchuan
- Succeeded by: Zhang Junhua

Chinese Ambassador to Jordan of China to Jordan
- In office December 1977 – April 1982
- Preceded by: Wang Shuming
- Succeeded by: Huang Shixie

Personal details
- Born: 1912 Hebei, China
- Died: 22 August 2006 (aged 93–94) Beijing, China

Gu Xiaobo (1912 – 22 August 2006) was a Chinese diplomat who served as Ambassador to Sudan, Benin and Jordan.

- From April 1952 to April 1955 he was vice-chairman of the Tianjin Municipality Trade Union.
- In May 1953 he was member of the executive committee of the All-China Federation of Trade Unions.
- In August 1955 he was chairman of the Tianjin Municipality Trade Union.
- From July 1958 to 1960 he was vice-chairman of the Trade Union of Hebei Prov..
- From October 1958 to December 1964 he was deputy for Hebei to the 2nd National People's Congress.
- In 1959 he was vice-presisdent of the Tianjin University of Radio & TV.
- From July 1962 to December 1965 he was ambassador to Khartoum Sudan
- From June 1965 to January 1966 he was ambassador to Cotonou (Benin).
- From December 1977 to April 1982 he was ambassador to Amman (Jordan).

Gu Xiaobo died in Beijing on 22 August 2006.
