= List of ambassadors of China to the Arab League =

The Chinese ambassador to the Arab League is the official representative of the People's Republic of China to the Arab League.

== List of representatives ==
Name (English)	Name (Chinese)	Tenure begins	Tenure ends	Note
Wu Sike	吴思科	November 2005	2007	
Wu Chunhua	武春华	May 2008	2011	
Song Aiguo	宋爱国	August 2011	2019	
Liao Liqiang	廖力强	September 2019		
