= List of ambassadors of the Republic of China to Nauru =

Coordinates: 0.537051°S 166.910882°E

Ambassador of Republic of China (Taiwan) to Nauru
- Incumbent; Dean-Shiang Lin since January 30, 2023
- Inaugural holder: Chao Tsai-hsing
- Formation: November 22, 1988

The Taiwanese ambassador in the Aiwo District is the official representative of the Government in Taipei to the Government of Nauru. There was a representative of the Government in Beijing to the Government of Nauru between 2002 and 2005.

== List of representatives ==
Diplomatic agrément/Diplomatic accreditation	ambassador	Chinese language zh:中国驻瑙鲁大使列表	Observations	Premier of the Republic of China	President of Nauru	Term end
1980			The governments in the Yaren District and Taipei maintained diplomatic relations until July 2002, when Nauru established relations with China until May 2005.	Sun Yun-suan	Hammer DeRoburt	July 1, 2002
November 22, 1988	Chao Tsai-hsing		First consul general of Taiwan in Nauru	Yu Kuo-hwa	Hammer DeRoburt	
May 15, 2005	Timothy T. Y. Hsiang	項恬毅	Nauru reestablished diplomatic relations with Taiwan.	Frank Hsieh	Ludwig Scotty	July 11, 2014
July 11, 2014	Chin-Fa Chow	周進發	2012: Chow Chin-fa, deputy director-general of MOFA's Department of International Organizations.	Frank Hsieh	Baron Waqa	
June 7, 2019	Dean Hai-Lung Wang	王海龍		Su Tseng-chang	Baron Waqa	
January 30, 2023	Dean-Shiang Lin			Tsai Ing-wen	Russ Kun	
