= List of ambassadors of China to Papua New Guinea =

Coordinates: 9.435932°S 147.186115°E

Chinese Ambassador to Papua New Guinea
- Incumbent; Xue Bing since 26 May 2017
- Inaugural holder: Pei Jianzhang
- Formation: October 1977; 49 years ago

The Chinese ambassador to Papua New Guinea is the official representative of the People's Republic of China to the Independent State of Papua New Guinea.

== List of representatives ==
Diplomatic agrément/Diplomatic accreditation	Ambassador	Chinese language zh:中国驻巴布亚新几内亚大使列表	Observations	Premier of the People's Republic of China	Prime Minister of Papua New Guinea	Term end
October 1977	Pei Jianzhang	zh:裴坚章	Residence in Welington, From September 1979 to November 1984 he was ambassador in Tripoli	Hua Guofeng	Michael Somare	April 1980
April 1980	Lin Ping	zh:林平	Residence in Canberra.: From 1971 to September 11, 1973 he was ambassador in Santiago de Chile.; Since 1978 he was ambassador to Canberra.	Zhao Ziyang	Julius Chan	March 1983
March 1983	Hu Hongfan	zh:胡洪范	1985-1988 was ambassador in Caracas.	Zhao Ziyang	Michael Somare	December 1984
February 1985	Gao Jianzhong	zh:高建中	1988 1993 was ambassador to Sierra Leone.	Zhao Ziyang	Paias Wingti	August 1988
September 1988	Zhao Wei (PRC diplomat)	赵维		Li Peng	Rabbie Namaliu	August 1991
August 1991	Wang Nongshen	王弄笙		Li Peng	Rabbie Namaliu	February 1994
April 1994	Yuan Zude	袁祖德		Li Peng	Julius Chan	September 1996
September 1996	Zhang Pengxiang (PRC diplomat)	張鵬翔		Li Peng	Julius Chan	October 1999
December 1999	Zhao Zhenyu	趙振宇		Zhu Rongji	Mekere Morauta	March 2003
April 2003	Li Zhengjun	李正君		Wen Jiabao	Michael Somare	January 2006
March 2006	Wei Ruixing	魏瑞兴	1999: was appointed Consul General of P.R.China in Chicago	Wen Jiabao	Michael Somare	April 2010
May 2010	Qiu Bohua	仇伯华	08 2003 to September 2008 Ambassador in Lesotho	Wen Jiabao	Michael Somare	February 2014
April 15, 2014	Li Ruiyou	李瑞佑	Oct. 15, 1985 Vice Consul	Li Keqiang	Peter O'Neill	
May 2017	Xue Bing (1965)	薛冰	In 2008 he was Chargé d'affaires of the Chinese Ambassador to Kenya in Nairobi.	Li Keqiang	Peter O'Neill; James Marape	

- China–Papua New Guinea relations
