= List of ambassadors of China to the Dominican Republic =

Public office in China

Coordinates: 18.456208°N 69.941435°W

Ambassador of the People's Republic of China to the Dominican Republic
- 中华人民共和国驻多米尼加共和国大使; Zhōnghuá Rénmín Hònghéguó Zhù duō míng ní jiā Gònghéguó Dàshǐ
- National emblem of China
- Incumbent; Chen Luning since 11 April 2023
- Appointer: President of People's Republic of China
- Inaugural holder: Ti Tsun Li
- Formation: 1 July 1943; 83 years ago

The ambassador of China to the Dominican Republic is the official representative of the People's Republic of China to the Dominican Republic.

== List of representatives ==
Diplomatic agrément/Diplomatic accreditation	Ambassador	Chinese language zh:中国驻多米尼加大使列表	Observations	List of premiers of the Republic of China	List of presidents of the Dominican Republic	Term end
1940	Ti Tsun Li	李迪俊	Ambassador in Havana negotiated a treaty of Good Will between the two countries	Wang Jingwei	Rafael Leónidas Trujillo Molina	
July 1, 1943	Ti Tsun Li	李迪俊	With residence in Havana.	Chiang Kai-shek	Rafael Leónidas Trujillo Molina	March 1, 1947
March 1, 1947	Huang Yun-ssu	zh:黄芸苏	Dominican Republic In March, 1947 Huang Yun-ssu was appointed Minister to the Dominican Republic. The Dominican Minister to China, Dr. Leonte Guzman Sanchez, arrived in China and presented his credentials in October, 1946.	Chang Ch’ün	Rafael Leónidas Trujillo Molina	January 1, 1950
August 20, 1957			Legation becomes embassy	Yu Hung-Chun	Héctor B. Trujillo	
January 1, 1962	Liu Tseng-hua	zh:李琴	It said the Chinese Government has instructed Chinese Ambassador to Santo Domingo Liu Tseng-hua to extend the recognition to the provisional government. China and the Dominican Republic enjoy traditional friendship,	Chen Cheng	Rafael Filiberto Bonnelly	January 1, 1965
February 28, 1967	Sun Ping chien	zh:孙秉乾	In 1967 he was Consul general with the rank of minister in Osaka, when he was named ambassador to the Dominican Republic to succeed Liu Tseng-hua.	Yen Chia-kan	Joaquín Antonio Balaguer Ricardo	
November 5, 1971	Senba P.W. Seng	孙邦华	(*1903 in Shanghai) He was educated at the National University of Fuhtan and is married to Mrs. Mamie Chun.Mr. Senba P.W. Sun was appointed Ambassador of the Republic of China to the Dominican Republic in October, 1971, and presented his credentials on November 5, 1971. He was once Ambassador to Peru and Bolivia.	Chiang Ching-kuo	Joaquín Antonio Balaguer Ricardo	
January 1, 1975	Sun Peng-hua	董宗山	Since 1982 and in St. Vincent and the Grenadines	Chiang Ching-kuo	Joaquín Antonio Balaguer Ricardo	
January 1, 1976	Michael T. S. Tung			Chiang Ching-kuo	Joaquín Antonio Balaguer Ricardo	January 1, 1984
May 2, 1984	Wang Meng-hsien	王孟显	Committee of the Kuomintang Approved Wednesday at its weekly meeting on the appointment of Wang Meng-hsien, ambassador of the Republic of China in the Dominican Republic, concurrently serves as ambassador to St Lucia.Y in Dominica, St. Lucia, St. Vincent and the Grenadines, Saint Kitts and Nevis	Yu Kuo-hwa	Salvador Jorge Blanco	
December 7, 1990	Kuo Kang	国刚		Hau Pei-tsun	Salvador Jorge Blanco	January 1, 2000
February 1, 2000	Sun Ta-cheng	孙大成		Tang Fei	Hipólito Mejía	January 1, 2002
January 1, 2002	Ching-shan Hou	向延伫		Yu Shyi-kun	Hipólito Mejía	
January 1, 2003	Feng Chi-tai (John)	zh:冯寄台		Yu Shyi-kun	Hipólito Mejía	January 1, 2006
September 1, 2006	Eduardo Chen	陈显祥		Su Tseng-chang	Leonel Fernández	January 1, 2008
January 1, 2008	Isaac H. M. Tsai	蔡孟宏		Liu Chao-shiuan	Leonel Fernández	
January 1, 2012	Thomas C. Hou	侯平福		Sean Chen (politician)	Danilo Medina	October 1, 2015
October 1, 2015	Valentino Ji Zen Tang	汤继仁		Mao Chi-kuo	Danilo Medina	May 1, 2018
May 1, 2018			The governments in Beijing and Santo Domingo established diplomatic relations.	Li Keqiang	Danilo Medina	
August 24, 2018	Zhang Run	张润		Li Keqiang	Danilo Medina	

== See also ==
- China–Dominican Republic relations
