= Zhang Limin =

Chinese ambassador

Chinese Ambassador to Cyprus
- In office February 2003 – October 2005
- Preceded by: Song Aiguo
- Succeeded by: Zhao Yali

Chinese Ambassador to Latvia
- In office November 2005 – July 2008
- Preceded by: Ji Yanchi
- Succeeded by: Yao Peisheng

Chinese Ambassador to New Zealand
- In office August 2008 – August 2010
- Preceded by: Zhang Yuanyuan
- Succeeded by: Xu Jianguo

Chinese Ambassador to Guyana
- In office December 2012 – January 2017
- Preceded by: Yu Wenzhe
- Succeeded by: Cui Jianchun

Personal details
- Born: March 1950 (age 76) Hebei
- Spouse: Married
- Children: one daughter.
- Education: University graduate.

Zhang Limin (born March 1950) is a Chinese ambassador.

- From 1985 to 1986 he was director of the General Office of Beijing Personnel Service Corporation for Diplomatic Missions.
- From 1987 to 1992 he was deputy General-Manager of the Beijing International Club Corporation Limited.
- From 1992 to 1995 he was General-Manager of the Beijing International Club Corporation Limited.
- From 1995 to 2002 he was Director-General of the Beijing Service Bureau for Diplomatic Missions.
- From March 2003 to October 2005 he was ambassador in Nikosia (Cyprus).
- From November 2005 July 2008 he was ambassador in Riga (Latvia).
- On 19 August 2008 he was designated ambassador in Wellington (New Zealand) where he was from August 2008 to August 2010 accredited and coaccredited to Avarua (Cook Islands) and Alofi, Niue (Niue).
- From December 2012 to January 2017 he was ambassador in Georgetown (Guyana).

Currently he is a member of the Council for Promoting South–South Cooperation as well as the special consultant to the Research Center for Latin America at Southwestern University of Finance and Economics.
