= List of ambassadors of China to Lesotho =

Coordinates: 1.290981°S 36.797706°E

Chinese Ambassador to Lesotho
- Incumbent; Sun Xianghua since 1 June 2016
- Inaugural holder: Edward Kuan
- Formation: 1967; 59 years ago

The Chinese ambassador to Lesotho is the official representative of the People's Republic of China to the Kingdom of Lesotho.

== History ==
- In 1966, Lesotho declared independence.
- From 31 October 1966 to 14 May 1983 and from 5 April 1990 to 24 December 1993, the Republic of China (ROC) and Lesotho maintained diplomatic relations.
- From 30 April 1983 to 7 April 1990, the People's Republic of China (PRC) and Lesotho maintained diplomatic relations.
- Since 12 January 1994 the People's Republic of China (PRC) and Lesotho maintain diplomatic relations.

== List of representatives ==
| Diplomatic agrément/Diplomatic accreditation | Ambassador | Chinese language zh:中国驻莱索托大使列表 | Observations | Premier of the People's Republic of China | List of monarchs of Lesotho | Term end |
|---|---|---|---|---|---|---|
| 1967 | Edward Kuan | zh:关镛 | (*September 9, 1925) has served as ambassador extraordinary and plenipotentiary to Lesotho, South Africa and Saudi Arabia.: Consul General of the Consulate General of the Republic of China in Houston, Consul General of the Consulate General in Vancouver.; Deputy Director of the North American Division.; In 1967, he served as ambassador to the Republic of China in Lesotho.; In 1976 he was ambassador in Pretoria (South Africa).; In 1986 he was ambassador in Saudi Arabia.; In 1994 he was ambassador in Costa Rica. | Yen Chia-kan | Moshoeshoe II of Lesotho | June 1, 1972 |
| June 19, 1972 | Liu Ta-jen | 刘达人 | On June 19, 1972, Dr. Liu Ta-jen was appointed ambassador to Lesotho. | Chiang Ching-kuo | Moshoeshoe II of Lesotho | May 1, 1980 |
| May 15, 1980 | Chang Ping-na | 张炳南 | 15 May—The Executive Yuan Thursday approved the appoint – ments of Chang Ping-nan as ambassador to Lesotho, | Sun Yun-suan | Moshoeshoe II of Lesotho | May 1, 1983 |
| February 1, 1984 | Mu Ping | zh:牟屏 | | Zhao Ziyang | Moshoeshoe II of Lesotho | April 1, 1986 |
| May 1, 1986 | Tian Changsong | zh:田长松 | | Zhao Ziyang | Moshoeshoe II of Lesotho | February 1, 1990 |
| February 1990 | Le Junqing | 乐俊清 | 15 May 1983: The Government severed diplomatic links with Lesotho, which had decided to exchange ambassadors with the People's Republic of China. | Li Peng | Moshoeshoe II of Lesotho | April 1990 |
| May 1, 1990 | Kwei Tsung-Chun | 桂仲纯 | Lesotho, on December 30, 1993, was reported to have broken off diplomatic relations with the Republic of China (ROC) on Taiwan, after an alleged attempt by ROC nationals to bribe two Lesotho cabinet members. The ROC Ambassador resumed diplomatischen Beziehungen im April 1990. | Hau Pei-tsun | Moshoeshoe II of Lesotho | December 1, 1993 |
| June 1, 1994 | Lin Tinghai | zh:林廷海 | * From March 1991 to April 1994 he was ambassador to The Gambia. | Li Peng | Moshoeshoe II of Lesotho | November 1, 1997 |
| December 1, 1997 | Chen Laiyuan | zh:陈来元 | *From July 2000 to June 2003 he was ambassador to Namibia | Li Peng | Letsie III of Lesotho | June 1, 2000 |
| July 1, 2000 | Zhang Xianyi | zh:张宪一 | July 2000 - June 2003: Ambassador in Maseru (Lesotho).; September 2003 - December 2006: Ambassador to Harare Zimbabwe.; March 2009 - February 2012 Ambassador to Bangladesh.; March 2012 - March 2015 Ambassador to Slovenia. | Zhu Rongji | Letsie III of Lesotho | June 1, 2003 |
| August 1, 2003 | Qiu Bohua | zh:仇伯华 | *From May 2010 to February 2014 he was ambassador in Papua New Guinea | Wen Jiabao | Letsie III of Lesotho | September 1, 2008 |
| September 1, 2008 | Gao Deyi | zh:高德毅 | | Wen Jiabao | Letsie III of Lesotho | March 1, 2011 |
| April 1, 2011 | Hu Dingxian | zh:胡定贤 | *From March 2008 - March 2011 he was ambassador to Bahamas | Wen Jiabao | Letsie III of Lesotho | June 1, 2016 |
| June 1, 2016 | Sun Xianghua | 孙祥华 | | Li Keqiang | Letsie III of Lesotho | |
