= List of ambassadors of China to Seychelles =

Coordinates: 39.919678°N 116.451590°E

Chinese Ambassador to Seychelles
- Incumbent; Yu Jinsong since December 2016
- Inaugural holder: Liu Chun
- Formation: April 1978; 48 years ago

The Chinese ambassador to Seychelles is the official representative of the People's Republic of China to the Republic of Seychelles.

== List of representatives ==
Diplomatic agrément/Diplomatic accreditation	Ambassador	Chinese language zh:中国驻塞舌尔大使列表	Observations	Premier of the People's Republic of China	List of presidents of Seychelles	Term end
June 30, 1976			The Scheychelles became independent and the governments in Victoria, Seychelles and Beijing established diplomatic relations.	Hua Guofeng	James Mancham	
April 1978	Liu Chun	zh:刘春 (外交官)	Concurrently, with residence in Dar es Salaam. (*1918 - 2007 17. August ): From October 1962 - January 1967 he was ambassador in Laos.; From May 1972 - March 1976 Ambassador of the People's Republic of China to Turkey.; From May 1976 - October 1979 he was ambassador in Tanzania.; From April 1980 - August 1982 he was ambassador in Egypt.	Hua Guofeng	France-Albert René	September 1979
February 1980	He Gongkai	zh:何功楷	Concurrently, with residence in Dar es Salaam.	Zhao Ziyang	France-Albert René	March 1985
January 6, 1986	pl:Huang Guocai	黃國材	Concurrently, with residence in Dar es Salaam. (*1931)	Zhao Ziyang	France-Albert René	May 1988
March 19, 1988	Shi Nailiang	zh:施乃良	Concurrently, with residence in Port Louis.: From March 1985 - April 1988 Ambassador of the People's Republic of China to Cameroon.; From July 1988 - May 1992 es:Anexo:Embajadores de China en Mauricio ambassador in Victoria Mauritius.; From December 1988 - May 1992 Ambassador of the People's Republic of China to Seychelles	Li Peng	France-Albert René	May 1992
July 1992	Yang Yihuai	zh:杨一怀	Concurrently, with residence in Dar es Salaam.	Li Peng	France-Albert René	December 1993
October 1993	Zhang Daxun	张大勋		Li Peng	France-Albert René	July 1997
May 1997	Wang Xinshi	zh:王信石	From May 1997 to April 2000 he was ambassador to the Seychelles.; From August 2001 to January 2005 he was ambassador to Benin.; From January 2005 to May 2007 he was ambassador to Iceland.	Li Peng	France-Albert René	April 2000
April 2000	Hou Guixin	侯贵信	Hou Guixin (China / The Seychelles) The People's Republic of China new ambassador to The Seychelles has taken up his functions in Mahe. Aged 49 years, Hon Guixin holds a diploma from a higher education establishment of his country.	Zhu Rongji	France-Albert René	June 2002
June 2002	Chen Meifen	陈美芬		Zhu Rongji	France-Albert René	December 2005
January 2006	Geng Wenbing	zh:耿文兵		Wen Jiabao	James Michel	April 2008
May 2008	Wang Weiguo	王衛國		Wen Jiabao	James Michel	October 2011
November 2011	Shi Zhongjun	史忠俊	(* August 1957): Since March 2016 he is ambassador of the People's Republic of China to Switzerland.; From May 2008 to August 2011 he was ambassador in Benin.; From January 2006 to April 2008 he was ambassador on the Seychelles.	Wen Jiabao	James Michel	October 2014
October 2014	Yin Lixian	殷立贤		Li Keqiang	James Michel	December 2016
December 2016	Yu Jinsong	余劲松		Li Keqiang	James Michel	

== See also ==
- China–Seychelles relations
