= List of ambassadors of China to São Tomé and Príncipe =

Coordinates: 0.338792°N 6.737975°E

Chinese Ambassador to São Tomé and Príncipe
- Incumbent; Wang Wei since 3 April 2017
- Inaugural holder: Liu Yingxian
- Formation: May 1976; 50 years ago

The Chinese ambassador to São Tomé and Príncipe is the official representative of the People's Republic of China to the Democratic Republic of São Tomé and Príncipe.

== List of representatives ==
Diplomatic agrément/Diplomatic accreditation	Ambassador	Chinese language zh:中国驻圣多美和普林西比大使列表	Observations	Premier of the People's Republic of China	List of prime ministers of São Tomé and Príncipe	Term end
July 12, 1975			The governments in Beijing and São Tomé established diplomatic relations.	Chiang Ching-kuo	Miguel Trovoada	
May 1976	Liu Yingxian	zh:刘英仙	with residence in Libreville (Gabon).: From March 1980 to November 1983 he was ambassador to Guinea-Bissau and accredited in Cape Verde.	Chiang Ching-kuo	Miguel Trovoada	December 1979
March 1980	Liu Yufeng	柳雨峰	with residence in Libreville (Gabon).	Sun Yun-suan	Manuel Pinto da Costa	June 1984
January 1985	Tian Yimin	田逸民	with residence in Libreville (Gabon).	Yu Kuo-hwa	Manuel Pinto da Costa	February 1989
April 1989	An Fengshi	安峰石	with residence in Libreville (Gabon).	Lee Huan	Celestino Rocha da Costa	November 1992
December 1992	Sun Zhirong	孙治荣	with residence in Libreville (Gabon).	Hau Pei-tsun	Norberto Costa Alegre	May 1996
June 1996	Zuo Shusen	左树森	with residence in Libreville (Gabon).	Lien Chan	Raul Bragança Neto	July 1997
May 6, 1997			The governments in Taipei and São Tomé established diplomatic relations.	Vincent Siew	Raul Bragança Neto	
July 5, 2002	Ko Chi-sheng	柯吉生		Yu Shyi-kun	Gabriel Costa	
March 9, 2008	Chen Chung	陳忠	the current representative to New Zealand, will be the new ambassador to São Tomé and Príncipe.	Liu Chao-shiuan	Joaquim Rafael Branco	
April 5, 2012	Jack Cheng Cheng Yu-tai	程豫台		Sean Chen (politician)	Gabriel Costa	
December 2016			The governments in Beijing and São Tomé established diplomatic relations.	Li Keqiang	Patrice Trovoada	
April 3, 2017	Wang Wei		Chinese business attaché, Embassy in São Tomé and Príncipe reopens on 3 April 2017, China's embassy in São Tomé and Príncipe was reopened on Monday after being closed for nearly 19 years,	Li Keqiang	Patrice Trovoada	

== See also ==
- China–São Tomé and Príncipe relations
