= List of consuls general of China to Liechtenstein =

The Chinese consul general to Liechtenstein is the official representative of the People's Republic of China to Liechtenstein.

== List of representatives ==
Name (English)	Name (Chinese)	Tenure begins	Tenure ends	Note
Xin Futan	辛福坦	31 May 1988	10 July 1990	
Xu Youjun	许右军	10 July 1990	22 September 1993	
Chen Dazhen	陈大震	22 September 1993	25 April 1998	
Li Duanben	李端本	25 April 1998	January 2002	
Lu Wenjie	陆文杰	February 2002	February 2007	
Li Xiaosi	李晓驷	March 2007	January 2010	
Liang Jianquan	梁建全	January 2010	March 2014	
Mao Jingqiu	毛静秋	April 2014	December 2015	
Gao Yanping	高燕平	January 2016	April 2018	
Zhao Qinghua	赵清华	May 2018	March 2023	
Chen Yun	陈昀	March 2023		

== See also ==
- China–Liechtenstein relations
