= List of ambassadors of China to Latvia =

Coordinates: 56.969582°N 24.106940°E

Ambassador of China to Latvia
- Incumbent; Huang Yong since August 2015
- Inaugural holder: Tang Longbin
- Formation: October 1991; 34 years ago

The ambassador of China to Latvia is the official representative of the People's Republic of China to the Republic of Latvia.

== History ==
In 1991, after the independence of Latvia, the diplomatic relations with the People's Republic of China were established on 12 September 1991.

== List of representatives ==
Diplomatic agrément/Diplomatic accreditation	Ambassador	Chinese language zh:中国驻拉脱维亚大使列表	Observations	List of premiers of the Republic of China	Prime Minister of Latvia	Term end	
October 1991	Tang Longbin	zh:唐龙彬	concurrently accredited with residence in Stockholm.	Li Peng	Ivars Godmanis		February 1992
February 1992	Chen Di (PRC diplomat 1940)	zh:陈棣	(*1940), concurrently accredited to Riga, Estonia and Lithuania: September 1993 - July 1997 Ambassador to Kazakhstan.; From March 1998 to October 2000 he was Ambassador in Warsaw Poland	Li Peng	Ivars Godmanis		January 1995
March 1995	Wang Fengxiang	zh:王凤祥		Li Peng	Māris Gailis		March 1998
March 1998	Yao Peisheng	zh:姚培生		Zhu Rongji	Guntars Krasts		April 2000
April 2000	Wang Kaiwen	zh:王开文		Zhu Rongji	Andris Šķēle		July 2003
August 2003	Ji Yanchi	zh:季雁池		Wen Jiabao	Einars Repše		November 2005
November 2005	Zhang Limin	zh:张利民		Wen Jiabao	Aigars Kalvītis		July 2008
August 2008	Cheng Wenjv	zh:程文举		Wen Jiabao	Ivars Godmanis		July 2010
August 2010	Hu Yeshun	zh:胡业顺		Wen Jiabao	Valdis Dombrovskis		February 2013
March 2013	Yang Guoqiang	楊國強		Li Keqiang	Valdis Dombrovskis		July 2015
August 2015	Huang Yong (PRC diplomat)	黃勇		Li Keqiang	Laimdota Straujuma		
