= List of ambassadors of China to North Macedonia =

Coordinates: 41.983633°N 21.432748°E

Chinese Ambassador to North Macedonia
- Incumbent; Wen Zhenshun since May 2014
- Inaugural holder: Xu Yuehe
- Formation: May 1996; 30 years ago

The Chinese ambassador to North Macedonia is the official representative of the People's Republic of China to the Republic of North Macedonia.

== List of representatives ==
Diplomatic agrément/Diplomatic accreditation	Ambassador	Chinese language zh:中国驻北马其顿大使列表	Observations	Premier of the People's Republic of China	Prime Minister of North Macedonia	Term end
May 1996	Xu Yuehe	许月荷		Li Peng	Branko Crvenkovski	February 1999
January 1, 1999			Immediately after Ljubčo Georgievski was elected, he recognized the government in Taipei, the government in Beijing closed its embassy in Skopje.	Vincent Siew	Ljubčo Georgievski	
May 2000	Loh I-cheng	陸以正	visited Skopje but got no accreditation.	Tang Fei	Ljubčo Georgievski	
June 2001	Zhang Wanxue	zh:张万学	From June 2001 to February 2007 he was ambassador in Skopje.; From October 2007 to August 2010 he was ambassador in Sofia (Bulgaria).; From August 2011 to June 2014 he was ambassador in Belgrade (Serbia).	Zhu Rongji	Ljubčo Georgievski	February 2007
February 2007	Dong Chunfeng	董春风		Wen Jiabao	Nikola Gruevski	August 2011
August 2011	Cui Zhiwei	崔志伟		Wen Jiabao	Nikola Gruevski	May 2014
May 2014	Wen Zhenshun	温振顺		Li Keqiang	Nikola Gruevski	
