= List of ambassadors of China to Venezuela =

Coordinates: 10.482782°N 66.864624°W

Chinese Ambassador to Venezuela
- Inaugural holder: Tan Shao-hua
- Formation: 9 April 1941; 85 years ago

The Chinese ambassador to Venezuela is the official representative of the People's Republic of China to the Bolivarian Republic of Venezuela.

== List of representatives ==
Diplomatic agrément/Diplomatic accreditation	Ambassador	Chinese language zh:中国驻委内瑞拉大使列表	Observations	Premier of the People's Republic of China	List of presidents of Venezuela	Term end
April 9, 1941	Tan Shao-hua	谭绍华	With Reisidence in Rio de Janeiro.	Chiang Kai-shek	Isaías Medina Angarita	January 7, 1942
January 7, 1942	Li Dijun	李迪俊	Chinese Ambassador to Cuba	Chiang Kai-shek	Isaías Medina Angarita	May 7, 1947
August 4, 1944			Embassy in Caracas officially opened.	Chiang Kai-shek	Isaías Medina Angarita	
May 7, 1947	Mui King Chau	梅景周	Chinese Ambassador to Cuba	Chang Ch’ün	Rómulo Betancourt	
June 26, 1947	Yu Wang-teh	于望德	Chinese Minister to Colombia and concurrently Minister to Ecuador	Chang Ch’ün	Rómulo Betancourt	July 1, 1959
November 1, 1954	Yuan Tze-kien	zh:袁子健		Yu Hung-Chun	Marcos Pérez Jiménez	November 1, 1956
November 1, 1956	Yen Wan-li	嚴萬里		Yu Hung-Chun	Marcos Pérez Jiménez	August 1, 1966
July 1, 1966			The mission in Caracas was upgraded to an embassy.	Yen Chia-kan	Rómulo Betancourt	
August 1, 1966	Sih Shou-heng	薛寿衡		Yen Chia-kan	Rómulo Betancourt	May 1, 1970
May 1, 1970	Wei Chi-min	zh:魏济民		Yen Chia-kan	Rafael Caldera	February 1, 1972
February 1, 1972	Wang Chih- chen	王之珍		Chiang Ching-kuo	Rafael Caldera	July 1, 1974
June 28, 1974			The governments in Caracas and Beijing established diplomatic relations.	Zhou Enlai	Carlos Andrés Pérez	
November 1, 1975	Ling Qing	zh:凌青		Zhou Enlai	Carlos Andrés Pérez	January 1, 1978
May 1, 1978	Zheng Weizhi	zh:郑为之	(*1912-1914 en Guangdong † 1993): From 1951 to 1955 he was Counsellor of the Mission in Karachi, Pakistan.; From 1956 to 1961 he was Chinese Ambassador to Denmark.; From 1961 to 1964 he directed the America and Australia Department of Ministry of Foreign Affairs of the People's Republic of China.; From 1972 to 1977 he was Chinese Ambassador to Argentina.	Hua Guofeng	Carlos Andrés Pérez	February 1, 1981
May 1, 1981	Wei Yongqing	zh:卫永清		Zhao Ziyang	Luis Herrera Campins	August 1, 1984
May 1, 1985	Hu Hongfan	zh:胡洪范		Zhao Ziyang	Jaime Lusinchi	March 1, 1988
August 1, 1988	Chen Dehe	zh:陈德和		Li Peng	Jaime Lusinchi	June 1, 1991
July 1, 1991	Huang Zhiliang	zh:黄志良		Li Peng	Carlos Andrés Pérez	December 1, 1993
February 1, 1994	Sun Yanheng	zh:孙延珩		Li Peng	Rafael Caldera	December 1, 1996
February 1, 1997	Liu Boming	zh:刘伯鸣		Li Peng	Rafael Caldera	October 1, 2000
November 1, 2000	Wang Zhen	zh:王珍		Zhu Rongji	Hugo Chávez	July 1, 2003
September 1, 2003	Ju Yijie	zh:居一杰		Wen Jiabao	Hugo Chávez	October 1, 2007
October 1, 2007	Zhang Tuo	zh:张拓		Wen Jiabao	Hugo Chávez	December 1, 2009
February 1, 2010	Zhao Rongxian	zh:赵荣宪		Wen Jiabao	Hugo Chávez	July 1, 2015
July 1, 2015	Zhao Bentong	趙本堂	December 14, 2017	Li Keqiang	Nicolás Maduro	March 11, 2023
December 14, 2017	Li Baorong	李宝荣	December 14, 2017	Li Keqiang	Nicolas Maduro	March 11, 2023

== See also ==
- China–Venezuela relations
- Taiwan–Venezuela relations
