= List of ambassadors of China to Benin =

Coordinates: 6.353771°N 2.396167°E

Ambassador of China to Benin
- National emblem of China
- Incumbent; Diao Mingsheng since December 2014
- Inaugural holder: Li Yunchuan
- Formation: June 1965; 61 years ago

The ambassador of China to Benin is the official representative of the People's Republic of China to the Republic of Benin.

== List of representatives ==
| ambassador | Chinese language | Appointed/accredited | Term end |
|---|---|---|---|
| Li Yunchuan | 李云川 | June 1965 | January 1966 |
| Gu Xiaobo | 谷小波 | June 1973 | October 1977 |
| Zhang Junhua | 张俊华 | January 1978 | March 1982 |
| Sun Zhicheng | 孙志诚 | November 1982 | December 1985 |
| Zhu Xiansong | 朱显松 | December 1985 | October 1988 |
| Zhu Yourong | 祝有容 | November 1988 | October 1992 |
| Zhao Huimin | 赵惠民 | October 1992 | December 1996 |
| Duan Chunlai | 段春来 | December 1996 | April 1999 |
| Yuan Guohou | 袁国厚 | April 1999 | June 2001 |
| Wang Xinshi | 王信石 | August 2001 | January 2005 |
| Li Beifen | 李蓓芬 | December 2004 | April 2008 |
| Geng Wenbing | 耿文兵 | May 2008 | August 2011 |
| Tao Weiguang | 陶卫光 | August 2011 | December 2014 |
| Diao Mingsheng | 刁鸣生 | December 2014 | |

== See also ==
- Ambassadors of the People's Republic of China
