= List of ambassadors of China to Burkina Faso =

Coordinates: 12.369370°N 1.516393°W

Chinese Ambassador to Burkina Faso
- National emblem of China
- Inaugural holder: Jui Cheng-kao
- Formation: 20 March 1962; 64 years ago

The Chinese ambassador to Burkina Faso is the official representative of the People's Republic of China (PRC) to Burkina Faso. In the past, Burkina Faso has alternated between recognizing the PRC and the Republic of China (ROC) as the legitimate government of China.

== List of representatives ==
Diplomatic agreement/Diplomatic accreditation	Ambassador	Chinese government	Observations	Premier of China	List of prime ministers of Burkina Faso	Term end
March 20, 1962	Bernard T. K. Joei (芮正皋)	ROC	Charge d'affaires: China established an embassy in Ouagadougou, capital of Upper Volta, with Counselor Bernard T. K. Joei as charge d'affaires.	Chen Cheng	Maurice Yaméogo	July 21, 1968
May 23, 1965	Bernard T. K. Joei	ROC	(14 August 1919 in Zhejiang until 9 March 2015)	Yen Chia-kan	Maurice Yaméogo	1968
June 7, 1966	Hsu Ma-hsi (徐懋禧)	ROC	Until 1966 he was embassy minister in Kinshasa.: the governments in Taipei and Ouagadougou broke their diplomatic relations	Yen Chia-kan	Maurice Yaméogo	October 1973
November 1973	Xie Bangzhi	PRC		Zhou Enlai; Hua Guofeng	Aboubacar Sangoulé Lamizana	December 1978
May 1979	Zhou Min	PRC		Hua Guofeng; Zhao Ziyang	Joseph Conombo	July 1984
January 1984	Feng Zhishan (江志山)	PRC		Zhao Ziyang	Thomas Sankara	September 1986
September 1986	Jiang Xiang	PRC	From 1986 to 1990 he was ambassador in Ouagadougou.; From 1990 to 1994 he was Chinese Ambassador to Guinea.	Zhao Ziyang; Li Peng	Thomas Sankara	January 1990
May 1990	Wu Jiasen	PRC		Li Peng	Thomas Sankara	August 1993
September 1993	Li Yongqian	PRC	In 1996 he became Chinese Ambassador to Mali.	Lien Chan	Youssouf Ouédraogo	February 1994
February 1994	Li Yongqian	ROC		Lien Chan	Roch Marc Kaboré	December 2001
December 2001	Tao Wen-lung (陶文隆)	ROC		Tang Fei	Paramanga Ernest Yonli	2009
December 2009	Zhang Mingzhong (張銘忠)	ROC		Wu Den-yih	Tertius Zongo	2013
March 28, 2013	Shen Chen-hong	ROC		Jiang Yi-huah	Luc-Adolphe Tiao	May 2018
October 19, 2018	Li Jian (李健)	PRC	On May 26, 2018, the governments in Beijing and Ouagadougou reestablished their diplomatic relations.	Li Keqiang	Paul Kaba Thieba	March 11, 2023

== See also ==
- Burkina Faso–Taiwan relations
- Burkina Faso–China relations
