= List of ambassadors of China to Timor-Leste =

Coordinates: 8.544537°S 125.548189°E

Ambassador of China to East Timor
- Incumbent; Liu Hongyang since 14 July 2015
- Inaugural holder: Shao Guanfu
- Formation: September 2002; 24 years ago

The ambassador of China to East Timor is the official representative of the People's Republic of China to East Timor.

== List of representatives ==
| Diplomatic agrément/Diplomatic accreditation | Ambassador | Chinese language zh:中国驻东帝汶大使列表 | Observations | Premier of the People's Republic of China | President of East Timor | Term end |
|---|---|---|---|---|---|---|
| May 20, 2002 | | | On the day of independence of East Timor the governments in Dili and in Beijing and established diplomatic relations. | Zhu Rongji | Xanana Gusmão | |
| September 2002 | Shao Guanfu | 邵关福 | Chargé d'affaires | Zhu Rongji | Xanana Gusmão | August 16, 2002 |
| August 2002 | Shao Guanfu | 邵关福 | | Zhu Rongji | Xanana Gusmão | August 2004 |
| September 2004 | Chen Duqing | zh:陈笃庆 | | Wen Jiabao | Xanana Gusmão | March 2006 |
| March 2006 | Su Jian | 苏健 | | Wen Jiabao | Xanana Gusmão | May 2009 |
| May 2009 | Fu Yuancong | 傅元聪 | | Wen Jiabao | José Ramos-Horta | December 2011 |
| January 2012 | Tian Guangfeng | zh:田廣鳳 | | Wen Jiabao | José Ramos-Horta | June 2015 |
| July 14, 2015 | Liu Hongyang | 劉洪洋 | | Li Keqiang | Taur Matan Ruak | |

== See also ==
- China–East Timor relations
