= List of ambassadors of China to Montenegro =

Coordinates: 42.428102°N 19.253894°E

Chinese Ambassador to Montenegro
- Incumbent; Cui Zhiwei since 1 June 2014
- Inaugural holder: Li Manchang
- Formation: 1 February 2007; 19 years ago

The Chinese ambassador to Montenegro is the official representative of the People's Republic of China to Montenegro.

== List of representatives ==
Diplomatic agrément/Diplomatic accreditation	Ambassador	Chinese language zh:中国驻黑山大使列表	Observations	Premier of the People's Republic of China	Prime Minister of Montenegro	Term end
June 3, 2006			The Montenegrin Parliament declared the independence of Montenegro.	Wen Jiabao	Željko Šturanović	
February 1, 2007	Li Manchang	李满长		Wen Jiabao	Željko Šturanović	December 1, 2010
December 1, 2010	Zhi Zhaolin	zh:智昭林		Wen Jiabao	Milo Đukanović	June 1, 2014
June 1, 2014	Cui Zhiwei	崔志伟		Li Keqiang	Milo Đukanović	
