= List of ambassadors of China to Niue =

The Chinese ambassador to Niue is the official representative of the People's Republic of China to Niue.

== List of representatives ==
Name (English)	Name (Chinese)	Tenure begins	Tenure ends	Note
Zhang Limin	张利民	19 August 2008	19 September 2010	
Xu Jianguo	徐建国	19 September 2010	25 November 2013	
Wang Lutong	王鲁彤	25 November 2013	2 April 2018	
Wu Xi	吴玺	2 April 2018	8 January 2022	
Wang Xiaolong	王小龙	8 January 2022		

== See also ==
- China–Niue relations
