= List of ambassadors of China to Malawi =

The Chinese ambassador to Malawi is the official representative of the People's Republic of China to the Republic of Malawi.

== List of representatives ==
Name	Appointed	Terminated
Lin Songtian (林松添)	May 2008	August 2010
Pan Hejun (潘和钧)	August 2010	July 2014
Zhang Qingyang (张清洋)	July 2014	March 2016
Wang Shiting (王世廷)	March 2016	Incumbent

== See also ==
- Ambassadors of the People's Republic of China
