= List of ambassadors of China to Togo =

Coordinates: 6.129189°N 1.236341°E

Chinese Ambassador to Togo
- Inaugural holder: Yao Dingchen
- Formation: September 1960; 66 years ago

The Chinese ambassador to Togo is the official representative of the People's Republic of China to the Togolese Republic.

== List of representatives ==
Diplomatic agrément/Diplomatic accreditation	Ambassador	Chinese language zh:中国驻多哥大使列表	Observations	Premier of the People's Republic of China	List of presidents of Togo	Term end
April 27, 1960			The governments in Taipei and Lomé established diplomatic relations.	Chen Cheng	Sylvanus Olympio	
September 1960	Yao Dingchen	吴世英		Chen Cheng	Sylvanus Olympio	March 1962
March 1962	Chang Ping-chun	張平群		Chen Cheng	Sylvanus Olympio	January 1973
September 19, 1972			The governments in Beijing and Lomé established diplomatic relations.	Zhou Enlai	Gnassingbé Eyadéma	May 1974
April 1973	Wei Baoshan	zh:魏宝善	From 1973 to 1974 he was ambassador in Lomé.; From 1974 to 1981 he was Chinese ambassador to Cameroon.; From 1982 to 1986 he was Chinese ambassador to Argentina.	Zhou Enlai	Gnassingbé Eyadéma	May 1974
August 1974	Yue Xin	zh:岳欣	Yue Minyi: From 1965 to 1967 he was Chinese ambassador to Finland.; From 1974 to 1988 he was ambassador in Lomé.	Zhou Enlai	Gnassingbé Eyadéma	December 1980
June 1982	Jin Minsheng	zh:靳民生		Zhao Ziyang	Gnassingbé Eyadéma	May 1984
September 1985	Li Peiyi	zh:李培宜	From 1985 to 1990 he was ambassador to Lomé.; From 1990 to 1993 he was ambassador to Kinshasa Zaire.	Zhao Ziyang	Gnassingbé Eyadéma	February 1990
April 1990	Zhou Xianjiao	zh:周贤觉	From 1986 to 1990 he was ambassador to Central Africa.; From 1990 to 1993 he was ambassador to Lomé.; From 1993 to 1996 he was ambassador to Kinshasa Zaire.	Li Peng	Gnassingbé Eyadéma	November 1993
December 1993	Sun Kunshan	zh:孙昆山	From 1993 to 1997 he was ambassador to Lomé.; From 1998 to 2001 he was ambassador to Kinshasa.	Li Peng	Gnassingbé Eyadéma	October 1997
November 1997	Jiang Kang	zh:江康	From December 1991 to August 1995 he was ambassador to Burundi.; From 1997 to 1998 he was ambassador to Lomé.	Li Peng	Gnassingbé Eyadéma	December 1999
August 1999	Yin Yubiao	zh:尹玉标		Zhu Rongji	Gnassingbé Eyadéma	August 2002
August 2002	Zhang Shixian	zh:张史贤	From 2002 to 2007 he was ambassador to Lomé.; From March 2007 to April 2008 he was Chinese Ambassador to Algeria.	Zhu Rongji	Gnassingbé Eyadéma	February 2007
February 2007	Yang Min	zh:杨民	From 2007 to 2011 he was ambassador to Lomé.; From July 2013 to March 2016, he was Chinese ambassador to Madagascar.	Wen Jiabao	Faure Gnassingbé	January 2011
January 2011	Wang Zuofeng	zh:王作峰		Wen Jiabao	Faure Gnassingbé	November 2013
November 2013	Liu Yuxi	刘豫锡		Li Keqiang	Faure Gnassingbé	December 13, 2014

== See also ==
- China–Togo relations
