= Wu Sike =

Chinese diplomat (born 1946)

- 吴思科
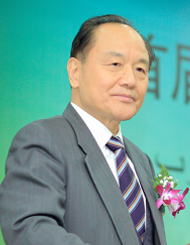

China's Special Envoy on the Middle East Issue
- In office March 2009 – 5 September 2014
- Preceded by: Sun Bigan
- Succeeded by: Gong Xiaosheng

Chinese Ambassador to Egypt
- In office June 2003 – November 2007
- Preceded by: Liu Xiaoming
- Succeeded by: Wu Chunhua

Chinese Ambassador to Saudi Arabia
- In office April 2000 – August 2003
- Preceded by: Yu Xingzhi
- Succeeded by: Wu Chunhua

Personal details
- Born: May 1946 (age 80) Yingshang, Anhui, China
- Spouse: Li Jianhua
- Education: Beijing International Studies University

Wu Sike (Chinese: 吴思科; pinyin: Wú Sīkē; born May 1946) is a senior diplomat of the People's Republic of China. He succeeded Sun Bigan in 2009 as China's Special Envoy on the Middle East Issue, serving in that position until 2014. Before assuming the office, he served successively as Chinese Ambassador to Saudi Arabia from 2000 to 2003 and Ambassador to Egypt from 2003 to 2007. Wu started to learn the Arabic language in 1965, when he was admitted to Beijing International Studies University.

In Wu's role as Special Envoy, he focused primarily on the Middle Eastern peace process. Wu's criticisms of Israel increased as a result of Israel's blockade of Gaza and its raiding of a flotilla carrying aid while the flotilla was in international waters.

Although the focus of the Special Envoy position continued to the peace process, Wu also sought to address the conflict in Syria and a number of other issues in the region. Near the end of his return, Wu remarked, "The stability of Iraq is key to peace and stability of the entire Middle East, as well as that of the world."
