= List of ambassadors of China to Nicaragua =

The Chinese ambassador to Nicaragua is the official representative of the People's Republic of China to the Republic of Nicaragua since 2021, after Nicaragua switched diplomatic ties from Taiwan to China.

Both countries had diplomatic ties between 1985 and 1990 before Nicaragua switched diplomatic ties from China to Taiwan.

== List of representatives ==
Diplomatic agrément/Diplomatic accreditation	Ambassador	Chinese language zh:中国驻尼加拉瓜大使列表	Observations	Premier of the People's Republic of China	President of Nicaragua	Term end
December 7, 1985			Governments in Managua and Beijing establish diplomatic relations.	Zhao Ziyang	Daniel Ortega	November 5, 1990
August 1, 1986	Yu Chengren	zh:俞成仁		Zhao Ziyang	Daniel Ortega	October 1, 1989
October 1, 1989	Huang Zhiliang	zh:黃志良		Li Peng	Daniel Ortega	November 1, 1990
