= List of ambassadors of China to Liberia =

Coordinates: 6.263660°N 10.723515°W

Chinese Ambassador to Liberia
- Incumbent; Zhang Yue since January 2014
- Inaugural holder: Tang Wu
- Formation: July 1960; 66 years ago

The Chinese ambassador to Liberia is the official representative of the People's Republic of China to the Republic of Liberia.

== History ==
The Republic of China (ROC) and Liberia recognised each other; from 1957 to 1977 and 1989 to 2003.

== List of representatives ==
Ambassador	Diplomatic agrément/Diplomatic accreditation	Chinese language zh:中国驻利比里亚大使列表	Notes	Premier of the People's Republic of China	President of Liberia	Term end
Tang Wu	July 1960		In 1965 he became ambassador to Santiago de Chile.	Chen Cheng	William Tubman	
Yang Chi-tseng	1965			Yen Chia-kan	William Tubman	1969
Yin Weiliang	1969			Yen Chia-kan	William Tubman	July 1977
Wang Rensan	July 1977	zh:王人三		Hua Guofeng	William R. Tolbert Jr.	January 1981
Liu Pu	June 1981	zh:刘溥 (外交官)		Zhao Ziyang	Samuel Doe	January 1985
Xiang Zhongpu	March 1985	zh:项钟圃		Zhao Ziyang	Samuel Doe	April 1988
Cao Yuanxin	July 1988	zh:曹元欣		Li Peng	Samuel Doe	October 1989
Kan Cheong Dunn	October 1989	鄧權昌		Yu Kuo-hwa	Samuel Doe	September 25, 1990
Xu Cinong	November 1993	zh:徐次农	Residence in Sierra Leone	Li Peng	Amos Sawyer	September 1994
Xu Cinong	October 1993	姓名		Li Peng	Amos Sawyer	September 1994
Xie Zhiquan	September 1994	zh:谢志衡		Li Peng	Amos Sawyer	September 1997
Xie Zhiheng	September 1994	zh:谢志衡		Li Peng	Charles Taylor (Liberian politician)	September 1997
	October 2003			Wen Jiabao	Charles Taylor (Liberian politician)	October 2003
Lin Songtian	March 2004	zh:林松添		Wen Jiabao	Ellen Johnson Sirleaf	August 2007
Zhou Yuxiao	August 2007	zh:周欲晓		Wen Jiabao	Ellen Johnson Sirleaf	March 2011
Zhao Jianhua (PRC diplomat)	March 2011	zh:赵鉴华	Concurrently	Wen Jiabao	Ellen Johnson Sirleaf	December 2013
Zhang Yue (PRC diplomat)	January 2014	張越		Li Keqiang	Ellen Johnson Sirleaf	February 2018
Fu Jijun	February 2018	付吉军				February 2020
Ren Yisheng	July 2020	任义生				
