= List of ambassadors of China to the Maldives =

Chinese ambassadors

Coordinates: 4.175034°N 73.510148°E

Ambassador of China to the Maldives
- Incumbent; Wang Lixin since September 6, 2021
- Inaugural holder: Sze Sung-hsi
- Formation: July 1, 1966
- Website: http://mv.china-embassy.org

The Chinese ambassador in Malé is the official representative of the Government in Beijing to the Government of the Maldives.

== List of representatives ==
Diplomatic agrément/Diplomatic accreditation	ambassador	Chinese language zh:中国驻马尔代夫大使列表	Observations	Premier of the People's Republic of China	President of the Maldives	Term end
July 26, 1965			Independence of the Maldives from the United Kingdom.	Yen Chia-kan	Muhammad Fareed Didi	
July 1, 1966	Sze Sung-hsi	zh:斯頌熙	Taiwan opened in Malé an embassy headed by Sze Sung-hsi, who was at this time the only resident ambassador in Malé.	Yen Chia-kan	Muhammad Fareed Didi	April 1, 1967
August 1, 1968	Liu Hsin-yu	刘新玉	former ambassador to Botswana.	Yen Chia-kan	Muhammad Fareed Didi	August 1, 1969
August 1, 1969	Chang Chung-jen (taiwanese diplomat)	张仲仁		Yen Chia-kan	Ibrahim Nasir	July 1, 1972
October 14, 1972			The governments in Beijing and Malé establish diplomatic relations.	Zhou Enlai	Ibrahim Nasir	
July 1, 1970	Ma Ziqing	zh:马子卿	with residence in Colombo (Sri Lanka).: From June 1965 to December 1966 he was ambassador in Mali; From July 1970 to February 1973 he was ambassador in Colombo Ceylon / Sri Lanka"	Zhou Enlai	Ibrahim Nasir	February 1, 1973
March 1, 1973	Huang Mingda (PRC diplomat)	zh:黄明达	with residence in Colombo (Sri Lanka).: From March 1973 to May 1977 he was ambassador in Colombo Sri Lanka.; September 1977 to October 1979 he was ambassador in Kabul, Afghanistan.; From July 1982 to June 1985 he was ambassador in Myanmar.	Zhou Enlai	Ibrahim Nasir	May 1, 1977
September 1, 1977	Sun Shengwei	zh:孙盛渭	with residence in Colombo (Sri Lanka).(*May 1917 in Shandong ): From August 1971 to May 1977 he was ambassador in Kuwait; From September 1977 to January 1981 he was ambassador in Sri Lanka; From May 1981 to January 1985 he was ambassador in Finland.	Hua Guofeng	Ibrahim Nasir	January 1, 1981
March 1, 1981	Gao E	zh:高鄂	with residence in Colombo (Sri Lanka).	Zhao Ziyang	Maumoon Abdul Gayoom	October 1, 1984
November 1, 1984	Zhou Shanyan	zh:周善延	with residence in Colombo (Sri Lanka).	Zhao Ziyang	Maumoon Abdul Gayoom	June 1, 1987
September 1, 1987	Zhang Ruijie	zh:张瑞杰	with residence in Colombo (Sri Lanka).: From July 1985 to June 1987he was ambassador in Ethiopia; From September 1987 to August 1991 he was ambassador in Sri Lanka"	Li Peng	Maumoon Abdul Gayoom	August 1, 1991
September 1, 1991	Zhang Lian	zh:张联	with residence in Colombo (Sri Lanka).	Li Peng	Maumoon Abdul Gayoom	December 1, 1993
December 1, 1993	Zhang Chengli	zh:张成礼	with residence in Colombo (Sri Lanka).(*1993): From September 1993 to February 1995 he was ambassador in Sri Lanka.; From April 1995 to January 1999 he was ambassador in Pakistan.	Li Peng	Maumoon Abdul Gayoom	February 1, 1995
March 1, 1995	Chen Defu	zh:陈德福	with residence in Colombo (Sri Lanka).	Li Peng	Maumoon Abdul Gayoom	May 1, 1999
June 1, 1999	Zhang Yun (PRC diplomat)	zh:张云 (外交官)	with residence in Colombo (Sri Lanka).: From May 2004 to February 2007 he was ambassador in Singapore; From June 1999 to June 2000 he was ambassador in Sri Lanka"	Zhu Rongji	Maumoon Abdul Gayoom	June 1, 2000
July 1, 2000	Jiang Qinzheng	zh:江勤政	with residence in Colombo (Sri Lanka).	Zhu Rongji	Maumoon Abdul Gayoom	February 1, 2003
April 1, 2003	Sun Guoxiang	zh:孙国祥	with residence in Colombo (Sri Lanka).: From April 2003 to November 2006 he was ambassador in Sri Lanka; From November 2006 to September 2008 he was ambassador in Ankara (Turkey).; From November 2008 to September 2011 Ambassador in Hanoi (Vietnam).; From 2011 to December 2014 Chinese Consul General in New York	Wen Jiabao	Maumoon Abdul Gayoom	November 1, 2006
December 1, 2006	Ye Dabo	zh:叶大波	with residence in Colombo (Sri Lanka).: From May 2004 to October 2006 he was ambassador in Dominica.; From December 2006 to February 2009 he was ambassador in Sri Lanka; From January 2009 to September 2010 he was ambassador in Myanmar.	Wen Jiabao	Maumoon Abdul Gayoom	January 1, 2009
January 1, 2009	Yang Xiuping	zh:杨秀萍	From February 2009 to June 2012 he was ambassador in Colombo Sri Lanka his coaccredition in Malé is disputed.; From March 2002 to January 2005 he was ambassador in Lithuania.; Since July 2012 he is permanent representative at the Association of Southeast Asian Nations.	Wen Jiabao	Mohamed Nasheed	October 1, 2011
October 1, 2011	Yu Hongyao	zh:余洪耀	From August 2007 to January 2011 he was ambassador in Mongolia.; From October 2011 to December 2013 he was ambassador with residence in Malé Maldives	Wen Jiabao	Mohamed Nasheed	December 1, 2013
December 1, 2013	Wang Fukang	王福康		Li Keqiang	Mohamed Nasheed	
August 28, 2017	Zhang Lizhong			Li Keqiang	Abdulla Yameen	September 6, 2021
September 6, 2021	Wang Lixin			Li Keqiang	Ibrahim Mohamed Solih	
