= List of ambassadors of China to Rwanda =

Coordinates: 1.954102°S 30.061487°E

Chinese Ambassador to Rwanda
- Incumbent; Rao Hongwei since 1 January 2017
- Inaugural holder: Ting Mao-shih
- Formation: 1 August 1962; 64 years ago

The Chinese ambassador to Rwanda is the official representative of the People's Republic of China to the Republic of Rwanda.

== List of representatives ==
Diplomatic agrément/Diplomatic accreditation	Ambassador	Chinese language zh:中国驻卢旺达大使列表	Observations	List of presidents of Rwanda	Premier of the People's Republic of China	Term end
August 1, 1962	Ting Mao-shih	zh:丁懋时	Chargé d'affaires	Grégoire Kayibanda	Chen Cheng	September 15, 1965
September 15, 1965	Ting Mao-shih	zh:丁懋时		Grégoire Kayibanda	Yen Chia-kan	August 15, 1967
August 4, 1967	Tsu-hsun Shen	沈祖浔		Grégoire Kayibanda	Yen Chia-kan	
December 26, 1969	Argon Kuan	zh:管传埰	The former secretary of the Foreign Ministry, was named ambassador to Rwanda to succeed Shen Tsu-shun.	Grégoire Kayibanda	Yen Chia-kan	September 20, 1972
November 12, 1972			The governments in Kigali and Beijing established diplomatic relations.	Grégoire Kayibanda	Zhou Enlai	
June 1, 1972	Huang Shixie	zh:黄世燮		Grégoire Kayibanda	Zhou Enlai	August 1, 1977
September 1, 1977	Yue Liang	zh:岳良		Juvénal Habyarimana	Hua Guofeng	June 1, 1981
May 1, 1982	Zhao Jin (PRC diplomat)	zh:赵禁		Juvénal Habyarimana	Zhao Ziyang	September 1, 1984
January 1, 1985	An Fengshi	安峰石		Juvénal Habyarimana	Zhao Ziyang	April 1, 1989
May 1, 1989	Tian Yimin	田逸民		Juvénal Habyarimana	Li Peng	May 1993
June 1, 1993	Huang Shejiao	zh:黄舍骄		Juvénal Habyarimana	Li Peng	October 1, 1996
December 1, 1996	He Jincai	何金才		Pasteur Bizimungu	Li Peng	October 1, 1999
November 1, 1999	Shen Jiangkuan	沈江宽		Pasteur Bizimungu	Zhu Rongji	November 1, 2003
November 1, 2003	Qi Deen	戚德恩		Paul Kagame	Wen Jiabao	July 1, 2007
November 1, 2007	Sun Shuzhong	孙树忠		Paul Kagame	Wen Jiabao	November 1, 2010
December 1, 2010	Shu Zhan (PRC diplomat)	舒展		Paul Kagame	Wen Jiabao	July 1, 2013
July 1, 2013	Shen Yongxiang	zh:沈永祥		Paul Kagame	Li Keqiang	December 1, 2015
December 1, 2015	Pan Hejun	潘和鈞		Paul Kagame	Li Keqiang	January 1, 2017
January 1, 2017	Rao Hongwei	饶宏伟		Paul Kagame	Li Keqiang	

== See also ==
- China–Rwanda relations
