= China–Liechtenstein relations =

- China: Liechtenstein

China–Liechtenstein relations refers to the diplomatic relations between China and Liechtenstein. Liechtenstein is currently the only country to which China sends a consul general as its diplomatic representative.

== History ==
In January 1951, the Swiss Embassy in China exchanged notes with the Ministry of Foreign Affairs of the People's Republic of China. In accordance with the agreement reached between Switzerland and Liechtenstein in 1919, the Swiss Embassy in China represented Liechtenstein's interests in China.

On August 27, 1987, Cai Fangbo, the Chinese ambassador to Switzerland, paid a courtesy call on Prince Henry, the Liechtenstein ambassador to Switzerland. Prince Henry stated that China and Liechtenstein had mutually recognized each other and welcomed the establishment of a Chinese consulate in Liechtenstein. In September 1988, the two embassies in Switzerland exchanged notes confirming that September 14, 1950, the date of the establishment of diplomatic relations between China and Switzerland, was the date of the establishment of diplomatic relations between China and Liechtenstein.

On August 18, 1988, the Chinese Embassy in Switzerland sent a note to the Liechtenstein Embassy in Switzerland, stating that the Chinese government intended to appoint Consul General Sin Futan, the Consul General in Zurich, as Consul General in Liechtenstein. On September 5, the Liechtenstein Embassy in Switzerland replied to the Chinese Embassy, agreeing to appoint Sin Futan as Consul General of China in Liechtenstein. On September 14, Liechtenstein issued a consular certificate to Sin Futan.

== High-level mutual visits ==
The Chinese delegations to Liechtenstein included: Zhou Nan, Vice Minister of Foreign Affairs (1988); Wang Yingfan, Vice Minister of Foreign Affairs (1997); Zeng Peiyan, Vice Premier (visited Liechtenstein in January 2008 during the World Economic Forum in Davos); Fu Ying, Vice Minister of Foreign Affairs (June 2011); and Liu Haixing, assistant minister of foreign affairs (January 2017).

Liechtenstein's visiting dignitaries include: Foreign Minister Vili (visited China in September 1995 to attend the Fourth World Conference on Women); Prince Hans-Adam II (visited China in October 2002, October 2007, September 2009, and October 2012, all private visits); Princess Nora. IOC member (visited China in August 2008 to attend the opening ceremony of the Beijing Olympics); and government member and minister of foreign affairs, Culture, and Justice Flick (visited China in May 2010 to attend the Global Women's Summit and attended the Shanghai World Expo); Crown Prince Regent Alois (visited China in September 2010 to attend the Liechtenstein National Pavilion Day event at the Shanghai World Expo, and in November 2013 to attend the opening ceremony of the Liechtenstein Royal Collection Exhibition); Prime Minister Kützl (visited China in September 2010 to attend the Liechtenstein National Pavilion Day event at the Shanghai World Expo); Deputy Prime Minister Meyer (visited China to attend the closing ceremony of the Shanghai World Expo and to visit China); Prince Constantine (November 2016).

== Trade and economic relations ==
Trade relations between China and Switzerland began in the 1950s. The China–Switzerland Free Trade Agreement, which came into effect on 1 July 2014, automatically applies to trade in goods between China and Liechtenstein. In 2022, bilateral trade between China and Switzerland amounted to US$260 million, a year-on-year decrease of 1.1%. China's exports amounted to US$60 million, a year-on-year decrease of 9.0%; imports amounted to US$190 million, a year-on-year increase of 1.8%.
