= List of ambassadors of China to the Federated States of Micronesia =

Coordinates: 6.920255°N 158.161961°E

Chinese Ambassador to the Federated States of Micronesia
- Incumbent; Li Jie since January 2015
- Inaugural holder: Zhang Zai
- Formation: October 1989; 36 years ago

The Chinese ambassador to the Federated States of Micronesia is the official representative of the People's Republic of China to the Federated States of Micronesia.

== List of representatives ==
Diplomatic agrément/Diplomatic accreditation	Ambassador	Chinese language zh:中国驻密克罗尼西亚大使列表	Observations	Premier of the People's Republic of China	President of the Federated States of Micronesia	Term end
September 11, 1989			The governments in Palikir and Beijing established diplomatic relations.	Li Peng	John Haglelgam	
October 1989	Zhang Zai (PRC diplomat)	zh:张再	Concurrently with residence in Canberra (Australia). (*1928 ),	Li Peng	John Haglelgam	June 1990
September 11, 1990	Shi Chunlai	zh:石春来	Concurrently with residence in Canberra Australia.	Li Peng	John Haglelgam	June 1991
June 1991	Li Qinping	李钦平		Li Peng	Bailey Olter	January 1994
February 1994	Chen Yongcheng	陈永成		Li Peng	Bailey Olter	August 1997
September 1997	Xu Jun (PRC diplomat)	许军		Li Peng	Leo Falcam	March 2002
April 2002	Zhang Binhua	zh:张滨华	From December 1998 to March 2002 he was ambassador to Tonga.; From April 2002 to June 2004 he was ambassador to Palikir (Micronesia).	Zhu Rongji	Leo Falcam	June 2004
June 2004	Yang Qiang (PRC diplomat)	杨强 (外交官)		Wen Jiabao	Joseph J. Urusemal	October 2006
October 2006	Liu Fei (PRC diplomat)	刘菲		Wen Jiabao	Joseph J. Urusemal	July 2009
August 2009	Zhang Weidong	张卫东		Wen Jiabao	Manny Mori	July 2012
July 2012	Zhang Lianyun	张连云		Wen Jiabao	Manny Mori	December 2014
January 2015	Li Jie (PRC diplomat)	李杰		Li Keqiang	Manny Mori	

- China–Federated States of Micronesia relations
