= List of ambassadors of China to Slovakia =

The Chinese ambassador to Slovakia is the official representative of the People's Republic of China to Slovakia.

== List of representatives ==
Name (English)	Name (Chinese)	Tenure begins	Tenure ends	Note
Qi Guofu	齐国辅	October 1992	31 December 1992	Consul
Qi Guofu	齐国辅	1 January 1993	March 1993	Chargé d'affaires
Tang Zhanqing	唐湛清	March 1993	January 1996	
Tao Miaofa	陶苗发	May 1996	November 1999	
Yuan Guisen	苑桂森	December 1999	July 2003	
Huang Zhongpo	黄忠坡	August 2003	May 2008	
Chen Jianfu	陈建福	May 2008	August 2010	
Gu Ziping	顾子平	August 2010	March 2013	
Pan Weifang	潘伟芳	March 2013	October 2015	
Lin Lin	林琳	November 2015	December 2019	
Sun Lijie	孙立杰	February 2020		

== See also ==
- China–Slovakia relations
- Slovakia–Taiwan relations
