= List of ambassadors of China to Chad =

The ambassador of China to Chad is the official representative of the People's Republic of China to Chad.

== List of representatives ==
=== Republic of China (1962–1972) ===
Name (English)	Name (Chinese)	Tenure begins	Tenure ends	Note
Shi Youxin	史悠鑫	23 March 1962	17 October 1962	
Xu Nai	许鼐	25 August 1962	7 August 1965	
Feng Yaozeng	冯燿曾	25 June 1965	27 December 1972	

=== People's Republic of China (1973–1997) ===
Name (English)	Name (Chinese)	Tenure begins	Tenure ends	Note
Luo Jin	罗进	1973	May 1973	
Wang Rensan	王人三	May 1973	May 1977	
Miao Jiurui	苗九锐	September 1977	February 1981	
Yang Yongrui	杨永瑞	December 1985	August 1988	
Zhou Zhendong	周振东	September 1988	August 1992	
Guo Tianmin	郭天民	August 1992	November 1995	
Gao Ruming	高如铭	November 1995	August 1997	

=== Republic of China (1997–2006) ===
Name (English)	Name (Chinese)	Tenure begins	Tenure ends	Note
Qiu Zhongren	邱仲仁	9 October 1997	12 July 2001	
Zheng Xin	郑欣	5 June 2001	8 February 2006	
Song Zizheng	宋子正	4 November 2005	6 August 2006	

=== People's Republic of China (2006–2023) ===
Name (English)	Name (Chinese)	Tenure begins	Tenure ends	Note
Chen Guangguo	陈光国	2006	December 2006	
Wang Yingwu	王英武	December 2006	July 2009	
Yang Guangyu	杨广玉	August 2009	25 August 2012	
Hu Zhiqiang	胡志强	29 October 2012	October 2015	
Wu Jie	吴杰	6 June 2016	July 2018	
Li Jinjin	李津津	8 August 2018	11 March 2023	

== See also ==
- Chad–China relations
