= List of ambassadors of China to Cuba =

The ambassador of China to Cuba is the official representative of the People's Republic of China to Cuba.

== List of representatives ==
Name (English)	Name (Chinese)	Tenure begins	Tenure ends	Note
Shen Jian	申健	9 November 1960	January 1964	
Wang Youping	王幼平	4 January 1964	January 1967	
Li Shanyi	李善一	January 1967	December 1970	
Zhang Dequn	张德群	December 1970	18 February 1975	
Li Shanyi	李善一	June 1975	20 April 1979	
Wang Zhanyuan	王占元	August 1979	7 August 1983	
Wang Jin	王晋	December 1983	26 October 1986	
Zhang Yongming	张永明	November 1986	2 December 1986	
Tang Yonggui	汤永贵	April 1987	August 1990	
Chen Jiuchang	陈久长	18 August 1990	August 1993	
Xu Yicong	徐贻聪	10 September 1993	December 1995	
Liu Peigen	刘培根	15 December 1995	7 February 1999	
Wang Chengjia	王成家	12 March 1999	June 2001	
Wang Zhiquan	王治权	10 July 2001	February 2004	
Li Lianfu	李连甫	12 March 2004	October 2005	
Zhao Rongxian	赵荣宪	27 October 2005	December 2009	
Liu Yuqin	刘玉琴	10 February 2010	January 2012	
Zhang Tuo	张拓	January 2012	October 2016	
Chen Xi	陈曦	October 2016	June 2021	
Ma Hui	马辉	July 2021	5 July 2024	
Hua Xin	华昕	5 July 2024	Incumbent	

== See also ==
- China–Cuba relations
