= List of ambassadors of China to Oman =

Coordinates: 23.605297°N 58.431785°E

Chinese Ambassador to Oman
- Incumbent; Yu Fulong since October 2014
- Inaugural holder: Yuan Lulin
- Formation: April 1979; 47 years ago

The Chinese ambassador to Oman is the official representative of the People's Republic of China to the Sultanate of Oman.

== List of representatives ==
Diplomatic agrément/Diplomatic accreditation	Ambassador	Chinese language zh:中国驻阿曼大使列表	Observations	Premier of the People's Republic of China	List of rulers of Oman	Term end
May 25, 1978			The governments in Beijing and Muscat, Oman established diplomatic relations.	Hua Guofeng	Qaboos bin Said al Said	
April 1979	Yuan Lulin	zh:袁鲁林	(*1921)	Hua Guofeng	Qaboos bin Said al Said	March 1985
April 1985	Guan Zihuai	zh:管子怀	(*1934): From April 1985 to June 1987 he was ambassador in Muscat, Oman.; From March 1987 to November 1993 he was ambassador in Kuwait City.; From July 1989 to September 1990 he was ambassador in Bahrain.	Zhao Ziyang	Qaboos bin Said al Said	June 1987
March 1987	Zang Shixong	zh:臧士雄		Li Peng	Qaboos bin Said al Said	October 1992
July 1992	Zhang Zhixiang (PRC diplomat)	zh:张志祥 (外交官)	(*September 1938 in Shanghai): From July 1992 to November 1996 he was ambassador in Muscat, Oman.; From August 1996 to August 2001 he was ambassador in Kuwait City.	Li Peng	Qaboos bin Said al Said	November 1996
August 1996	Wang Xiaozhuang	zh:王小庄	(1939 – 2013): From November 1992 to November 1996 he was ambassador in Bahrain.; From August 1996 to July 2000 he was ambassador in Muscat, Oman	Li Peng	Qaboos bin Said al Said	July 2000
April 2000	Zhao Xuechang	zh:赵学昌		Zhu Rongji	Qaboos bin Said al Said	February 2003
August 2002	Deng Shaoqin	zh:邓绍勤	*From April 1998 to January 2002 he was ambassador in Khartoum (Sudan).: From August 2002 to October 2006 he was ambassador in Muscat, Oman.	Zhu Rongji	Qaboos bin Said al Said	October 2006
November 2006	Pan Weifang	zh:潘伟芳	(*February 1959 ): From November 2006 to December 2010 he was ambassador in Muscat, Oman.; From March 2013 to December 2015 he was ambassador in Bratislava (Slovakia).; Since January 2016 he is ambassador in Amman (Jordan).	Wen Jiabao	Qaboos bin Said al Said	November 2010
December 2010	Wu Jiuhong	zh:吴久洪	From February 2000 to November 2002 he was Director of the Office to the Palestinian National Authority in Islamabad.; From December 2002 to May 2008 he was ambassador in Kuwait City.; From December 2010 to October 2014 he was Ambassador in Muscat, Oman.	Wen Jiabao	Qaboos bin Said al Said	October 2014
October 2014	Yu Fulong	于福龙		Li Keqiang	Qaboos bin Said al Said	

|- |2020 |Li Lingbing | | |Li Keqiang |Qaboos bin Said al Said | |}
