= List of ambassadors of China to Slovenia =

The Chinese ambassador to Slovenia is the official representative of the People's Republic of China to Slovenia.

== List of representatives ==
Name (English)	Name (Chinese)	Tenure begins	Tenure ends	Note
Gong Liefu	龚猎夫	August 1992	December 1992	Chargé d'affaires
Lu Peixin	鲁培新	December 1992	July 1997	
Wu Junfeng	吴俊峰	August 1997	July 2000	
Yang Hexiong	杨鹤熊	August 2000	April 2002	
Xu Jian	徐坚	May 2002	August 2003	
Wang Fuyuan	王富元	February 2004	March 2007	
Zhi Zhaolin	智昭林	April 2007	May 2010	
Sun Rongmin	孙荣民	May 2010	February 2012	
Zhang Xianyi	张宪一	March 2012	March 2015	
Ye Hao	叶皓	March 2015	November 2018	
Wang Shunqing	王顺卿	December 2018		

== See also ==
- China–Slovenia relations
