= List of ambassadors of China to Turkmenistan =

Coordinates: 37.888658°N 58.353265°E

Chinese Ambassador to Turkmenistan
- Inaugural holder: Cheng Zhensheng
- Formation: September 1992; 34 years ago

The Chinese ambassador to Turkmenistan is the official representative of the People's Republic of China to Turkmenistan.

== List of representatives ==
Diplomatic agrément/Diplomatic accreditation	Ambassador	Chinese language zh:中国驻土库曼斯坦大使列表	Observations	Premier of the People's Republic of China	President of Turkmenistan	Term end
June 1992			The governments in Ashgabat and Beijing established diplomatic relations.	Li Peng	Saparmurat Niyazov	
September 1992	Cheng Zhensheng	zh:程振声	(February 1935 - 14 April 2017), Chaoyang County, Provinz Liaoning, Volksrepublik China Politiker.	Li Peng	Saparmurat Niyazov	April 1996
May 1996	Yin Songling	zh:殷松龄	(1936 -), Shanxi Taiyuan	Li Peng	Saparmurat Niyazov	August 1998
August 1998	Gong Liefu	龚猎夫		Zhu Rongji	Saparmurat Niyazov	February 2001
March 2001	Gao Yusheng	zh:高玉生	*From March 2001 - August 2003 he was Chinese Ambassador to Turkmenistan. *From October 2003 - October 2005 he was Chinese Ambassador to Uzbekistan. *From November 2005 - January 2007 he was Chinese Ambassador to Ukraine.	Zhu Rongji	Saparmurat Niyazov	August 2003
September 2003	Lu Guicheng	鲁桂成		Wen Jiabao	Saparmurat Niyazov	September 2008
September 2008	Wu Hongbin	吴虹滨		Wen Jiabao	Gurbanguly Berdimuhamedow	March 2011
April 2011	Xiao Qinghua	肖清华		Wen Jiabao	Gurbanguly Berdimuhamedow	August 2016
October 2016	Sun Weidong	孙炜东		Li Keqiang	Gurbanguly Berdimuhamedow	March 2023
