= List of ambassadors of China to Sierra Leone =

Coordinates: 8.460980°N 13.261460°W

Chinese Ambassador to Sierra Leone
- Incumbent; Wu Peng since November 2016
- Inaugural holder: Liu Hoh-tu
- Formation: September 1964; 62 years ago

The Chinese ambassador to Sierra Leone is the official representative of the People's Republic of China to the Republic of Sierra Leone.

== History ==
From 28 September 1963 to 20 August 1971, the Republic of China and Sierra Leone maintained diplomatic relations.

On 29 July 1971, the People's Republic of China and Sierra Leone established diplomatic relations.

== List of representatives ==
Diplomatic agrément/Diplomatic accreditation	Ambassador	Chinese language zh:中国驻塞拉利昂大使列表	Observations	Premier of the People's Republic of China	List of heads of government of Sierra Leone	Term end
September 1964	Liu Hoh-tu	zh:柳鹤图		Yen Chia-kan	Albert Margai	August 1971
July 29, 1971			The governments in Beijing and Freetown established diplomatic relations.	Zhou Enlai	Siaka Stevens	
March 1972	Zhao Zhengyi	zh:赵政一		Zhou Enlai	Siaka Stevens	March 1975
July 1975	Tian Ping	zh:宗克文		Zhou Enlai	Siaka Stevens	July 1978
November 1978	Zong Kewen	zh:田平		Hua Guofeng	Siaka Stevens	November 1982
March 1983	Tian ding	zh:田丁		Zhao Ziyang	Siaka Stevens	March 1985
August 1985	Luo Jiahuan	zh:罗嘉驩		Zhao Ziyang	Siaka Stevens	August 1988
September 1988	Gao Jianzhong	zh:高建中		Li Peng	Joseph Saidu Momoh	April 1993
May 1993	Xu Cinong	zh:徐次农		Li Peng	Valentine Strasser	November 1995
November 1995	Qu wenming	zh:瞿文明		Li Peng	Valentine Strasser	June 1997
October 1998	Yu Wuzhen	zh:于武真		Zhu Rongji	Ahmad Tejan Kabbah	October 2001
November 2001	Fan Guijin	zh:樊桂金		Zhu Rongji	Ahmad Tejan Kabbah	August 2004
September 2004	Cheng Wenjv	zh:程文举		Wen Jiabao	Ahmad Tejan Kabbah	July 2008
August 2008	Qiu Shaofang	zh:邱绍芳		Wen Jiabao	Ernest Bai Koroma	November 2010
December 2010	Kuang Weilin	zh:旷伟霖		Wen Jiabao	Ernest Bai Koroma	December 2013
December 2013	Zhao Yanbo	赵彦博		Li Keqiang	Ernest Bai Koroma	
November 2016	Wu Peng (PRC diplomat)	吴鹏		Li Keqiang	Ernest Bai Koroma	
