= List of ambassadors of China to Ivory Coast =

The ambassador of China to the Republic of Côte d'Ivoire is the official representative of the People's Republic of China to the Republic of Côte d'Ivoire.

== List of representatives ==
Name (English)	Name (Chinese)	Tenure begins	Tenure ends	Note
Xing Geng	邢耿	August 1983	February 1984	Chargé d'affaires
Zhu Chengcai	祝成才	February 1984	April 1988	
Cai Zaidu	蔡再杜	May 1988	August 1993	
Liu Lide	刘立德	September 1993	March 1999	
Zhao Baozhen	赵宝珍	April 1999	November 2003	
Ma Zhixue	马志学	November 2003	July 2007	
Wei Wenhua	魏文华	November 2007	January 20125	
Zhang Guoqing	张国庆	February 2012	26 June 2015	
Tang Weibin	唐卫斌	June 2015	April 2019	
Wan Li	万黎	May 2019	December 2022	

== See also ==
- China–Ivory Coast relations
