= List of ambassadors of China to Kuwait =

The ambassador of China to Kuwait is the official representative of the People's Republic of China to Kuwait.

== List of representatives ==
Name (English)	Name (Chinese)	Tenure begins	Tenure ends	Note
Yuan Shilian	原士谦	May 1971	August 1971	Chargé d'affaires
Ding Shengwei	孙盛渭	August 1971	28 May 1977	
Ding Hao	丁浩	September 1977	November 1980	
Lu Ming	鲁明	April 1981	4 July 1983	
Yang Fuchang	杨福昌	January 1984	June 1987	
Guan Zihuai	管子怀	September 1987	November 1993	
Wang Jingqi	王景祺	December 1993	November 1996	
Zhang Zhixiang	张志祥	December 1996	August 2001	
Zeng Xuyong	曾序勇	September 2001	March 2003	
Wu Jiuhong	吴久洪	May 2003	May 2008	
Huang Jiemin	黄杰民	June 2008	January 2012	
Cui Jianchun	崔建春	February 2012	April 2015	
Wang Di	王镝	July 2015	15 October 2018	
Li Minggang	李名刚	December 2018	March 2022	
Zhang Jianwei	张建卫	May 2022		

== See also ==
- China–Kuwait relations
