= List of ambassadors of China to Honduras =

Official representatives of China in Honduras

The ambassador of China to Honduras is the official representative of the People's Republic of China to the Republic of Honduras.

== List of representatives ==
=== People's Republic of China (2023–present) ===
Name (English)	Name (Chinese)	Tenure begins	Tenure ends	Note
Yu Bo	于波	April 4, 2023	August 2023	Chargé d'affaires
Yu Bo	于波	August 2023		

== See also ==
- China–Honduras relations
