= List of ambassadors of China to Dominica =

The ambassador of China to Dominica is the official representative of the People's Republic of China to Dominica.

== List of representatives ==
Name (English)	Name (Chinese)	Tenure begins	Tenure ends	Note
Ye Dabo	叶大波	12 May 2004	October 2006	
Deng Boqing	邓波清	27 August 2006	29 April 2010	
Wang Zonglai	王宗来	28 October 2010	25 October 2013	
Li Jiangning	李江宁	25 October 2013	2 July 2016	
Lu Kun	卢坤	2 July 2016	17 October 2020	
Lin Xianjiang	林先江	November 2021		

== See also ==
- China–Dominica relations
