= List of ambassadors of China to Colombia =

The ambassador of China to Colombia is the official representative of the People's Republic of China to Colombia.

== List of representatives ==
Name (English)	Name (Chinese)	Tenure begins	Tenure ends	Note
Xu Jiasan	许甲三	June 1980	December 1980	
Zhao Zhengyi	赵政一	December 1980	January 1983	
Tao Dazhao	陶大钊	September 1983	May 1985	
Li Guoxin	李国新	May 1985	August 1988	
Wang Yusheng	王嵎生	September 1988	February 1993	
Yu Chengren	俞成仁	March 1993	May 1996	
Huang Shikang	黄士康	June 1996	January 2000	
Ju Yijie	居一杰	February 2000	May 2003	
Wu Changsheng	吴长胜	July 2003	February 2007	
Li Changhua	李长华	March 2007	July 2009	
Gao Zhengyue	高正月	August 2009	September 2011	
Wang Xiaoyuan	汪晓源	September 2011	December 2015	
Li Nianping	李念平	December 2015	August 2019	
Lan Hu	蓝虎	January 2020		

== See also ==
- China–Colombia relations
