= List of ambassadors of China to the Democratic Republic of the Congo =

Ambassador of China to the Democratic Republic of the Congo
- Incumbent; Zhu Jing since November 2019
- Inaugural holder: Zhang Tong
- Formation: July 1961; 65 years ago

The ambassador of China to the Democratic Republic of the Congo is the official representative of the People's Republic of China to the Democratic Republic of the Congo.

== List of representatives ==
Designated/accredited	Ambassador	Observations	Premier of the People's Republic of China	Prime Minister of the Democratic Republic of the Congo	Term end
July 1961	Zhang Tong		Zhou Enlai	Joseph Iléo	September 1961
January 1973	Gong Dafei		Zhou Enlai	Mpinga Kasenda	July 1978
September 1978	Zhou Boping		Hua Guofeng	Mpinga Kasenda	January 1982
March 1982	Li Shanyi		Zhao Ziyang	N'singa Udjuu Ongwabeki Untubu	March 1985
April 1985	An Guozhang		Zhao Ziyang	Léon Kengo wa Dondo	January 1990
April 1990	Li Peiyi		Li Peng	Léon Kengo wa Dondo	November 1993
December 1993	Zhou Xianjue		Li Peng	Faustin Birindwa	November 1996
December 1996	Huang Shenjiao		Li Peng	Léon Kengo wa Dondo	December 1997
June 1998	Sun Kunshan		Zhu Rongji	Laurent-Désiré Kabila	February 2001
March 2001	Cui Yongqian		Zhu Rongji	Joseph Kabila	March 2005
April 2005	Fan Zhenshui		Wen Jiabao	Joseph Kabila	February 2007
March 2007	Wu Zexian		Wen Jiabao	Antoine Gizenga	November 2010
December 2010	Wang Yingwu		Wen Jiabao	Adolphe Muzito	October 2014
December 2014	Wang Tongqing		Li Keqiang	Augustin Matata Ponyo	July 2019
July 2019	Zhu Jing		Li Keqiang	Sylvestre Ilunga	
