= List of ambassadors of China to Ghana =

The ambassador of China to Ghana is the official representative of the People's Republic of China to Ghana.

== List of representatives ==
| Name (English) | Name (Chinese) | Tenure begins | Tenure ends | Note |
|---|---|---|---|---|
| Huang Hua | 黄华 | 15 August 1960 | 16 December 1965 | |
| Chen Chu | 陈楚 | 16 December 1965 | Not in office | |
| Huang Shixie | 黄世燮 | 20 December 1965 | 5 November 1966 | |
| Wei Yongqing | 卫永清 | 6 July 1972 | 19 September 1972 | |
| Ke Hua | 柯华 | 19 September 1972 | August 1974 | |
| Yang Keming | 杨克明 | 7 September 1974 | 25 February 1979 | |
| Jia Huaiji | 贾怀济 | 29 November 1979 | 21 March 1985 | |
| Gu Xin'er | 顾欣尔 | 21 March 1985 | 8 November 1988 | |
| Cui Jie | 崔杰 | 8 November 1988 | 29 June 1991 | |
| Guo Jing'an | 郭靖安 | 29 June 1991 | 2 July 1993 | |
| Zhang Dezheng | 张德政 | 2 July 1993 | 30 December 1996 | |
| Li Zupei | 李祖沛 | 30 December 1996 | 28 June 1999 | |
| Lü Yongshou | 吕永寿 | 30 August 1999 | 26 April 2003 | |
| Zhang Keyuan | 张克远 | 26 April 2003 | 29 December 2006 | |
| Yu Wenzhe | 于文哲 | 29 December 2006 | 29 April 2010 | |
| Gong Jianzhong | 龚建忠 | 29 April 2010 | 25 October 2013 | |
| Sun Baohong | 孙保红 | 25 October 2013 | 27 December 2017 | |
| Wang Shiting | 王世廷 | 27 December 2017 | 29 April 2020 | |
| Lu Kun | 卢坤 | 17 October 2020 | | |

== See also ==
- China–Ghana relations
