= List of ambassadors of China to Mauritania =

The Chinese ambassador to Mauritania is the official representative of the People's Republic of China to Mauritania.

== List of representatives ==
Name (English)	Name (Chinese)	Tenure begins	Tenure ends	Note
Wei Yongqing	卫永清	September 1965	19 October 1965	Chargé d'affaires
Lü Zhixian	吕志先	28 September 1965	January 1967	
Wei Yongqing	卫永清	January 1967	February 1969	Chargé d'affaires
Jin Minsheng	靳民生	February 1969	July 1969	Chargé d'affaires
Feng Yujiu	冯于九	July 1969	6 April 1973	
Wang Peng	王彭	May 1973	June 1974	
Kang Maozhao	康矛召	January 1975	25 February 1978	
Zhao Yuan	赵源	May 1978	30 April 1982	
Sun Hao	孙浩	June 1982	28 October 1985	
Cui Jie	Cui Jie	January 1986	January 1989	
Liu Bai	柳白	May 1989	2 December 1993	
Zhang Junqi	张俊岐	January 1994	11 October 1998	
Cang Youheng	仓有衡	October 1998	December 2001	
Li Guoxue	李国学	December 2001	20 May 2007	
Zhang Xun	张迅	June 2007	8 December 2010	
Chen Gonglai	陈公来	December 2010	31 May 2014	
Wu Dong	武东	June 2014	10 February 2017	
Zhang Jianguo	张建国	March 2017	September 2020	
Li Baijun	李柏军	March 2021		

== See also ==
- China–Mauritania relations
