= List of ambassadors of China to Saudi Arabia =

The Chinese ambassador to Saudi Arabia is the official representative of the People's Republic of China to Saudi Arabia.

== List of representatives ==
=== Republic of China ===
Name (English)	Name (Chinese)	Tenure begins	Tenure ends	Note
Wang Shiming	王世明	16 October 1939	30 May 1956	Vice Consul
Wang Shiming	王世明	30 May 1956	30 May 1957	Consul
Wang Shiming	王世明	30 May 1957	1 September 1957	Chargé d'affaires
Ma Bufang	马步芳	9 August 1957	3 June 1961	
Cai Pa	蔡葩	May 1961	5 July 1961	Chargé d'affaires
Bao Junjian	保君建	3 August 1961	23 June 1966	
Zhao Jinyong	赵金镛	8 June 1961	30 July 1966	Chargé d'affaires
Li Qin	李琴	23 June 1966	27 August 1970	
Tian Baodai	田宝岱	27 August 1970	22 July 1974	
Wu Meicun	吴梅村	22 July 1974	25 January 1975	
Xue Yulin	薛毓麒	25 January 1975	16 December 1982	
Cai Weiping	蔡維屏	16 December 1982	7 August 1986	
Guan Yong	关镛	7 August 1986	July 1990	

=== People's Republic of China ===
Name (English)	Name (Chinese)	Tenure begins	Tenure ends	Note
Sun Bigan	孙必干	December 1989	24 August 1990	Commercial Representative
Sun Bigan	孙必干	15 September 1990	9 April 1994	
Zheng Dayong	郑达庸	May 1994	August 1997	
Yu Xingzhi	郁兴志	August 1997	9 August 2000	
Wu Sike	吴思科	September 2000	17 August 2003	
Wu Chunhua	武春华	October 2003	19 October 2007	
Yang Honglin	杨洪林	November 2007	16 October 2011	
Li Chengwen	李成文	November 2011	30 April 2016	
Li Huaxin	李华新	May 2016	March 2019	
Chen Weiqing	陈伟庆	April 2019		

== See also ==
- China–Saudi Arabia relations
- Saudi Arabia–Taiwan relations
