= List of ambassadors of China to Mali =

Overview article

Coordinates: 12.656273°N 7.974115°W

Chinese Ambassador to Mali
- Incumbent; Lu Huiying since December 2014
- Inaugural holder: Chen Hsiung-fei
- Formation: 21 September 1960; 65 years ago

The Chinese ambassador to Mali is the official representative of the People's Republic of China to the Republic of Mali.

== List of representatives ==
Diplomatic agrément/Diplomatic accreditation	Ambassador	Chinese language zh:中国驻马里大使列表	Observations	Premier of the People's Republic of China	List of prime ministers of Mali	Term end
June 20, 1960			On 31 March 1960 the government of France agreed to the Federation of Mali becoming fully independent.; French Sudan (now Mali) formed the Federation of Mali, which became fully independent on June 20.; The governments in Taipei and of the Mali Federation established diplomatic relations.	Chen Cheng	Modibo Keïta	
June 19, 1960			The Ministry of Foreign Affairs announced that China and the Federation of Mali have agreed to establish diplomatic relations. President Chiang cabled President Modibo Keita of the new African nation to congratulate him on the attainment of sovereign independence by the Federation of Mali.	Chen Cheng	Modibo Keïta	
September 5, 1964			The ROC chargé d'affaires in Dakar, Chen Hou-jou, was declared persona non grata on September 5, reportedly for inviting a Senegalese Foreign Ministry press officer.	Chen Cheng	Modibo Keïta	
September 19, 1960			The Malian Federation was disintegrated to Senegal and the Republic of Mali.	Chen Cheng	Modibo Keïta	
September 21, 1960	Chen Hsiung-fei	陈厚儒	On June 17, the ROC representative, Chen Hsiung-fei, had a friendly talk with Modibo Keïta and gave him reproductions of 300 Chinese paintings from the National Palace Museum. Modibo Keïta sent letters to ROC President Chiang Kai-shek.	Chen Cheng	Modibo Keïta	September 27, 1960
September 27, 1960	Rui Zheng	芮正臬	*In 1963 he was ambassador in Fort Lamy.	Chen Cheng	Modibo Keïta	October 22, 1960
September 19, 1960			On 22 October, the Republic of China broke off with the Republic of Mali.	Chen Cheng	Modibo Keïta	
October 25, 1960			The governments in Beijing and Bamako established diplomatic relations.	Zhou Enlai	Modibo Keïta	
March 1961	Lai Yali	赖亚力		Zhou Enlai	Modibo Keïta	April 1965
June 1965	Ma Ziqing	zh:马子卿		Zhou Enlai	Modibo Keïta	
April 1970	Meng Yue	zh:孟钺		Zhou Enlai	Moussa Traoré	July 1975
September 1975	Fan Zuokai	zh:樊作楷		Zhou Enlai	Moussa Traoré	December 1978
May 1979	Du Yi	zh:杜易		Hua Guofeng	Moussa Traoré	August 1982
March 1983	Zhou Haiping	周海萍		Zhao Ziyang	Moussa Traoré	June 1989
July 1989	Liu Lide	zh:刘立德		Li Peng	Moussa Traoré	August 1993
September 1993	Wu Donghe	zh:武东和		Li Peng	Alpha Oumar Konaré	November 1995
November 1995	Li Yongqian	zh:李永谦		Li Peng	Alpha Oumar Konaré	July 1999
August 1999	Cheng Tao	zh:程涛		Zhu Rongji	Alpha Oumar Konaré	August 2001
August 2001	Ma Zhixue	zh:马志学		Zhu Rongji	Alpha Oumar Konaré	October 2003
November 2003	Wei Wenhua	zh:魏文华 (外交官)		Wen Jiabao	Amadou Toumani Touré	January 2007
February 2007	Zhang Guoqing	张国庆		Wen Jiabao	Amadou Toumani Touré	March 2011
March 2011	Cao Zhongming	曹忠明		Wen Jiabao	Amadou Toumani Touré	October 2014
December 2014	Lu Huiying	陆慧英		Li Keqiang	Ibrahim Boubacar Keïta	
