= List of ambassadors of China to Egypt =

Chinese official representative to Egypt

Coordinates: 30.067977°N 31.218959°E

The ambassador of China to Egypt is the official representative of the People's Republic of China to the Arab Republic of Egypt.

The ambassador is also accredited to the Arab League.

== List of representatives ==
Designated	Accredited	Ambassador	Chinese language zh: 中国驻埃及大使列表	Observations	Premier of the People's Republic of China	Prime Minister of Egypt	Term end
May 25, 1942		Lin Tung-hai	林东海	Dr. Lin Tung-hai, senior counsellor of the Ministry of Foreign Affairs, was appointed the first Chinese Minister to Egypt on May 19, 1942, but before he left for his post he fell ill and resigned.	Chiang Kai-shek	Farouk of Egypt	
July 9, 1942		Tang Wu		Dr. Tang Wu, first secretary of the Chinese legation at Cairo, was appointed Chargé d'affaires of the legation on July 9, 1942.	Chiang Kai-shek	Farouk of Egypt	September 7, 1943
September 7, 1943	January 8, 1944	Hsu Nien-tseng	许念曾	Hsu Nien-tseng was appointed Chinese Minister to Egypt on September 7, 1943. Minister Hsu presented his credentials on January 17, 1944. Hsu Nien-tseng, arrived in Kabul in August, 1946.	Chiang Kai-shek	Farouk of Egypt	March 8, 1947
March 8, 1947	August 1, 1947	Ho Feng-Shan	zh:何凤山	On November 14, 1948 the mission was upgraded to that of an embassy	Zhang Qun	Farouk of Egypt	May 17, 1956
July 1, 1956		Chen Jiakang	zh:陈家康	Chen Jiakang (* 1913; † 1970 in Hubei Guangji County): In 1955, the People's Republic of China as the Assistant Foreign Minister.; From July 1956 to December 1965 he was ambassador to Cairo.; February 1, 1958: United Arab Republic a coalition of Egypt and Syria.; In 1958, he served as minister People's Republic of China in the Republic of Yemen.; In January 1966 he was Deputy Minister of Foreign Affairs People's Republic of China.	Zhou Enlai	Gamal Abdel Nasser	December 1, 1965
March 1, 1966		Huang Hua	zh:黄华 (政治人物)	*From 1960 to 1965 he was ambassador in Accra (Ghana).: From 1966 to 1970 he was ambassador in Cairo (Egypt).; From 1971 to 1972 he was ambassador in Ottawa (Canada).; From 1971 to 1976 he was permanent representative in New York City (Headquarters of the United Nations).	Zhou Enlai	Gamal Abdel Nasser	September 1, 1969
June 1, 1970		Chai Zemin	柴泽民	From 1961 to 1964 he was ambassador in Budapest (Hungary).; From 1964 to 1967 he was ambassador in Conakry (Guinea).; From 1970 to 1974 he was ambassador in Cairo (Egypt).; From 1976 to 1978 he was ambassador in Bangkok (Thailand).; From 1979 to 1982 he was ambassador in Washington, D.C. (United States).	Zhou Enlai	Anwar Sadat	August 1, 1974
September 1, 1974		Zhang Tong	zh:张彤 (外交官)	From July 1961 - September 1961 he was ambassador in Kinshasa (Democratic Republic of the Congo).; From June 1969 - August 1974 he was ambassador in Islamabad (Pakistan).; From September 1974 - May 1977 he was ambassador in Cairo (Egypt).; From August 1977 - October 1982 he was ambassador in Bonn (Germany).	Zhou Enlai	Anwar Sadat	May 1, 1977
July 1, 1977		Yao Guang	zh:姚广		Hua Guofeng	Anwar Sadat	February 1, 1980
April 1, 1980		Liu Chun	zh:刘春 (外交官)	(*1918 in Hebei Huanghua- August 17, 2007 in Beijing) was a Chinese Communist Party official, People's Liberation Army general, politician and diplomat: In November 1937 to join the Chinese Communist Party, was instructor, camp instructor, group director of political department, In November 1961 he entered the Ministry of Foreign Affairs, served as deputy head of the economic and cultural delegation of the Chinese Embassy in Laos, on behalf of the head of the People's Republic of China's first ambassador in Laos; From October 1962 - January 1967 he was ambassador in Vientiane (Laos).; From May 1972 - March 1976 he was ambassador in Ankara (Turkey).; From May 1976 - October 1979 he was ambassador in Dar es Salaam (Tanzania) and concurrente the first ambassador to the Seychelles; From April 1980 - August 1982 he was ambassador in Cairo (Egypt).; In June 1982 he was designated Dean of the Diplomatic Academy.; After 1988, he served as Vice President of China, Asia and Africa Institute, president of the Institute of the Middle East, China and Laos Friendship Association.; In October 1994 he was retired.	Zhao Ziyang	Anwar Sadat	August 1, 1982
December 1, 1982		Ding Guoyu	zh:丁国钰	*From 1955 to 1958 he was ambassador in Kabul (Afghanistan).: From 1959 to 1966 he was ambassador in Islamabad (Pakistan).; From 1980 to 1982 he was ambassador in Oslo (Norway).; From 1982 to 1984 he was ambassador in Cairo (Egypt).	Zhao Ziyang	Ahmad Fuad Muhi ad-Din	November 1, 1984
February 1, 1985		Wen Yezhan	zh:温业湛	(* 1928 in Huzhou, Zhejiang): From 1984 to 1987 he was ambassador in Cairo (Egypt).; From 1987 to 1990 he was ambassador in Pyongyang (North Korea).; From 1990 to 1992 he was ambassador in Ottawa (Canada).	Zhao Ziyang	Ali Mahmud Lutfi	July 1, 1987
June 1, 1987		Zhan Shiliang	zh:詹世亮	From December 1984 - August 1987 he was ambassador in Ankara (Turkey).; From June 1987 - November 1991 he was ambassador in Cairo (Egypt).	Li Peng	Atif Muhammad Nagib Sidqi	November 1, 1991
September 1, 1991		Zhu Yinglu	朱应鹿	From June 1990 to October 1991 he was ambassador in Tunis (Tunesia).; From September 1991 to December 1993 he was ambassador in Cairo (Egypt).; From February 1994 to June 1998 he was ambassador in Oslo (Norway).	Li Peng	Atif Muhammad Nagib Sidqi	December 1, 1993
July 1, 1993		Yang Fuchang	zh:杨福昌	From 1984 to 1987 he was ambassador in Kuwait City (Kuwait).; From 1994 to 1998 he was ambassador in Cairo (Egypt).; From 1999 to 2003 he was president of China Foreign Affairs University.	Li Peng	Atif Muhammad Nagib Sidqi	December 1, 1998
November 1, 1998		An Huihou	zh:安惠侯	From July 1988 - October 1991 he was ambassador in Algiers (Algeria).; From December 1991 - August 1993 he was ambassador in Tunis (Tunesia).; From July 1996 - December 1998 he was ambassador in Beirut (Lebanon).; From November 1998 - August 2001 he was ambassador in Cairo (Egypt). A Chinese mission headed by China's former Ambassador to Egypt An Huihou observed the election of the Palestinian Legislative Council from 20 to 26 January	Zhu Rongji	Kamal al-Ganzuri	August 1, 2001
April 1, 2001		Liu Xiaoming	zh:刘晓明		Zhu Rongji	Atif Abaid	September 1, 2003
June 1, 2003		Wu Sike	zh:吴思科		Wen Jiabao	Atif Abaid	November 1, 2007
November 1, 2007		Wu Chunhua	zh:武春华	From June 2003 to November 2007 he was ambassador in Riyadh (Saudi Arabia).; From November 2007 to October 2010 he was ambassador in Cairo (Egypt).	Wen Jiabao	Ahmed Nazif	October 1, 2010
October 1, 2010		Song Aiguo	zh:宋爱国	From September 2000 to February 2003 he was ambassador in Nikossia (Cyprus).; From December 2002 - October 2006 he was ambassador in Ankara (Turkey).; Since October 2010 he is ambassador in Cairo (Egypt).	Wen Jiabao	Ahmed Nazif	
