= List of ambassadors of China to Antigua and Barbuda =

Coordinates: 17.145551°N 61.825190°W

The ambassador of China to Antigua and Barbuda is the official representative of the People's Republic of China to Antigua and Barbuda.

== List of representatives ==
Designated/accredited	Ambassador	Chinese language zh:中国驻安提瓜和巴布达大使列表	Observations	Premier of the People's Republic of China	Prime Minister of Antigua and Barbuda	Term end
January 1983	Wang Tao (diplomat)	zh:汪滔 (外交官)	with concurrent accreditation in Bridgetown (Barbados).; In 1982 he was counsellor in Hanoi.	Zhao Ziyang	Vere Cornwall Bird	April 1984
September 1984	Li Jie (diplomat)	zh:李颉	Concurrently accredited in Bridgetown (Barbados); In 1982 he was Chargé d'affaires in Nairobi	Zhao Ziyang	Vere Cornwall Bird	May 1986
September 1986	Gu Zhifang	zh:顾志方	Concurrent accreditation in Bridgetown (Barbados)	Zhao Ziyang	Vere Cornwall Bird	May 1987
September 1987	Luzong Qing	zh:陆宗卿	Concurrent accreditation in Bridgetown (Barbados)	Li Peng	Vere Cornwall Bird	April 1990
September 1990	Zhou Wenzhong (diplomat)	zh:周文重	Concurrent accreditation in Bridgetown (Barbados)	Li Peng	Vere Cornwall Bird	October 1992
November 1992	Jiang Chengzong	zh:江承宗	Concurrent accreditation in Bridgetown (Barbados)	Li Peng	Vere Cornwall Bird	November 1996
January 1997	Zhan Daode	zh:詹道德	Concurrent accreditation in Bridgetown (Barbados)	Li Peng	Lester Bird	January 1999
March 1999	Yang Younong	吴正龙		Zhu Rongji	Lester Bird	March 2000
April 2000	Yang Shixiang	杨世祥	1991: Third Secretary, Embassy, Jamaica	Zhu Rongji	Lester Bird	August 2004
October 14, 2004	Ren Xiaoping	zh:任小萍		Wen Jiabao	Baldwin Spencer	October 2007
October 2007	Chen Ligang	陈立钢		Wen Jiabao	Baldwin Spencer	July 2010
August 2010	Liu Hanmingg	刘汉明		Wen Jiabao	Baldwin Spencer	March 2013
April 2013	Ren Xiaoping	zh:任小萍		Li Keqiang	Baldwin Spencer	June 2016
June 2016	Wang Xianmin	王宪民		Li Keqiang	Gaston Browne	March 2023
