= List of ambassadors of China to Lithuania =

Coordinates: 54.674280°N 25.272310°E

The Chinese ambassador to Lithuania was the official representative of the People's Republic of China to the Republic of Lithuania.

== List of representatives ==
Diplomatic agrément/Diplomatic accreditation	ambassador	Observations	List of premiers of the Republic of China	Prime Minister of Lithuania	Term end
January 1992	Pei Yuanying		Li Peng	Gediminas Vagnorius	March 1992
April 1992	Chen Di	"(*1940), concurrently accredited to Latvia, Estonia and Lithuania: September 1993 - July 1997 Ambassador to Kazakhstan.; From March 1998 to October 2000 he was Ambassador in Warsaw Poland"	Li Peng	Gediminas Vagnorius	August 1993
September 1993	Wang Zhaoxian		Li Peng	Adolfas Šleževičius	August 1998
September 1998	Guan Hengguang		Zhu Rongji	Gediminas Vagnorius	February 2002
March 2002	Chen Yuming		Zhu Rongji	Algirdas Brazauskas	January 2005
January 2005	Xiang Xiuping		Wen Jiabao	Algirdas Brazauskas	November 2008
January 2009	Tong Mingtao		Wen Jiabao	Andrius Kubilius	December 2011
January 2012	Liu Zengwen		Wen Jiabao	Andrius Kubilius	March 2015
April 2015	Wei Ruixing		Li Keqiang	Algirdas Butkevičius	January 2018
March 2018	Shen Zhifei				August 2021

On November 18, 2021, Lithuania permitted the establishment of a "Taiwan Representative Office in Lithuania" by Taiwanese officials, against China's formal objections. China articulated a formal protest in this matter and reduced diplomatic relations between the two nations to the level of chargé d'affaires.
