= List of ambassadors of China to Kenya =

Coordinates: 1.290981°S 36.797706°E

Ambassador of China to Kenya
- Incumbent; Liu Xianfa since January 2014
- Inaugural holder: Wang Yutian
- Formation: April 1964; 62 years ago

The ambassador of China to Kenya is the official representative of the People's Republic of China to the Republic of Kenya.

== List of representatives ==
Diplomatic agrément/Diplomatic accreditation	Ambassador	Chinese language zh:中国驻肯尼亚大使列表	Observations	Premier of the People's Republic of China	President of Kenya	Term end
April 1964	Wang Yutian	zh:王雨田		Zhou Enlai	Jomo Kenyatta	June 1969
September 1974	Wang Yueyi	zh:王越毅		Zhou Enlai	Jomo Kenyatta	January 1979
April 1979	Yang Keming	zh:杨克明		Hua Guofeng	Daniel arap Moi	June 1984
December 1984	Wei Yongqing	zh:卫永清		Zhao Ziyang	Daniel arap Moi	November 1986
December 1986	Xue Mouhong	zh:薛谋洪		Zhao Ziyang	Daniel arap Moi	June 1989
August 1989	Wu Minglian	zh:吴明廉		Li Peng	Daniel arap Moi	February 1993
April 1993	Chen Pingchu	zh:陈平初		Li Peng	Daniel arap Moi	October 1996
November 1996	An Yongyu	zh:安永玉		Li Peng	Daniel arap Moi	November 2000
December 2000	Du Qiwen	zh:杜起文		Zhu Rongji	Daniel arap Moi	March 2003
April 2003	Guo Chongli	zh:郭崇立		Wen Jiabao	Mwai Kibaki	August 2006
September 2006	Zhang Ming	zh:张明		Wen Jiabao	Mwai Kibaki	March 2009
May 2009	Deng Hongbo	zh:邓洪波		Wen Jiabao	Mwai Kibaki	September 2010
September 2010	Liu Guangyuan	zh:刘光源		Wen Jiabao	Mwai Kibaki	January 2014
January 2014	Liu Xianfa	刘显法		Li Keqiang	Uhuru Kenyatta	
