= Agrément =

Concept in diplomacy

Agrément, in international affairs, is the agreement by a state to receive members of a diplomatic mission from a foreign country.

== Procedure ==
In this procedure, the posting state formally requests consent, via a demande d'agréation, from the receiving state before appointing a diplomat to the receiving state. If the nominated diplomat is acceptable to the receiving state, the receiving state gives agrément.

As codified by the Vienna Convention on Diplomatic Relations, the state receiving the designated diplomat may refuse agrément without giving a reason. The absence of a timely agrément is often considered a refusal to agree to the proposed designation.

=== Relation with presentation of credentials ===
The arriving diplomat carries a letter of accreditation, normally called the letter of credence or lettre de créance, from the posting state to the head of state of the receiving state, when arriving in the receiving state. This is presented to the head of state of the receiving state, and the diplomat is thereby accepted as a member of the diplomatic corps of the receiving state and added to a diplomatic list. The designated person enjoys diplomatic immunity in the receiving state.

== See also ==
- Letter of credence
