= List of ambassadors of China to Ukraine =

Chinese Ambassador to Ukraine
- Incumbent; Ma Shengkun since 20 November 2024
- Inaugural holder: Zhang Zhen
- Formation: May 1992

The Chinese ambassador to Ukraine is the official representative of the People's Republic of China to Ukraine.

== List of representatives ==
Ambassador	Chinese language zh:中国驻乌克兰大使列表	Ukrainian language uk:Посольство КНР в Україні	Diplomatic agrément Diplomatic accreditation	Term end	References
Zhang Zhen	zh:张震 (外交官)	uk:Чжан Чжень	May 1992	March 1995	
Pan Zhanlin	zh:潘占林	uk:Пань Чжаньлінь	May 1995	April 1998	
Zhou Xiaopei	zh:周晓沛	uk:Чжоу Сяопей	July 1998	October 2000	
Li Guobang	zh:李国邦	uk:Ле Гобан	November 2000	September 2003	
Yao Peisheng	zh:姚培生	uk:Яо Пейшен	November 2003	October 2005	
Gao Yusheng	zh:高玉生	uk:Гао Юйшен	November 2005	January 2007	
Zhou Li	zh:周力 (1955年)	uk:Чжоу Лі	March 2, 2007	April 2010	
Zhang Xiyun	zh:张喜云	uk:Чжан Сіюнь	July 27, 2010	May 2016	
Du Wei	zh:杜伟 (1962年10月)	uk:Ду Вей	June 6, 2016	December 29, 2019	
Fan Xianrong	zh:范先荣	uk:Фань Сяньжун	February 27, 2020	November 2024	
Ma Shengkun	zh:马升琨	uk:Ма Шенкунь	November 20, 2024		

== See also ==
- China–Ukraine relations
