= Embassy of China, Tel Aviv =

Embassy of the People's Republic of China in the State of Israel 中华人民共和国驻以色列国大使馆
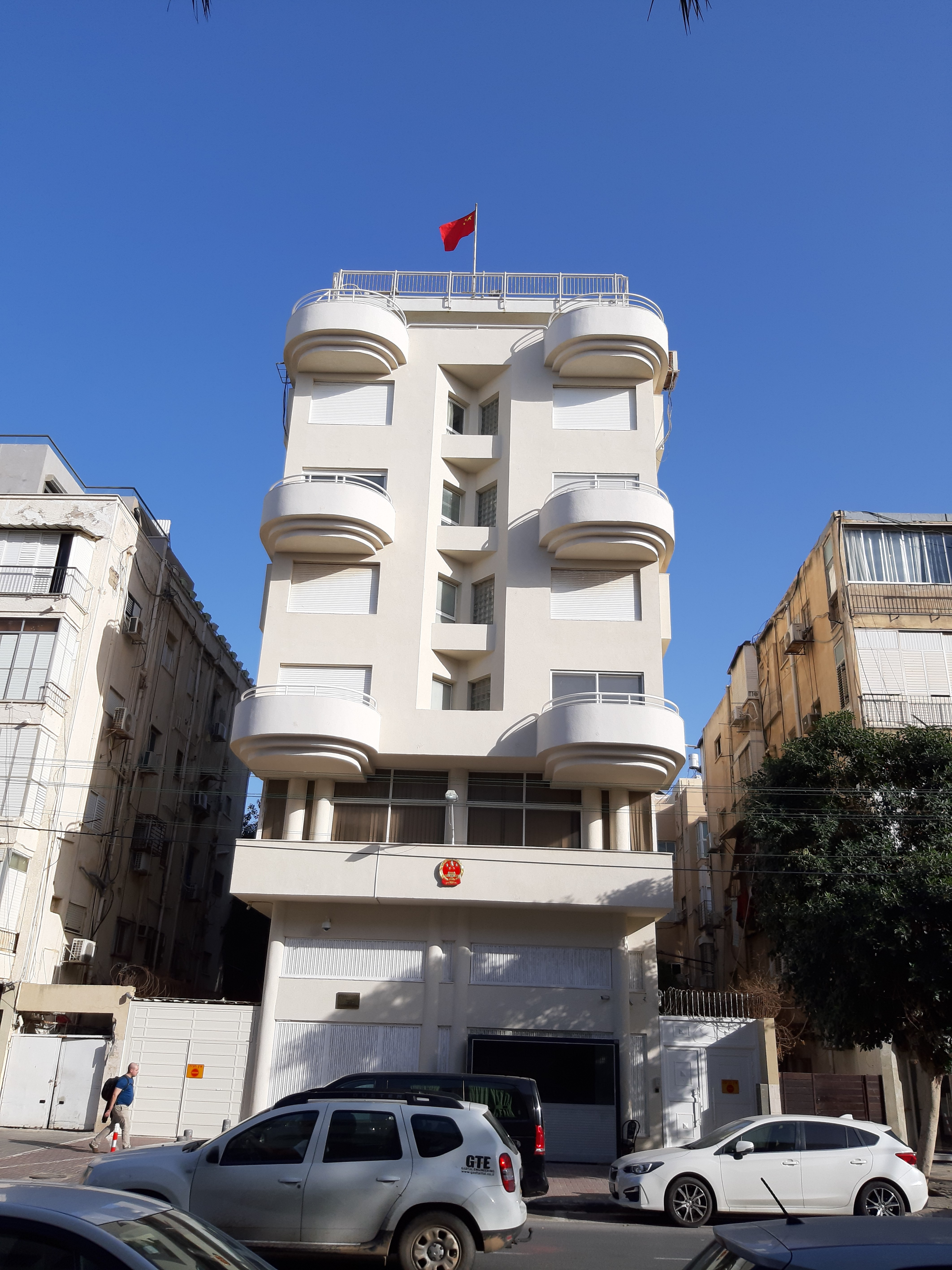
- Location: Old North District, Tel Aviv, Israel
- Address: 222 Ben Yehuda St., Tel Aviv, Israel
- Coordinates: 32°05′40″N 34°46′29″E
- Ambassador: Run Cai
- Website: il.china-embassy.gov.cn/chn

The Embassy of the People's Republic of China in the State of Israel (Chinese: 中华人民共和国驻以色列国大使馆 ; Hebrew: שגרירות הרפובליקה העממית של סין במדינת ישראל) is the official diplomatic mission of the People's Republic of China to the State of Israel, located in Tel Aviv. The embassy was opened in 1992, and the current ambassador is Run Cai.

== History ==
The Chinese Embassy in Israel was established on September 15, 1989, as the Tel Aviv office of the China International Travel Service, which received official status on February 1, 1990. On January 24, 1992, Israel and China established full diplomatic relations, and on February 9, Tang Zhenqi, the manager of the office, became China's ambassador to Israel.

On May 17, 2020, China's ambassador to Israel, Du Wei, was found dead in his apartment in Herzliya Pituah. There were no signs of violence, and the cause of death appears to be cardiac arrest. His death led to some conspiracy theories, but none were verified.

On December 7, 2022, a Spanish human rights organization called Safeguard Defenders claimed that a covert representative was operating in the embassy without the knowledge of the Israeli authorities. Officials in the Prime Minister's Office said that the issue is under review.

== List of Ambassadors ==
| Diplomatic agrément/Diplomatic accreditation | Ambassador | Chinese language zh:中国驻以色列大使列表 | Observations | Premier of the People's Republic of China | President of Israel | Term end |
|---|---|---|---|---|---|---|
| January 9, 1950 | | | Israel announced its recognition of the People's Republic of China. | Zhou Enlai | Chaim Weizmann | |
| September 1989 | | | China established the China International Travel Service office in Tel Aviv. | Li Peng | Chaim Herzog | |
| 1992 | | | Establishment of diplomatic relations | Li Peng | Chaim Herzog | |
| September 1989 | Tang Zhenqi | zh:唐振琪 | (February 1944): In 1966, he graduated from the Department of Shanghai Normal University Foreign Languages.; In 1972, transferred to the Ministry of Foreign Affairs, the embassy in the translation of Pakistan, industry officials Foreign Ministry Foreign Affairs Division North Africa.; In 1989, he served as director of the tourism office in Israel.; In 1993, the Ministry of Foreign Affairs as WANA Counselor.; In 1998 he was ambassador to Namibia. In 2000 was Ministry of Foreign Affairs head of staff.; From 2002 to 2004 he was ambassador to Athens Greece. In 2005 he retired. | Li Peng | Chaim Herzog | January 1992 |
| January 1992 | Lin Zhen | zh:林真 (外交官) | From 1989 to 1992 he was ambassador in Yemen, RDP | Li Peng | Chaim Herzog | February 1992 |
| November 1995 | Wang Changyi | zh:王昌义 | 1983–1986: Djibouti; 1986–1989: Syria | Li Peng | Ezer Weizman | August 1995 |
| November 2000 | Pan Zhanlin | zh:潘占林 | From July 1992 to January 1995 he was Ambassador to Kyrgyzstan.; From December 1994 to April 1998 was Ambassador to Ukraine.; From December 1997 to October 2000 he was Ambassador in Belgrade Yugoslavia. | Zhu Rongji | Moshe Katsav | April 2000 |
| November 2003 | Chen Yonglong | zh:陈永龙 | From April 2001 to October 2003 he was ambassador to Jordan. | Wen Jiabao | Moshe Katsav | June 2003 |
| April 2007 | Zhao Jun | zh:赵军 (外交官) | | Wen Jiabao | Shimon Peres | May 2007 |
| September 2011 | Gao Yanping | zh:高燕平 | | Wen Jiabao | Shimon Peres | September 2011 |
| February 2015 | Zhan Yongxin | 詹永新 | | Li Keqiang | Reuven Rivlin | February 2020 |
| February 2020 | Du Wei | 杜伟 | From 2016 to 2019 he was ambassador to Ukraine; Died in office | Li Keqiang | Reuven Rivlin | May 17, 2020 |
| January 2021 | Cai Run | 蔡润 | | Li Keqiang | Reuven Rivlin | |
| November 2024 | Xiao Junzheng | | | Li Keqiang | Reuven Rivlin | |

== See also ==
- China-Israel relations
- Embassy of Israel, Beijing
- List of diplomatic missions of China
- List of diplomatic missions in Israel
