= Zhang Zhen =

Zhang Zhen (Wade–Giles: Chang Chen) may refer to:

- Zhang Zhen (Qing dynasty) (張貞), Chinese scholar of the Qing period
- Zhang Zhen (general) (1914–2015), Chinese general of the People's Liberation Army
- Zhang Zhen (diplomat, born 1930), former Chinese ambassador to Ukraine
- Zhang Zhen (diplomat, born 1936), former Chinese ambassador to Jordan and Syria
- Chang Chen or Zhang Zhen (born 1976), Taiwanese actor
- Zhang Zhen (athlete) (born 1984), Chinese Paralympics gold medallist
- Zhang Zhen (章贞), professor in Uppsala University.
