= Ukrainians in China =

Ethnic group in China

Українці Китаю

Total population
- 5,000–20,000

Regions with significant populations
- Beijing, Hong Kong, Manchuria (currently centered in Harbin)

Languages
- Ukrainian, Russian, Chinese

Religion
- Christianity (mostly Eastern Orthodoxy)

Related ethnic groups
- Russians, Poles

Ukrainians have been present in China since the early 18th century and have been a significant part of the Ukrainian national movement in the Far East. Historically holding a significant presence in Harbin, the Ukrainians of China saw a peak of political activity in the interwar and World War II before being effectively integrated into Chinese society in 1948. However, since Euromaidan, Ukrainians have once again begun to re-establish their unique identity in China.

== History ==
=== Early settlement ===
The 1689 Treaty of Nerchinsk, conducted between the Tsardom of Russia and the Qing dynasty, marks the beginning of the Ukrainian community in China. The newfound trade advantages allowed the Russian Orthodox Church to interact with the Orthodox Albazinian community in Beijing. A church known as the Church of Saint Nicholas was established by Maxim Leontiev following his capture in the 1685 Battle of Albazino. However, the church remained stagnant until 1716, when archimandrite Hilarion Lezhaisky (born in Chernihiv) arrived with a ten-person group intending to establish the Russian Orthodox Church in China. Despite early successes, the effort was quickly undermined by Lezhaisky's efforts to obtain more funding from the Qing government, leading to the ten followers returning to Russia a year later. Lezhaisky then fell into alcoholism, dying the next year.

During the early 19th century, Ukrainian doctor Yosyp Voytsekhovskyi actively countered cholera in China.

A wave of Ukrainian migrants began to arrive almost two centuries after Lezhaisky's mission to China, with the construction of the Chinese Eastern Railway in the 1890s. Many migrants arrived from Central Asia, where work on the Trans-Caspian railway had recently been completed. This wave of migration formed the backbone of the Ukrainian presence in China, with Ukrainian communities being established in the cities of Dalian, Harbin, Jilin, and Mukden (now Shenyang). Early Ukrainian settlement was soon followed by the establishment of several cultural organisations, including a bandurist choir and the "Ukrainian Club".

=== Russian Civil War ===
The Ukrainian community of Harbin became part of Green Ukraine (flag pictured) during the Russian Civil War

During the Russian Civil War, the Ukrainians of Harbin threw their weight behind the self-declared state of Green Ukraine. On 16 July 1917, Ukrainians in Harbin held a meeting where it was formally determined to join Green Ukraine. In the spring and summer of the same year, two sotnias were raised among the Harbin Ukrainians with the goal of assisting Ukraine properly in its war of independence, leaving for Ukraine from Vladivostok.

As the Bolsheviks were pushed back from early gains in the Far East by Chinese forces participating in the allied intervention in the Russian Civil War, the Chinese military provided protection and support for Green Ukrainian governmental and military bodies, who began issuing Ukrainian passports. However, this venture was short-lived, and by 1920, the Far East had become part of the Far Eastern Republic, a Bolshevik buffer state.

=== Interwar period and World War II ===
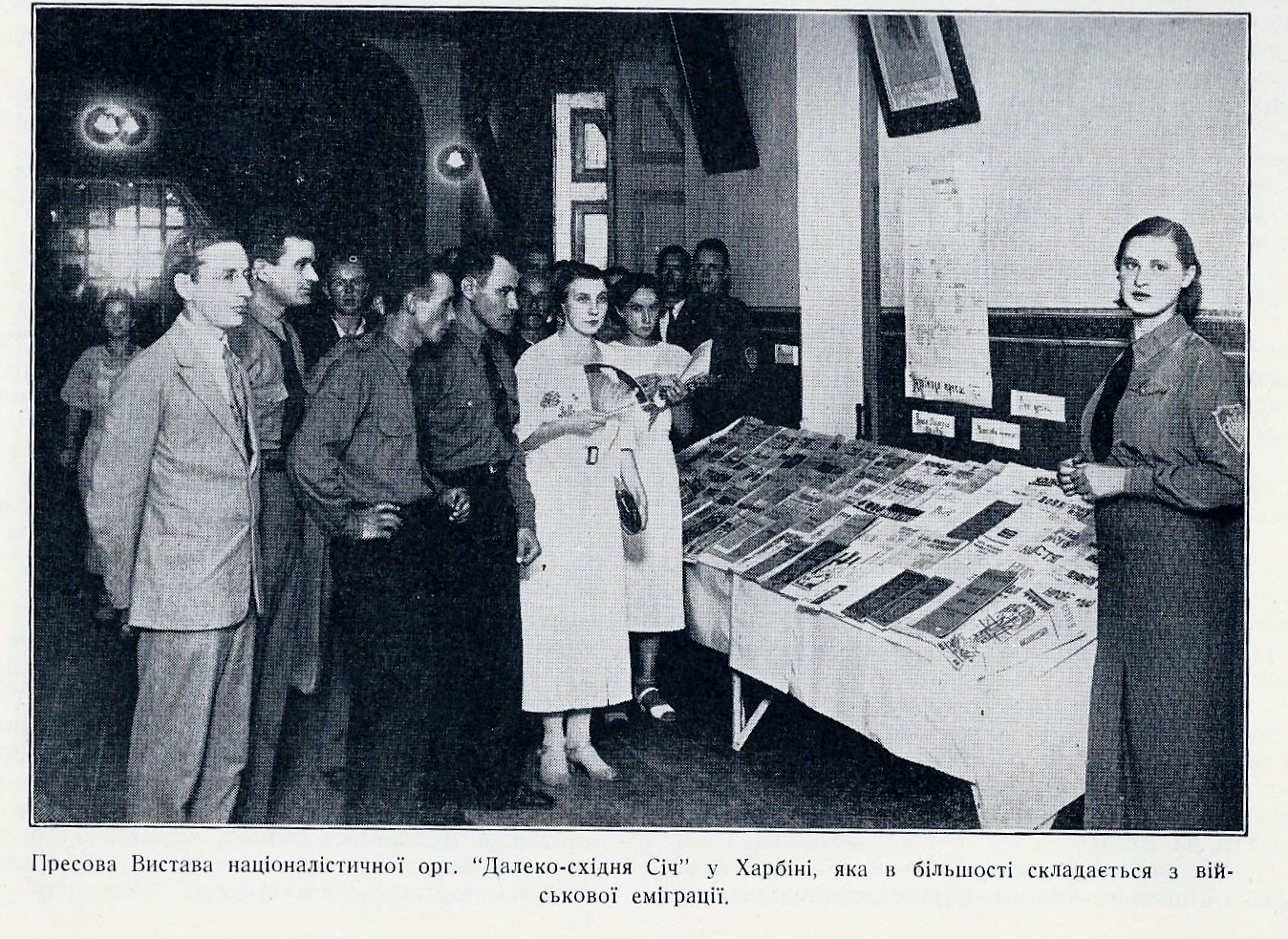
Press exhibition of the Ukrainian Far Eastern Sich in Harbin, c. 1930s

After the Russian Civil War (particularly after the dissolution of the Far Eastern Republic), the Ukrainian community in Manchuria found its size bolstered by political refugees from Green Ukraine. Many of the Green Ukrainian movement's leaders fled to Manchuria out of fear of persecution, establishing themselves in Harbin and other cities throughout Manchuria. There, they received a chilly reception from the Chinese government, which, in spite of its support for Ukrainians in the Russian Civil War, began attempting to suppress Ukrainian nationalism in 1923. Though some of the Ukrainian communities dispersed (leaving for Hong Kong, Shanghai, or South America), the Ukrainian diaspora in China continued to function.

The Harbin Ukrainian community was also noticed by the Organization of Ukrainian Nationalists leader Yevhen Konovalets, who sent several OUN members to establish contacts with the community in the mid-1930s. This expedition also aimed to establish connections with the Empire of Japan, which had seized Manchuria and established the puppet state of Manchukuo in 1932. Konovalets also visited Manchuria to contact the city's Ukrainian community. In 1937, OUN members who had organised the Horodok post office attack and subsequently fled to Italy were sent to Manchuria with the intention of cooperating with the Japanese government in activities aimed at restoring Green Ukraine and combatting the Soviet government. However, relations between the OUN and Japan quickly soured, with the OUN's refusal to cooperate with the Harbin Russians.

During the interwar period, Ukrainian organisations continued to be established in Harbin, including a chapter of the Ukrainian Youth Association (which became the Ukrainian Far Eastern Sich) and Prosvita. The Ukrainian community in Manchuria boomed at this time, with an estimated population of 30,000–45,000 in the 1930s. However, the boom ultimately proved to be short-lived, as the Soviet invasion of Manchuria sent the community fleeing southwards to Tianjin and Shanghai. As the Chinese Civil War progressed, many remaining Ukrainians were evacuated to Taiwan, the United Kingdom, the United States, Canada, Australia, the Philippines.

== Present status ==
There remains an ethnically Ukrainian community in China, though it is almost entirely assimilated, and its size is unknown (estimates range from 5,000 to 20,000). Since Euromaidan and the Revolution of Dignity, an increased interest in Ukrainian culture has emerged among Chinese Ukrainians. These interests have been supported by a new generation of Ukrainian students studying in China and the Ukrainian embassy in China. In April 2014, the Association of Ukrainian Students was formed to establish communication between Ukrainian university students in China.

Chinese Ukrainians have also organised themselves, participating in cultural and charity events and creating informational resources about their history. Oleksandr Kamenskyi, leader of the Ukrainian community of Guangzhou, has cited Russian attitudes towards Ukraine as responsible for bringing members of the Ukrainian diaspora in China closer together. In the city of Shanghai (home to 300–700 Ukrainians), Ukrainian cultural events have also been organised.

=== Ukrainians in Hong Kong ===
Hong Kong is also home to a sizeable Ukrainian community. During the 2019–2020 Hong Kong protests, members of the Ukrainian public supported the protests. The Chinese ambassador to Russia, Zhang Hanhui, additionally alleged that there was a "Ukrainian footprint" in the protests and that "Ukrainian elements are allegedly traveling to convey their experience to the residents of Hong Kong." Additional controversy occurred after four members of the Azov Battalion and Right Sector were seen in Hong Kong (among them Serhii Filimonov) supporting protesters, with an investigation being launched by the Hong Kong police and concerns being raised by researchers on the far-right that they could use the Hong Kong protests as an example for protests against the Ukrainian government. Another controversy occurred when eight Ukrainian citizens were barred from entering Hong Kong by Chinese government authorities, leading to the Ukrainian embassy dispatching a consular officer to ensure Ukrainians were allowed to visit Hong Kong freely in accordance with agreements between the governments of China and Ukraine.

In 2022, following the Russian invasion of Ukraine, Ivan The Kozak, a local Ukrainian restaurant in Hong Kong became a centre of efforts by Hong Kongers to donate to Ukraine. The Ukrainian Society of Hong Kong has also reported that an unknown number of people have donated, frequently donating HK$1,000–3,000.

== See also ==
- China–Ukraine relations
- Taiwan–Ukraine relations
- Green Ukraine
