= Russians in Hong Kong =

Ethnic minority in Hong Kong, China

Total population
- 5,000 (2016 estimate)

Regions with significant populations
- Central and Western District: Mid-Levels; Eastern District: North Point, Kornhill, Chai Wan

Languages
- Russian, Cantonese and English

Religion
- Russian Orthodox Church

Related ethnic groups
- Russians in China

Russians in Hong Kong form one of the territory's smaller groups of expatriates and a minor portion of the worldwide Russian diaspora. Many Russians from China passed through Hong Kong in the 1950s through 1970s on their way to resettlement in Australia, Brazil, and Canada.

== Migration history ==
In colonial Hong Kong, White Russians in the pre-World War II period were looked down upon by the British. American historian Gerald Horne states that their lifestyles, employment, and poverty were seen to "undermine 'white privilege'", and other Europeans tried to avoid any interaction with them. Nevertheless, in 1930 a number were engaged by the Anti-Piracy Guard Contingent (established in 1914) which came under the auspices of the Hong Kong Police. They were not trained police officers with warrant cards, and accordingly were paid less. After WWII, some of the more capable Russians joined the HKP as inspectors in Water Police - one, Alex Zarembra, was killed in 1947 when his launch collided with a steamer off Tsim Sha Tsui.

After the establishment of the People's Republic of China, the White Russians remaining in China such as in Shanghai began to look to the exits. However, the government would only permit them to leave the country if they had secured visas for overseas destinations. There were further bureaucratic complications in obtaining such visas since at that early date, most countries in which Russians aimed to resettle did not yet recognize the PRC, but recognizing the Republic of China (Taiwan) instead. Similarly, Hong Kong only permitted entry to the refugees if they had those same visas, which in most cases could only be obtained from diplomatic missions in Hong Kong. As a result of these barriers, only 880 Russian refugees from China departed via Hong Kong for resettlement overseas in 1952; they also faced pressure from the PRC government to abandon their efforts to emigrate and instead return to the Soviet Union. However, by 1956, the divergence between the PRC and the Soviet Union which would eventually grow into a full-blown Sino-Soviet split had begun to grow, and the PRC's policy towards the White Russians softened: the government no longer repatriated them to the Soviet Union, and liberalised the issuance of exit permits.

The Hong Kong government had picked out a site to set up a camp for Russian refugees at Chi Ma Wan on Lantau Island, but in the end decided not to build it. Instead, the Office of the United Nations High Commissioner for Refugees and private charities including the World Council of Churches provided the funds for the refugees to be sheltered in private boarding-houses and to receive money to cover their other medical expenses. Their major destinations included Australia, Brazil, and Canada. Some who faced a long wait for resettlement found work as domestic helpers or on construction sites, in addition to receiving living allowances from the UN; young children also enrolled in schools. By 1980, a total of twenty thousand White Russians from mainland China had passed through Hong Kong on their way to resettlement in overseas destinations.

== Organizations and community ==
The history of the Russian Orthodox Church in Hong Kong goes back to 1934, when Dmitry Ivanovich Uspensky of Vyazniki, Vladimir Oblast arrived in Southern China from his previous posting in Shanghai. The Orthodox Metropolitanate of Hong Kong and Southeast Asia was officially established in 1996. Hong Kong Cemetery in Happy Valley has 105 Russian Orthodox graves; in 2012, the Royal Asiatic Society Hong Kong Branch and the Hong Kong Orthodox Church jointly led a project to restore 15 of them.

The Russian Club in Hong Kong was formally established in 1999 out of informal gatherings, which began as early as 1993; it celebrated its 10th anniversary in 2009 with a grand ball, which attracted roughly 150 participants. The Russian consul-general in Hong Kong estimated in 2007 that just 600 Russian citizens lived in Hong Kong. Another 2011 consular estimate suggested that there were only 400 Russian citizens living in Hong Kong, but that estimate doubled to 800 by 2013, while the Russian Club thought that the true number might be as high as two thousand due to the tendency of many Russian expatriates not to register with the consulate. Observers attribute the growth in the population to the expansion of business ties between Hong Kong and Russia. Former Russian Club's president Mark Zavadisky stated, "Unlike other Western or European countries, Hong Kong is an exotic, upscale and trendy place for Russia's younger generation, people are setting their sights on Asia, particularly Hong Kong".

== In popular culture ==
Russians in Hong Kong have also been the subject of works of fiction; The Back Door, an 1897 war novel, imagined a naval invasion of Hong Kong by the Russians and the French. The autobiographical Gweilo by Martin Booth covering his childhood in 1950s Hong Kong reminisces of the Russian bakeries and discusses an elderly White Russian street woman who may have been Russian royalty.

== See also ==
- Chinese people in Russia
- Russians in China
- Americans in Hong Kong
- Ukrainians in Hong Kong
