= List of ambassadors of China to Tajikistan =

Coordinates: 38.591947°N 68.786151°E

Chinese Ambassador to Tajikistan
- Incumbent; Ji Shumin since March 2022
- Inaugural holder: Xi Zhaoming
- Formation: August 1992; 34 years ago

The Chinese ambassador to Tajikistan is the official representative of the People's Republic of China to the Republic of Tajikistan.

== List of representatives ==
| Diplomatic agrément/Diplomatic accreditation | Ambassador | Chinese language zh:中国驻塔吉克斯坦大使列表 | Observations | Premier of the People's Republic of China | Prime Minister of Tajikistan | Term end |
|---|---|---|---|---|---|---|
| January 4, 1992 | | | The governments in Dushanbe and Beijing established diplomatic relations. | Li Peng | Akbar Mirzoyev | |
| August 1992 | Xi Zhaoming | zh:郗照明 | From September 1983 - July 1986 he was Chinese Ambassador to Albania.; From August 1992 - March 1995 he was Ambassador Dushanbe. | Li Peng | Akbar Mirzoyev | March 1995 |
| June 1994 | Chen Zhongcheng | zh:陈忠诚 | From June 1995 - March 1998 he was Ambassador Dushanbe.; From March 1998 - August 1998 he was Chinese Ambassador to Kyrgyzstan. | Li Peng | Abdujalil Samadov | March 1998 |
| March 1998 | Fu Quanzhang | 傅全章 | | Zhu Rongji | Yahyo Azimov | March 2001 |
| March 2001 | Wu Hongbin | 吴虹滨 | | Zhu Rongji | Oqil Oqilov | September 2005 |
| September 2005 | Li Huilai | 李惠来 | | Wen Jiabao | Oqil Oqilov | April 2007 |
| May 2007 | Zuo Xueliang | zh:左学良 | From March 2002 to April 2007 he was Chinese ambassador to Armenia.; From May 2007 to July 2010 he was Ambassador Dushanbe. | Wen Jiabao | Oqil Oqilov | July 2010 |
| July 2010 | Fan Xianrong | 范先荣 | | Wen Jiabao | Oqil Oqilov | December 2015 |
| December 2015 | Yue Bin | 岳斌 | | Li Keqiang | Kokhir Rasulzoda | November 2018 |
| December 2018 | Liu Bin | 刘彬 | | Li Keqiang | Kokhir Rasulzoda | September 2021 |
| March 2022 | Ji Shumin | 吉树民 | | Li Keqiang | Kokhir Rasulzoda | |

== See also ==
- China–Tajikistan relations
