= Embassy of China, Kyiv =

Coordinates: 50.444193°N 30.540750°E

Embassy of the People's Republic of China in Ukraine 中华人民共和国驻乌克兰大使馆
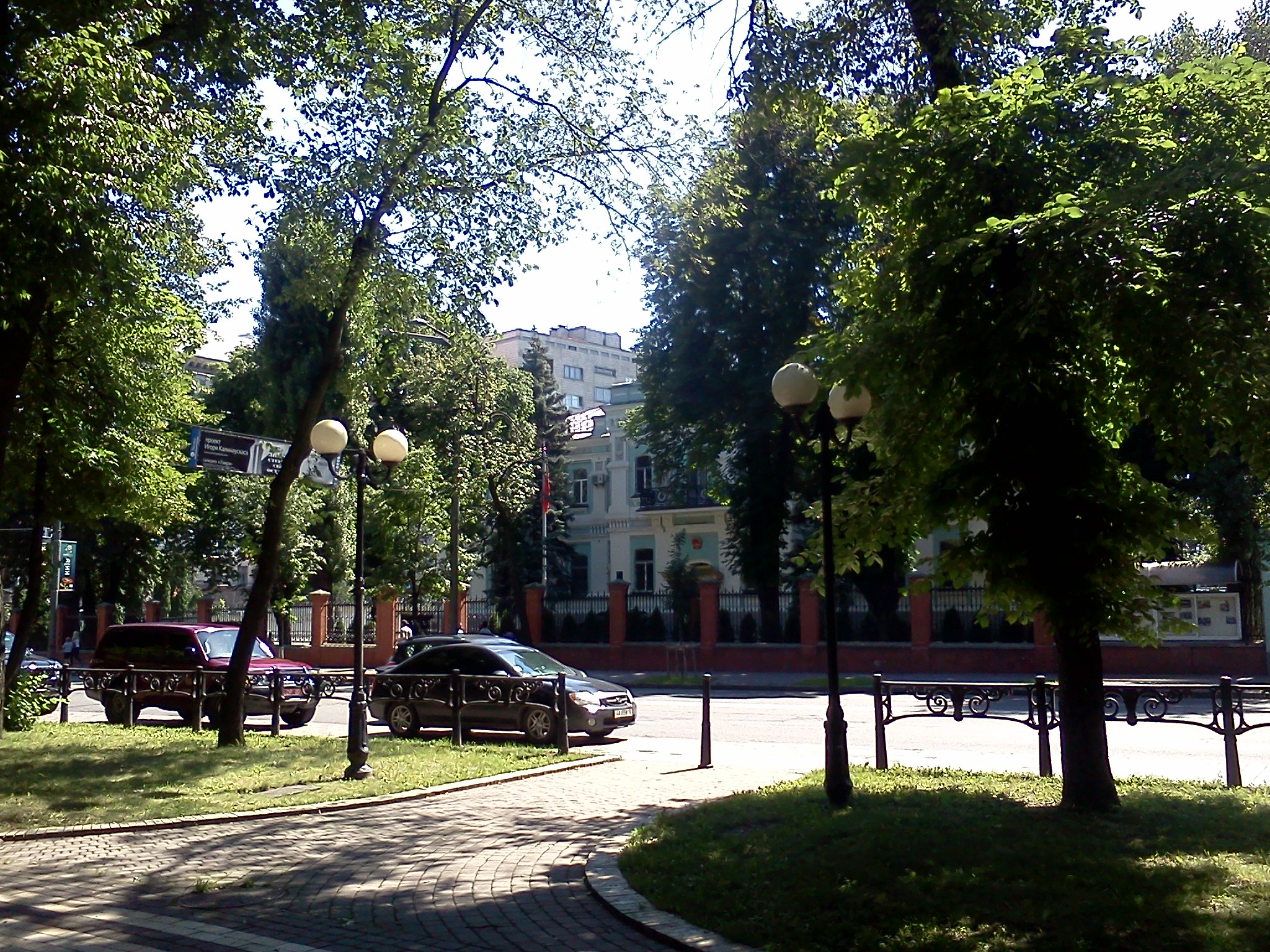
- Location: Kyiv
- Address: 32, Hrushevskoho str., Kyiv, 01901, Ukraine
- Ambassador: Ma Shengkun

The Embassy of the People's Republic of China in Ukraine (Ukrainian: Посольство Китайської Народної Республіки в Україні, romanized: Posolstvo Kytaiskoi Narodnoi Respubliky v Ukraini; Chinese: 中华人民共和国驻乌克兰大使馆) is the diplomatic mission of the People's Republic of China in Ukraine.

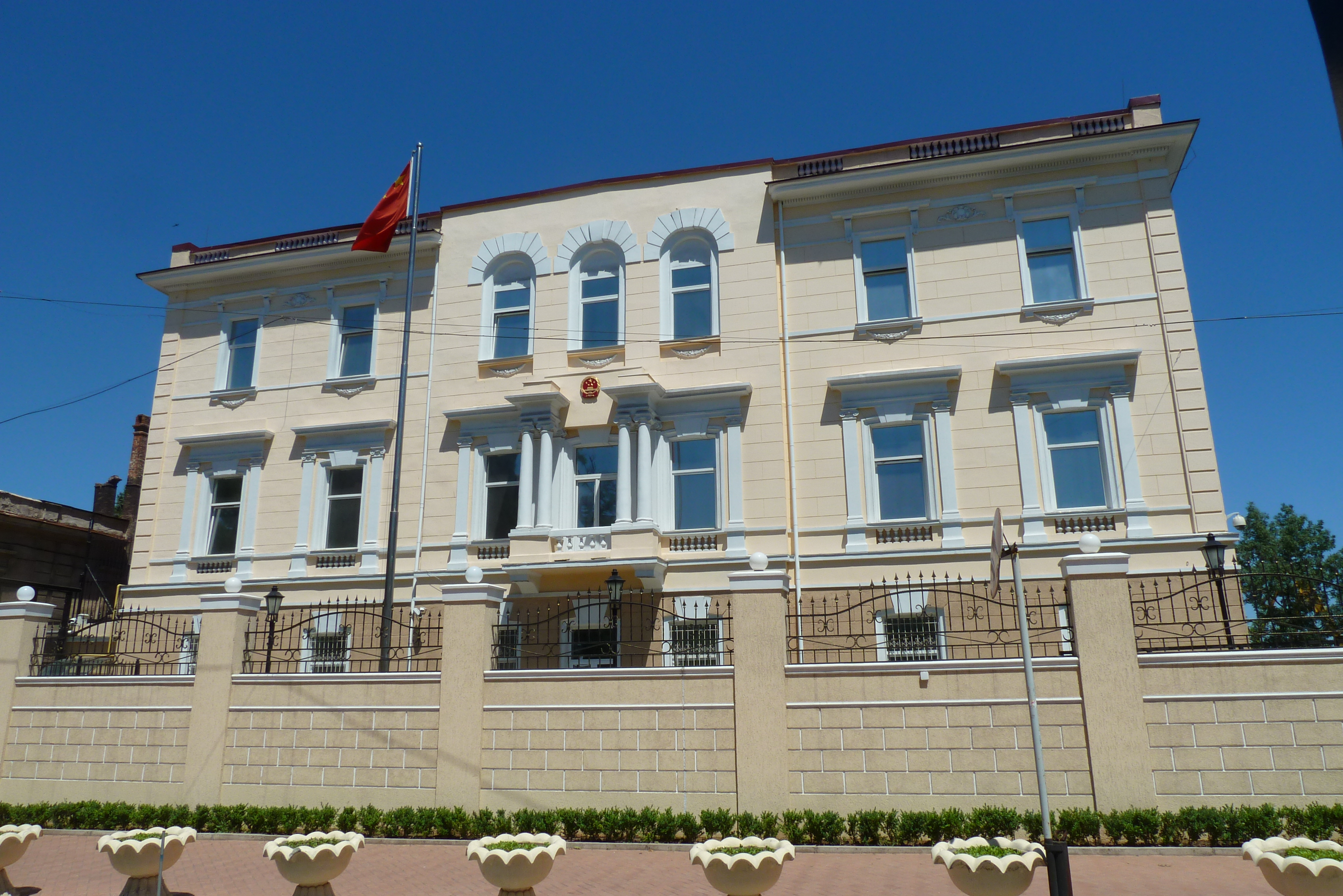
Consulate General of China in Odesa

== History ==
Following the Declaration of Independence of Ukraine on 24 August 1991, the People's Republic of China recognised Ukraine as a sovereign state on 27 December 1991.

Diplomatic relations between Ukraine and China were established on 4 January 1992.

The embassy relocated to Lviv in March 2022 due to the Russian invasion of Ukraine.

== Ambassador ==
The Chinese ambassador to Ukraine is the official representative of the People's Republic of China to Ukraine.

=== List of representatives ===
Diplomatic agrément Diplomatic accreditation	Ambassador	Chinese language zh:中国驻乌克兰大使列表	Ukrainian language uk:Посольство КНР в Україні	References	Premier of the People's Republic of China	List of presidents of Ukraine	Term end
May 1992	Zhang Zhen	zh:张震 (外交官)	uk:Чжан Чжень		Li Peng	Leonid Kuchma	March 1995
May 1995	Pan Zhanlin	zh:潘占林	uk:Пань Чжаньлінь		Li Peng	Leonid Kuchma	April 1998
July 1998	Zhou Xiaopei	zh:周晓沛	uk:Чжоу Сяопей		Zhu Rongji	Leonid Kuchma	October 2000
November 2000	Li Guobang	zh:李国邦	uk:Ле Гобан		Zhu Rongji	Leonid Kuchma	September 2003
November 2003	Yao Peisheng	zh:姚培生	uk:Яо Пейшен		Wen Jiabao	Leonid Kuchma	October 2005
November 2005	Gao Yusheng	zh:高玉生	uk:Гао Юйшен		Wen Jiabao	Viktor Yushchenko	January 2007
February 2007	Zhou Li	zh:周力 (1955年)	uk:Чжоу Лі		Wen Jiabao	Viktor Yushchenko	April 2010
July 2010	Zhang Xiyun	zh:张喜云	uk:Чжан Сіюнь		Wen Jiabao	Viktor Yushchenko	May 2016
June 2016	Du Wei	zh:杜伟 (1962年10月)	uk:Ду Вей		Li Keqiang	Petro Poroshenko	December 2019
February 2020	Fan Xianrong	zh:范先荣	uk:Фань Сяньжун		Li Keqiang	Volodymyr Zelenskyy	November 2024
November 2024	Ma Shengkun				Li Qiang	Volodymyr Zelenskyy	

== See also ==
- Embassy of Ukraine, Beijing
- China-Ukraine relations
- Foreign relations of China
- Foreign relations of Ukraine
- List of diplomatic missions in Ukraine
- List of diplomatic missions of China
