= Ma Shengkun =

- 马升琨
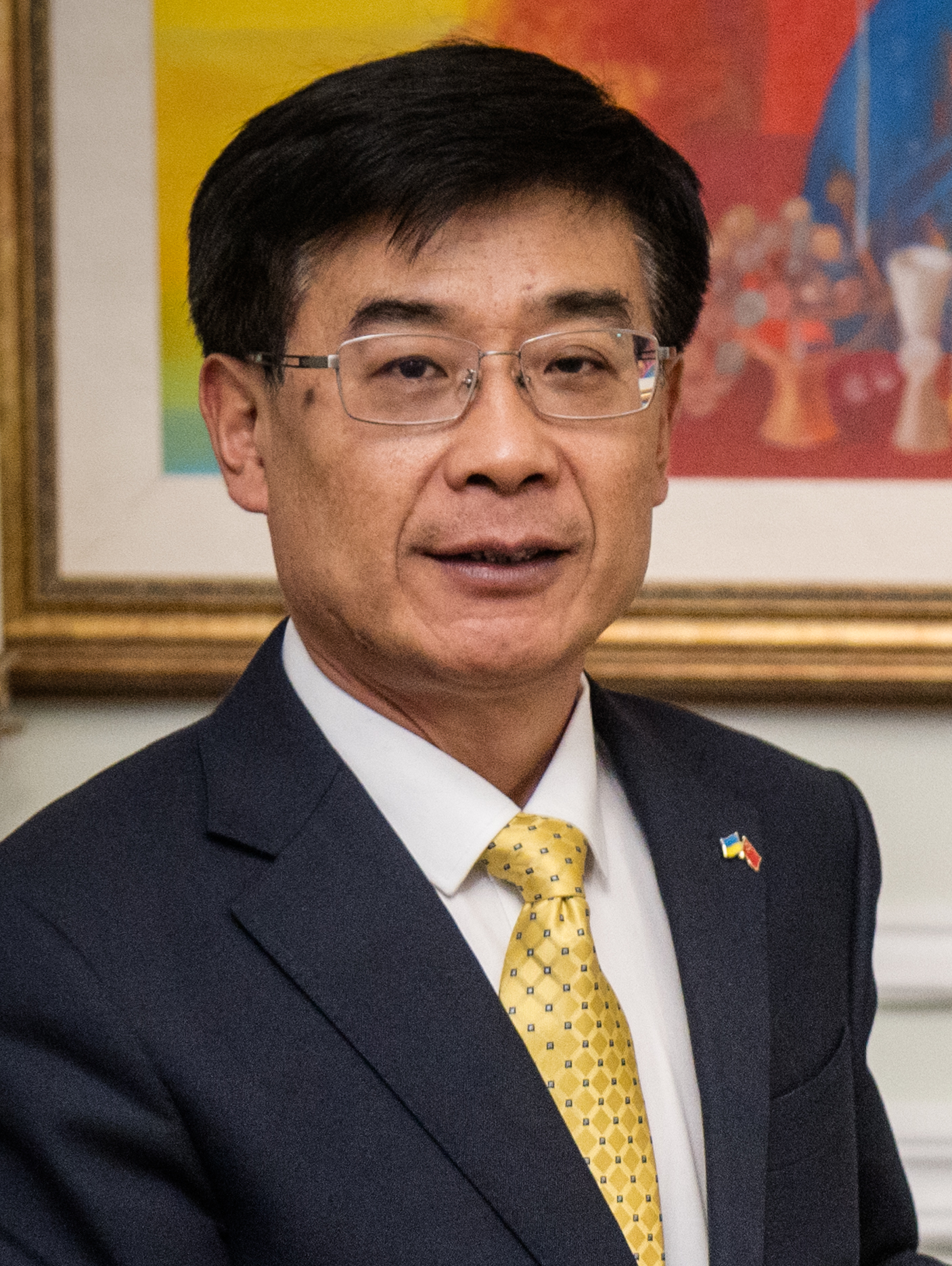
- Ma in 2024

Chinese Ambassador to Ukraine
- Incumbent
- Assumed office 26 November 2024
- President: Xi Jinping
- Preceded by: Fan Xianrong

Personal details
- Born: April 1969 (age 57) Qingzhou, Shandong, China
- Party: Chinese Communist Party
- Education: Weifang University; Ludong University; China Foreign Affairs University

Chinese name
- Simplified Chinese: 马升琨
- Traditional Chinese: 馬升琨
Transcriptions
Standard Mandarin
- Hanyu Pinyin: Mǎ Shēngkūn

Ma Shengkun (Chinese: 马升琨; born April 1969) is a Chinese diplomat, currently serving as Chinese ambassador to Ukraine.

== Biography ==
Ma was born in Qingzhou, Shandong, in April 1969, and graduated from Weifang University, Yantai Normal College (now Ludong University) and China Foreign Affairs University.

Upon joining the Ministry of Foreign Affairs, he was employed in the International Department, the Permanent Mission in Geneva, and the Arms Control Department. In 2019, he ascended to the position of Deputy Director of the Arms Control Department within the Ministry of Foreign Affairs. He was elevated to Deputy Director of the Department of Arms Control of the Ministry of Foreign Affairs of China in 2019.

On November 26, 2024, Chinese president Xi Jinping appointed Ma as Chinese ambassador to Ukraine, in accordance with the decision of the Standing Committee of the National People's Congress.

Diplomatic posts
Preceded by Fan Xianrong	Chinese Ambassador to Ukraine; 2024–present	Incumbent
