= Russians in China =

中国俄罗斯族 Pусские в Китае
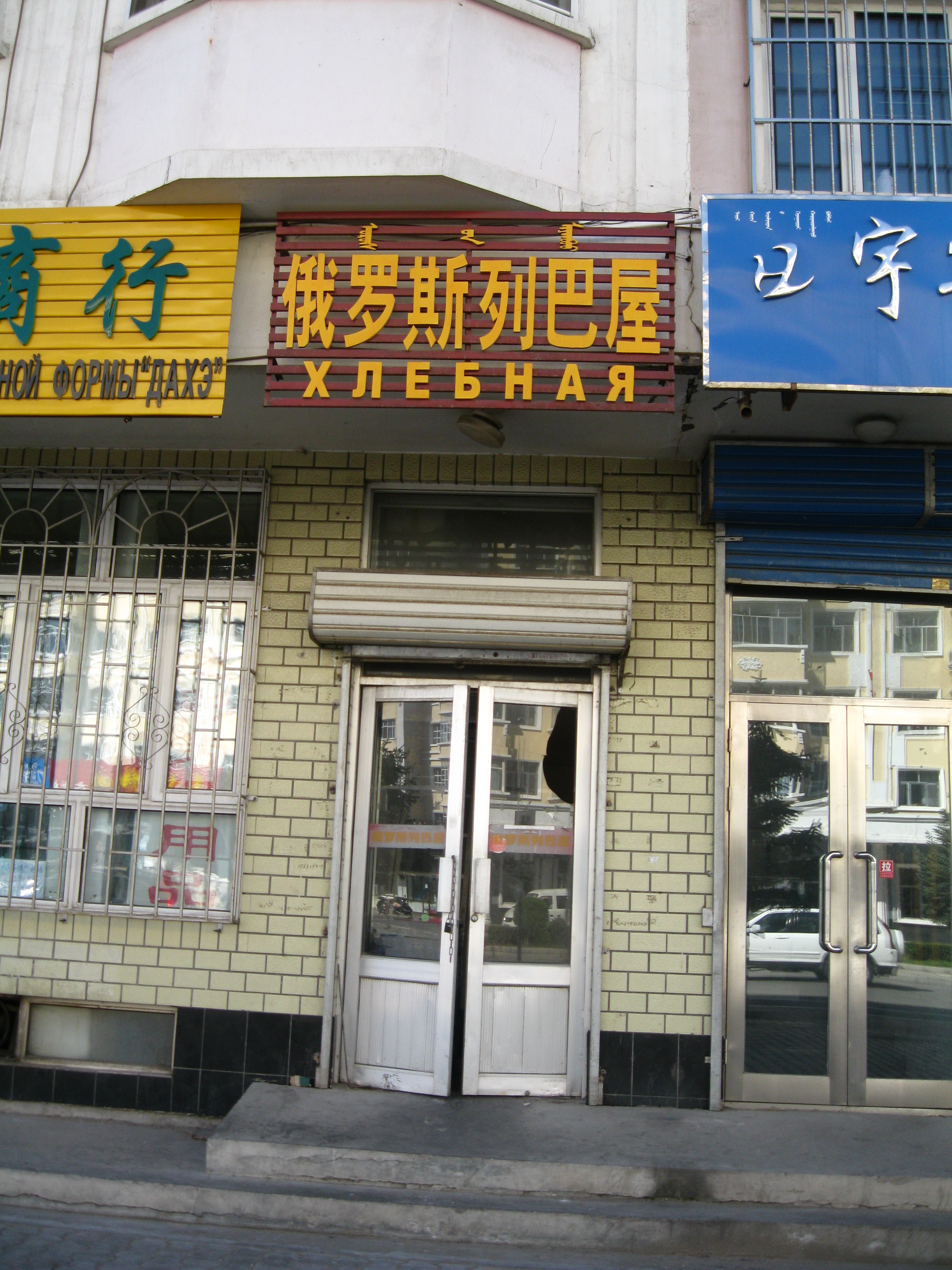
- Trilingual signage (Mongolian, Chinese, Russian) on a bread store in Manzhouli, Inner Mongolia, China

Total population
- 16,136 (2020 census)

Regions with significant populations
- Xinjiang, Inner Mongolia, Heilongjiang and other areas

Languages
- Russian, Chinese

Religion
- Predominantly Russian Orthodoxy and irreligion Minority Buddhism, Islam and Chinese folk religion

Related ethnic groups
- Russians in Hong Kong, Russians in Japan, Russians in Korea, Russians in Taiwan

Russians in China are one of the 56 ethnic groups officially recognised in the People's Republic of China. Enhe Russian Ethnic Township is the only ethnic township in China designated for China's Russian minority.

Russians have been living in China for centuries, the earliest being Cossacks that settled in China during the late 17th century. There are currently over 16,000 ethnic Russians in China. In the 1957 census, there were over 9,000 ethnic Russians. The 1978 census counted just 600 Russians, but the figure rose to 2,935 in the 1982 census and 13,504 in the 1990 census.

== History ==
=== Russians in Harbin ===
The first generation of Russians built the city from scratch. By 1913, Harbin had become an established Russian colony for the construction and maintenance work on the China Eastern Railway. A record shows Harbin had a total of 68,549 people, most of Russian and Chinese descent. There were a total of 53 different nationalities. Most of the Harbin population were of Russian and/or other European descent. Most were ethnic Russians including a minority of Germans, Ukrainians, Jews, and Poles.

In the decade from 1913 to 1923, Russia went through World War I, the Russian Revolution, and the Russian Civil War. In the 1920s Harbin was flooded with 100,000 to 200,000 White émigrés fleeing from Russia. Harbin held the largest Russian population outside of the state of Russia.

==== Chinese control and Japanese occupation ====
With Russian influence in Harbin coming to an end, Harbin had to live under Chinese and Japanese control for the next several decades.

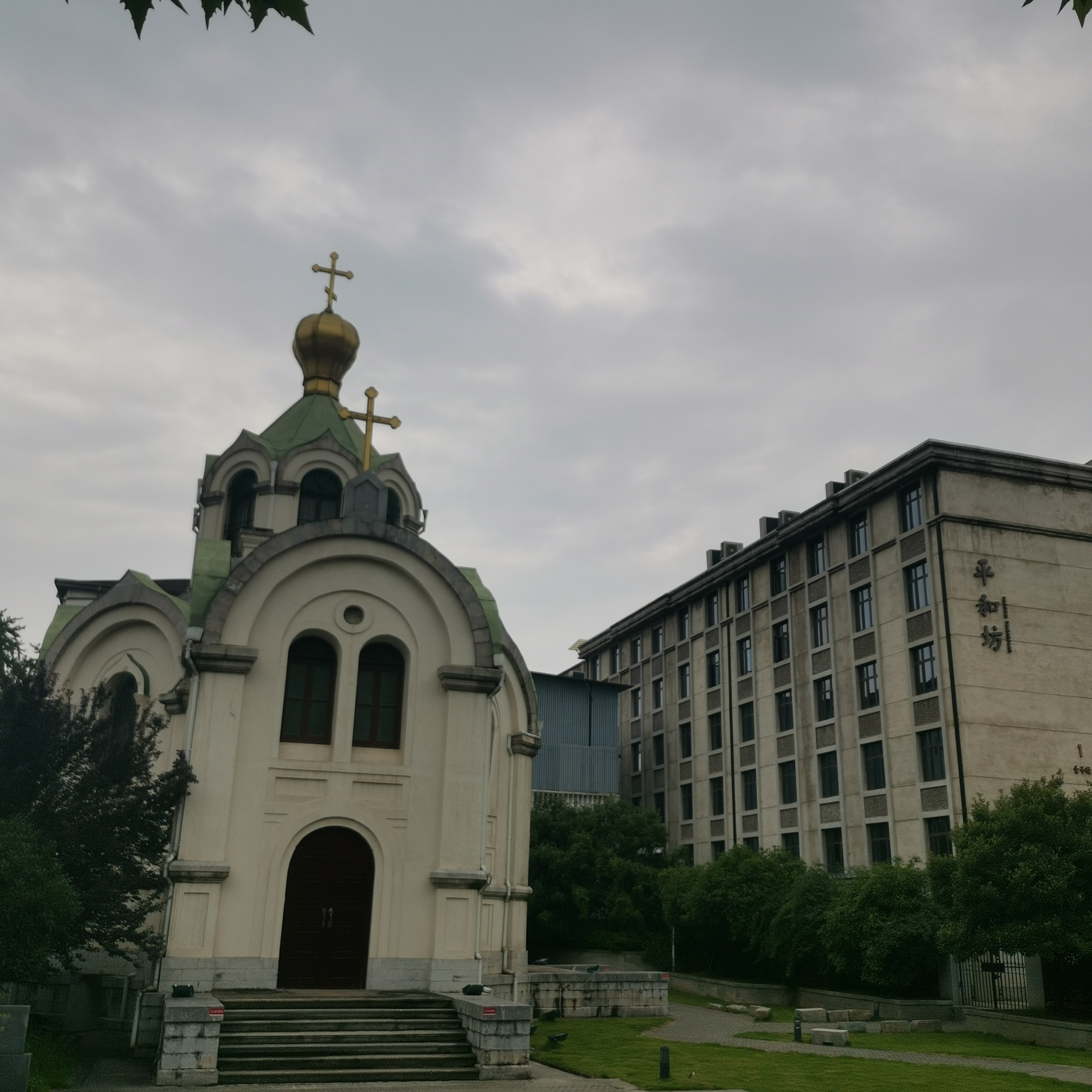
Church of Alexander Nevsky, an Orthodox church built by the Russian community in Hankow in 1895.

In 1920, the Republic of China announced that it would no longer recognize the Russian consulates in China. On September 23, China ceased relations with representatives of the Russian Empire and deprived Russians of extraterritorial rights. The Chinese government took control of institutions in Harbin such as courts, police, prison, post office, and some research and educational institutions.

From 1932 to 1945, Harbin Russians had a difficult time under the Manchukuo régime and the Japanese occupation of Manchuria. Some Harbin Russians initially welcomed the occupation, hoping that the Japanese would help them in their anti-Soviet struggles and provide protection from the Chinese, who were desperately trying to restore their sovereignty over Harbin.

=== Russians in Xinjiang ===
==== Russian migrations ====
During the late 17th century, the Russian Empire launched several military actions against the Qing Dynasty. Some of the captives were incorporated into the Eight Banners. During the Battle of Yagsi, nearly 100 Russians surrendered to the Qing authorities, and the Kangxi Emperor authorized them to join the Bordered Yellow Banner. Their descendants exist to this day and are known as Albazinians.

From 1860 to 1884, many Russians came to Hulun Buir panning for gold. In 1900, Russian troops entered China, and destroyed several sentries. By 1907 there were already 1,000 households of Russian settlers in the Ergun Right Banner.

The earliest Russian immigrants who came to Xinjiang were the Kerjaks (кержаки in Russian, Old Believers), who were persecuted under the reign of Peter the Great for refusing to convert to the Russian Orthodox Church. They sent four heralds to negotiate with the Kazakh chief Kala Usman and they were allowed to settle down in Burqin. After several years, they also pioneered some settlements in Kanas, Chuguchak, and Ili. In 1861, 160 Kerjaks entered the area of Lop Nur to settle down.

Almost all the Kerjaks were devout Christians; they rarely communicated with other groups. According to the census in 1943, there were 1,200 Kerjaks in Bulqin and Kaba. Many moved to Australia after the establishment of the People's Republic of China.

In 1851, the Treaty of Kulja was established and many Russian merchants swarmed into Xinjiang. The Russian merchants killed approximately 200 mineworkers at Chuguchak, which enraged the local people, who burned the Russian trade circle down under the lead of two Hui men Xu Tianrao and An Yuxian. As a result, the Russians forced the Qing government to pay heavy war reparations. In 1871, the Russian Empire conquered the area of Ili and many Russian merchants migrated there.

An anti-Russian uproar broke out when Russian customs officials, three Cossacks, and a Russian courier invited local Uyghur prostitutes to a party in January 1902 in Kashgar. This caused a massive brawl by the inflamed local Uyghur populace against the Russians on the pretext of protecting Muslim women because anti-Russian sentiment had built up. Even though morality was not strict in Kashgar, the local Uyghurs clashed violently with the Russians before they were dispersed. The Chinese sought to end the tensions to avoid giving the Russians a pretext to invade.

After the riot, the Russians sent troops to Sarikol in Tashkurghan and demanded that the Sarikol postal services be placed under Russian supervision, the locals of Sarikol believed that the Russians would seize the entire district from the Chinese and send more soldiers even after the Russians tried to negotiate with the Begs of Sarikol and sway them to their side, they failed since the Sarikoli officials and authorities demanded in a petition to the Amban of Yarkand that they be evacuated to Yarkand to avoid being harassed by the Russians and objected to the Russian presence in Sarikol, the Sarikolis did not believe the Russian claim that they would leave them alone and only involved themselves in the mail service.

When the White Army was defeated in the war against the Bolsheviks, many Cossacks and other refugees fled to Xinjiang under the lead of General Ivanov. Some of them rioted in Ili and Chuguchak but were finally suppressed by the Chinese warlord Yang Zengxin. Part of them later joined the Guihua soldiers recruited by the Xinjiang government.

From 1931 to 1938, the Soviet government forced a lot of Chinese and their Russian relatives to move to China. More than 20,000 Russians entered China through the Crossings of Xinjiang and after 1941, many refugees fled to Xinjiang.

==== Xinjiang Russians under the reign of Yang Zengxin, Jin Shuren and Sheng Shicai ====
Under the reign of Yang Zengxin, the Russians in Xinjiang were mainly divided into 3 parts: some of the refugees had joined the Chinese nationality, were called "Guihua ren" (Chinese: 歸化人, lit. "Naturalized people") and had to fill out applications and write volunteer certificates. Yang ordered officials from various regions to distribute land for them, and gave them farm animals and seeds. Some had joined the USSR nationality. Others refused to join either nationality.

In 1928, when Jin Shuren came to power, he strengthened supervision and taxation of the Russians. Freedom of movement and trade were curtailed. According to the records from Xinjiang Gazette, from 1930 to 1931 there were 207 Russians who went through the Guihua procedure in Ürümqi and 288 in Chuguchak.

In 1933, Jin abdicated. In 1935, the 2nd People's Congress was held and the Guihua people were officially recognized as a minority group of Xinjiang.

Besides damage done by previous European explorers, White movement bandits escaping from the Russian Civil War were responsible for vandalizing much of the Buddhist art at the Mogao Grottoes. They had caused trouble in Xinjiang, but were defeated when they tried to attack Qitai. The Governor of Xinjiang, Yang Zengxin, arranged for them to be transported to Dunhuang at the Mogao Grottoes, after talks with Governor Lu Hongtao of Gansu. The bandits wrote profanities on Buddhist statues, destroyed or damaged paintings, gouging out eyes and amputating the limbs of the statues, in addition to committing arson. This damage can still be seen to this day.

In 1931, the Kumul Rebellion broke out in Xinjiang and the Province Army was defeated by Ma Zhongying's troops. So Jin Shuren ordered Zhang Peiyuan to form the Guihua army. The conscripted Russians were organized as the 1st Guihua Cavalry under the regimental commander Mogutnov. Later the cavalry were expanded into two groups, with Antonov and Bapingut as the commanders. Zhang Peiyuan commanded the Guihua Army and the Province Army finally defeated Ma's army, reoccupied Zhenxi and raised the siege of Hami. In 1932, the peasants of Turpan rebelled under the lead of Makhsut, but were beaten down by Guihua Army. Near the Chinese New Year Eve of 1933, the capital Ürümqi was besieged by Ma Shimin's units during the Battle of Urumqi (1933), Jin Shuren formed the 2nd Guihua Cavalry and repulsed them.

The Guihua soldiers were unhappy with Jin's arrears of military expenditures. Several Jin dissenters persuaded Pappengut and Antonov to launch a coup d'état, and they occupied the city defense command on the afternoon of April 12. Later Jin Shuren fled to the outskirts. At the same night, they established the Interim Sustain Committee and sent liaison officers to contact Sheng Shicai. Later that night Jin's troops fought back, but were finally defeated and Jin had to return to give up his office, more than 70 Russians died in that battle.

When Ma Zhongying heard that the coup had taken place in Xinjiang, he promptly led the army to the west and sent his general Ma Heying to Altay. In May 1933, the Russian and Kazakh peasants of Bulqin armed themselves to fight against Ma's army, but were forced to give ground. Sheng ordered Guihua colonel Helovsky to reinforce them, and defeated Ma Heying after two days. In June 1933, Sheng Shicai and Ma Zhongying fought a decisive battle at Ziniquan, Ma was defeated, and was forced to flee to Turpan.

Zhang Peiyuan then defected and joined forces with Ma Zhongying. Together, they almost defeated Sheng Shicai at the Battle of Urumqi (1933–34). During the Soviet invasion of Xinjiang, however, the Soviets intervened on the side of the Provincial government and the Guihua White Russians, and Ma Zhongying ended up in control of southern Xinjiang while the provincial government controlled the north.

Georg Vasel, a Nazi German agent, was told "Must I tell him that I am a Russian? You know how the Tungans hate the Russians." by his driver, a White Russian when meeting Dungan (Hui) Ma Zhongying.

In the 1930s, during the Kumul Rebellion, the traveler Ahmad Kamal was asked by Uyghur men if the veils donned by Turki women in Xinjiang were also worn by women in America (Amerikaluk). The label of "whores" (Jilops) was used for Russian (Russ) and American (Amerikaluk) women by Uyghur men when what these women wore in public while bathing and the fact that no veil was worn by them was described by Ahmad Kamal to the Turki men. Chinese swines and Russ infidels was a saying by Turki Muslims (Uyghurs) in Xinjiang. Anti Russian hatred was spouted by Tungans (Hui Muslims) to the adventurer Ahmad Kamal in Xinjiang. Ahmad Kamal saw Russians in the bazar at Aksu. he saw Russian soldiers and Russian girls in the bazar at Urumchi.

In the summer of 1934, when the war ended pro tempore, Sheng retracted the Guihua Headquarters, and selected about 500 Russians to form the 6th Cavalry to quarter at Ürümqi. In 1937, the Cavalry and the Red Army finally defeated Ma Hushan's troops during the Islamic rebellion in Xinjiang (1937). And later it was disbanded, all the Guihua soldiers became ordinary people. The White Russians again sided with the Soviets during the Ili Rebellion in 1944.

During the Ili Rebellion, American telegrams reported that the Soviet secret police threatened to assassinate Muslim leaders from Ining and put pressure on them to flee to "inner China" via Tihwa (Ürümqi), White Russians grew fearful of Uyghur Muslim mobs as they chanted, "We freed ourselves from the yellow men, now we must destroy the white."

==== After World War II ====
In the last days of World War II, the USSR entered the war against Japan and invaded western China. In doing so, Soviet forces encountered, to their surprise, Russian Old Believer villages. Many of the Old Believer men were taken back to Russia and imprisoned. Those who stayed found their way of life drastically changed and they often sought ways to leave China. The Red Cross and World Council of Churches learned of the Old Believers' plight and came to their aid, helping them gather in Hong Kong and prepare for resettlement. Those from Manchuria and some from Sinkiang went to Brazil. Others from Sinkiang went to Argentina and a few went to Australia. The receiving countries offered them refugee assistance, including land, equipment, building materials and food.

One group aboard a ship stopped for a few days in Los Angeles, California, which since 1905 had been the center of a large community of Spiritual Christians from Russia. The Pryguny who recently immigrated via Iran rushed to the port and offered to host the Old Believers at their homes and prayer halls. In the process, addresses were exchanged. Later, once settled in South America, the elders used these addresses to contact potential sponsors, and eventually came to Los Angeles, with recommendations to go north to Oregon. Pryguny in Oregon agreed to advise them in settlement. Later on, the Sinkiang Old Believers in South America also joined the growing Old Believer community in Oregon. Therefore, a number of Russian Old Believers now live in Willamette Valley, Oregon.

Some Russians found employment and remained in China: as late as 1969, an Australian journalist in the region identified a "Kazakh cavalry regiment of the People's Republic of China — Chinese Cossacks — stationed in the foothills of the Tien Shan".

=== Russians at the Argun ===
The Tryokhrechye (Russian: Трёхречье, IPA: [trʲɵxˈrʲet͡ʃjɪ] 'Three-River Country', Chinese: 三河, Sānhé) designates a region of former Russian settlement in the northeast of Inner Mongolia, in the present-day city-prefecture of Hulunbuir, at the border with Russia, of roughly 11,500 km^{2} size. It takes its name from the three rivers Gan, Derbul and Khaul that descend from the heavily forested Khingan Mountains in the East and join the border river Argun in the West. In the North, there are dense Taiga forests, in the South – the open steppe around Hailar. While the region is naturally separated from Manchuria by the Khingan, it is quite open to Russian territory across the Argun as the river freezes in winter and presents many fords and islands even in summer.

While soils on the left Russian bank of the Argun are poor, those in the Trekhrechye are fertile, enabling agriculture as known in Russia proper. Forests in the east provided wood and game, the steppe to the South offered ample pasture.

The Argun river served as a Sino-Russian border since the 1689 treaty of Nerchinsk but was hardly policed in a meaningful way. While the Russians erected Cossack posts (ostrogi) in the Transbaikal region, the Qing dynasty was for a long time not interested in development of their side of the border.

After the Decembrist revolt of 1825, political prisoners were sent to the Nerchinsk area. Some of them are said to have escaped from Katorga (penal labor) across the river and to have married indigenous women. Since the 1870s, Cossacks began grazing their cattle on the Chinese side, first along the Khaul river which is closest to Russia, only a day's ride away from the Russian settlements. They erected simple shelters for haymaking in summer and autumn and for hunting in winter. Already before 1900, some of these cattle stations began to coalesce into the first villages, like Manerka (Russian: Манерка) at the lower Khaul.

These settlers were tolerated by Chinese officials, usually themselves from nomadic groups (e.g. Mongols, Solons). Han Chinese, which would have preferred farming like the Russians, were at first not allowed to settle here. Around 1900, there were only a few Chinese shopkeepers in the area, selling alcohol and tobacco. The latter became much more profitable after the introduction of customs controls in 1900 and especially with the end of the 50-verst free trade zone along the border.

The Qing authorities unsuccessfully tried to encourage Han farmers to settle there, but from 1905, they replaced indigenous officials with Han men, much to the chagrin of the Mongols. After the revolutionary turmoil of 1911, China struggled to reassert control of the Hulunbuir area which was partially achieved in 1915, fully only in 1920.

==== The Russian Civil War and its aftermath ====
The Russian Civil War and its aftermath changed the make-up of the Trekhrechye Russian community. Four waves of immigrants might be distinguished: firstly, the Cossacks which had lived on the Russian side on the Argun and now settled down on the Chinese side; secondly, other refugees of the civil war from the remainder of Transbaikal, many hoping to return soon; thirdly, the largest wave of refugees from Soviet collectivization, starting in 1929 (known as the tridtsatniki '1930-ers'); and lastly, laid-off employees of the Chinese Eastern Railway, which was run largely by Russians up until that time. As a result of these, ethnic Russians represented more than 80% of this region's population in the late 1930s to the early 1940s.

The Cossack settlers organized an administration of their own, consisting of village elders, with a chief elder in the village of Suchye (Russian: Сучье), where there was also a Chinese district chief. Chinese authorities attempted to assimilate the emigrants in the 1920s by introducing passports, raising taxes, prohibiting Orthodox feast days. When the archbishop of Harbin visited Dragotsenka in 1926, he was arrested.

Population estimates for the Tryokhrechye by ethnic groups (Note: The numbers have been compiled by Sören Urbansky (Der Kosake als Lehrer oder Exot? Fragen an einen Mandschukuo-Dokumentarfilm über die bäuerliche russische Diaspora am Grenzfluss Argun', 2014) and stem from different sources. For 1928: V. A. Kormazov: Èkonomičeskij očerk. Harbin 1928, pp. 50 f. For 1933: V. A. Anučin: Geografičeskie očerki Man'čžurii. Moskau 1948. Anučin claims to rely on research by Kormazov. For 1945: Julija Argudjaeva: Russkoe naselenie v Trechreč'e. In: Rossija i ATR (2004), vol. 4, p. 126. For 1955 and 1972: V. N. Žernakov: Trechreč'e. Oakland (Ca.) no year, p. 4. From the private archive of Olga Bakich, Toronto. For 1990: E'erguna you qi zhi [Chronicle of the Right Argun banner]. Haila'er 1993, pp. 106 and 127. These very high numbers published by Chinese authorities for 1990 are especially problematic and unrealistic, given the fact that members of minorities are entitled to privileges in education and family policies.)
Year	Total population	Density per km^{2}	Russians	Han Chinese	others
1928	2,330	0,2	2,130	200	
1933	–	–	5,519	–	–
1945	ca. 13,100	0,9	ca. 11,000	ca. 1,100	ca. 1,000
1955	–	–	ca. 3,000	–	–
1972	–	–	23	–	–
1990	ca. 50,000	4,3	"Ethnic Russians": 1,748; "Mixed" (polukrovtsy): 3,468	–	–

At its height, there were 21 Russian villages in the Three-River Country, with Dragotsenka (Russian: Драгоценка, modern Sanhexiang Chinese: 三河鄕) as its political and socioeconomic center. Dragotsenka counted only 450 inhabitants in 1933 but grew to 3,000 in 1944. Only half of those inhabitants were Russians whereas there lived 1,000 Chinese and 500 Japanese. (Most of the other villages were almost exclusively inhabited by Russians.) There was also a 500-strong garrison nearby. It was the seat of the head cossack, responsible for the Russians in the area, as well as the seat of regional police and a Japanese military mission. There was a small power station, a refinery for vegetable oil, a steel-rolling mill, a dairy factory, auto repair shops, saddleries, leather and felt factories, a post and telegraph office, a bank, and branches of national trading houses. Most of the Chinese worked in small own businesses. The Russian community could find here its only high school in the area, the seat of the Russian Association and the local branch of the nationwide Office for the Russian Emigrants' Affairs (BREM) which published the weekly newspaper The Cossack Life (Russian: Казачья Жизнь).

To Soviet visitors of the late 1940s, the Tryokhrechye villages seemed like curious, almost museum-like images of life in prerevolutionary Siberia. The villages were grouped around long straight streets and consisted of blockhouses made of larch wood, facing south, with ocher-painted floors. A similar archaism prevailed in religion and customs. The Russian Orthodox Church continued to play a central role. In addition to St. Peter and Paul's Church in Dragotsenka, there were nine other village churches and one monastery. With regards to traditions, people would e.g. strew flour into their hallways nine days after Easter and check the next morning whether their dead parents had returned. On Whitmonday, the Cossacks washed and consecrated their horses.

During the Soviet intervention for the Chinese Eastern Railway, the Red Army led punitive expeditions into the Tryokhrechye in August and September 1929. It was reported that 150 emigrants were killed, and that there was a wave of refugees to Harbin. For some time before, White units had made small-scale raids onto Soviet territory. The Russian diaspora proved to be well-connected: The Russians of Shanghai pleaded to US President Hoover in a telegram to put an end to "the bloody nightmare of the Red henchmen".

==== Japanese occupation and World War II ====
In this climate of anti-Soviet fear, the Three-River Russians initially welcomed the Japanese invasion. In December 1932, they greeted the new "era of order and justice" and promised their cooperation. Japan permitted a certain degree of cultural autonomy for minorities like the Russians, mainly to counter the numerically dominant Han Chinese in their new puppet state, Manchukuo. Russian language propaganda of Manchukuo painted local life in idyllic colors.

This initial optimism was weakened by strict Japanese surveillance. The main tool for this was the BREM with which they had to register. In 1944, the BREM district for the Khingan (incl. Tryokhrechye) was the second largest by members (21,202) after Harbin (39,421). The BREM organized local propaganda and indoctrination, especially for Russian youth, and the celebrations for March 1, Manchukuo's national holiday. From 1937 onwards, control of the border region was intensified, and from the 1940s, traveling to and settling in the region required a permit. This increased the isolation of the community.

Japanese general Kenji Doihara forced White Russian women into prostitution and drug addiction to spy and spread drugs to their male Chinese clients. He initially gave food and shelter to tens of thousands Russian White émigré women who had taken refuge in the Far East after the defeat of the White Russian anti-Bolshevik movement during the Russian Civil War and the withdrawal of the Entente and Japanese armies from Siberia. Having lost their livelihoods, and with most of them widowed, Doihara forced the women into prostitution, using them to create a network of brothels throughout China where they worked under inhuman conditions. The use of heroin and opium was promoted to them as a way to tolerate their miserable fate. Once addicted, the women were used to further spread the use of opium among the Chinese population by earning one free opium pipe for every six they were selling to Chinese customers.

Japanese scientists conducted human experiments on White Russian men, women and children by gassing, injecting and vivisecting them in Unit 731 and Unit 100. There were multiple Russian victims of Unit 731 and testimonies and records show that a Russian girl and her mother were gassed and one Russian man was cut into two and preserved with formaldehyde.

Some children grew up inside the walls of Unit 731, infected with syphilis. A Youth Corps member deployed to train at Unit 731 recalled viewing a batch of subjects that would undergo syphilis testing: "one was a White Russian woman with a daughter of four or five years of age, and the last was a White Russian woman with a boy of about six or seven." The children of these women were tested in ways similar to their parents, with specific emphasis on determining how longer infection periods affected the effectiveness of treatments.

Senior Sergeant Kazuo Mitomo described some of Unit 100's human experiments:

"On some of the prisoners I experimented 5-6 times, testing the action of Korean bindweed, bactal and castor oil seeds. One of the prisoners of Russian nationality became so exhausted from the experiments that no more could be performed on him, and Matsui ordered me to kill that Russian by giving him an injection of potassium cyanide. After the injection, the man died at once. Bodies were buried in the unit's cattle cemetery."

Unit 100 staff poisoned and drugged Russians with heroin, castor oil, tobacco and other substances for weeks at a time. Some died during the experimentation. When survivors were determined to no longer be useful for experimentation and were complaining of illness, staff told them they would receive a shot of medicine, but instead executed them with potassium cyanide injections. Executions were also carried out by gunshots.

The small Russian community beyond the Argun drew a disproportionate interest of Japanese imperial researchers: ethnographers, anthropologists, agronomists. The number of their publication exceeds the Russian and Chinese ones by far, and much of what we know about the community comes from Japanese research. They described Cossacks and their way of dealing with the harsh climate as potential models for the settlement of Japanese in Manchuria.

With the Soviet invasion in 1945, the secret service (NKVD) entered the area and arrested about a quarter of the male population, especially the larger number of the tridtsatniki, which were deported to the Gulag. The other residents received Soviet passports. In autumn 1949, the farms of the remaining Russians were forcibly collectivized. Most of them were repatriated to the Soviet Union over the following years, with the last significant wave going to Kazakhstan from 1955 to 1956; Chinese farmers took over the vacated areas. Most of the Russians who stayed, emigrated to Australia or Latin America after the Chinese government permitted them to do so in 1962. The few remaining Russians relocated back to the left riverbank during the Cultural Revolution. During the Cultural Revolution, Red Guards destroyed Russian Orthodox churches. Soviet citizens were not harassed but those of mixed ancestry (polukrovtsy 'half-bloods') were accused of espionage, often tortured and killed. Speaking Russian was forbidden during this time.

=== Genetics ===
Many local Russians in China are of mixed Russian and Chinese ancestry due to intermarriage; this is evident in genetic studies that were conducted on them. Russians in China that migrated to China after the 18th century absorbed local East Asian males marrying Russian females into their population, with one sample showing most of the Russians had European mtDNA, though East Asian haplogroup O made up 58% of their Y haplogroup. O3-M122 specifically made up 47% of the Russian sample. The East Asian Y haplogroup O3-M122 was found in 47% of Russian males in China. In another test the East Asian paternal Y Haplogroup O made up 58% of Russian males samples in China, while European-origin mitochondrial DNA predominated in the Russian population in China, showing that the ethnic Russian population receive male East Asian paternal lineages.

O3-M122 is the commonly shared genetic signature of Sino-Tibetan speaking ethnicities.

== Current status ==
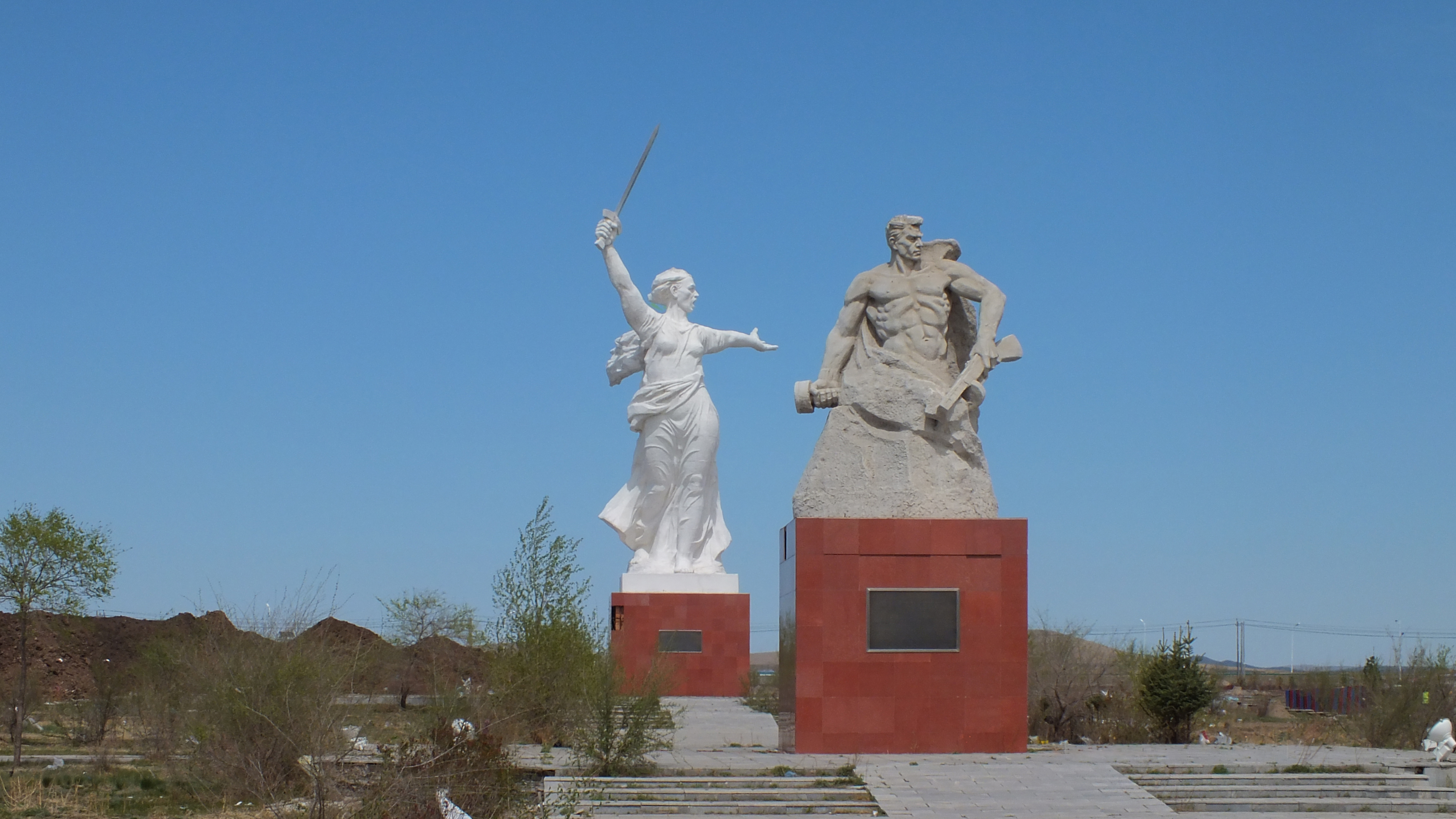
A replica of The Motherland Calls in Manchuria

The 1957 census counted over 9,000 ethnic Russians in China, while the 1978 census counted just 600. That number rose again to 2,935 in the 1982 census and 13,504 in the 1990 census, mostly in northern Xinjiang and Inner Mongolia. Some of them live in Enhe and Shiwei, the only Russian ethnic townships in China. Beijing's Yabaolu commercial district also maintains a visible Russian (specifically Siberian) presence due to its active fur trade and import market, although business has deteriorated since the Russian financial crisis of 2014.

There continues to be disagreement over the number of ethnic Russians living in China. Statistics as of the 2002 Census are shown below. Pink designates native region.

Area	Total Population	Russians in China (Eluosi Zu)	Proportion of all Russians in China (%)	Russians as proportion of local minority population	Russians as proportion of total local population (%）
Total	1,245,110,826	15,631	100	0.0148	0.00126
31 Province area	1,242,612,226	15,609	99.86	0.0148	0.00126
Northwest China	89,258,221	9,128	58.40	0.0523	0.01023
North China	145,896,933	5,406	34.59	0.0620	0.00371
Northeast China	104,864,179	479	3.06	0.0044	0.00046
East China	358,849,244	271	1.73	0.0108	0.00008
South Central China	350,658,477	182	1.16	0.0006	0.00005
Southwest China	193,085,172	143	0.91	0.0004	0.00007
Xinjiang	18,459,511	8,935	57.16	0.0815	0.04840
Inner Mongolia	23,323,347	5,020	32.12	0.1033	0.02152
Heilongjiang	36,237,576	265	1.70	0.0150	0.00073
Beijing	13,569,194	216	1.38	0.0369	0.00159
Liaoning	41,824,412	150	0.96	0.0022	0.00036
Hebei	66,684,419	102	0.65	0.0035	0.00015
Shanghai	16,407,734	76	0.49	0.0732	0.00046
Shaanxi	35,365,072	69	0.44	0.0391	0.00020
Shandong	89,971,789	68	0.44	0.0108	0.00008
Jiangsu	73,043,577	67	0.43	0.0258	0.00009
Jilin	26,802,191	64	0.41	0.0026	0.00024
Tianjin	9,848,731	60	0.38	0.0225	0.00061
Gansu	25,124,282	55	0.35	0.0025	0.00022
Henan	91,236,854	54	0.35	0.0047	0.00006
Guangdong	85,225,007	50	0.32	0.0039	0.00006
Sichuan	82,348,296	48	0.31	0.0012	0.00006
Qinghai	4,822,963	48	0.31	0.0022	0.00100
Yunnan	42,360,089	32	0.20	0.0002	0.00008
Guizhou	35,247,695	31	0.20	0.0002	0.00009
Hubei	59,508,870	26	0.17	0.0010	0.00004
Hunan	63,274,173	25	0.16	0.0004	0.00004
Anhui	58,999,948	22	0.14	0.0055	0.00004
Zhejiang	45,930,651	21	0.13	0.0053	0.00005
Ningxia	5,486,393	21	0.13	0.0011	0.00038
Tibet Autonomous Region	2,616,329	20	0.13	0.0008	0.00076
Hainan	7,559,035	14	0.09	0.0011	0.00019
Fujian	34,097,947	13	0.08	0.0022	0.00004
Guangxi	43,854,538	13	0.08	0.0001	0.00003
Chongqing	30,512,763	12	0.08	0.0006	0.00004
Shanxi	32,471,242	8	0.05	0.0078	0.00002
Jiangxi	40,397,598	4	0.03	0.0032	0.00001
In active duty	2,498,600	22	0.14	0.0197	0.00088

== Notable people ==
- Ivan Polinov (died c. 1960s), military officer in the armies of the Russian Empire, Xinjiang Clique, and East Turkestan Republic
- Fotiy Leskin (1913–1970), military officer who commanded units in the East Turkestan National Army and then the People's Liberation Army
- Yelizaveta Kishkina (1914–2015), wife of Li Lisan and niece of the last prime minister of the Russian Empire
- Chiang Fang-liang (1916–2004), First Lady of the Republic of China from 1978 to 1988
- Lin Hu (1927–2018), fighter pilot, lieutenant general, and deputy commander of the PLA Air Force
- Nikolai Lunev, deputy to the tenth Chinese People's Political Consultative Conference
- Misha Ge, Uzbekistani figure skater of Russian, Chinese, and Korean descent who had Chinese nationality from 2001 to 2010

== See also ==
- Harbin Russians
- Shanghai Russians
- Russians in Hong Kong
- China Far East Railway
- Chinese Eastern Railway Zone
- Grigory Semyonov
- Tatars in China
- Chinese Orthodox Church
- China–Russia relations
- Chinese people in Russia
- Russians in Japan
- Russians in Korea
