= Li Qingyu =

Chinese diplomat

Li Qingyu (Chinese: 李清玉) was a Chinese diplomat. He was Ambassador of the People's Republic of China to Syria (1993–1995) and Algeria (1995–1999).

Preceded by Zhang Zhen	Ambassador of China to Syria; 1993–1995	Succeeded by Wu Minmin
Preceded by Wang Jianbang	Ambassador of China to Algeria; 1995–1999	Succeeded by Zheng Aquan
