= Ukrainian Far Eastern Sich =

Ukrainian paramilitary and cultural organisation (1937–1941)

- Українська Далекосхідна Січ
- Leaders: Oleksandr Dzygar (1937); Hryhorii Kupetskyi (1937–1939)
- Founded: 23 January 1937
- Dissolved: 1941
- Country: Manchukuo
- Headquarters: Harbin
- Newspaper: Nationalist
- Ideology: Ukrainian nationalism
- Part of: Organisation of Ukrainian Nationalists

The Ukrainian Far Eastern Sich (Ukrainian: Українська Далекосхідна Січ) was a paramilitary and cultural organisation (a sich) consisting of Ukrainian diaspora living in Harbin, China, then part of the Japanese puppet state of Manchukuo. The sich sought to establish Green Ukraine, a proposed Ukrainian nation state in the Russian Far East, with the help of Imperial Japan. It was led by members of the Organisation of Ukrainian Nationalists (OUN), who were brought to Harbin through the efforts of Japanese officials.

Japan hoped to create another buffer state against the Soviet Union by cooperating with the OUN and supporting the sich, but the plan failed due to the OUN members' inability to speak Russian, and the OUN was replaced with a group of White Russian exiles. Hryhorii Kupetskyi, the second chairman of the sich, opposed Japan's cooperation with the White Russians, resulting in his imprisonment by the Japanese in 1939. The sich itself was banned a few weeks later, and formally dissolved in 1941.

== Background and prelude ==
During the interwar period of the early 20th century, some Ukrainian nationalist thinkers, such as Dmytro Dontsov and Volodymyr Kolosovsky, proposed establishing a Ukrainian nation state in the Russian Far East, where there was a sizeable Ukrainian immigrant population. The idea of a "Green Ukraine" encompassing Amur Oblast and Primorskaya Oblast was actively supported by the Organisation of Ukrainian Nationalists (OUN), as well as Imperial Japan, which sought to create an allied buffer state between its territory and the Soviet Union. Japan increased its support for Green Ukraine after invading neighbouring Manchuria in China and establishing the puppet state of Manchukuo in 1932. From Harbin, Manchukuo's largest city and the home of some 20,000 Ukrainians, Japanese dignitaries sponsored the journeys of OUN members to Manchukuo, in hopes of starting a popular movement to establish Green Ukraine through trained saboteurs.

The first OUN member to attempt the trip was Mykola Mytliuk, who had been imprisoned in his youth for militant actions against Polish rule in Pechenizhyn, then part of the Second Polish Republic's Lwów Voivodeship. Mytliuk arrived in Tokyo to speak with Japanese officials, and was tasked with starting a branch of the OUN in Manchuria that would eventually infiltrate the Far East. However, he never made it to Manchuria, dying at the hands of Soviet border guards while trying to cross the Amur river in September 1936.

Mytliuk was succeeded by eight other OUN members, who arrived in Harbin in December 1936. With the assistance of the Japanese, the group assumed false identities, adopted Russian surnames, and took prominent positions in the local branch of the Ukrainian Youth Association.

== Founding and activities ==
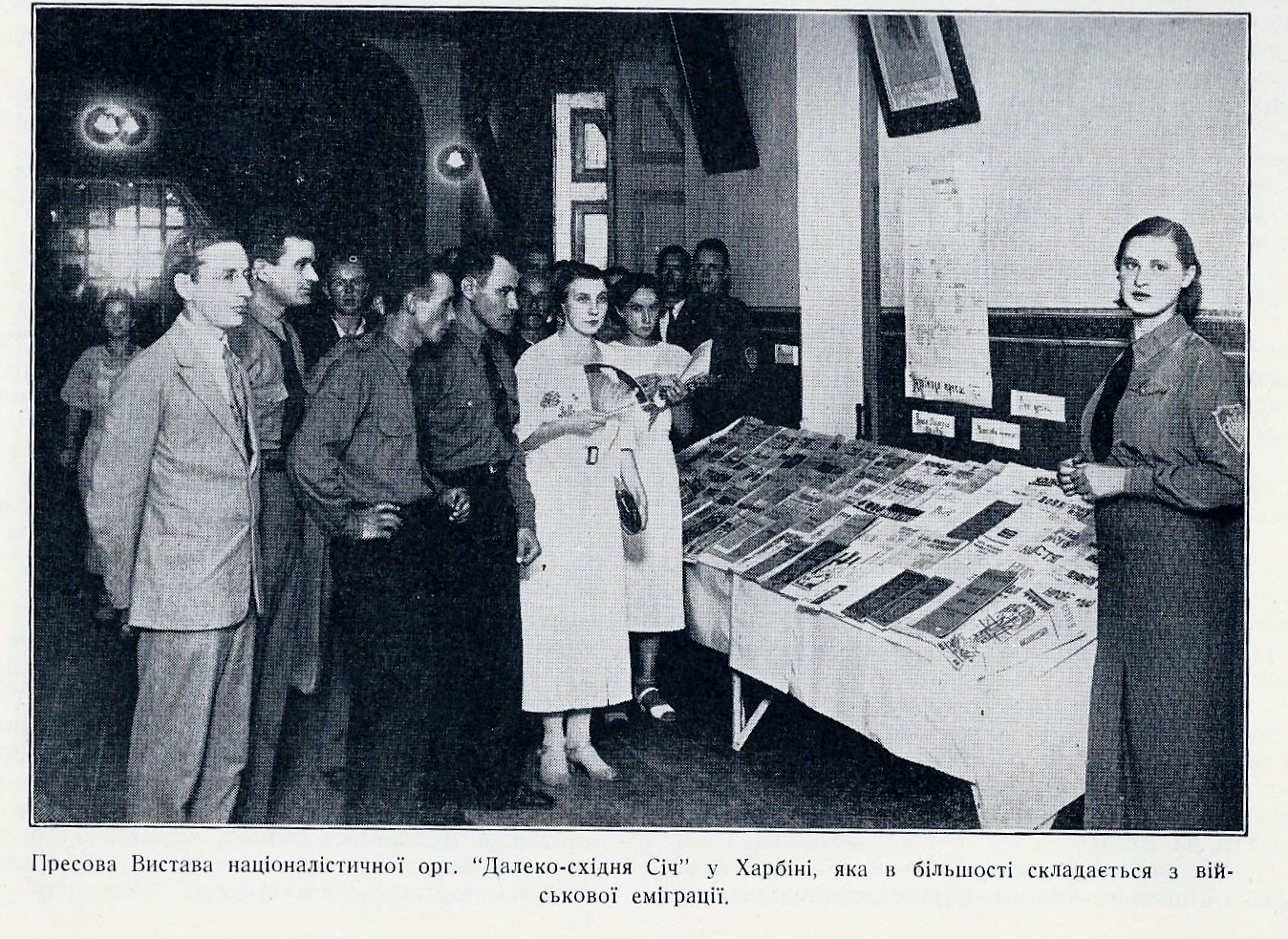
Press exhibition of the Ukrainian Far Eastern Sich in Harbin, c. 1930s

The Harbin branch of the Ukrainian Youth Association was reorganised by its OUN leadership as a paramilitary, and upon the adoption of a new statute (set of rules) on 23 January 1937, renamed itself the Ukrainian Far Eastern Sich. Its first chairman was Oleksandr Dzygar. The sich's slogan was "victory or death", while its stated purpose was to "unite all Ukrainian youth in the Far East through national education, spread the message of the Ukrainian liberation movement in the Far East both among Ukrainians and among foreigners, and organize forces around the idea of liberating Zelenyi Klyn [Green Ukraine]". Members of the sich wore uniforms with a badge containing a golden trident on a blue field.

In addition to its paramilitary activities, the sich hosted lectures, stage plays, balls, and sport events. The sich had an association football team that won the 1937 Harbin championship. That same year, the sich sent two of its members to study overseas in Fascist Italy. It also elected a new chairman, Hryhorii Kupetskyi, who intensified the group's activities.

The sich had a journal named Nationalist, but only one issue of it was published. Sich members regularly distributed brochures about Ukrainian nationhood in Russian, Japanese, and Chinese.

== Ban and dissolution ==
Japan's plan to subvert the Soviets in the Far East through the OUN was ultimately scrapped because the OUN had only sent eight of its members by the end of 1937, all of whom could not speak Russian and could therefore not be reasonably expected to infiltrate elite Soviet circles. Japanese officials had organised Russian-language lessons for the Ukrainians but abandoned their alliance with the OUN after making a deal with a more suitable group of White Russian exiles. Kupetskyi opposed Japan's decision to work with the White Russians and was consequently removed as chairman of the sich and jailed in 1939. A few weeks after Kupetskyi's arrest, the sich itself was banned, formally dissolving two years later in 1941.

== See also ==
- Ukrainians in China
- Collaboration with the Empire of Japan
