= China–Ukraine relations =

- China: Ukraine

Diplomatic mission
- Embassy of China, Kyiv: Embassy of Ukraine, Beijing

Envoy
- Ambassador Pavlo Riabikin: Ambassador Ma Shengkun

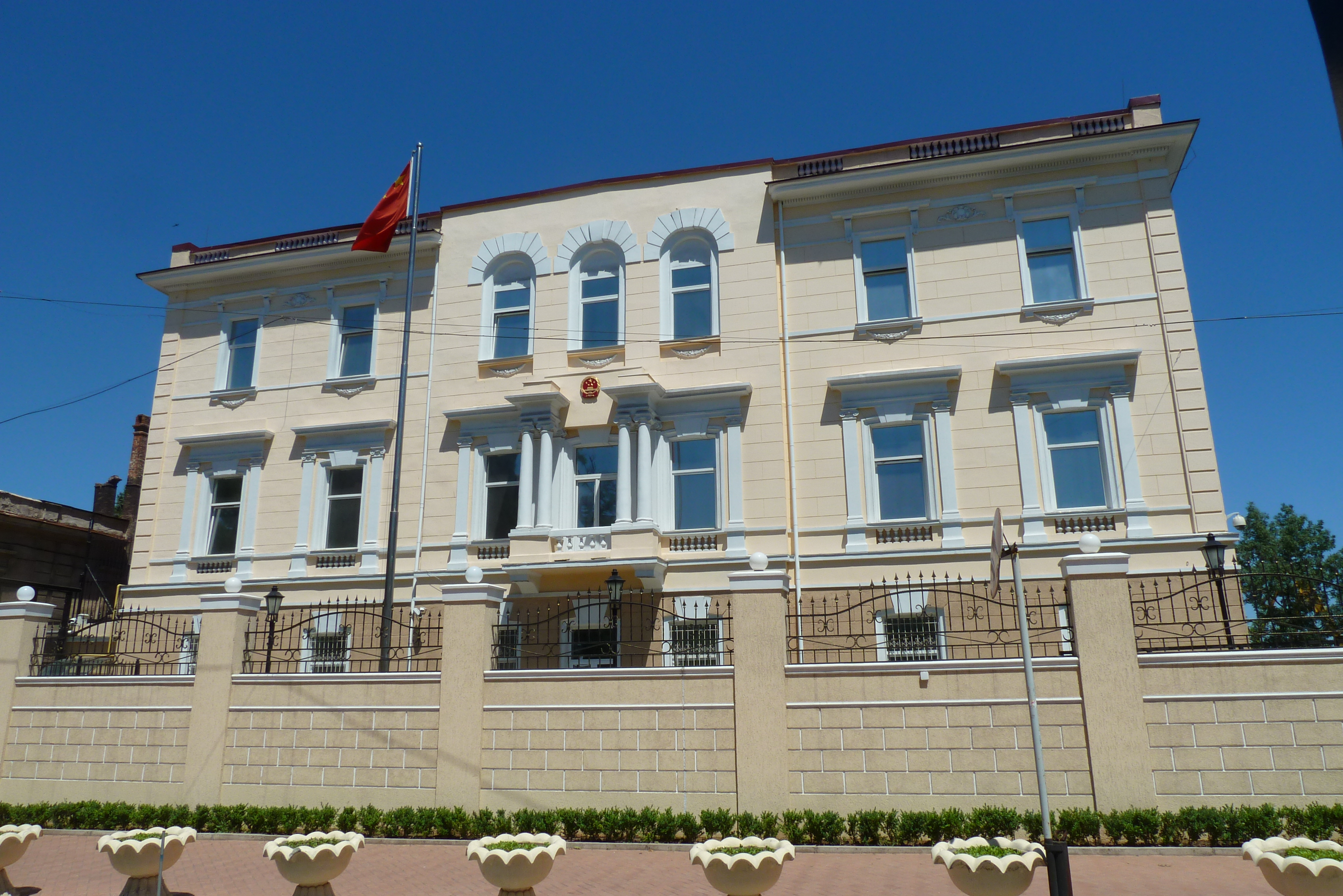
Chinese consulate-general in Odesa, Ukraine.

China–Ukraine relations are foreign relations between Ukraine and China. The earliest contact in record between the nations date back to the first Russian Orthodox mission in China in 1715, which was led by the Ukrainian Archimandrite Hilarion (Lezhaysky). As part of the Soviet Union, Ukraine recognized the People's Republic of China in October 1949. After Ukraine gained independence from the Soviet Union in 1991, the two countries built formal diplomatic relations in 1992, and declared a strategic partnership in 2011.

China has an embassy in Kyiv and a Consulate-General in Odesa. Ukraine has an embassy in Beijing and a Consulate-General in Shanghai. According to the Chinese embassy in Ukraine, over 6,000 Chinese citizens work or study in Ukraine. 50,000 to 100,000 Ukrainian citizens live in China, as estimated by the Ukrainian embassy in China, especially in the cities of Beijing, Shanghai and Harbin.

== Historical relations ==
The historical contact between the Chinese and the Ukrainian can date back to the first Russian Orthodox mission arrived in Beijing, the capital of Qing dynasty of China in 1715. The mission was led by the Ukrainian Archimandrite Hilarion Lezhaysky. The archimandrite was a graduate of the Kyiv-Mohyla Academy, and was a teacher at Chernihiv, before coming to China. Many of his successors in the mission were also from Ukraine, such as Gervasius Lentsovsky who arrived in China in 1742. The fathers also brought back knowledge to Ukraine. Thus, there were a number of original Chinese books found in Kharkiv College founded in 1722. The first-ever Chinese to visit Ukraine in record was the diplomatic mission to sign the Treaty of Livadia in 1879. Before the First World War, there were sparse Chinese migrants to Odesa. To fill the manpower shortage caused by casualties during the First World War, it is estimated that six to seven thousand Chinese workers were recruited to Ukraine during the war.

On 24 November 1966, during the UN General Assembly 21st session 2159th meeting, as the Republic of China cited the dual representation of Byelorussia, Ukraine and the Soviet Union to support similar arrangement regarding China, the Ukrainian representative argued against such arrangement and supported expelling the representative of the Republic of China (Taiwan) and transfer of the seat of the People's Republic of China. On 25 October 1972, the Ukrainian representative voted to support the People's Republic of China to take the seat of China. Following the dissolution of the Soviet Union, the People's Republic of China first established relations with Ukraine in 1992.

== Political relations ==
Since 1991, China's relations with Ukraine have been complex, unlike with Georgia, which, like Ukraine, also experienced a successful colour revolution. From 1992 to 2004, bilateral relations intensified, resulting in trade, economic, military-technical, scientific, educational, and cultural cooperation and two exchanged state visits. However, after Kyiv allowed a Taiwanese official to visit Ukraine for a meeting by International Crisis Group in 2005, relations deteriorated during the presidency of Viktor Yushchenko (2005–2010). With Viktor Yanukovych elected president in 2010, China revived the political contact with Ukraine, as two countries signed Joint Declaration on Establishment and Development of Strategic Partnership in 2011. However, after the Maidan Revolution, China has kept official contact with Ukraine low-key, considering the protests to have been "Western-sponsored". China neither denounced nor recognized the Russian annexation of Crimea.

Ukraine joined the Belt and Road Initiative in 2017.

=== Nuclear security guarantee ===
In a unilateral governmental statement in 1994, adjunct to the Budapest Memorandum agreements, China provided Ukraine with nuclear security assurances which state its inclination to peaceful settlement of differences and disputes by way of fair consultations. In December 2013, Ukrainian President Viktor Yanukovych and Chinese leader Xi Jinping signed a bilateral treaty and published a joint statement, where China reaffirmed that it will provide Ukraine with nuclear security guarantees upon nuclear invasion or threats of invasion. However, the initial coverage by Xinhua, the Chinese government's official press agency, avoided the term "nuclear umbrella", but said that China is offering Ukraine "security guarantee," though People's Daily, the official newspaper of the Central Committee of the Chinese Communist Party, used the headline "China offers Ukraine nuclear umbrella protection", which has been censored since. According to Wu Dahui, a professor at the Department of International Relations at Tsinghua University in Beijing, the promise is simply a manifestation of Beijing's global nonproliferation responsibilities.

=== Russian invasion of Ukraine ===
Ukrainian president Volodymyr Zelenskyy said that China has the economic leverage to pressure Vladimir Putin to end the war.

When asked whether she would call the war a Russian invasion of Ukraine, China's assistant foreign minister, Hua Chunying, refused to give a clear yes or no answer and instead criticised the West for deteriorating the situation, blaming the US to be "the culprit of current tensions surrounding Ukraine" and reminding the public that the NATO owes China a "debt of blood" since the United States bombing of the Chinese embassy in Belgrade in 1999. The official media also avoided referring to the conflicts as an invasion.

The Chinese ambassador expressed Chinese support for the sovereignty and territorial integrity of Ukraine to the Ukrainian media prior to the war. The Chinese government also does not recognise Russian annexation of Crimea, and has restricted contact with the occupation authorities. China abstained in the related UN Security Council votes. China also implemented the Western-led sanctions, despite criticism against sanctions.

The muddled official responses to the war has led to rare debates over Russian military actions on the social media. As the Ukrainian embassy issued a statement in Chinese condemning Russia on Weibo, the topic soon became the most heated on the platform, with the hashtag "Ukraine issues statement on Weibo" viewed over 300 million times in a day. The governments of the US, the UK, EU countries and Russia also issued statements on Weibo in response to the war. Chinese company NetEase has published anti-war videos from Chinese in Ukraine and Ukrainians in China. However, Beijing's failure to criticise Russia increased local hostility towards stranded Chinese in Ukraine, although Beijing signalled willingness to mediate in the war.

In March 2022, Chinese state media outlet China Global Television Network (CGTN) began promoting the Ukraine bioweapons conspiracy theory. The outlet also started running digital ads on Facebook with briefings and newscasts featuring pro-Kremlin talking points about the Russian invasion of Ukraine after Meta Platforms banned Russian state media advertisement buys. On 17 March 2022, the Chinese Ambassador to Ukraine, Fan Xianrong said that China will support Ukraine both economically and politically. On 19 March 2022, Ukraine asked China to join Western countries in condemning "Russian brutality," after the US warned China of dire consequences if it aids Moscow's invasion of the country with material support.

In April 2022, The Times reported that days prior to the start of the Russian invasion, a cyberwarfare unit of the People's Liberation Army launched cyberattacks against hundreds of Ukrainian government sites, according to officials of the Security Service of Ukraine (SBU). The SBU has since denied that it has provided any official information to the media about the incident, disassociated with the conclusions reached by the paper, and stated that it is not investigating and has no information of such an attack.

In May 2022, Ukrainian president Volodymyr Zelenskyy said that he was satisfied with China's current policy of staying away from the Russian-Ukrainian war, adding that "China has chosen the policy of staying away. At the moment, Ukraine is satisfied with this policy. It is better than helping the Russian Federation in any case. And I want to believe that China will not pursue another policy. We are satisfied with this status quo, to be honest." In August 2022, Zelenskyy said that since the beginning of the war in Ukraine, Xi Jinping had refused all his requests for direct talks with him.

In June 2022, CCP General Secretary Xi Jinping had a call with Russian President Putin where he reaffirmed support for Russia on security issues while saying that "all parties should responsibly push for a proper settlement of the Ukraine crisis".

China did not recognize the Russian annexation of Donetsk, Kherson, Luhansk and Zaporizhzhia oblasts in September 2022. In September 2022, Ukrainian parliamentary member Oleksandr Merezhko said China is not an ally of Ukraine, because Xi Jinping touted a "partnership without limits" with Russia and China amplifies Russian propaganda. Two members of the Ukrainian parliament joined the Inter-Parliamentary Union to share concerns about the CCP's undermining of democracy and human rights in the world. On 30 September 2022, the Ukrainian Foreign Minister Dmytro Kuleba stated that China's current stance on the Russian-Ukrainian war is more beneficial to Ukraine than to Russia.

In April 2023, China's ambassador to France Lu Shaye stated that former Soviet countries "don't have the status...how to say...effective in international law because there is no international agreement to concretize their status as a sovereign country." When asked whether he thought Crimea belonged to Ukraine, the ambassador said, "it depends on how you perceive the problem," adding that "it's not that simple" and that Crimea was "Russian at the beginning," without specifying what he meant by beginning. Ukraine's ambassador to France Vadym Omelchenko responded to the comments by saying that either there are problems with understanding of geography, or statements by the Chinese ambassador run counter to the principles of the UN Charter. Ambassador Omelchenko also suggested posing the question about "who owns Vladivostok?" to the Chinese ambassador. The Chinese government subsequently distanced itself from Lu Shaye's remarks, describing them as "personal comments" and stating that China "respects the status of the member states as sovereign states after the collapse of the Soviet Union".

On 26 April 2023, Xi called Zelenskyy over a month after Xi's summit with Russia's president Vladimir Putin.

In September 2023, Chinese opera singer Wang Fang sparked a diplomatic row after singing the Soviet song "Katyusha" inside the Mariupol Drama Theater in Ukraine where hundreds were killed by airstrikes in 2022. Wang was among a Chinese delegation visiting Russian-occupied eastern Ukraine. Oleg Nikolenko, spokesman for the Ministry of Foreign Affairs of Ukraine, said "the Chinese delegation’s visit to occupied Ukraine was illegal" and that "the performance of the song “Katyusha” by Chinese ‘opera singer’ Wang Fang on the ruins of the Mariupol Drama Theater, where the Russian army killed more than 600 innocent people, is an example of complete moral degradation". In response, the Ministry of Foreign Affairs of Ukraine said it plans to ban future visits by Chinese bloggers.

On 8 October 2023, Ukrainian Prime Minister Denys Shmyhal said the country's forces were leaning heavily on drones from Chinese company DJI for Ukraine's defense, adding that Ukraine was effectively buying 60% of DJI's global output of Mavic quadcopter drones. A DJI spokesperson told Defense News that his statement "bears no resemblance to reality and is totally misleading with regards to DJI’s involvement in the use of its production in Ukraine."

On 23 July 2024, the Ukrainian Foreign Minister Dmytro Kuleba visited China for talks with Chinese Foreign Minister Wang Yi on ways to achieve a peaceful end to the war with Russia. This was the first such bilateral visit since 2012. China had published peace proposals in February 2023 and May 2024.

In April 2025, Zelenskyy summoned the Chinese ambassador in Kyiv after Chinese nationals were captured fighting in eastern Ukraine. Zelenskyy stated that over 150 Chinese nationals were fighting on Russia's side in Ukraine. Zelenskyy subsequently stated that China was supplying Russia with gunpowder and artillery. Also in April 2025, Ukraine imposed sanctions on three Chinese companies that it alleges are involved in the production of 9K720 Iskander missiles. On June 27, 2025, Ukraine announced another Chinese citizen was captured while fighting for Russia. In July 2025, Ukraine sanctioned five Chinese companies accused of supplying drone components to Russian Shahed-type drones. The same month, the Security Service of Ukraine announced it had detained two Chinese nationals suspected of spying on Ukraine's Neptune missile program. In July 2025, Chinese foreign minister Wang Yi told the European Union's top diplomat that China cannot accept Russia losing its war against Ukraine.

In June 2025, a majority of US senators supported secondary sanctions against Russia that would impose 500% tariffs on countries that buy Russian oil, natural gas, uranium and other exports. China is one of the main consumers of Russian energy.

In June 2025, The New York Times reported that a leaked internal Russian FSB memo raised concerns about China with respect to industrial espionage of sensitive Russian technologies. Information on Russia's weaponry has increasingly been targeted by advanced persistent threats emanating from China.

In August 2025, Zelenskyy alleged that Chinese nationals were among foreign mercenaries fighting alongside Russian forces in northeastern Ukraine. During a visit to the frontline in the Kharkiv region, Zelenskyy said that Ukrainian troops in the area had reported the presence of mercenaries from China, Tajikistan, Uzbekistan, Pakistan, and several African countries, and warned that Ukraine would respond. He had previously accused Moscow of recruiting Chinese fighters for its war effort.

== Trade relations ==
The two countries have built strong trade ties, especially since 2008. China became Ukraine's largest trading partner in 2019, with a trade turnover of US$15.4 billion in 2020, of which Ukraine exports goods were worth US$7.1 billion. The total trade turnover increased from 2% of Ukraine's GDP in 2001 to 11% in 2020. The two countries have cooperated closely in the military-technical domain and in the space industry, with some famous bilateral projects, such as the Chinese purchase of the Ukrainian aircraft carrier Varyag in 1998, which later became China's first aircraft carrier, Liaoning, in 2012. By 2018 Ukraine had replaced the United States as the largest exporter of corn to China, and has begun supplying China with modern jet engines for military craft.

During the 2009 flu pandemic in Ukraine, the Chinese government allocated free aid worth a total of 3.5 million yuan ($500,000) to supply diagnostic devices, face masks, eyeglasses, gloves, and other means of protection for Ukraine. From 2016 to 2021, China's investment in Ukraine rose from $50 million to $260 million. Despite a small share of total foreign direct investment (FDI), 0.5%, the growth rate of Chinese investment is significantly ahead of FDI growth in general. Primarily Chinese state-owned companies invest in Ukrainian state-owned companies; loans are usually also provided by state-owned banks. Chinese companies mostly work with their Ukrainian counterparts in the energy sector and agriculture.

In April 2023 Ukraine's National Agency on Corruption Prevention designated China's Xiaomi Corporation an "international sponsor of war". In June 2023 the agency added Zhejiang Geely Holding Group Co., Ltd. (a major Chinese automotive company commonly known as Geely) to its list of international sponsors of war. The list also includes Chinese companies such as Great Wall Motor, China State Construction Engineering Corporation, Hikvision, Dahua Technology, as well as the Alibaba Group.

== Public opinion ==
In a 2019 poll by the Pew Research Center, 57% of Ukrainians held a favourable view towards China while 14% held an unfavourable view. An opinion poll conducted by the Razumkov Centre in February–March 2023 showed that 60% of Ukrainians surveyed had a negative view of China. Another Razumkov Centre poll conducted in January 2024 had 72.5% of Ukrainian respondents expressing a negative view of China, which was only less than 3 other countries: Iran (82%), Belarus (87%), and Russia (95%). 64% expressed a negative view of Xi Jinping in the 2024 poll.

According to a March 2022 Internet survey conducted by the Central European Institute of Asian Studies, Ukraine was negatively perceived by 46% of Chinese respondents. Few polls had asked Chinese respondents their views of Ukraine, but prior to Russia's invasion, Ukrainian opinion appeared to have been far more positive towards China than the reverse.

In a Carter Center online survey conducted between March and April 2022, 75% of Chinese respondents agreed that supporting Russia in the "Russo-Ukrainian conflict" serves China's national interest; 61% said the best course of action for China is moral support for Russia. An Internet survey conducted by the University of California, San Diego during the same period had 40% of Chinese respondents supporting Russia, 25% expressing opposition, and 35% remaining neutral, with 69% of respondents preferring that China stays neutral or silent in terms of its actual position. According to a November 2022 Genron NPO poll on Chinese peoples' views of the invasion, 39.5% of respondents said "the Russian actions are not wrong" compared to 50.6% of respondents recognising the Russian actions as wrong, but 29% of the latter group added that "the circumstances should be considered."

According to the end of year survey by Gallup International, 80% of Ukrainians have a negative view of China's leader Xi Jinping. The study notes that 40% of Ukrainians have a very negative view, and 40% have a rather negative view. Only 10% had a positive view, while the other 10% were undecided.

== Twinnings ==
- (China) Beijing and (Ukraine) Kyiv
- (China) Chongqing and (Ukraine) Zaporizhia
- (China) Jinan and (Ukraine) Kharkiv
- (China) Qingdao and (Ukraine) Odesa
- (China) Suzhou and (Ukraine) Kyiv
- (China) Taiyuan and (Ukraine) Donetsk
- (China) Tianjin and (Ukraine) Kharkiv
- (China) Wuhan and (Ukraine) Kyiv
- (China) Xi'an and (Ukraine) Dnipro
- (China) Xuzhou and (Ukraine) Kropyvnytskyi
- (China) Handan and (Ukraine) Kryvyi Rih
- (China) Suzhou and (Ukraine) Zaporizhia

== See also ==
- Foreign relations of China
- Foreign relations of Ukraine
- Embassy of China, Kyiv
- China–Russia relations
- Ukrainians in Hong Kong
