= Zhou Li (diplomat) =

Chinese diplomat

Chinese Ambassador to Ukraine
- In office February 2007 – April 2010
- Preceded by: Gao Yusheng
- Succeeded by: Zhang Xiyun

Personal details
- Born: June 1955 (age 71) Anqiu, Shandong, China
- Education: University of International Relations
- Occupation: Diplomat, politician

Zhou Li (Chinese: 周力; born June 1955) is a Chinese diplomat, member of National Committee of the Chinese People's Political Consultative Conference, served between 2013 and 2016 as the deputy head of the International Liaison Department of the Chinese Communist Party.

== Biography ==
Born in Anqiu, Shandong province, Zhou has a master's degree in economics. He has been a lifelong diplomat, having served in the embassy to the Soviet Union (and later Russia), before returning to China in 1999 to serve as the deputy head of the department of European and Asian Affairs at the Ministry of Foreign Affairs. He returned to Russia in 2002. He was promoted to European and Asian Affairs department chief in 2004, in 2006 he was posted to the Embassy of China, Kiev as ambassador in Ukraine. He was transferred to Kazakhstan as ambassador in 2010.

He is married and has one son.

Diplomatic posts
Preceded by Gao Yusheng	Ambassador of China to Ukraine; 2007–2010	Succeeded by Zhang Xiyun
Preceded by Cheng Guoping	Ambassador of China to Kazakhstan; 2010–2013	Succeeded by Le Yucheng
