= List of ambassadors of China to Israel =

Coordinates: 32.094404°N 34.775160°E

Ambassador of China to Israel
- Incumbent; Cai Run since January 2021
- Inaugural holder: Tang Zhenqi
- Formation: September 1989; 37 years ago

The ambassador of China to Israel is the official representative of the People's Republic of China to the State of Israel.

== List of representatives ==
Diplomatic agrément/Diplomatic accreditation	Ambassador	Chinese language zh:中国驻以色列大使列表	Observations	Premier of the People's Republic of China	President of Israel	Term end
January 9, 1950			Israel announced its recognition of the People's Republic of China.	Zhou Enlai	Chaim Weizmann	
September 1989			China established the China International Travel Service office in Tel Aviv.	Li Peng	Chaim Herzog	
1992			Establishment of diplomatic relations	Li Peng	Chaim Herzog	
September 1989	Tang Zhenqi	zh:唐振琪	(February 1944): In 1966, he graduated from the Department of Shanghai Normal University Foreign Languages.; In 1972, transferred to the Ministry of Foreign Affairs, the embassy in the translation of Pakistan, industry officials Foreign Ministry Foreign Affairs Division North Africa.; In 1989, he served as director of the tourism office in Israel.; In 1993, the Ministry of Foreign Affairs as WANA Counselor.; In 1998 he was ambassador to Namibia. In 2000 was Ministry of Foreign Affairs head of staff.; From 2002 to 2004 he was ambassador to Athens Greece. In 2005 he retired.	Li Peng	Chaim Herzog	January 1992
January 1992	Lin Zhen	zh:林真 (外交官)	From 1989 to 1992 he was ambassador in Yemen, RDP	Li Peng	Chaim Herzog	February 1992
November 1995	Wang Changyi	zh:王昌义	1983–1986: Djibouti; 1986–1989: Syria	Li Peng	Ezer Weizman	August 1995
November 2000	Pan Zhanlin	zh:潘占林	From July 1992 to January 1995 he was Ambassador to Kyrgyzstan.; From December 1994 to April 1998 was Ambassador to Ukraine.; From December 1997 to October 2000 he was Ambassador in Belgrade Yugoslavia.	Zhu Rongji	Moshe Katsav	April 2000
November 2003	Chen Yonglong	zh:陈永龙	From April 2001 to October 2003 he was ambassador to Jordan.	Wen Jiabao	Moshe Katsav	June 2003
April 2007	Zhao Jun	zh:赵军 (外交官)		Wen Jiabao	Shimon Peres	May 2007
September 2011	Gao Yanping	zh:高燕平		Wen Jiabao	Shimon Peres	September 2011
February 2015	Zhan Yongxin	詹永新		Li Keqiang	Reuven Rivlin	February 2020
February 2020	Du Wei	杜伟	From 2016 to 2019 he was ambassador to Ukraine; Died in office	Li Keqiang	Reuven Rivlin	May 17, 2020
January 2021	Cai Run	蔡润		Li Keqiang	Reuven Rivlin	
November 2024	Xiao Junzheng			Li Keqiang	Reuven Rivlin	

== See also ==
China–Israel relations
