= Consulate General of Ukraine in Guangzhou =

Consulate General of Ukraine in Guangzhou Генеральне Консульство України в Гуанчжоу
- Location: Guangzhou, Guangdong, China
- Address: 1407 CITIC Plaza, 233 N. Tianhe St, Tianhe District
- Opened: May 30, 2012
- Consul General: Serhiy Kapuzo
- Website: guangzhou.mfa.gov.ua/zh

The Consulate General of Ukraine in Guangzhou (Chinese: 乌克兰驻广州总领事馆; Ukrainian: Генеральне консульство України в Гуанчжоу, romanized: Heneralne konsulstvo Ukrainy v Huanchzhou） is a consulate established by the Ukraine Foreign Ministry in the city of Guangzhou in China. It is Ukraine's second consulate in China, after Shanghai.

== History ==
In June 2011, Chinese Premier Hu Jintao went on a state visit to Ukraine. During the visit, the Ukrainian foreign minister Kostyantyn Gryshchenko met with Chinese foreign minister Yang Jiechi in Kyiv. Both signed an agreement establishing a new Ukrainian consulate in the Chinese city of Guangzhou. The consulate officially opened about a year later, on May 30, 2012.

This was Ukraine's second consulate in China, after establishing the first one in Shanghai.

== Jurisdiction ==
The jurisdiction of this consulate covers: Guangdong, Guangxi, Hainan, Hunan, and Guizhou provinces.

== List of Consuls ==
- Viktor Berezovskiy: 2012 – 2015
- Maksym Nemirya: 2015 – 2019
- Dmitro Kamkov: 2019 – 2022
- Serhiy Kapuzo: 2022 – present

== See also ==
- China-Ukraine relations
- Foreign relations of China
- Foreign relations of Ukraine
