= Li Guobang =

Chinese diplomat

Chinese Ambassador to Cyprus
- In office November 2009 – May 2012
- Preceded by: Zhao Yali
- Succeeded by: Liu Xinsheng

Chinese Ambassador to Serbia
- In office April 1, 2003 – 2008
- Preceded by: Wen Xigui
- Succeeded by: Wei Jinghua

Chinese Ambassador to Ukraine
- In office November 2000 – September 2003
- Preceded by: Zhou Xiaopei
- Succeeded by: Yao Peisheng

Chinese Ambassador to Croatia
- In office August 1997 – 2000

Personal details
- Born: October 1, 1951 (age 75) Inner Mongolia
- Education: University of International Relations
- Occupation: Diplomat, politician

Li Guobang (Chinese: 李国邦) (born 1951) is a Chinese diplomat. He was born in Inner Mongolia. He was Ambassador of the People's Republic of China to Croatia (1997–2000), Ukraine (2000–2003), Serbia and Montenegro (2003–2006), Serbia (2006–2008) and Cyprus (2009–2012).
