= Ludong University =

Public university in Yantai, Shandong, China

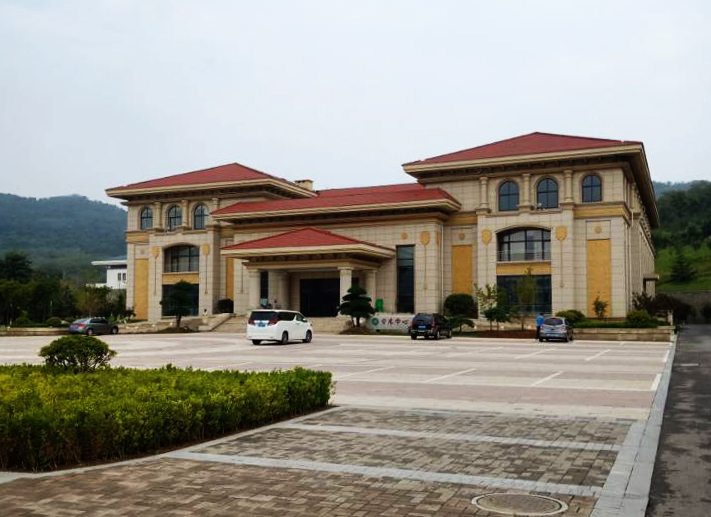
Ludong University

Ludong University (Chinese: 鲁东大学) is a provincial public university in Yantai, Shandong, China. Founded in 1958, the institution was first known as Yantai Teachers Speciality School (烟台师范专科学校) and since 1984 as Yantai Normal University (烟台师范学院; 'Yantai Normal College'). The institution was granted university status in 2006. Ludong University offers 48 majors in arts and sciences.
