= Nikolai Ivanovich Lunev =

Chinese politician

- Born: May 1966 (age 60); Yining, Xinjiang, China
- Political party: Chinese Communist Party

Nikolai Ivanovich Lunev (Note: Chinese: 卢尼奥夫·尼古拉·伊万诺维奇; pinyin: Lúníàofú Nígǔlā Yīwànnuòwéiqí; Russian: Николай Иванович Лунёв.) (born May 1966) is a Chinese politician. He was a deputy of the 11th Chinese People's Political Consultative Conference.

== Biography ==
Lunev's grandfather and his family fled to China from the Soviet Union in 1932 to escape the famine of the 1930s (according to other sources, to escape collectivization) and settled in Yining (Ghulja). Later, the large Russian Ghulja diaspora began to disintegrate; in the early 1960s, many decided to leave for Australia, but Lunev's parents and several other families decided to stay.

Lunev and his wife Lydia studied together at a Russian school in Ghulja. Several years later, he became the director of this school. Nikolai and Lydia have three children.

== Political career ==
Lunev became a deputy of the Chinese People's Political Consultative Conference. According to the existing election procedure, at parliamentary meetings he represents the entire Russian community of the PRC. He is the initiator of a number of measures to improve the living conditions of the Russian diaspora, and also supports of the idea of developing a special economic zone in the Ili Kazakh Autonomous Prefecture of Xinjiang. He is a permanent participant in conferences of compatriots in China, organized by the Consulate General of the Russia in Shanghai and the Coordination Council of Compatriots chaired by Mikhail Drozdov, as well as conferences of compatriots from the countries of the Asia-Pacific region at the Russian Embassy in China.
