= Weifang University =

University in Weifang, China

- 潍坊学院 (Chinese)
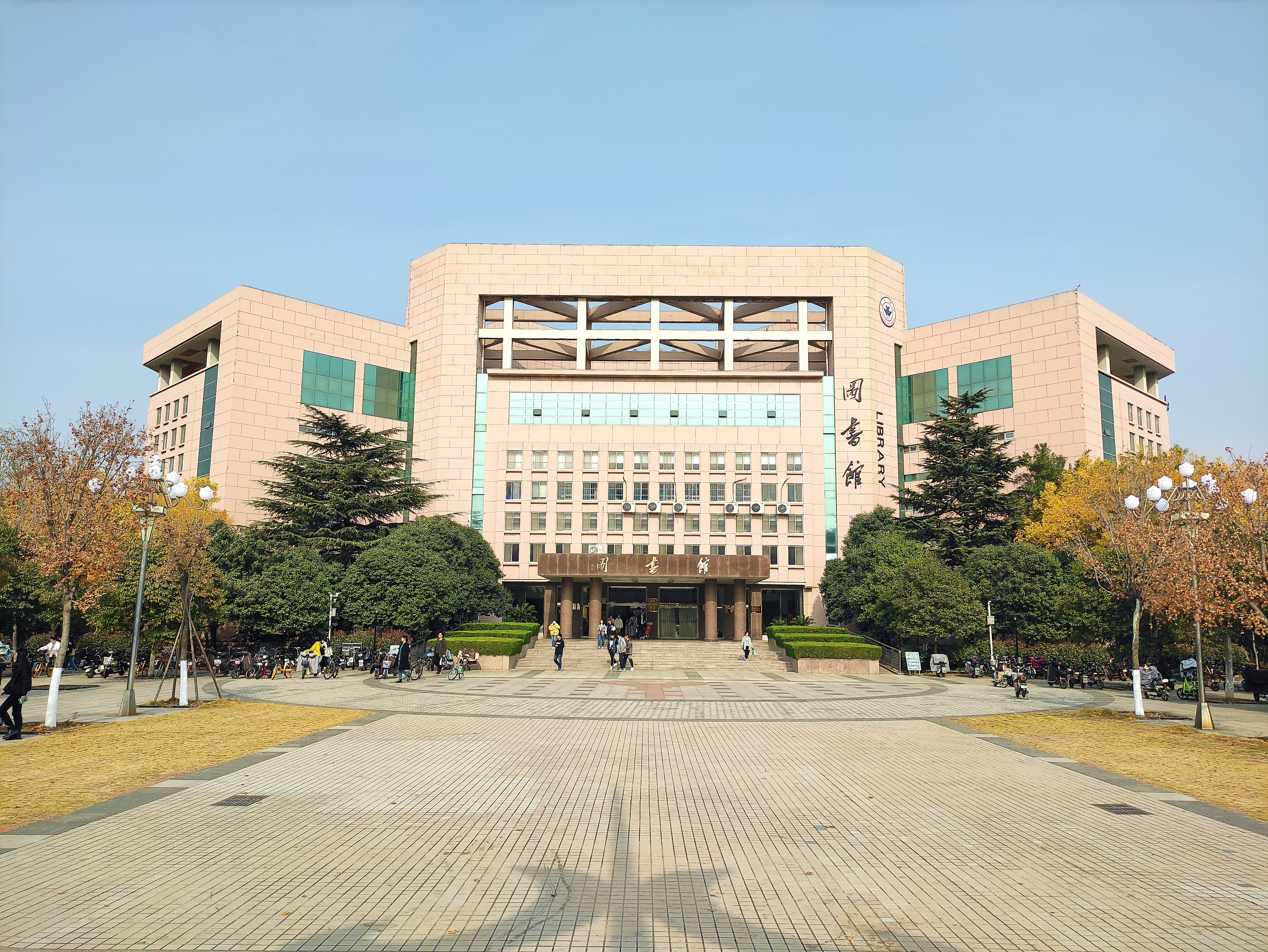
- Library of Weifang University
- Type: Public college
- Established: 1951
- President: Wang Shoulun
- Faculty: 1,158
- Administrative staff: 1,758
- Students: 20,000
- Undergraduates: 20,000
- Location: Weifang, Shandong, China
- Campus: Urban area 75,000 square meters
- Website: wfu.edu.cn

Weifang University (WFU; simplified Chinese: 潍坊学院; traditional Chinese: 濰坊學院; pinyin: Wéi Fāng Xué Yuàn; lit. 'Weifang College') is a provincial public undergraduate and tertiary vocational college in Weifang, Shandong, China. Despite its self-designated English name, the institute has not been granted university status by the authorities but college status instead.

In March 2000, with the approval of the Ministry of Education of China, the Weifang Higher Vocational Training School, Changwei Teachers Vocational Training School, Weifang Radio and Television University, and Shandong Bohai Continuing Education College merged to form Weifang College.

== Academics ==
=== Departmental speciality ===
As of April 2024, the university has 26 teaching units and offers 74 undergraduate majors in 10 major disciplines: science, engineering, literature, economics, management, agriculture, law, history, education and art.
