= Zhang Zhen (diplomat, born 1936) =

Chinese diplomat

Zhang Zhen (Chinese: 张真; born 1936) was a Chinese diplomat. He was Ambassador of the People's Republic of China to Jordan (1985–1989) and Syria (1989–1993).

Preceded by	Ambassador of China to Jordan; 1985–1989	Succeeded by
Preceded by Wang Changyi	Ambassador of China to Syria; 1989–1993	Succeeded by Li Qingyu
