= Zhao Jun (diplomat) =

Chinese diplomat (born 1954)

- 赵军
- Incumbent
- Assumed office May 2012
- Preceded by: Tang Guoqiang

Chinese Ambassador to Israel
- In office May 2007 – June 2011
- Preceded by: Chen Yonglong
- Succeeded by: Gao Yanping

Personal details
- Born: November 1954 (age 71)
- Party: office =Chinese Ambassador to Norway
- Occupation: Diplomat

Zhao Jun (born November 1954) is a former Chinese ambassador to Norway.

== Biography ==
Zhao, a university graduate, started off as a staff member at the Embassy of the People's Republic of China in Malta. In 1981 he became a staff member, Attache and Third Secretary, Department of West European Affairs, and Ministry of Foreign Affairs of the People's Republic of China. In 1992, he served as the deputy director of the Department of West European Affairs. Between 1996 and 2001 he was a counselor at the Chinese Embassy in the United Kingdom and in Northern Ireland. In 2007 he replaced Chen Yonglong as Chinese Ambassador to Israel and was relieved from that position in 2011, succeeded by Gao Yanping.

As of 2013, he was ambassador to Norway. Zhao is married and has one son.
