= Wang Changyi =

Chinese diplomat

Chinese Ambassador to Israel
- In office August 1995 – November 2000
- Preceded by: Lin Zhen
- Succeeded by: Pan Zhanlin

Ambassador of China to Syria
- In office June 1986 – March 1989
- Preceded by: Lin Zhaonan
- Succeeded by: Zhang Zhen

Ambassador of China to Djibouti
- In office June 1983 – November 1985
- Preceded by: Cao Keqiang

Personal details
- Born: August 1936 (age 89) Jiangsu, China
- Occupation: Diplomat, politician

Wang Changyi (Chinese: 王昌义) is a Chinese diplomat. He was Ambassador of the People's Republic of China to Djibouti (1983–1985), Syria (1986–1989). He was a member of the 9th (1998–2003) and 10th (2003–2008) Chinese People's Political Consultative Conference.
