= Fan Xianrong =

Chinese diplomat

- 范先荣
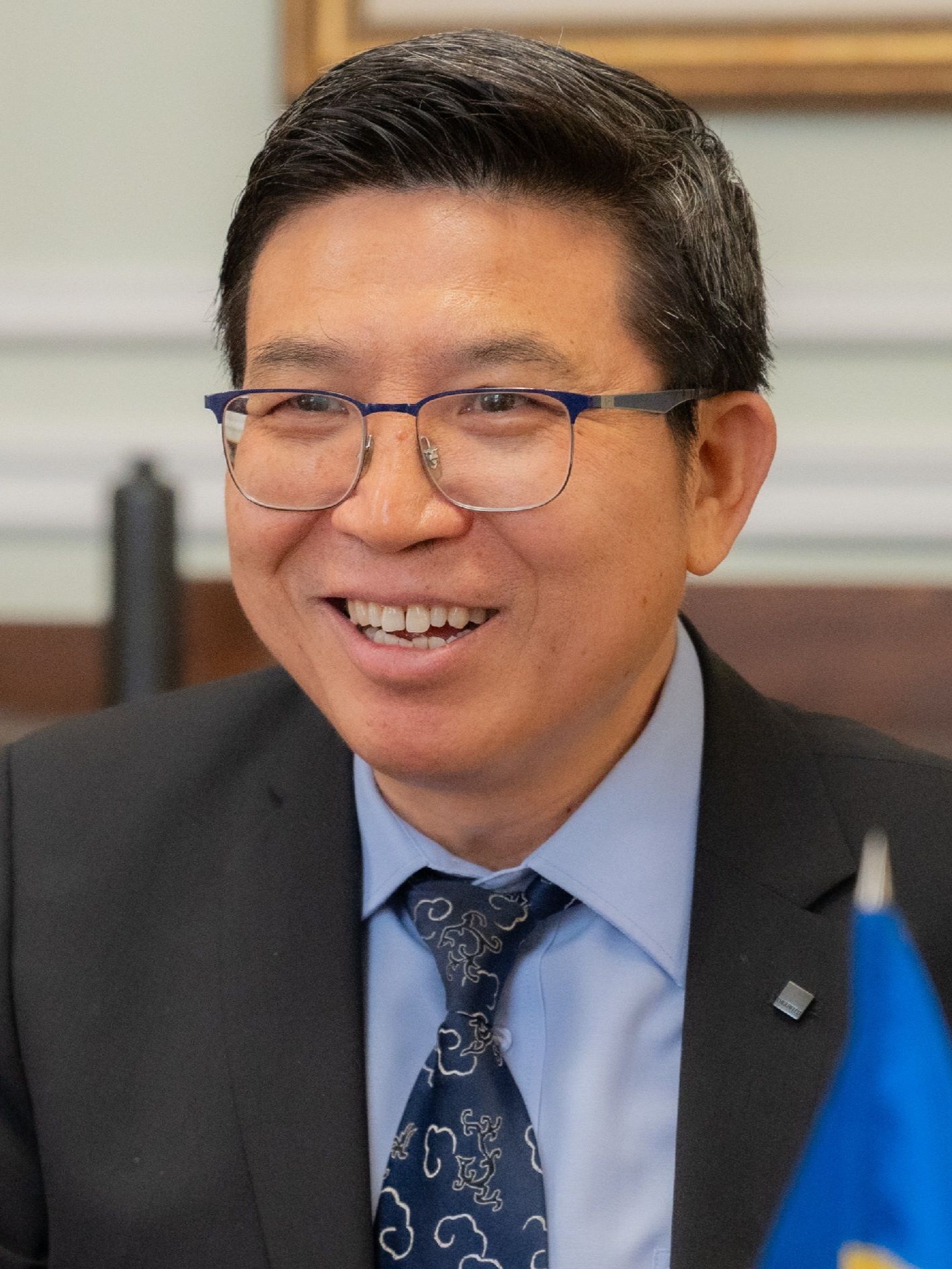

Chinese Ambassador to Ukraine
- In office March 2020 – November 2024
- Preceded by: Du Wei
- Succeeded by: Ma Shengkun

Chinese Ambassador to Tajikistan
- In office July 2010 – December 2015
- Preceded by: Zuo Xueliang
- Succeeded by: Yue Bin

Personal details
- Born: March 1963 (age 63) Chongqing, China
- Party: Chinese Communist Party
- Education: Beijing Foreign Studies University

Chinese name
- Simplified Chinese: 范先荣
- Traditional Chinese: 范先榮
Transcriptions
Standard Mandarin
- Hanyu Pinyin: Fàn Xiānróng

Fan Xianrong (Chinese: 范先荣; pinyin: Fàn Xiānróng; born March 1963) is a Chinese diplomat who served as the Chinese Ambassador to Ukraine from March 2020 to November 2024. He served as Chinese Ambassador to Tajikistan from 2010 to 2015.

== Biography ==
Fan was born in Chongqing, in March 1963 and graduated from Beijing Foreign Studies University. In 1992, he went to Kyiv, Ukraine to participate in the preparation for the establishment of the Chinese Embassy in Ukraine. He served as counsellor of the Embassy in the Russian Federation in 2001 and consul general in Khabarovsk in 2004. In 2008, he was appointed as counsellor of the General Office of the Ministry of Foreign Affairs of the People's Republic of China. The Chinese government appointed him Chinese Ambassador to Tajikistan in July 2010, and held that office until December 2015.

In 2015, he returned to China and that same year became director of the Foreign Affairs Office of Ningxia Hui Autonomous Region.

In 2017, he was sent to Russia again and was appointed envoy of the Chinese Embassy in the Russian Federation. In February 2020, he was appointed Chinese Ambassador to Ukraine, replacing Du Wei. On November 26, 2024, Chinese president Xi Jinping appointed Ma Shengkun as new Chinese ambassador to Ukraine, and Fan Xianrong left his post, in accordance with the decision of the Standing Committee of the National People's Congress.

Diplomatic posts
Preceded by Zuo Xueliang	Chinese Ambassador to Tajikistan; 2010–2015	Succeeded by Yue Bin
Preceded by Du Wei	Chinese Ambassador to Ukraine; 2020–2024	Succeeded by Ma Shengkun
