= Ukrainians in Hong Kong =

Ukrainian diaspora

Ukrainians in Hong Kong (Note: Ukrainian: Українці Гонконгу, romanized: Ukraintsi Honkonhu Chinese: 在港烏克蘭人 or 在香港的烏克蘭人) are people of Ukrainian nationality or with Ukrainian citizenship who live in Hong Kong. To unite the community and preserve its cultural heritage, an organization was created that interacts with the Ukraine consular corps. No Ukrainian embassy or consulate operate in Hong Kong. The closest is in Guangzhou.

== History ==
After the destruction of the Ukrainian community in Manchuria by the Red Army, some settled in Hong Kong as a temporary refuge before departing to Latin America or Australia.

Interest in Hong Kong appeared after Ukraine regained independence, as well as following the handover of Hong Kong in 1997 to the People's Republic of China. In the late 1990s, travelers and the first Ukrainian businessmen arrived. However, the emergence of the community as such began in the early 2000s.

Some 100 to 200 Ukrainians were living in Hong Kong as of the 2020s, many temporarily.

Most Ukrainians in Hong Kong are from Crimea, Kyiv, Dnipro, Kharkiv, and Vinnytsia, from East to West all over the country, and are part of the diasporas of Australia and Canada.

Ukrainians there work as IT specialists, artists, singers, models, lawyers, accountants, pilots and other airline employees, scientists, doctors, beauty salon workers, diving trainers, and private entrepreneurs. Two Ukrainian restaurants serve Hong Kong. Ivan The Kozak in Central which opened in 2001, is the better known. The restaurant gained more popularity since the Russian invasion of Ukraine in 2022. In 2024, local television ViuTV interviewed the owner, describing the fusion of Ukrainian and Hong Kong cuisine and her story.

== Organisations ==
For a considerable period, cultural groups were not united. The events of Euromaidan, the Revolution of Dignity, and the onslaught of the Russo-Ukrainian War beginning with the Russian annexation of Crimea and the war in Donbas raised self-awareness and led to a formal organization. In 2014, the Ukrainian Society of Hong Kong was created and officially registered. It numbers about 100 people. The most proactive members are Kateryna Kardash and Oksana Smoliichuk.

The society organises joint celebrations of state and religious Ukrainian holidays. In addition, cultural events, literary readings, and screenings of Ukrainian films are regularly offered. The monthly Ukrainian Film Nights project launched to popularise Ukrainian culture, identities, and history.

Hong Kong Ukrainians joined worldwide demonstrations against the Russian full-scale invasion of Ukraine. Ukrainians work with organizations in Ukraine to help ATO soldiers, by supplying necessary items.

The Ukrainian Society of Hong Kong community on Facebook informs about donations, and was joined by Ukrainians from Macau, Guangzhou, and Shenzhen.

== See also ==
- Ukrainians in China
- Ukrainians in Manchuria
