= Du Wei (diplomat) =

Chinese diplomat (1962–2020)

Chinese Ambassador to Israel
- In office 15 February 2020 – 17 May 2020
- Preceded by: Zhan Yongxin
- Succeeded by: Cai Run

Chinese Ambassador to Ukraine
- In office June 2016 – December 2019
- Preceded by: Zhang Xiyun
- Succeeded by: Fan Xianrong

Personal details
- Born: 2 October 1962 Zhucheng, Shandong, China
- Died: 17 May 2020 (aged 57)^{A} Herzliya, Israel
- Education: University of International Relations
- Occupation: Diplomat, politician

Du Wei
- Traditional Chinese: 杜偉
- Simplified Chinese: 杜伟
Transcriptions
Standard Mandarin
- Hanyu Pinyin: Dù Wěi

Du Wei (Chinese: 杜伟; 2 October 1962 – 17 May 2020^{A}) was a Chinese diplomat who served as Ambassador to Ukraine from 2016 until 2019 and Ambassador to Israel from February 2020 until May 2020. Du was born in China's Shandong province and worked as a career diplomat.

== Career ==
Before his first overseas appointment, Du worked as the deputy director general of the Policy Planning Department of China's Ministry of Foreign Affairs.

Du served as the Chinese ambassador to Ukraine from 2016 to 2020. During his tenure in Ukraine, he met with Ukrainian Foreign Affairs Minister Vadym Prystaiko in an effort to expand the relationship between the two countries. He was responsible for a technical assistance program in which the Chinese government gave special equipment to the State Emergency Services in Ukraine. He was also involved in negotiations following a blocked take-over of Ukrainian defense company Motor Sich by a Chinese company.

He assumed his Israeli post in February 2020, with an initial two-week quarantine due to the coronavirus pandemic. He submitted his credentials to Israeli President Reuven Rivlin virtually due to the pandemic.

== Personal life ==
Du was married and had a son.

== Death ==
Du was found dead in his Herzliya apartment on 17 May 2020.^{A} His death came in the middle of the COVID-19 pandemic, and a few days after US Secretary of State Mike Pompeo's visit to Israel, during which he assailed China and tried to pressure Israel to curb Chinese investments. These circumstances have led to various conspiracy theories about the cause of his death.

The day after, China announced that it would send an investigative team to conduct an internal investigation into the ambassador's death, but later walked back the decision.

As there were no signs of violence at the scene and no residues of poison, alcohol or drugs in Du's blood, Israeli medical sources believe he died of cardiac arrest in his sleep. The Chinese Foreign Ministry declared that he had died of "health reasons".

== Notes ==
^A His body was found on the morning of 17 May but his exact date of death has not been reported.

Diplomatic posts
Preceded by Zhan Yongxin	Ambassador of China to Israel; February - May 2020	Succeeded by Cai Run
Preceded by Zhang Xiyun	Ambassador of China to Ukraine; 2016–2019	Succeeded by Fan Xianrong
