= Zhang Zhen (diplomat, born 1930) =

Chinese diplomat

Zhang Zhen (Chinese: 張震; born 1930) is a former Chinese diplomat. He was born in Shanghai. He was Ambassador of the People's Republic of China to Ukraine (1992–1995). Zhang was awarded the Ukrainian Order of Merit (3rd class) on 31 October 2011.

== Bibliography ==
- Українська дипломатична енциклопедія: У 2-х т./Редкол.:Л. В. Губерський (голова) та ін. — К.:Знання України, 2004 — Т.2 — 812с. ISBN 966-316-045-4

Preceded by New office	Ambassador at the Embassy of China, Kiev; 1992–1995	Succeeded by Pan Zhanlin
