= List of ambassadors of China to Angola =

The ambassador of China to Angola is the official representative of the People's Republic of China to the Republic of Angola.

== List of representatives ==
Name	Appointed	Terminated
Zhao Zhenkui	September 1984	May 1988
Hu Lipeng	May 1988	April 1992
Zhang Baosheng	June 1992	July 1994
Xiao Sijin	March 1995	February 1999
Jiang Yuande	February 1999	August 2002
Zhang Beisan	September 2002	April 2005
Zhang Bolun	May 2008	July 2011
Gao Kexiang	July 2011	August 2015
Cui Aimin	September 2015	February 2019
Gong Tao	March 2019	September 2023
Zhang Bin	February 2024	Incumbent

== See also ==
- Ambassadors of China
