= Sino-Portuguese =

Sino-Portuguese may refer to:

- Sino-Portuguese architecture
- Sino-Portuguese relations
