= Review of Books =

Review of Books' may refer to:

- Caribbean Review of Books
- Claremont Review of Books
- Jewish Review of Books
- London Review of Books
- Los Angeles Review of Books
- The New York Review of Books
- The New York Times Book Review
- San Francisco Review of Books
- Scottish Review of Books
- Shanghai Review of Books

== See also ==
- Book Review (disambiguation)
