= Gao Kexiang =

Chinese Diplomat

- 高克祥

Chinese Ambassador to Angola
- In office July 2011 – August 2015
- Preceded by: Zhang Bolun
- Succeeded by: Cui Aimin

Ambassador of China to Portugal
- In office August 2006 – May 2010
- Preceded by: Ma Enhan
- Succeeded by: Zhang Beisan

Ambassador of China to Guinea-Bissau
- In office September 2001 – December 2003
- Preceded by: Hong Hong
- Succeeded by: Tian Guangfeng

Personal details
- Born: October 1954 (age 70); China
- Political party: Chinese Communist Party
- Spouse: Li Feiyue
- Children: 1

Gao Kexiang (Chinese: 高克祥; pinyin: Gāo Kèxiáng) is a Chinese diplomat. He was Ambassador of the People's Republic of China to Guinea (2001–2003), Portugal (2006–2010), and Angola (2011–2015).

Diplomatic posts
Preceded by Hong Hong	Ambassador of China to Guinea-Bissau; 2001–2003	Succeeded by Tian Guangfeng
Preceded by Ma Enhan	Ambassador of China to Portugal; 2006–2010	Succeeded by Zhang Beisan
Preceded by Zhang Bolun	Chinese Ambassador to Angola; 2011–2015	Succeeded by Cui Aimin
