= List of ambassadors of China to Portugal =

Coordinates: 38.709463°N 9.163743°W

Ambassador of China to Portugal
- Incumbent; Cai Run since 1 August 2015
- Inaugural holder: Liu Shixun
- Formation: 22 May 1906; 120 years ago

The ambassador of China to Portugal is the official representative of the People's Republic of China to the Portuguese Republic.

== List of representatives ==
Diplomatic agrément/Diplomatic accreditation	Ambassador	Chinese language	Observations	Premier of the Republic of China	Prime Minister of Portugal	Term end
May 22, 1906	Liu Shixun	刘式训	The Qing government telegraphed the Chinese Minister to France and Spain, Liu Shixun, sending him to Lisbon to negotiate with the Portuguese government.	Empress Dowager Cixi	Carlos I of Portugal	November 20, 1911
November 23, 1912	Hu Weide	zh:胡惟德	With residence in Paris.	Zhao Bingjun	Manuel José de Arriaga	September 9, 1920
November 23, 1912			The governments in Lisbon and Beijing then Republic of China, established diplomatic relations.	Xiong Xiling	Manuel José de Arriaga	September 192,009
September 9, 1920	Dai Chen Lin	戴陈霖		Sun Baoqi	Manuel José de Arriaga	June 13, 1921
June 13, 1921	de:Liu Chongjie	zh:刘崇杰	With residence in Madrid.	Yan Huiqing	António José de Almeida	June 20, 1926
June 20, 1926	Wang Tingzhang	zh:王廷璋	Wang Tingzhang (1884-1944) o Ministro chinês em Portugal, em 1927	Du Xigui	José Mendes Cabeçadas Júnior	July 11, 1931
December 17, 1933	Chang Hsin-hai	zh:张歆海	From 1933 to 1937 he was Chinese minister plenipotentiary to Portugal, Portugal, and Czechoslovakia.	Wang Jingwei	António de Oliveira Salazar	June 25, 1934
August 20, 1934	Li Jinlun	zh:李锦纶 (外交官)		Wang Jingwei	António de Oliveira Salazar	September 7, 1943
November 6, 1943	Chang Chien (Henry K. Chang)	zh:张谦 (新会)	Studied in the United States and received a bachelor's degree in law from the University of Pennsylvania. After returning to the Qing Dynasty, take the exam.; In August 1929 became Consul General in San Francisco, in March 1931 in New York, the Consul General.; In May 1933 he became Minister envoy in Santiago de Chile.; In September 1943 he was appointed minister in Lisbon.; In 1944, he demanded a Portuguese withdraw from Macao and then on August 20, 1945, asked the Portuguese government to give up the consular jurisdiction in China.; On November 27, 1946 he became ambassador to the Netherlands.	Chiang Kai-shek	António de Oliveira Salazar	November 27, 1946
August 19, 1947	Wang Huacheng	zh:王化成	(*1905 - February 18, 1965 in Columbus Ohio): He was director of the Treaty Department of the Ministry of Foreign affairs.; Wang graduated from Tsinghua University, the University of Minnesota, the University of Chicago, and at Harvard University to study international public law. After returning home, he taught at the Department of Law, Peking University, Department of Political Science, Tsinghua University.	Chang Ch’ün	António de Oliveira Salazar	August 1, 1964
January 1, 1964	Benjamin B. Tu		Chargé d'affaires	Yen Chia-kan	Américo Tomás	
August 1, 1964	Wu Wen-hui		Chargé d'affaires 1967 Jan. 11—The Foreign Ministry announced recall of Wu Wenhui, Chargé d'affaires of the Chinese Legation in Lisbon, as a protest against Macao's surrender of seven anti-Communist Chinese to the Chinese Communists. Therefore, the Chinese government. decided in late January 1967 to recall Chinese chargé d'affaires Wu Wen-hui from Lisbon.	Yen Chia-kan	Américo Tomás	July 1, 1967
January 1, 1968	Stephen F. Wang		Chargé d'affaires	Yen Chia-kan	Américo Tomás	
January 1, 1972	Tu Pen-piao	杜光德	Chargé d'affaires	Yen Chia-kan	Américo Tomás	February 3, 1975
March 27, 1975			embassy closed.	Chiang Ching-kuo	Francisco da Costa Gomes	March 27, 1975

Diplomatic agrément/Diplomatic accreditation	Ambassador	Chinese language zh:中国驻葡萄牙大使列表	Observations	Premier of the People's Republic of China	Prime Minister of Portugal	Term end
February 8, 1979			The governments in Lisbon and Beijing established diplomatic relations.	Hua Guofeng	António Ramalho Eanes	
August 1, 1979	Yang Qiliang	zh:杨琪良		Hua Guofeng	António Ramalho Eanes	December 1, 1983
March 1, 1984	Lu Jixin	zh:陆济新		Zhao Ziyang	António Ramalho Eanes	December 1, 1986
January 1, 1987	Chen Ziying	zh:陈滋英		Li Peng	Mário Soares	June 1, 1989
August 1, 1989	Guo Jiading	zh:过家鼎		Li Peng	Mário Soares	January 1, 1993
February 1, 1993	Wu Tao (PRC diplomat)	zh:武韬		Li Peng	Mário Soares	July 1, 1994
August 1, 1994	Wei Dong	zh:韦东		Li Peng	Mário Soares	August 1, 1998
September 1, 1998	Wang Qiliang	zh:王其良		Zhu Rongji	Jorge Sampaio	January 1, 2000
March 1, 2000	Lu Boyuan	zh:陆伯源		Zhu Rongji	Jorge Sampaio	January 1, 2003
February 1, 2003	Ma Enhan	zh:马恩汉		Wen Jiabao	Jorge Sampaio	July 1, 2006
August 1, 2006	Gao Kexiang	zh:高克祥		Wen Jiabao	Aníbal Cavaco Silva	May 1, 2010
May 1, 2010	Zhang Beisan	zh:张备三		Wen Jiabao	Aníbal Cavaco Silva	February 25, 2013
February 25, 2013	Huang Songfu	黄松甫		Li Keqiang	Pedro Passos Coelho	August 1, 2015
August 1, 2015	Cai Run	蔡潤		Li Keqiang	Pedro Passos Coelho	

== See also ==
- China–Portugal relations
