= Zhao Zhenkui =

Chinese diplomat

Zhao Zhenkui (Chinese: 赵振魁) (born 1926) was a Chinese diplomat who served as the first Chinese Ambassador to Angola.

Preceded by Position established	Chinese Ambassador to Angola; 1984–1988	Succeeded by Hu Lipeng
