= List of ambassadors of China to Guinea-Bissau =

The ambassador of China to Guinea-Bissau is the official representative of the People's Republic of China to Guinea-Bissau.

== List of representatives ==
| Name (English) | Name (Chinese) | Tenure begins | Tenure ends | Note |
|---|---|---|---|---|
| Qian Qichen | 钱其琛 | September 1974 | October 1975 | |
| Li Zhenhai | 李振海 | March 1975 | February 1976 | Chargé d'affaires |
| Jia Huaiji | 贾怀济 | February 1976 | November 1979 | |
| Liu Yingxian | 刘英仙 | March 1980 | November 1983 | |
| Hu Jingrui | 胡景瑞 | January 1984 | May 1987 | |
| Shi Wushan | 石午山 | December 1987 | June 1990 | |
| Hong Hong | 洪虹 | May 1998 | July 1999 | Chargé d'affaires |
| Hong Hong | 洪虹 | July 1999 | August 2001 | |
| Gao Kexiang | 高克祥 | September 2001 | December 2003 | |
| Tian Guangfeng | 田广凤 | January 2004 | February 2007 | |
| Yan Banghua | 严邦华 | February 2007 | October 2010 | |
| Li Baojun | 李宝钧 | October 2010 | July 2013 | |
| Wang Hua | 王华 | July 2013 | March 2017 | |
| Jin Hongjun | 金红军 | April 2017 | August 2020 | |
| Guo Ce | 郭策 | October 2020 | | |

== See also ==
- China–Guinea-Bissau relations
