= List of ambassadors of China to Mozambique =

Coordinates: 25.954396°S 32.604819°E

Chinese Ambassador to Mozambique
- Incumbent; Su Jian since July 2015
- Inaugural holder: Lin Zhong
- Formation: June 1975; 51 years ago

The Chinese ambassador to Mozambique is the official representative of the People's Republic of China to the Republic of Mozambique.

== List of representatives ==
| Diplomatic agrément/Diplomatic accreditation | Ambassador | Chinese language zh:中国驻莫桑比克大使列表 | Observations | Premier of China | List of heads of state of Mozambique | Term end |
|---|---|---|---|---|---|---|
| June 25, 1975 | | | *The governments in Maputo and Beijing established diplomatic relations. | Hua Guofeng | Samora Machel | |
| June 1975 | Lin Zhong | zh:林中 | From August 1971 to June 1975 he was ambassador in Algiers (Algeria).; From June 1975 to January 1971 he was ambassador in Maputo (Mozambique).; From March 1983 to January 1986 he was ambassador om Rome (Italy). | Zhou Enlai | Samora Machel | January 1977 |
| November 1977 | Yang Shouzheng | zh:杨守正 | (*1915): From September 1964 to March 1967 he was ambassador in Somalia. From April 1970 to April 1974 he was ambassador in Khartoum Sudan.; From December 1974 to July 1977 he was ambassador in Ethiopia.; From November 1977 to January 1980 he was ambassador in Mozambique.; From April 1980 to January 1985 Ambassador of in Moscow (Soviet Union) | Hua Guofeng | Samora Machel | January 1980 |
| June 1981 | Wang Jinchuan | zh:王锦川 | On December 7, 1971, China established diplomatic relations with Senegal. Wang Jinchuan served as the first ambassador to China in Senegal.; From July 1971 to August 1977 he was ambassador in Senegal.; From December 1977 to January 1981 he was ambassador in Ethiopia; From June 1981 to August 1982 he was ambassador in Mozambique. | Zhao Ziyang | Samora Machel | August 1982 |
| December 1982 | Wang Hao | 王浩 | | Zhao Ziyang | Samora Machel | August 1986 |
| September 1986 | Zhang Baosheng | zh:张宝生 | From September 1986 to April 1989 he was ambassador in Mozambique.; From June 1992 to July 1994 he was ambassador in Angola. | Zhao Ziyang | Samora Machel | April 1989 |
| July 1989 | Xiao Sijin | zh:肖思晋 | From July 1989 to August 1993 he was ambassador in Mozambique.; From March 1995 to February 1999 he was ambassador in Angola. | Li Peng | Joaquim Alberto Chissano | August 1993 |
| September 1993 | Mi Shiheng | 宓世衡 | | Li Peng | Joaquim Alberto Chissano | November 1996 |
| December 1996 | Shao Guanfu | 邵关福 | | Li Peng | Joaquim Alberto Chissano | July 2000 |
| September 2000 | Chen Duqing | zh:陈笃庆 | From September 2000 - March 2004 he was ambassador in Mozambique.; From August 2002 to August 2004 he was ambassador in Timor-Leste.; From April 2006 to February 2009 he was ambassador in Brasília (Brazil). | Zhu Rongji | Joaquim Alberto Chissano | March 2004 |
| April 2004 | Hong Hong | zh:洪虹 | From May 1998 to August 2001 he was ambassador in Guinea-Bissau.; From January 2002 to January 2004 he was ambassador in Cape Verde.; From April 2004 to February 2007 he was ambassador in Mozambique | Wen Jiabao | Joaquim Alberto Chissano | February 2007 |
| March 2007 | Tian Guangfeng | zh:田广凤 | *From January 2004 to February 2007 Ambassador of China to Guinea-Bissau. *From March 2007 - July 2010 Ambassador of China to Mozambique *From January 2012 - June 2015 Ambassador of China to Timor-Leste | Wen Jiabao | Armando Guebuza | March 2010 |
| March 2010 | Huang Songfu | 黄松甫 | | Wen Jiabao | Armando Guebuza | December 2012 |
| December 2012 | Li Chunhua | 李春华 | | Wen Jiabao | Armando Guebuza | July 2015 |
| July 2015 | Su Jian | 蘇 | | Li Keqiang | Filipe Nyusi | |
