= Zhang Baosheng (diplomat) =

Chinese diplomat

Zhang Baosheng (Chinese: 张宝生) was a Chinese diplomat who served as the Chinese Ambassador to Mozambique between 1986 and 1989, and the Chinese Ambassador to Angola between 1992 and 1994.

Preceded by	Chinese Ambassador to Mozambique	Succeeded by Xiao Sijin
Preceded by Hu Lipeng	Chinese Ambassador to Angola; 1992–1994	Succeeded by Xiao Sijin
