= Book Review (disambiguation) =

Book review is a form of literary criticism in which a book is analyzed based on content, style, and merit.

Book Review may refer to:

- The Book Review (India)
- American Book Review
- Australian Book Review
- Black Issues Book Review
- Electronic Book Review
- Midwest Book Review
- Swedish Book Review
- The New York Times Book Review
- Weekly Comic Book Review
- Wenhui Book Review

== See also ==
- Book Revue (cartoon short), later re-issued as Book Review, a Looney Tunes cartoon short featuring Daffy Duck
- Book Review Index
- Review of Books (disambiguation)
