= Hu Lipeng =

Chinese diplomat

Hu Lipeng (Chinese: 胡立鹏) was a Chinese diplomat who served as the Chinese Ambassador to Angola between 1988 and 1992, and the Chinese Ambassador to Nigeria between 1992 and 1995.

Preceded by Zhao Zhenkui	Chinese Ambassador to Angola; 1988–1992	Succeeded by Zhang Baosheng
Preceded by	Chinese Ambassador to Nigeria; 1992–1995	Succeeded by Lü Fengding
