= Michael Keevak =

American historian

- Born: Michael Louis Keevak; May 29, 1962 (age 64); St. Louis, Missouri, United States
- Occupations: Academic, historian, author
- Employer: National Taiwan University
- Known for: Research on Western perceptions of Asia, racial thinking
- Title: Distinguished Professor
- Awards: Academia Sinica Scholarly Monograph Award (2013)

Academic background
- Education: Columbia University (BA); Yale University (PhD)
- Thesis: The effect of address in four seventeenth century examples (1991)

Academic work
- Discipline: Cultural history, Asian studies, Literary studies
- Sub-discipline: Intellectual history, Race and ethnic studies, East-West cultural encounters, History of racial thought

Michael Louis Keevak (born May 29, 1962) is an American historian. He is a distinguished professor in the department of foreign languages and literatures at National Taiwan University. Keevak is known primarily for his work on early modern European-Asian cultural encounters and the historical construction of racial categories. His book Becoming Yellow: A Short History of Racial Thinking, received the 2013 Academia Sinica Scholarly Monograph Award in the Humanities and Social Sciences.

== Early life and education ==
Keevak was born in St. Louis, Missouri. He received his Bachelor of Arts degree in English and history from Columbia University in 1984 and his Ph.D. in Renaissance studies from Yale University in 1991. His doctoral dissertation, "The Effect of Address in Four Seventeenth-Century Examples," argued how seventeenth-century texts—including works by Descartes, Rembrandt's self-portraits, and Hobbes's Leviathan—embody mechanisms of "address" that shape reader response and interpretation.

== Career ==
Keevak joined the faculty of National Taiwan University in 1993 as an Associate Professor and was promoted to Professor in 2001. In August 2024, he was appointed Distinguished Professor.

He was a Visitor at the Institute for Advanced Study in Princeton from January to June 2007, and served as a Visiting Fellow in the Department of History at Princeton University in 2009 and 2011. Keevak was also Visiting Fellow at Penn State, University of Hamburg (as DAAD Guest Professor), University of Amsterdam, University of Utrecht, and SOAS. (Note: Funded by Taiwan awards, except Penn State and Hamburg (DAAD).)

Sexual Shakespeare: Forgery, Authorship, Portraiture (2001) examines how questions about Shakespeare's sexuality have permeated biographical and critical discussions since the late eighteenth century. The book demonstrates that attempts to "authenticate" Shakespeare inevitably involve either sexualizing or desexualizing him, revealing more about cultural anxieties than historical facts. Through four case studies—including William Henry Ireland's 1795 forgeries, the Davenant paternity rumors, the authorship controversy, and analysis of Shakespeare's portraits—Keevak traces how the absence of concrete biographical details has prompted endless speculation about the playwright's sexuality. His work contends that biographical interpretations of Shakespeare, particularly readings of the Sonnets, function as "biographical fantasy" that reflects contemporary debates rather than uncovering authentic truths.

His 2004 book, The Pretended Asian: George Psalmanazar's Eighteenth-Century Formosan Hoax (Wayne State University Press), investigates the case of George Psalmanazar, an 18th-century European impostor who successfully posed as a native of Formosa (Taiwan) in early 1700s London. In the book, Keevak analyzes the historical and cultural contexts that enabled a fair-skinned European to convince British society he was Asian, arguing that the deception succeeded because modern concepts of race had not yet developed in early 18th-century Europe. Nick Groom in The Review of English Studies calling it a "useful study" that illuminates "the early eighteenth-century encounter with otherness," while critic Jonathan Ball described it as "undoubtedly the best existing work concerning Psalmanazar's life and fraud."

His book The Story of a Stele: China's Nestorian Monument and Its Reception in the West, 1625-1916 (2008), documents how Western missionaries, scholars, and adventurers responded to the discovery of an eighth-century Chinese Christian monument in Xi'an. In the book, Keevak argues that for nearly three centuries, Europeans projected their own religious and cultural preoccupations onto this artifact, seeing it as proof of ancient Christianity in China rather than understanding it within its actual historical and cultural context. He traces debates over the monument's authenticity, attempts to acquire or copy it for Western museums, and how it became a mirror for Western self-interest rather than a genuine engagement with Chinese history. Through analysis of sources from the seventeenth through early twentieth centuries, Keevak demonstrates how the monument became a focal point for Western fantasies about China and Christianity, revealing more about European prejudices and desires than about the stone itself.

His book Becoming Yellow: A Short History of Racial Thinking (Princeton University Press, 2011) traces the historical shift in Western perceptions of East Asian skin color from "white" to "yellow." Keevak demonstrates that early Western travelers, including Marco Polo, and eighteenth-century missionaries described East Asians as having white skin, but by the nineteenth century this characterization had changed to yellow. The book identifies key figures in this transformation, including Carl Linnaeus, who in his 1758-9 Systema Naturae used the term "luridus" (light yellow), and Johann Friedrich Blumenbach, who introduced the concept of "Mongolianness" to racial classification. Keevak argues that the yellow label became associated with discrimination, exclusion, and concepts like the "yellow peril," serving to establish a racial hierarchy. The work, which includes extensive scholarly apparatus with footnotes and references comprising a third of its 248 pages, has been translated into Korean (2016), with Keevak adding a new introduction asking whether it is time to stop using such discriminatory terminology. The book received the 2013 Academia Sinica Scholarly Monograph Award in the Humanities and Social Sciences, and has been translated into Traditional Chinese, (Note: Published by Ba Qi Culture in Taiwain in 2015, under the title 成為黃種人：一部東亞人由白變黃的歷史, translated by Wu Wei-Jiang.) Simplified Chinese, (Note: Published by Zhejiang People's Publishing House in Mainland China in 2016, translated by Fang Xiaotian.) Korean, and Turkish. A chapter from Becoming Yellow titled "Measuring Skin Color and The Color Top" is scheduled to be reprinted in an edited volume, Color Protocols: Technologies of Racial Encoding in Chromatic Media, edited by Carolyn L. Kane and Lida Zeitlin-Wu, and will be published by MIT Press in September 2025.

In Embassies to China: Diplomacy and Cultural Encounters Before the Opium Wars (2017), Keevak analyzes five centuries of European diplomatic missions to China from the 13th to 19th centuries, analyzing how fundamental Western concepts like "peace," "empire," "trade," "religion," and "diplomacy" were misunderstood or rejected when translated into Chinese cultural contexts. Through case studies of embassies from the Papal States, Portugal, Holland, and Russia, Keevak demonstrates how China consistently maintained the upper hand in these encounters, forcing Western envoys to conform to Chinese tribute systems while denying their requests for free trade, territorial concessions, and religious freedoms. The book reveals that these diplomatic failures stemmed not merely from cultural misunderstandings but from China's deliberate policy of maintaining superiority over foreign "barbarians," with Russia being the notable exception due to its strategic importance in Central Asian border security.

His book On Saving Face: A Brief History of Western Appropriation (Hong Kong University Press, 2022) argues that the concept of "saving face," commonly attributed to Chinese culture, was actually created and popularized by Westerners. Keevak traces the earliest English usage to 1839 in the context of the opium trade, identifying American missionary Arthur Smith as instrumental in popularizing the term in the late 19th century. The book contends that while the original meaning was simply to avoid humiliation, Western discourse transformed "saving face" into a characterization of Chinese deception and duplicity in business dealings, using it to justify their own positions in trade and diplomatic conflicts. The work examines the concept across multiple historical periods, from early missionary accounts through international diplomacy to modern usage, and includes analysis of Chinese literary references such as Lu Xun's writings. In his review for The Taipei Times, Bradley Winterton, noted that this is one of the few Keevak books to include Chinese characters, describing it as "extremely thorough" and likely to be "the most influential" of Keevak's published books.

His most recent book is Chinaman: A Short History of an Ugly English Word (Hong Kong University Press, 2027).

April 2021, Keevak delivered the inaugural lecture for the University of Illinois' "Yellow Peril Redux" online speaker series, presenting his research from Becoming Yellow. In the talk, he argued that the designation of East Asians as "yellow" did not originate from eyewitness descriptions by European travelers, who initially described Chinese and Japanese people as "white" in texts from the 16th to 18th centuries. Instead, Keevak traced the emergence of "yellow" to 18th-century scientific racial classification systems, particularly the taxonomic work of Carl Linnaeus, who in 1735 first used the Latin term "fuscus" (dark) for Asians before changing it to "luridus" (lurid or sallow) in 1758, and Johann Friedrich Blumenbach, who in 1795 first explicitly used "gilvus" (yellow) to describe what he termed the "Mongolian" race. Keevak emphasized that these color designations emerged from attempts to create racial hierarchies rather than from actual observation, noting that the concept of yellowness "has nothing to do with physical appearance" but rather "comes from a racialized vision of the world." During the Q&A session, he expressed concern about contemporary attempts to reclaim the term "yellow," arguing that its origins in Western racial science make such appropriation problematic.

== Awards ==
- Academia Sinica Scholarly Monograph Award for Becoming Yellow (2013)
- Outstanding Research Award, National Science and Technology Council, Taiwan (2024)

== Selected publications ==
=== Books ===
- Sexual Shakespeare: Forgery, Authorship, Portraiture. Detroit: Wayne State University Press, 2001. ISBN 978-0814329511
- The Pretended Asian: George Psalmanazar's Eighteenth-Century Formosan Hoax. Detroit: Wayne State University Press, 2004. ISBN 978-0814331989
- The Story of a Stele: China's Nestorian Monument and Its Reception in the West, 1625-1916. Hong Kong: Hong Kong University Press, 2008. ISBN 978-9622098954
- Becoming Yellow: A Short History of Racial Thinking. Princeton: Princeton University Press, 2011. ISBN 978-0691140315
- Embassies to China: Diplomacy and Cultural Encounters Before the Opium Wars. Singapore: Palgrave Macmillan, 2017. ISBN 978-9811039713
- On Saving Face: A Brief History of Western Appropriation. Hong Kong: Hong Kong University Press, 2022. ISBN 978-9888754281
- Chinaman: A Short History of an Ugly English Word. Hong Kong: Hong Kong University Press, 2027. ISBN 978-9888946990

=== Edited volumes ===
- Early Encounters Between East Asia and Europe: Telling Failures, ed. Ralf Hertel and Michael Keevak (London: Routledge, 2017)

=== Book chapters ===
- Measuring Skin Color and The Color Top, Color Protocols: Technologies of Racial Encoding in Chromatic Media, ed. Carolyn L. Kane and Lida Zeitlin-Wu (Cambridge MA: MIT Press, 2025), 85-102. ISBN 9780262553506
