= China–Portugal relations =

- China: Portugal

Diplomatic mission
- Embassy of China, Lisbon: Embassy of Portugal, Beijing

China–Portugal relations, (Note: (Portuguese: Relações entre a República Portuguesa e a República Popular da China ou Relações China-Portugal, simplified Chinese: 葡萄牙共和国与中华人民共和国的关系 或者 中葡关系; traditional Chinese: 葡萄牙共和國與中華人民共和國的關係 或者 中葡關係; pinyin: Pútáoyá gònghéguó yǔ zhōnghuá rénmín gònghéguó de guānxì huò zhōng pú guānxì)) can be traced to 1514 during the Ming dynasty of China. Relations between the modern political entities of the People's Republic of China and the Portuguese Republic officially began on 2 February 1979. China and Portugal established a comprehensive strategic partnership in 2005. Both nations maintain friendly relations, which is due to three main reasons – the first being the Portuguese handover of Macau in 1999, the second being the Portuguese prominence in the Lusophone, which includes nations China wishes to promote relations with, and third being the extensive history of Portuguese presence in Asia.

== Economic relations ==
Trade between the two countries have increased since the resolution of the longstanding issue of Macau's future and the economic reforms of Deng Xiaoping in the early 1980s. In 2002, trade between the two countries was valued at $380 million.

China's exports to Portugal are textile goods, garments, shoes, plastics, acoustic equipment, steel materials, ceramic goods and lighting equipment. China is Portugal's ninth-largest trading partner.

Portugal's exports to China are electric condensers and accessory parts, primary plastics, paper, medicinal, textile goods and wine.

Portugal participated in Shanghai's Expo 2010 to boost bilateral trade further.

Portugal joined the Belt and Road Initiative (BRI) in 2018.

== Cultural relations ==
During the celebration of the Year of the Rooster, the Chinese Lunar New Year that fell on 28 January 2017, a huge rooster, the symbol of Portugal, created by famous Portuguese artist Joana Vasconcelos, was ferried to China from Lisbon to congratulate the Chinese with New Year greetings.

== History ==
=== Contemporary era ===
Following World War II, the United Nations expected its member states to relinquish any colonies. Portuguese Prime Minister Antonio Salazar sought to resist UN pressure to relinquish Macau. In 1951, the Salazar regime sought to re-characterize Macau not as a colony but as an overseas province of Portugal, which it viewed as part of a plural-continental but nonetheless unified and indivisible Portuguese state.

The Portuguese Estado Novo adopted the idea of Lusotropicalism, which sought to cast Portugal's imperialism as a "better" form of colonialism. It contended that Portugal peacefully fostered beneficial race-mixing, while the northern European countries had engaged in true colonialism. As applied by the Portuguese to Macau, this narrative was favorably viewed in China as consistent with the narrative that Portugal had not colonized Macau, but had only been "allowed" to administer Macau.

After the Carnation Revolution, Portugal began its process of decolonization. Over the next several years, Portugal made two offers to return Macau, both of which were rejected by the Chinese government. In 1979, following the formal establishment of diplomatic relations, the two countries reached a secret agreement to characterise Macau as a "Chinese territory under Portuguese administration".

Relations between Portugal and China began to improve as talks in relation to Macau's future were conducted, and a final agreement was reached, with Macau being returned to Chinese sovereignty in 1999. After Macau was returned to China, its ties with Portugal have largely been based on cultural and economic exchanges.

China and Portugal both participated in the multi-lateral group Forum Macao, which China formed in 2003 in order to increase economic and commercial cooperation between China and the Portuguese-speaking countries.

== Resident diplomatic missions ==
of China in Portugal

- Lisbon (Embassy)

of Portugal in China

- Beijing (Embassy)
- Guangzhou (Consulate-General)
- Macau (Consulate-General)
- Shanghai (Consulate-General)

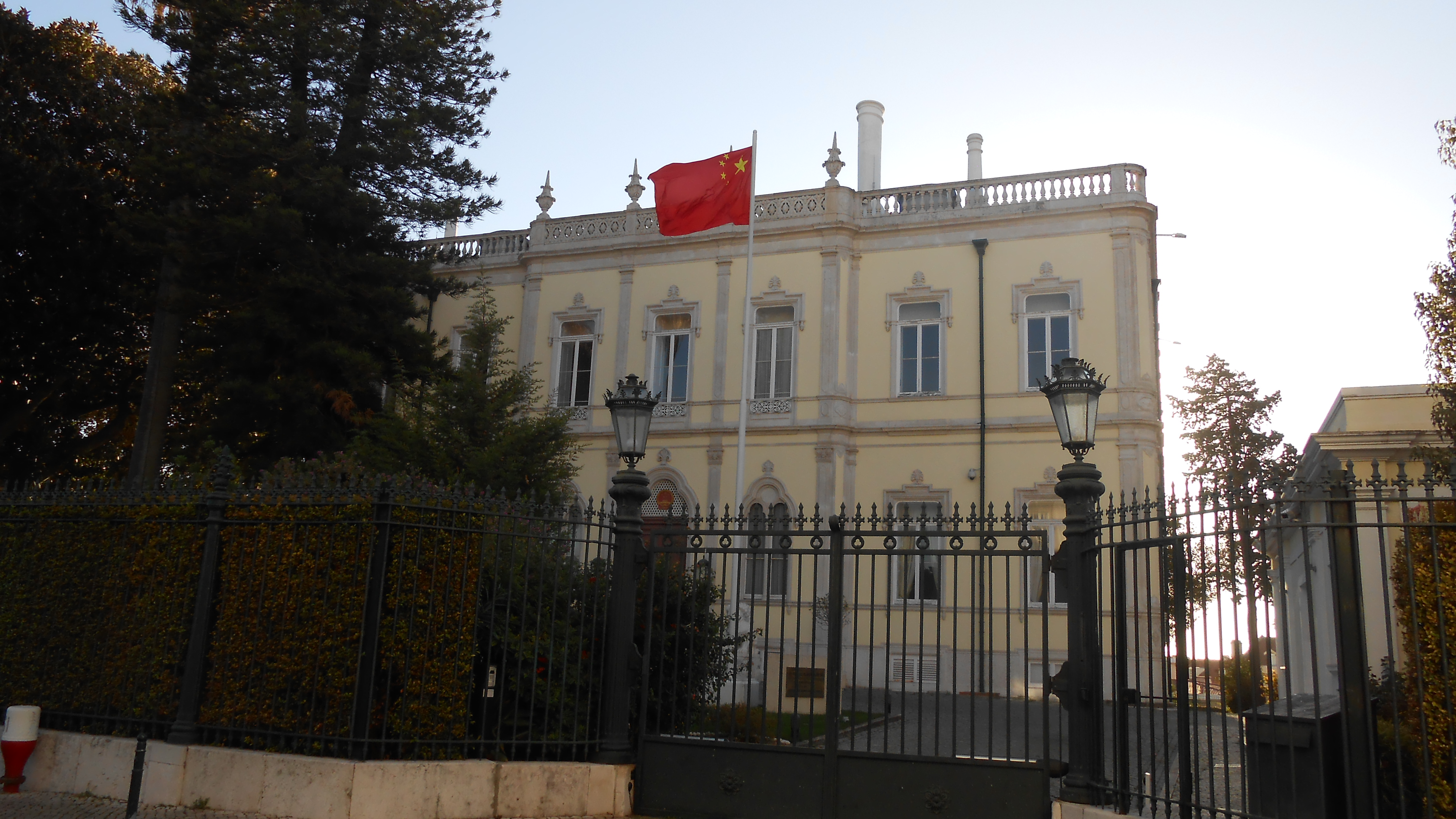
Embassy of China in Lisbon

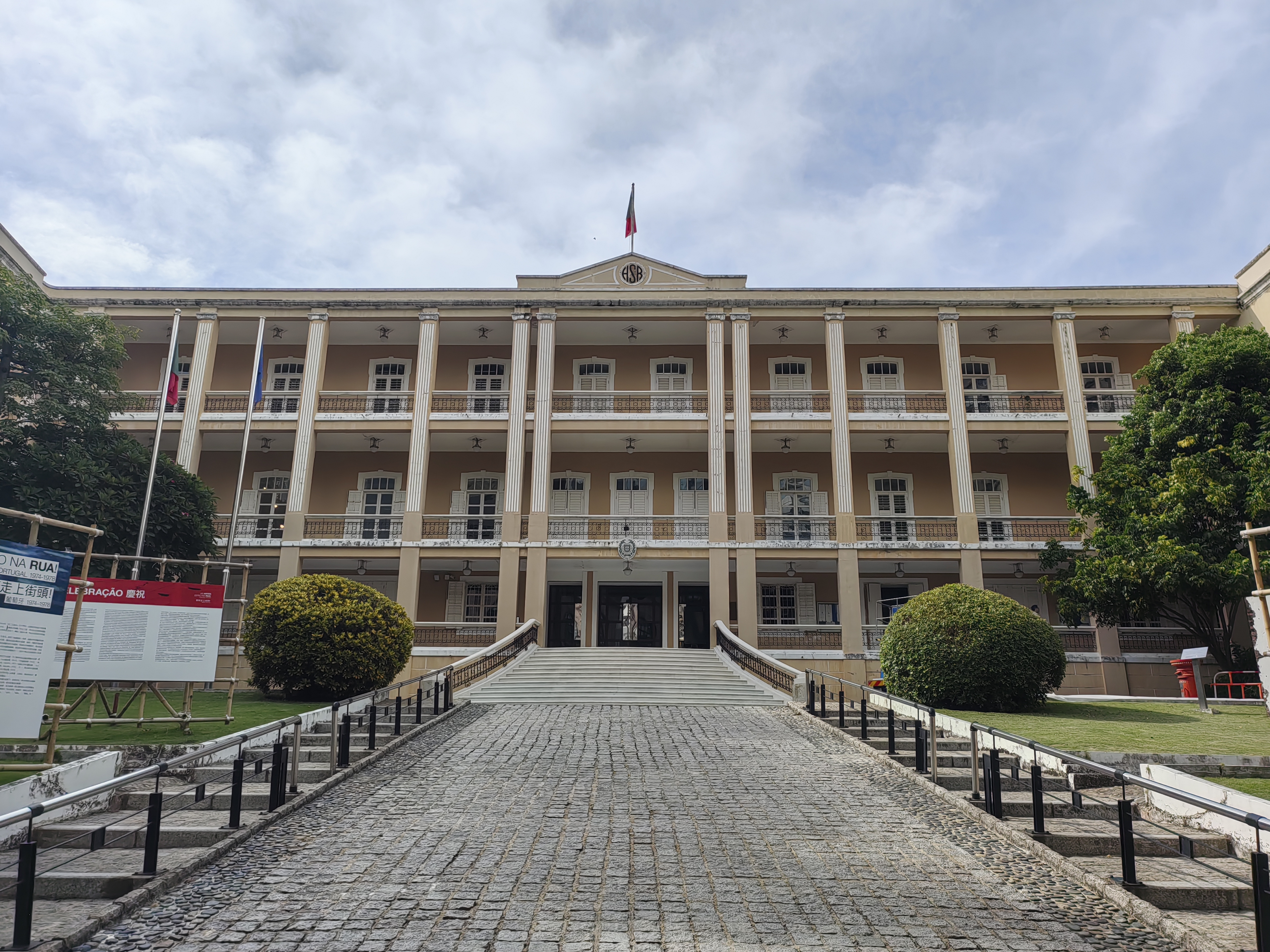
Consulate-General of Portugal in Macau

== See also ==
- Portuguese Macau (1557–1999)
- Foreign relations of China
- Foreign relations of Portugal
- History of Macau
- Chinese people in Portugal
- List of ambassadors of China to Portugal
- List of ambassadors of Portugal to China

== Sources ==
- This article incorporates text from The rise of Portuguese power in India, 1497–1550, by Richard Stephen Whiteway, a publication from 1899, now in the public domain in the United States.
- This article incorporates text from Historic Macao, by Carlos Augusto Montalto Jesus, a publication from 1902, now in the public domain in the United States.
- This article incorporates text from The works of the English poets, from Chaucer to Cowper: including the series edited with prefaces, biographical and critical, by Samuel Johnson, a publication from 1810, now in the public domain in the United States.
- This article incorporates text from The Percy anecdotes: Original and select, by Sholto Percy, Reuben Percy, a publication from 1826, now in the public domain in the United States.
- This article incorporates text from A history of Japan during the century of early foreign intercourse, 1542–1651, a publication from 1903, now in the public domain in the United States.
- This article incorporates text from A history of Japan, Volume 2, by Joseph Henry Longford, L. M. C. Hall, a publication from 1903, now in the public domain in the United States.
- This article incorporates text from The Mirror of literature, amusement, and instruction, Volume 7, a publication from 1845, now in the public domain in the United States.
- Keevak, Michael (18 April 2011). Becoming Yellow: A Short History of Racial Thinking. Princeton and Oxford: Princeton University Press.
- Ptak, Roderich (1992), "Early Sino-Portuguese relations up to the Foundation of Macao", Mare Liberum, Revista de História dos Mares (4), Lisbon
