= Zhang Beisan =

Chinese diplomat (born 1952)

- 张备三

Chinese Ambassador to Portugal
- In office May 2010 – February 2013
- Preceded by: Gao Kexiang
- Succeeded by: Huang Songfu

Chinese Ambassador to Angola
- In office September 2002 – May 2008 (Note: According to the information disclosed by the PRC Foreign Ministry, Zhang's term ended in 2005. However it is not the case in his CV published on the Chinese Embassy in Portugal website, and a conference paper presented in 2008.)
- Preceded by: Jiang Yuande
- Succeeded by: Zhang Bolun

Personal details
- Born: February 1952 (age 74) Zhejiang, China
- Children: 1
- Occupation: Diplomat

Zhang Beisan (Chinese: 张备三, born 1952), Chinese diplomat, is the former Ambassador to Angola and Portugal of the People's Republic of China.

== Early life ==
He replaced Jiang Yuande (Chinese: 蒋元德) as the Chinese Ambassador to Angola from 2002 through 2005 under the appointment of the then-Chinese President Jiang Zemin, and was succeeded by Zhang Bolun (Chinese: 张伯伦) in May 2008. He was then appointed Ambassador to Portugal, in place of Gao Kexiang.

On 25 February 2013, the then-Chinese President Hu Jintao announced the appointment of Huang Songfu as new Ambassador to Portugal.

== See also ==
- Sino-Angolan relations
- Sino-Portuguese relations
