= Becoming Yellow: A Short History of Racial Thinking =

2011 book by Michael Keevak

- Cover
- Author: Michael Keevak
- Language: English
- Subject: Race studies, Asian studies, history
- Publisher: Princeton University Press
- Publication date: 2011
- Publication place: United States
- Pages: 248
- Awards: 2013 Academia Sinica Scholarly Monograph Award in the Humanities and Social Sciences
- ISBN: 9780691140315

Becoming Yellow: A Short History of Racial Thinking is a 2011 book by American historian Michael Keevak, published by Princeton University Press. Keevak traces how East Asians, who were initially described as "white" by early European observers, came to be categorized as "yellow" people by the nineteenth century. He argues that this transformation was not based on empirical observation but rather emerged through scientific classification systems, anthropological theories, and Western political anxieties about Asia. The book has been translated into Traditional Chinese, Simplified Chinese, Korean, and Turkish. The book won the 2013 Academia Sinica Scholarly Monograph Award in the Humanities and Social Sciences.

== Background ==
Becoming Yellow investigates a paradox in the history of Western racial thinking about East Asia. When Portuguese missionaries and traders first reached China and Japan in the 16th century via their circuitous route around Africa and through the Indian Ocean, they encountered sophisticated civilizations that surprised them with their wealth, literacy, and cultural refinement. These early European observers routinely described the Chinese and Japanese as "white people"—a term that carried not only descriptive but evaluative weight, signifying superiority and civilization. Yet by the late 18th century, this characterization had vanished entirely, replaced by the now-familiar but deeply problematic designation of East Asians as "yellow."

== Summary ==
Keevak traces the surprising transformation in how Europeans perceived the skin color of East Asians, revealing how racial categories that seem natural are actually recent historical constructions. Keevak demonstrates that from the thirteenth century through the early modern period, European travelers, merchants, and missionaries consistently described the inhabitants of China and Japan as white or pale-skinned. Marco Polo's thirteenth-century accounts specifically described both Chinese and Japanese as "white" (bianca), while subsequent observers used terms like "white," "olive," or "tawny." Even into the eighteenth century, important sources such as the Jesuit missionaries A. Semedo and J.-B. Du Halde continued to emphasize the whiteness of East Asians, often comparing them favorably to Europeans.

The transformation began during the Enlightenment with the rise of scientific classification systems. While François Bernier's 1684 essay has been credited with establishing racial categories, Keevak shows he actually called East Asians "véritablement blanc" (truly white) and applied "yellow" only to some Indians. Carl Linnaeus initially classified Asians as "fuscus" (dark) in 1735, only changing to "luridus" (pale yellow, lurid, ghastly) in 1758–59. Most significantly, Johann Friedrich Blumenbach not only designated East Asians as yellow (using "gilvus") but created the new racial category "Mongolian," linking contemporary East Asians with historical invaders like Attila the Hun and Genghis Khan—an association particularly ironic given that Chinese and Japanese had historically viewed Mongols as barbarian invaders.

During the nineteenth century, the supposed scientific validation of racial categories intensified. Anthropologists developed elaborate measurement tools, including Milton Bradley's "color top" with white, black, red, and yellow disks, which inevitably confirmed East Asians as yellow because researchers began with that assumption. Medical discourse further entrenched these categories through race-specific conditions: the "Mongolian eye fold," "Mongolian spots" (bluish birthmarks), and most problematically, "Mongolism" (Down syndrome), which suggested that affected individuals had "regressed" to a supposedly inferior racial form. These medical classifications reinforced stereotypes of East Asians as permanently infantile and developmentally static.

The concept crystallized politically with Kaiser Wilhelm II's coining of "Yellow Peril" in 1895, following Japan's victory in the Sino-Japanese War. The Kaiser's commissioned allegorical painting showed European nations threatened by an Asian Buddha riding storm clouds, creating a flexible concept that could target any East Asian nation and encompass various anxieties about overpopulation, paganism, economic competition, and military threat.

Keevak reveals how East Asians themselves responded to Western racial paradigms in complex ways. In China, where yellow held positive imperial connotations as the color of the Yellow Emperor, the concept could be proudly inverted, though Chinese rejected "Mongolian" due to historical associations. Japanese intellectuals largely rejected both yellow and Mongolian, preferring alignment with the "white race" and applying these terms only to other Asians.

Keevak's central argument demonstrates that East Asian "yellowness" resulted from a complex interplay of scientific theorizing, medical practice, and political anxieties rather than observable physical reality. By tracing the transformation from white to yellow across centuries, he illuminates how racial categories operate through circular reasoning—researchers used measurement tools to "prove" predetermined conclusions about difference and hierarchy. The work's significance lies in showing how scientifically baseless ideas became so embedded in both Western and Eastern thought that they shaped international relations, immigration policies, and cultural representations for generations. Ultimately, Keevak reveals that by the early twentieth century, the very arbitrariness of these racial categories had been forgotten, replaced by a false sense of their natural and timeless character.

== Reviews ==
In his review of the book for the Shanghai Review of Books, Luo Xin praised it book as "an excellent textbook for reflecting on racial thinking" and considered it particularly important for Chinese intellectual circles. Luo emphasized that Keevak showed how the classification of East Asians as "yellow" was not based on empirical observation but was "entirely a new invention of modern science" that emerged in the mid-eighteenth century. He noted that the book traced the disturbing trajectory of scientific racism, from Linnaeus's search for a color "suggesting sickness and unhealthiness" to describe Asians, through the medicalization of racial categories, to the eventual internalization of these Western concepts by Asian societies themselves. Luo stressed Keevak's relevance for contemporary China, where racial thinking persisted in academic and popular discourse despite being largely abandoned in Western scholarship. He argued that understanding this history was essential to recognize "how absurd and dangerous racial concepts and racial classification knowledge are."

James Leibold found Keevak's book to provide "the single best history of Western racial thought as it relates to East Asia," meticulously demonstrating how the taxonomic designation "yellow" emerged arbitrarily and contingently in the nineteenth century. The book revealed that early European travel and missionary accounts described East Asians as white or pale-skinned, gradually shifting through intermediate hues—from terms like "red," "brown," "mulberry," "olive," "bronze," and "tawny" to bizarre combinations such as "very pale yellow orange entering into pistachio green"—before finally settling on yellow. Leibold detailed how Western natural scientists employed new tools to determine skin color, including Paul Broca's thirty-four color swatch cards, Arthur Hintze's fan-like palette of 358 colors, and the "color-top" adapted from a Milton Bradley children's toy. While praising Keevak's research as "wonderfully produced" and filled with "loads of new detail," Leibold criticized the book's crucial weakness: its failure to adequately address how these Western racial categories were received and transformed in East Asian intellectual history. The ten-page section on reception in China and Japan was deemed "largely unsatisfactory" and "too truncated," oversimplifying complex responses to Western racial thinking. Leibold argued that any complete history of racial thinking must account for how Western categories circulated globally and were "translated, recast, and indigenized as part of what Prasenjit Duara calls the East Asian modern," suggesting this represents the book's most significant shortcoming despite its otherwise masterful execution.

Paul Turnbull found the book useful for illuminating how the attribution of yellow skin to East Asians arose from 19th-century medical-scientific and anthropological discourses, but he considered it frustratingly short. He valued Keevak's discussion of 18th-century ideas about human variation and appreciated the connections drawn between East Asian bodies and contagious diseases in European imagination. However, he criticized the book for dealing too briefly with important matters - he wanted more information about Linnaeus and Blumenbach's sources, deeper analysis of how Western scientific circles understood East Asian peoples' evolutionary genealogy, and greater examination of how Chinese and Japanese culture influenced Western perceptions. Turnbull hoped the author would pursue these issues more thoroughly in future work, as every chapter left him wanting more depth than the book provided.

Tjalling Halbertsma praised the book as a skillful and convincing examination of how East Asians came to be racially designated as "yellow" in Western thought. Halbertsma appreciated how Keevak traced this racial categorization from early European accounts (which actually described East Asians as white) through the development of scientific taxonomy in the 18th and 19th centuries, showing how figures like Carl Linnaeus introduced the yellow designation that eventually became a persistent stereotype. While acknowledging the book was "not always an easy read" due to its handling of contentious racial terminology, Halbertsma concluded it was a valuable introduction to understanding the origins and development of this European racial stereotype of East Asia.

Historian Bo Tao of Chiba University analyzed how Keevak investigated the origins of East Asians' racial designation as "yellow" in Western thought, beginning with the contemporary relevance of "yellow peril" discourse during COVID-19. Tao traced Keevak's study through five chapters: pre-eighteenth century travel accounts that described East Asians as "white" rather than yellow; the development of racial taxonomies from Bernier through Linnaeus to Blumenbach, who introduced the "Mongolian" category; nineteenth-century anthropological efforts to measure and validate skin color as racial difference; medical discourse that attached "Mongolian" to various conditions including Down syndrome; and the emergence of "yellow peril" rhetoric at the turn of the twentieth century alongside East Asian responses—China embraced the designation while Japan resisted it. Tao praised Keevak's multilingual primary source research and contribution to understanding racial category formation, but noted the book's exclusive focus on Western academic traditions and suggested future scholarship could explore East Asian racial thinking, modern reinterpretations of these stereotypes in wartime propaganda and immigration contexts, and the social and legal dimensions of racial construction beyond academic discourse.

Björn Schmidt reviewed the book in German and praised the book for filling a crucial gap in scholarship on racial thinking. Schmidt said that while studies of "whiteness" and "blackness" had extensive research traditions, few works had specifically examined "yellowness." He used the example of a 2003 board game that unreflectively assigned yellow tokens to represent Asians to illustrate the contemporary relevance of the work. Schmidt appreciated the meticulous genealogy of how East Asians transitioned from being described as "white" in early European accounts to becoming fixed as a "yellow Mongolian race" by the 19th century, particularly valuing the analysis of scientific practices that attempted to quantify skin color through increasingly absurd instruments like the "Color Top. Schmidt concluded that the book provided important impulses for research in history of science, cultural history, and postcolonial studies, serving as a valuable foundation for future scholarship even as its theoretical gaps invited further development.

Alexandra Cook acknowledged the work's contribution to interrogating racialist thought in the Western tradition and its documentation of how East Asians transitioned from being classified as "white" to becoming the "yellow peril." Cook praised the book's "thorough examination of the nuances and usages of specific colour terms over time" and its use of diverse sources in multiple languages including Dutch, French, German, Italian, Latin, Portuguese and Spanish. However, she found the book "less satisfying in accounting for why these colour terms evolved the way they did," noting that it focused more on color labeling than on the theoretical underpinnings of racial classification. She also questioned the ultimate importance of color in the broader discourse about race.

Magnus Fiskesjö described the book as a "wonderful, even riveting" exploration that reveals a striking historical shift: Europeans initially described East Asians as "white" in pre-eighteenth century accounts, only later determining them to be "yellow" through emergent racial classification systems. Fiskesjö connected this history to anthropological insights about color symbolism, and noticed how Europeans interpreted light skin theologically (light representing good, dark representing evil) and initially hoped East Asians' lightness indicated potential Christian kinship—a hope dashed when conversion proved difficult. Fiskesjö explored how China embraced the yellow designation (connecting it to existing cultural symbolism like the Yellow Emperor) while Japan resisted being grouped with other Asians, and observed that many in Asia today uncritically accept these Western racial categories as fact. While praising Keevak's multilingual archival research, Fiskesjö pointed out to the book's exclusive focus on Western racial thinking and suggested future scholarship might examine East Asian racial concepts and the contemporary persistence of these constructed categories. He also recommended translation into Asian languages to help readers establish critical distance from their own supposed "yellowness.".

In his review for the Taipei Times, Bradley Winterton characterized the book as Keevak's "best to date" and described it as "a tightly-focused look at a narrowly-defined topic" examining representations from the 17th to 19th centuries. Winterton emphasized the author's argument that the racial categorization process was never neutral, noting Keevak's emphasis that yellow had negative connotations in the West and served to justify European domination. Winterton observed Keevak's distinctive use of extensive scare-quotes—counting 107 instances in a single chapter—which he interpreted as the author's way of distancing himself from the racist expressions encountered in historical sources. He welcomed the work's investigation into how East Asians transitioned from being considered white to being labeled as yellow when Europeans sought to differentiate colonized peoples from themselves.

Paul Spickard considered the book "smart, erudite, intriguing, quirky, delightful, and ultimately unsatisfying," finding fundamental flaws in its argumentative structure despite its impressive erudition. Spickard criticized Keevak's "curious manner of pursuing an argument," noting that each chapter proceeded in muddled, non-linear fashion, with key ideas introduced without context and narrative that "whirls around its subject, feinting here and there." Keevak provided extensive footnoted esoterica for minor points while making major assertions entirely unsupported—"as if Keevak is displaying all his minute and intricate learning early on, so that we will believe him later." Spickard compared each chapter to "John Soane's house on Lincoln Inn's Fields in London—overstuffed rooms of ephemera, all jumbled together," finding them individually interesting but lacking relationship to each other or a narrative arc. While acknowledging the work as an "impressionistic delight" for readers willing to adopt a passive "barnacle method," Spickard concluded that by book's end, neither reader nor author truly understood how or why Asians became yellow in European minds, nor its connection to the broader history of racial thinking initially promised—leaving readers entertained through "fascinating tours of hundreds of alleys and byways" but "not exactly enlightened."

In his review, Italian cultural historian Gabriele Proglio discussed how Keevak traced East Asians' acquisition of the racial designation "yellow" in Western thought. Proglio praised Keevak for exposing how European scientific disciplines constructed "yellow" as a mechanism of othering that reinforced white hegemony, revealing the power relations embedded in racial categorization rather than treating color as mere description.

Historian Walter Demel considered the work as "the first comprehensive study on European or 'Western' perceptions of Asians," but raised several methodological and scholarly concerns. Demel criticized the author for exaggerating the relevance of skin color in the pre-eighteenth century period and for providing "rather imprecise" historical descriptions. He praised the semantic analyses of Latin terms as the "main achievement of the book," but his most significant criticism concerned the book's treatment of previous scholarship.

== Awards ==
- 2013 Academia Sinica Scholarly Monograph Award in the Humanities and Social Sciences

== Translations ==
The book has been translated into Traditional Chinese, Simplified Chinese, Korean, and Turkish.

=== Chinese translations ===
==== Traditional Chinese ====
A Traditional Chinese translation was published in Taiwan in April 2015, under the title 成為黃種人：一部東亞人由白變黃的歷史 (Chéngwéi huángzhǒng rén: Yī bù dōngyà rén yóu bái biàn huáng de lìshǐ) by Ba Qi Culture (八旗文化). The book was translated by Wu Wei-Jiang (吳緯疆).

==== Simplified Chinese ====
A Simplified Chinese translation was published in mainland China in October 2016 under the title 成为黄种人：亚洲种族思维简史 (Chéngwéi huángzhǒng rén: Yàzhōu zhǒngzú sīwéi jiǎnshǐ) by Zhejiang People's Publishing House (浙江人民出版社), in Hangzhou. The book was translated by Fang Xiaotian (方笑天).

=== Korean ===
A Korean translation was published in June 2016 under the title 황인종의 탄생: 인종적 사유의 역사 (Hwang-injong-ui tansaeng: Injongjeok sayu-ui yeoksa) by Hyeonamsa (현암사). The book was translated by Lee Hyo-seok (이효석). The translator wrote a special preface for the Korean edition, questioning whether it was time to stop using the discriminatory term "yellow."

=== Turkish ===
A Turkish translation was published in September 2024 under the title Asyalılar Nasıl Sarardı? Irksal Düşüncenin Kısa Tarihi by Pinhan Yayıncılık, an academic publisher in Turkey. The book was translated by Gökçen İleri and edited by Ceren Sungur.

== Reprints and excerpts ==
A chapter from Becoming Yellow titled "Measuring Skin Color and The Color Top" is scheduled to be reprinted in an edited volume, Color Protocols: Technologies of Racial Encoding in Chromatic Media, edited by Carolyn L. Kane and Lida Zeitlin-Wu, and will be published by MIT Press in September 2025.
