= Xiao Sijin =

Chinese diplomat

Xiao Sijin (Chinese: 肖思晋) was a Chinese diplomat. He was the Ambassador to the People's Republic of China to Mozambique (1989–1993) and Angola (1995–1999).

Preceded by Zhang Baosheng	Ambassador of China to Mozambique; 1989–1993	Succeeded by
Preceded by Zhang Baosheng	Ambassador of China to Angola; 1995–1999	Succeeded by Jiang Yuande
