= Jiang Yuande =

Chinese diplomat

Jiang Yuande (Chinese: 蒋元德) was a Chinese diplomat. He was Ambassador of the People's Republic of China to Cape Verde (1996–1999), Angola (1999–2002) and Brazil (2002–2006).

Preceded by Chen Dehe	Ambassador of China to Cape Verde; 1996–1999	Succeeded by
Preceded by Xiao Sijin	Ambassador of China to Angola; 1999–2002	Succeeded by Zhang Beisan
Preceded by Wan Yongxiang	Ambassador of China to Brazil; 2002–2006	Succeeded by Chen Duqing
