= Zhang Bolun =

Chinese diplomat

Zhang Bolun (Chinese: 张伯伦) was a Chinese diplomat. He was Ambassador of the People's Republic of China to Angola (2008–2011).

Preceded by Zhang Beisan	Ambassador of China to Angola; 2008–2011	Succeeded by Gao Kexiang
