= Shanghai Review of Books =

Chinese online magazine

- Cover of the pilot issue, featured Yu Ying-shih, the Chinese American historian and Sinologist.
- Frequency: Weekly
- Founded: 2008
- Final issue: 2017 (print)
- Company: Oriental Morning Daily
- Country: China
- Based in: Shanghai

Shanghai Review of Books (Chinese: 上海书评) is a Chinese weekly paper-magazine supplement to Shanghai's Oriental Morning Daily (东方早报) with articles on literature, culture, history, art and current affairs, including book reviews, interviews and essays. It is published as an insert in each Sunday edition of the daily. It is one of the most influential literary-intellectual magazines in China. Most of its contributors are intellectuals such as writers or scholars. One special column of the Review would introduce a personal book room in Shanghai and its owner in every issue. The foundation of the Review is inspired by The New York Review of Books and London Review of Books in early 2008. The pilot issue of the Review was published in 25 May, and the formal first issue published in 6 July. The Review celebrated its 8th anniversary in 2016. The content of the Review also updates on news website The Paper (thepaper.cn). As the print version of Oriental Morning Daily has stopped publication since 2017, the Review has completely shifted to online edition.
