= Embassy of China, Belgrade =

Diplomatic mission of the People's Republic of China in Serbia

Embassy of China in Belgrade 中国驻塞尔维亚大使馆
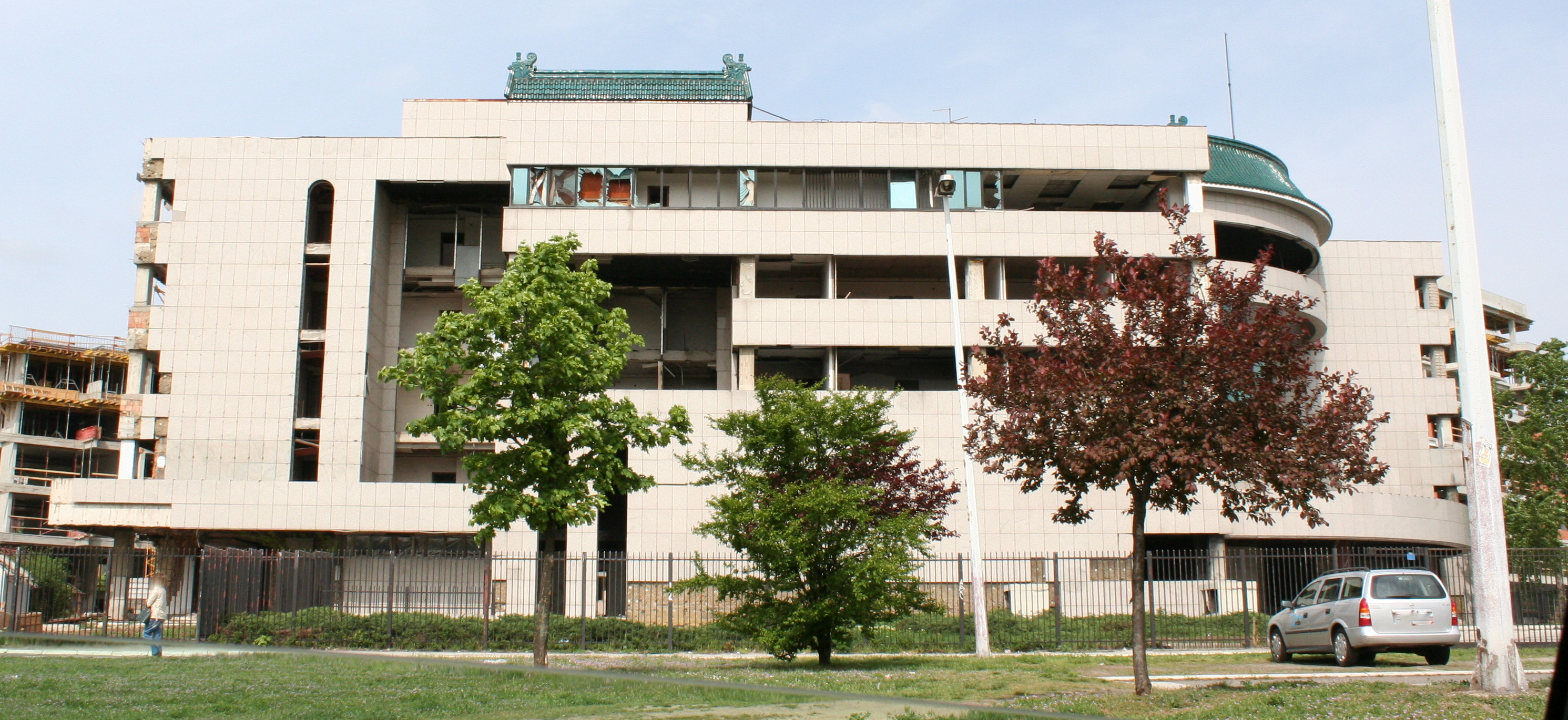
- Former embassy building in 2009, 10 years after its bombing
- Location: Belgrade, Serbia
- Address: 25 Užice Street
- Coordinates: 44°47′02″N 20°27′15″E
- Ambassador: Ming Li
- Website: rs.china-embassy.gov.cn/chn/

The Embassy of the People's Republic of China in Serbia (Chinese: 中华人民共和国驻塞尔维亚大使馆; Serbian: Амбасада НР Кине у Републици Србији) is the official diplomatic mission of People's Republic of China to the Serbia. The embassy was opened in 1955, and the current ambassador is Li Ming.

== History ==
=== Establishment of relations ===
The history of the Chinese embassy in Serbia can be traced back to the establishment of diplomatic relations between China and Yugoslavia in 1955, when embassies were established in Belgrade and Beijing, and both sides exchanged ambassadors. The Chinese side appointed Wu Xiuquan, the Deputy Foreign Minister at the time, to be the ambassador to Yugoslavia. On April 13, 1955, Qiuye Zhou, adviser for state affairs at the Embassy, came to Yugoslavia to prepare for the opening of the embassy. Then, on May 24, Wu Xiuquan arrived in Yugoslavia, and presented to Yugoslav president Josip Broz Tito his letter of credence two days later. At the site of the former embassy, there was originally a three-story residence of a high-ranking Yugoslav official, built in a Western style with three marble columns. The first Yugoslav ambassador to China Milentije Popović used to reside here.

=== Bombing ===
At 11:45 p.m. local time on May 7, 1999 (early dawn on May 8, Beijing time), a B-2 bomber that took off from the United States launched five JDAM bombs that directly hit the Chinese embassy building. Three Chinese journalists, Shao Yunhuan from Xinhua News Agency, along with Su Singhu and Zhu Yi from Guangming Daily, were killed on the spot. More than twenty employees were injured, and the embassy building was completely destroyed. After this accident, the Embassy rented premises in several different locations until further notice.

=== Recent period ===
In 2004, the Chinese government signed an agreement with the government of Serbia and Montenegro on the issue of the embassy premises. The Chinese side agreed to hand over the right of ownership to the site of the old embassy, and in return, Serbia and Montenegro would provide land for the construction of a new building free of charge. On May 7, 2008, the nine-year commemoration of the bombing, the new embassy organized the foundation stone–laying ceremony. On July 15, 2010, the building officially held an opening ceremony. Wu Bangguo, then president of the Chinese Standing Committee arrived at Serbia for this occasion, and cut the ribbon at the ceremony. At the end of 2010, Belgrade's city administration demolished the remains of the bombed embassy, and placed a commemorative plaque in that place. In 2017, the construction of the Chinese Cultural Center in Belgrade began.

=== Kosovo office ===
The Embassy operates the "Office in Pristina of the Embassy of the People's Republic of China in Serbia" in Pristina, Kosovo, established in December 2006. The office is mainly responsible for consular and liaison affairs related to Kosovo. As the government of the People's Republic of China does not recognize the independence of Kosovo and continues to regard it as part of Serbia, the office operates as a subordinate institution of the Embassy in Serbia.

== List of Ambassadors ==
Diplomatic accreditation	Ambassador	Chinese language 中国驻塞尔维亚大使列表	Observations	Premier of the People's Republic of China	President of Yugoslavia/ Serbia-Montenegro/ Serbia	Term end
Federal People's Republic of Yugoslavia
1955	Wu Xiuquan	伍修权		Zhou Enlai	Josip Broz Tito	1958
1958			Chargé d'affaires	Zhou Enlai	Josip Broz Tito	1970
Socialist Federal Republic of Yugoslavia
1970	Zeng Tao	曾涛		Zhou Enlai	Josip Broz Tito	1973
1973	Zhang Haifeng	张海峰		Zhou Enlai	Josip Broz Tito	1978
1978	Zhou Qiuye	周秋野		Hua Guofeng	Josip Broz Tito	1981
1981	Peng Guangwei	彭光伟		Zhao Ziyang	Sergej Kraigher	1983
1983	Xie Li	谢黎		Zhao Ziyang	Mika Špiljak	1986
1986	Tian Zengpei	田曾佩		Zhao Ziyang	Sinan Hasani	1988
1988	Ma Xusheng	马叙生		Li Peng	Raif Dizdarević	1991
1991	Zhang Dake	张大可		Li Peng	Borisav Jović	1993
Federal Republic of Yugoslavia
1992				Li Peng	Dobrica Ćosić	
1992	Zhu Ankang	朱安康		Li Peng	Dobrica Ćosić	1998
1997	Pan Zhanlin	潘占林	The embassy was bombed by the United States on May 7, 1999.	Li Peng	Slobodan Milošević	2000
2000	Wen Xigui	温西贵		Zhu Rongji	Vojislav Koštunica	2003
State Union of Serbia and Montenegro
2003	Li Guobang	李国邦		Wen Jiabao	Svetozar Marović	2006
Republic of Serbia
2006	Li Guobang	李国邦		Wen Jiabao	Boris Tadić	2008
2008	Wei Jinghua	魏敬华		Wen Jiabao	Boris Tadić	2011
2011	Zhang Wanxue	张万学		Wen Jiabao	Boris Tadić	2014
2014	Li Manchang	李满长		Li Keqiang	Tomislav Nikolić	2023
2023	Li Ming	李明		Li Qiang	Aleksandar Vučić	

== See also ==
- China-Serbia relations
- China-Yugoslavia relations
- Embassy of Serbia, Beijing
- List of diplomatic missions of China
- List of diplomatic missions in Serbia
