= List of ambassadors of China to Serbia =

Coordinates: 39.945383°N 116.460746°E

Chinese Ambassador to Serbia
- Incumbent; Li Ming since 2 October 2023
- Inaugural holder: Wu Xiuquan
- Formation: 26 February 1955

The Chinese ambassador to Serbia is the official representative of the People's Republic of China to the Republic of Serbia.

== List of representatives ==
Diplomatic accreditation	Ambassador	Chinese language 中国驻塞尔维亚大使列表	Observations	Premier of the People's Republic of China	President of Yugoslavia/ Serbia-Montenegro/ Serbia	Term end
Federal People's Republic of Yugoslavia
1955	Wu Xiuquan	伍修权		Zhou Enlai	Josip Broz Tito	1958
1958			Chargé d'affaires	Zhou Enlai	Josip Broz Tito	1970
Socialist Federal Republic of Yugoslavia
1970	Zeng Tao	曾涛		Zhou Enlai	Josip Broz Tito	1973
1973	Zhang Haifeng	张海峰		Zhou Enlai	Josip Broz Tito	1978
1978	Zhou Qiuye	周秋野		Hua Guofeng	Josip Broz Tito	1981
1981	Peng Guangwei	彭光伟		Zhao Ziyang	Sergej Kraigher	1983
1983	Xie Li	谢黎		Zhao Ziyang	Mika Špiljak	1986
1986	Tian Zengpei	田曾佩		Zhao Ziyang	Sinan Hasani	1988
1988	Ma Xusheng	马叙生		Li Peng	Raif Dizdarević	1991
1991	Zhang Dake	张大可		Li Peng	Borisav Jović	1993
Federal Republic of Yugoslavia
1992				Li Peng	Dobrica Ćosić	
1992	Zhu Ankang	朱安康		Li Peng	Dobrica Ćosić	1998
1997	Pan Zhanlin	潘占林	The embassy was bombed by the United States on May 7, 1999.	Li Peng	Slobodan Milošević	2000
2000	Wen Xigui	温西贵		Zhu Rongji	Vojislav Koštunica	2003
State Union of Serbia and Montenegro
2003	Li Guobang	李国邦		Wen Jiabao	Svetozar Marović	2006
Republic of Serbia
2006	Li Guobang	李国邦		Wen Jiabao	Boris Tadić	2008
2008	Wei Jinghua	魏敬华		Wen Jiabao	Boris Tadić	2011
2011	Zhang Wanxue	张万学		Wen Jiabao	Boris Tadić	2014
2014	Li Manchang	李满长		Li Keqiang	Tomislav Nikolić	2023
2023	Li Ming	李明		Li Qiang	Aleksandar Vučić	

== See also ==
- China–Serbia relations
- Foreign relations of China
