= Li Hejun (materials scientist) =

Chinese engineer

- Born: December 1957 (age 68); Queshan County, Henan, China
- Education: Henan University of Science and Technology; Harbin Institute of Technology
- Scientific career
- Fields: Composite material
- Workplaces: Northwestern Polytechnical University
- Doctoral advisor: Huo Wencan; Wang Zhongren

Chinese name
- Traditional Chinese: 李賀軍
- Simplified Chinese: 李贺军
Transcriptions
Standard Mandarin
- Hanyu Pinyin: Lǐ Hèjūn

Li Hejun (Chinese: 李贺军; born December 1957) is a Chinese engineer specializing in composite material. He an academician of the Chinese Academy of Engineering (CAE) and formerly served as dean of the School of Materials, Northwestern Polytechnical University. He is a member of the Chinese Materials Research Society (C-MRS), Chinese Society for Composite Materials (CSCM), and Chinese Society for Metals (CSM).

== Biography ==
Li was born in Queshan County, Henan, in December 1957. During the Down to the Countryside Movement, he was a sent-down youth in his hometown. After the resumption of National College Entrance Examination, he graduated from Luoyang Agricultural Machinery College (now Henan University of Science and Technology) in January 1982. He taught at Luoyang Engineering Institute (now Henan University of Science and Technology) between 1984 and 1988. He enrolled at the Harbin Institute of Technology where he received his master's degree in 1984 and his doctor's degree in 1991 under the supervision of Huo Wencan (霍文灿) and Wang Zhongren (王仲仁) both in plastic processing. In 1991 he carried out postdoctoral research at Northwestern Polytechnical University. In March 1994 he was haired as an associate professor the Northwestern Polytechnical University. He was dean of its School of Materials from 2002 to 2016.

== Honours and awards ==
- 2002 National Science Fund for Distinguished Young Scholars
- 2016 State Natural Science Award (Second Class)
- July 2019 Fellow of the Asia-Pacific Academy of Materials
- November 22, 2019 Member of the Chinese Academy of Engineering (CAE)
