= List of ambassadors of the Republic of China to the Solomon Islands =

Coordinates: 9.431193°S 159.993797°E

Ambassador of Republic of China to the Solomon Islands
- Inaugural holder: Ning Ji-kun
- Formation: December 21, 1985
- Final holder: Oliver Liao
- Abolished: September 16, 2019

The Taiwanese ambassador in Honiara was the official representative of the Government of the Republic of China (Taiwan) to the Government of Solomon Islands up to 2019. Subsequently, the Government of the Solomon Islands broke off diplomatic relations with Taiwan and established new relations with the People's Republic of China.

== List of representatives ==
Diplomatic agrément/Diplomatic accreditation	ambassador	Chinese language zh:中国驻所罗门群岛大使列表	Observations	List of premiers of the Republic of China	Prime Minister of the Solomon Islands	Term end
March 24, 1983			The governments of Honiara and Taipei establish consular relations.	Sun Yun-suan	Solomon Mamaloni	
April 24, 1983			Establishment of the Consulate General in Honiara.	Sun Yun-suan	Solomon Mamaloni	
July 1983	Sun Xizhong	孫希中	cónsul general	Sun Yun-suan	Solomon Mamaloni	October 1984
October 1984	Wang Zhaoxuan	王昭宣	cónsul general	Yu Kuo-hwa	Solomon Mamaloni	September 1985
September 16, 1985			The Republic of China and the Solomon Islands upgraded their diplomatic relations to the ambassadorial level.	Yu Kuo-hwa	Peter Kenilorea	
December 1985	Ning Ji-kun	甯紀坤		Yu Kuo-hwa	Peter Kenilorea	September 1990
September 1990	Shih-Cheng Chang	張士丞	with concurrent acretidion in Nauru.	Hau Pei-tsun	Solomon Mamaloni	December 1991
December 1991	William Hsing-chung Chao	趙興中	with concurrent acretidion in Nauru.	Hau Pei-tsun	Solomon Mamaloni	February 1996
February 1996	Thomas Hsieh	謝棟樑	On August 31, 1998, the Republic of China (ROC: Taiwan) appointed a new Ambassador to the Solomon Islands. Ambassador Teng Pei- Yin arrived in Honiara on September 7, 2000. He replaced former ambassador Thomas Hsieh who was recalled because of alleged involvement in Solomon Islands' political affairs.	Lien Chan	Solomon Mamaloni	August 1998
August 1998	Teng Pei-Yin	鄧備殷		Vincent Siew	Bartholomew Ulufa'alu	July 2003
July 2003	Antonio Chen	陈俊贤		Yu Shyi-kun	Allan Kemakeza	September 2006
September 2006	Laurie Chan	詹秀穎	George Chan	Su Tseng-chang	Manasseh Sogavare	February 2011
February 2011	Wu Yuan-Yen	烏元彥	Roy Wu	Wu Den-yih	Danny Philip	January 2014
January 2014	Victor Te-Sun Yu	于德勝	From 2011 to 2012 he was Taipei Representative Office in Norway"Jane Chen" Taiwan Norway	Jiang Yi-huah	Gordon Darcy Lilo	September 9, 2015
September 9, 2015	Luo Tianhong	羅添宏		Mao Chi-kuo	Manasseh Sogavare	June 2019
August 21, 2019	Oliver Liao	廖文哲		Su Tseng-chang	Manasseh Sogavare	September 16, 2019

== See also ==
- List of ambassadors of China to the Solomon Islands
