= China–North Macedonia relations =

- China: North Macedonia

Diplomatic mission
- Embassy of China, Skopje: Embassy of North Macedonia, Beijing

The People's Republic of China and the Republic of North Macedonia maintain bilateral relations.

The People's Republic of China and North Macedonia established diplomatic relations in 1993. However, in 1999, North Macedonia established diplomatic relations with the Republic of China, leading to the severance of diplomatic ties between the People's Republic of China and North Macedonia. Relations were not resumed until 2001. Since then, relations between the two countries have developed smoothly, with close exchanges in the economy, trade, and culture.

== History ==
=== 1990s to 2000s ===
North Macedonia was formerly part of the Socialist Federal Republic of Yugoslavia, but declared independence on November 20, 1991. On April 7, 1993, the United Nations General Assembly passed a resolution accepting North Macedonia as a member of the United Nations under the temporary name of "Former Yugoslav Republic of Macedonia"; the People's Republic of China co-sponsored and voted in favor of the resolution.

On September 29, 1993, Chinese Foreign Minister Qian Qichen attended the United Nations General Assembly and met with Kiro Gligorov, then President of the Republic of Macedonia. Qian stated that the People's Republic of China recognized the Republic of Macedonia as an independent sovereign state and was willing to develop bilateral relations with it. Gligorov also expressed his willingness to continue political and economic exchanges with China. On October 21 of the same year, Li Zhaoxing, China's Ambassador to the United Nations, and Denko Maleski, Republic of Macedonia's Ambassador to the United Nations, signed a joint communiqué in New York, United States, formally establishing relations between the two countries. In the communiqué, the country was referred to as the "Republic of Macedonia", which drew strong opposition from Greece.

The Republic of China (Taiwan) began sending personnel to the Republic of Macedonia in 1997 to engage with opposition parties, including the VMRO-DPMNE and the Democratic Choice Party, which performed well in the late 1998 parliamentary elections. Following the elections, the roles of president and prime minister were held by individuals from different and rival political parties, although the president retained significant power. Reports indicated that the Republic of China promised the Republic of Macedonia US$300 million in cash and the construction of an industrial park. On January 27, 1999, the Republic of China established diplomatic relations with the Republic of Macedonia. However, this decision was reportedly handled by the Prime Minister and the Minister of Foreign Affairs without President Gligorov's knowledge; he later refused to accept the credentials presented by the Republic of China's ambassador. Vasil Tupurkovski, a candidate in the 1999 Republic of Macedonia presidential election, stated that the Republic of Macedonia did not intend to cause trouble for the People's Republic of China and hoped for understanding. He also believed that establishing diplomatic relations with the Republic of China could bring new opportunities to the Balkan Peninsula.

Although the Republic of Macedonia did not propose to sever ties with the People's Republic of China, the latter does not permit its diplomatic allies to simultaneously recognize the Republic of China. Consequently, the People's Republic of China severed diplomatic relations with the Republic of Macedonia on February 9, 1999. Following the Republic of Macedonia's establishment of relations with the Republic of China, the People's Republic of China exercised its veto power in the UN Security Council on February 25, 1999, blocking the extension of the UN peacekeeping force's mission in the Republic of Macedonia.

In May 2001, changes occurred in the government of the Republic of Macedonia. The newly appointed Deputy Prime Minister, Foreign Minister, and Defense Minister were reportedly not in favor of continuing diplomatic relations with the Republic of China. To maintain relations, the Republic of China's Foreign Minister Tien Hung-mao visited the Republic of Macedonia in June of the same year, but Foreign Minister Ilinka Mitreva refused to meet him. Taiwanese public opinion also generally disagreed with using money diplomacy to retain North Macedonia. Mitreva stated at a press conference that the Ministry of Foreign Affairs of the Republic of Macedonia planned to sever diplomatic relations with the Republic of China and normalize relations with the People's Republic of China.

On June 12, a spokesman for the government of the Republic of Macedonia announced the government's decision to recognize the People's Republic of China and restore normal diplomatic relations. On the morning of June 18, the spokesperson for the Ministry of Foreign Affairs of the Republic of China, Zhang Xiaoyue, officially announced the severance of diplomatic relations. The statement read, "The government of the Republic of China deeply regrets that the Macedonian government has disregarded the friendship between the two countries and succumbed to the threats and inducements of Beijing." Analysts believed the government the Republic of Macedonia's move was intended to facilitate integration into the European Union, where all member states recognize the People's Republic of China, and also because economic and trade cooperation with the Republic of China had not been particularly effective.

=== 2010s to present ===
In November 2011, the People's Republic of China provided 23 school buses to the Republic of Macedonia as aid. This action sparked controversy in China due to a 2011 school bus accident in Gansu and the fact that the Republic of Macedonia's per capita GDP (US$5,098) was comparable to China's (US$5,614) that year. Some argued that Chinese authorities should prioritize improving the school bus situation within China.

North Macedonia joined the Belt and Road Initiative in 2013.

== Cultural relations ==
The National and University Library of North Macedonia houses a "Chinese Culture House," funded by the Embassy of China in North Macedonia. It provides books, newspapers, magazines, and CDs about China and hosts activities promoting Chinese culture. Additionally, the University of Saints Cyril and Methodius in North Macedonia and Southwestern University of Finance and Economics in Mainland China jointly operate a Confucius Institute. Established in September 2013, this institute offers Chinese language courses and holds cultural events.

The "Selected Works of Macedonian Literature in Chinese Translation," compiled by Henan University of Science and Technology and four sinologists from the Republic of Macedonia, was published in December 2014. This was the first joint translation of literary of the Republic of Macedonia works into Chinese by scholars from mainland China and North Macedonia. In February 2015, sinologist Igor Rajev released his translation of "Selected Works of Ancient Chinese Poetry," which includes over 300 Chinese poems from the "Book of Songs" to the end of the Qing dynasty. Rajev had previously translated Chinese classics such as "The Analects of Confucius"," "The Great Learning," "The Doctrine of the Mean," and "Tao Te Ching" into Macedonian. The "Chinese-Macedonian Small Dictionary," compiled by Chinese teachers from mainland China and North Macedonia, was published in May 2015. This dictionary introduces the pronunciation, form, and meaning of common Chinese characters according to modern standard Chinese, serving as a resource for Macedonian beginners. Some Chinese universities, such as Beijing Foreign Studies University, also offer courses in Macedonian.

In mid-2014, Prime Minister Nikola Gruevski visited Guangzhou and Hong Kong. In Hong Kong, he met with Chief Executive Leung Chun-ying to discuss cooperation. Gruevski also visited Queen Mary Hospital, and the two sides agreed that the hospital would provide training for doctors from North Macedonia. In February 2015, a delegation from Nanchang City visited Skopje, North Macedonia, for a cultural event featuring performances such as dance, erhu music, chorus, Tai Chi, and embroidery.

In November 2024, the People's Republic of China announced it would unilaterally grant visa-free entry to citizens of North Macedonia holding a North Macedonian passport for stays in Mainland China not exceeding 30 days, effective until December 31, 2025. Citizens can also enter Hong Kong visa-free for 14 days and Macau visa-free for 90 days.

== Resident diplomatic missions ==
- China has an embassy in Skopje.
- North Macedonia has an embassy in Beijing.

== See also ==
- Foreign relations of China
- Foreign relations of North Macedonia
- China–Yugoslavia relations
