= Nebojša Koharović =

Croatian diplomat (born 1963)

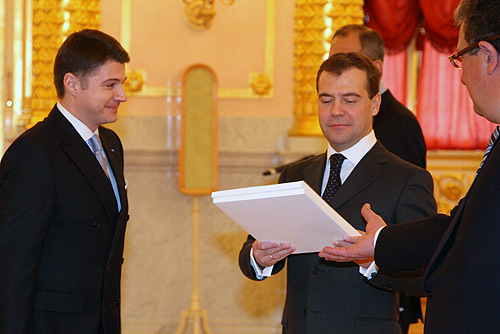
Nebojša Koharović (left) presents his Letter of Credence to President of Russia Dmitry Medvedev on 27 February 2009.

Nebojša Koharović (born 17 May 1963 in Zagreb) is a Croatian diplomat and the current Ambassador to Indonesia.

He served as an Ambassador Extraordinary and Plenipotentiary of the Republic of Croatia to the Republic of Poland, and later to the Russian Federation, presenting his Letter of Credence to President of Russia Dmitry Medvedev on 27 February 2009.

He was previously Assistant Minister of Foreign Affairs of Croatia, and in that role played a part in a series of bilateral visits on China–Croatia relations in 2002.
