= Cai Weiming =

Chinese politician

- 蔡蔚鸣

Chinese Ambassador to the Solomon Islands
- Incumbent
- Assumed office 13 December 2023
- Preceded by: Li Ming

Personal details
- Born: November 1971 (age 54) China

Cai Weiming (Chinese: 蔡蔚鸣; born November 1972), is a Chinese politician who is currently serving as the Chinese Ambassador to the Solomon Islands since 13 December 2023.

== Biography ==
Cai Weiming was born in November 1972.

He has served as counselor, chief clerk and counselor of the West Asia and North Africa Department of the Chinese Ministry of Foreign Affairs at the Chinese embassy in Israel.

In 2021, he was appointed as deputy director of the West Asia and North Africa Department of the Ministry of Foreign Affairs.

In December 2023, he was appointed Ambassador of China to the Solomon Islands.
