= China–Croatia relations =

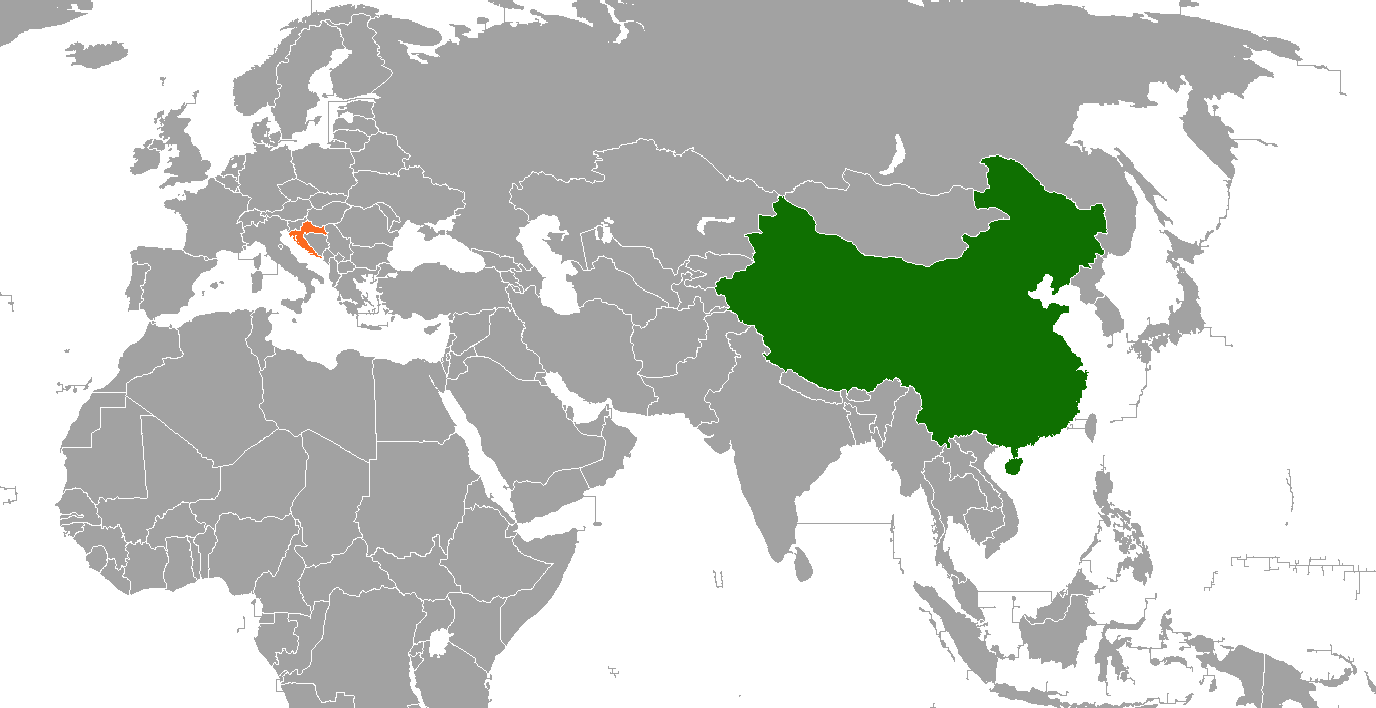

- China: Croatia

China and Croatia established diplomatic relations on May 13, 1992. In 2005, the two countries agreed to a comprehensive and cooperative partnership. Croatia has an embassy in Beijing and a general consulate in Hong Kong. China has an embassy and a Confucius Institute in Zagreb.

== History ==
Croatian President Stjepan Mesić made a state visit to China on May 16, 2002, while Chinese president Hu Jintao made a state visit to Croatia on June 19, 2009.

In 2005, the two countries agreed to a comprehensive and cooperative partnership.

On May 21, 2007, Croatian Foreign Minister Kolinda Grabar-Kitarović visited Beijing.

== Economic relations ==
The People's Republic of China is with Japan the most important Croatian trading partner in East Asia. The volume of trade between the two countries in 2013 was US$1.495 billion with Croatian exports taking US$105 million, and Chinese US$1.390 billion.

Croatia joined the Belt and Road Initiative (BRI) in 2017.

== Culture and education ==
Educational and cultural cooperation between the two countries is being maintained under the Agreement on cultural cooperation that was concluded in March 1993.

University of Zagreb offers major in Sinology since October 2004, while Beijing Foreign Studies University offers a major in Croatian.

The Confucius Institute in Zagreb was opened in May 2012.

In May 2013, China and Croatia signed "Plan for Cooperation in Education for the Period of 2013-2016", providing yearly scholarships to Chinese and Croatian students.

== See also ==
- Foreign relations of China
- Foreign relations of Croatia
- China–EU relations
- China–Yugoslavia relations
- China–Serbia relations
