= List of ambassadors of the Republic of China to Tuvalu =

Coordinates: 8.521159°S 179.196169°E

Taiwanese Ambassador to Tuvalu
- Inaugural holder: Gao Zheng
- Formation: September 1979; 47 years ago

The Taiwanese Ambassador to Tuvalu is the official representative of the Republic of China to Tuvalu.

== List of representatives ==
Start date	Ambassador	Chinese language zh:中華民國駐吐瓦魯大使列表	Notes	Premier of the Republic of China	Prime Minister of Tuvalu	End date
September 19, 1979			The governments in Funafuti and Taipei established diplomatic relations.	Sun Yun-suan	Toaripi Lauti	
September 1979	Gao Zheng	zh:高铮	Taiwan's chargé d'affaires in Tonga in 1975, promoted to ambassador to Tonga in 1978.	Sun Yun-suan	Toaripi Lauti	February 1, 1981
February 1, 1981	Clément A.K. Tsien	钱爱虔	The Republic of China has not set up an embassy in Tuvalu since it established diplomatic relations with the country in 1979. The ambassador to Tonga, Clement A.K. Tsien, also served as ambassador to Tuvalu.	Sun Yun-suan	Toaripi Lauti	December 1, 1989
July 1, 1989	Ouyang Huang	欧阳璜	Ambassador in Tonga.	Lee Huan	Tomasi Puapua	February 1, 1996
February 1, 1996	TU, Chi-kwang	屠继光	Ambassador in Tonga.	Lien Chan	Kamuta Latasi	November 1, 1999
March 1, 1999	Teng Pei-Yin	鄧備殷	Concurrently accredited ambassador to Nauru from 1999 to 2003, as well as ambassador to the Solomon Islands from 1998 to 2003.	Vincent Siew	Bikenibeu Paeniu	July 1, 2003
July 1, 2003	Antonio Chen	陈俊贤	Also ambassador to the Solomon Islands from July 2003 to September 2006.	Yu Shyi-kun	Saufatu Sopoanga	March 1, 2004
March 1, 2004	Feng Tai	酆邰	In late August 2006, following Tuvalu's general election, Ambassador Tai Feng was expelled for meddling in the process of forming the new government through offering bribes.	Yu Shyi-kun	Saufatu Sopoanga	October 1, 2006
October 1, 2006	Daniel Liao	廖東周	Liao Tung-chou	Su Tseng-chang	Apisai Ielemia	October 1, 2008
November 1, 2008	James Tien	田中光		Liu Chao-shiuan	Apisai Ielemia	September 1, 2010
September 1, 2010	Larry Tseng	曾瑞利		Wu Den-yih	Apisai Ielemia	June 1, 2013
June 1, 2013	Ming Chang	張明	Zhang Ming	Jiang Yi-huah	Willy Telavi	April 1, 2014
April 1, 2014	Jason C. H. WAN	萬家興		Jiang Yi-huah	Enele Sopoaga	January 1, 2016
January 1, 2016	Marc, Jen-Chung U	蘇仁崇		Mao Chi-kuo	Enele Sopoaga, Kausea Natano	January 2016
