= Tian Zengpei =

Chinese diplomat and politician (1930–2024)

- 田曾佩

Chairperson of the Foreign Affairs Committee of the Chinese People's Political Consultative Conference
- In office March 1998 – March 2003
- Preceded by: Qian Liren
- Succeeded by: Liu Jianfeng

Chinese Ambassador to Yugoslavia
- In office June 1986 – April 1988
- President: Li Xiannian
- Preceded by: Xie Li
- Succeeded by: Ma Xusheng

Chinese Ambassador to Czechoslovakia
- In office April 1984 – March 1985
- President: Li Xiannian
- Preceded by: Li Tingquan
- Succeeded by: Zhang Dake

Personal details
- Born: 8 October 1930 Raoyang County, Hebei, China
- Died: 10 January 2024 (aged 93)
- Party: Chinese Communist Party
- Education: Nankai University

Tian Zengpei (Chinese: 田曾佩; pinyin: Tián Zēngpèi; 8 October 1930 – 10 January 2024) was a Chinese diplomat and politician who served as Chinese Ambassador to Czechoslovakia from 1984 to 1985, Chinese Ambassador to Yugoslavia from 1986 to 1988, and chairperson of the Foreign Affairs Committee of the Chinese People's Political Consultative Conference from 1998 to 2003.

Tian was a member of the 14th Central Committee of the Chinese Communist Party.

== Biography ==
Tian was born in Raoyang County, Hebei, on 8 October 1930. He attended Tianjin No. 1 High School. He graduated from the Department of Foreign Languages, Nankai University. He joined the Chinese Communist Party (CCP) in November 1947. He was sent abroad to study at the Central Youth League School of the Communist Youth League of the Soviet Union 1951 and returned to China in 1952. He worked at the Organization Department of the CCP Central Committee from 1954 to 1958.

Tian joined the Foreign Service in 1970 and has served primarily in the Eastern Europe Division. He was counsellor of the Chinese Embassy in the Soviet Union in 1976, in addition to serving as counsellor of the Chinese Embassy in Yugoslavia. He served as the Chinese Ambassador to Czechoslovakia from April 1984 through March 1985. He was director of the Eastern Europe Division of the Ministry of Foreign Affairs in 1985, and held that office until 1986. He served as the Chinese Ambassador to Yugoslavia from June 1986 until April 1988, when he was succeeded by Ma Xusheng. In April 1988, he became vice minister of foreign affairs, a post he kept until March 1998. He also served as a member of the Drafting Committee of the Basic Law of the Macao Special Administrative Region since June 1990. He took office as chairperson of the Foreign Affairs Committee of the Chinese People's Political Consultative Conference in March 1998, serving in the post until his retirement in March 2003.

Tian died on 10 January 2024, at the age of 93.

Diplomatic posts
| Preceded by Li Tingquan | Chinese Ambassador to Czechoslovakia; 1984–1985 | Succeeded by Zhang Dake |
| Preceded by Xie Li (谢黎) | Chinese Ambassador to Yugoslavia; 1986–1988 | Succeeded by Ma Xusheng |
Assembly seats
| Preceded by Qian Liren | Chairperson of the Foreign Affairs Committee of the Chinese People's Political Consultative Conference; 1998–2003 | Succeeded by Liu Jianfeng |
