= China–Serbia relations =

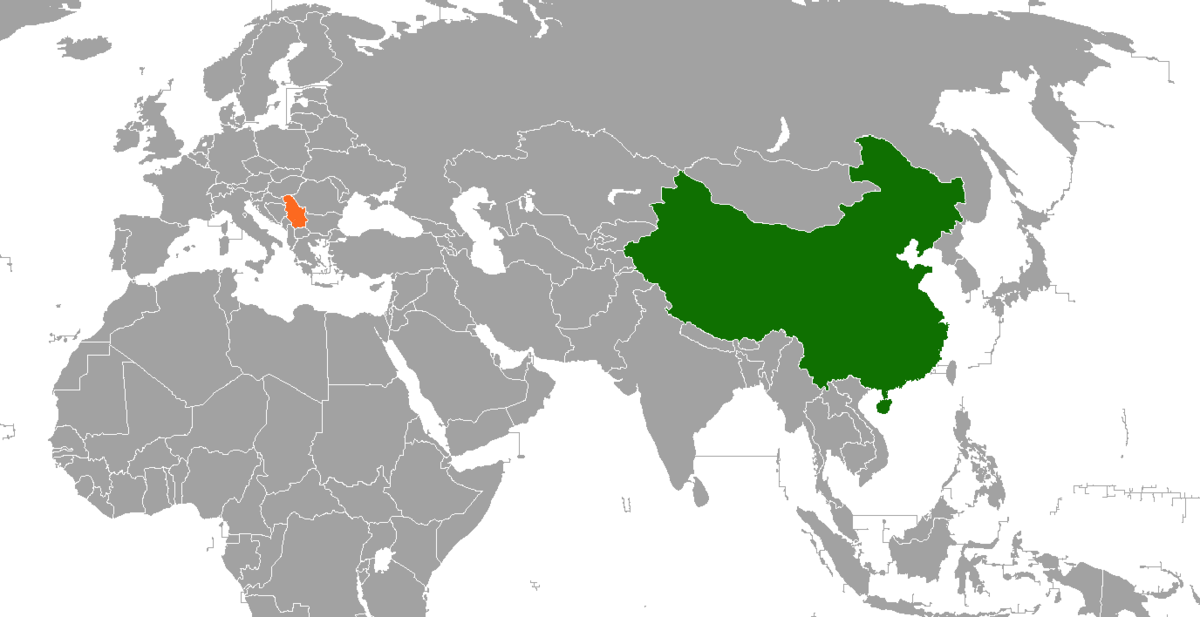
- China: Serbia

Diplomatic mission
- Embassy of China, Belgrade: Embassy of Serbia, Beijing

Envoy
- Li Ming: Maja Stefanović

China and Serbia maintain diplomatic relations established between People's Republic of China and SFR Yugoslavia in 1955. From 1956 to 2006, China maintained relations with the Socialist Federal Republic of Yugoslavia (SFRY) and the Federal Republic of Yugoslavia (FRY) (later Serbia and Montenegro), of which Serbia is considered shared (SFRY) or sole (FRY) legal successor. The two countries have had a strategic partnership since 2009 and relations became closer under Aleksandar Vučić.

== History ==
China supported the Serbia (then part of Federal Republic of Yugoslavia) during the Kosovo War and opposed the NATO airstrikes against targets in Serbia and Montenegro. China believed that Milošević was acting to prevent the secession of Kosovo by Albanian separatists from Serbia, and thus supported his actions as preserving the FRY's territorial integrity. China opposed NATO intervention in Kosovo on the basis that it set a dangerous precedent that Chinese officials believed could in the future afflict China should riots occur in Tibet or Xinjiang and then result in bombings. PRC opposition to the NATO actions intensified after the United States bombed the Chinese embassy in Belgrade during the war.

== Political relations ==
Serbia follows the one China principle, and recognizes government of the People's Republic of China as the sole legal government representing the whole of China and Taiwan as "an inalienable part" of China. Serbia also supports all efforts by the PRC to "achieve national reunification" and opposes Taiwan independence.

In 2009, China and Serbia agreed to cooperation on various forms of technological, economic, and infrastructure development.

Under president Aleksandar Vučić, Serbia has sought closer cooperation with China. After meeting with Chinese Minister of Foreign Affairs Wang Yi, he secured Chinese help in combating the COVID-19 pandemic in Serbia through the delivery of PPE and CoronaVac vaccine doses, which contributed to Serbia leading COVID-19 vaccination rates in Europe.

In 2019, UN ambassadors of 37 countries, including Serbia, signed a joint letter to the United Nations Human Rights Council defending China's persecution of Uyghurs. Serbia was one of 16 countries that defended China in 2019 but did not do so in 2020.

In 2024, on occasion of the 25th anniversary of the United States bombing of the Chinese embassy in Belgrade, Chinese leader Xi Jinping wrote an article in the Serbian newspaper Politika in which he stated, "The friendship between China and Serbia which is soaked in blood that the two peoples spilled together has become a joint memory of the two peoples and will encourage both parties to make together huge steps forward." Also in May 2024, Xi visited Serbia.

In September 2025, China ratified an extradition treaty it signed with Serbia in 2024.

=== China's stance on Kosovo ===
Serbia (yellow) and Kosovo (striped)

China backs Serbia's position regarding Kosovo. The Ministry of Foreign Affairs of China has made a statement stressing that the PRC "expresses grave concern" over Kosovo's unilateral declaration of independence. The spokesman Liu Jianchao's remarks go on to add that "The resolution of the Kosovo issue bares [sic] on peace and stability of the Balkan region, the fundamental norms governing international relations as well as the authority and role of the UN Security Council. China always believes that a plan acceptable to both Serbia and Kosovo through negotiations is the best way to resolve this issue. The unilateral move taken by Kosovo will lead to a series of consequences. China is deeply worried about its severe and negative impact on peace and stability of the Balkan region and the goal of establishing a multi-ethnic society in Kosovo. China calls upon Serbia and Kosovo to continue negotiations for a proper resolution within the framework of the international law and work together to safeguard peace and stability of the Balkan region. The international community should create favorable conditions for that."

Serbian Deputy Prime Minister Božidar Đelić told reporters after an April 2009 meeting in Beijing with Politburo member Liu Yandong that China reiterated its support to help Serbia preserve her territorial integrity. "Just as Serbia supports the one China policy, China supports Serbia as its best and most stable friend in southeastern Europe." Ambassador of China to Serbia, Wei Jinghua, stated in 2009 that "China respects the sovereignty and territorial integrity of Serbia and understands the great concern of Serbia on the issue of Kosovo. We support the negotiations between Belgrade and Pristina that would bring a mutually acceptable solution, in accordance with international law, the UN Charter and UN resolutions."

=== High-level visits ===
Dates	Visit
November 2000	Visit by Foreign Minister Živadin Jovanović, to Beijing
December 2000	Visit by Foreign Minister Tang Jiaxuan, to Belgrade
August 2001	Visit by Deputy Prime Minister Miroljub Labus, to Beijing
January 2002	Visit by President Vojislav Koštunica, to Beijing
April 2003	Visit by Foreign Minister Goran Svilanović, to Beijing
April 2003	Visit by Deputy Foreign Minister Liu Guchang, to Belgrade
November 2003	Visit by Prime Minister Zoran Živković, to Beijing
September 2004	Visit by Defence Minister Prvoslav Davinić, to Beijing
October 2004	Visit by CPPCC Vice Chair Liu Yandong, to Belgrade
February 2005	Visit by President Boris Tadić, to Beijing
May 2005	Visit by Deputy Foreign Minister Zhang Yesui, to Belgrade
May 2005	Visit by First Secretary of the CP City Committee Liu Qi, to Belgrade
May 2005	Visit by Foreign Minister Li Zhaoxing, to Belgrade
October 2005	Visit by Foreign Minister Vuk Drašković, to Beijing
December 2005	Visit by Minister for Human and Minority Rights Rasim Ljajić, to Beijing
May 2006	Visit by Mayor of Belgrade Nenad Bogdanović, to Beijing
May 2006	Visit by Director of the Security Intelligence Agency Director Rade Bulatović, to Beijing
August 2006	Visit by State Counsellor Tang Jiaxuan, to Belgrade
April 2007	Visit by Vice-Premier Hui Liangyu, to Belgrade
April 2007	Visit by Chief of General Staff of the Serbian Armed Forces Gen. Zdravko Ponoš, to Beijing
September 2007	Visit by Foreign Minister Vuk Jeremić, to Beijing
August 2008	Visit by President Boris Tadić, to Beijing
September 2008	Visit by Chief of the Joint Staff Department of the People Liberation Army Gen. Chen Bingde, to Belgrade
November 2008	Visit by Defence Minister Dragan Šutanovac, to Beijing
April 2009	Visit by Deputy Prime Minister Božidar Đelić, to Beijing
August 2009	Visit by President Boris Tadić, to Beijing
June 2010	Visit by Prime Minister Mirko Cvetković, to Beijing
July 2010	Visit by Chairman of the Standing Committee of the National People's Congress Wu Bangguo, to Belgrade
December 2010	Visit by Minister of Diaspora Srđan Srećković, to Beijing
May 2011	Visit by Foreign Minister Yang Jiechi, to Belgrade
August 2011	Visit by President of the National Assembly Slavica Đukić Dejanović, to Beijing
August 2013	Visit by President Tomislav Nikolić to Beijing, Hangzhou and Shanghai
December 2014	Visit by Premier Li Keqiang, to Belgrade
September 2015	Visit by President Tomislav Nikolić, to Beijing
November 2015	Visit by Prime Minister Aleksandar Vučić, to Suzhou
June 2016	Visit by CCP General Secretary & President Xi Jinping, to Belgrade and Smederevo
September 2018	Visit by President Aleksandar Vučić, to Tianjin
October 2023	Visit by President Aleksandar Vučić, to Beijing
May 2024	Visit by CCP General Secretary & President Xi Jinping, to Belgrade
May 2026	Visit by President Aleksandar Vučić, to Beijing

== Economic relations ==
China is Serbia's second biggest trading partner. Trade between the two countries amounted to $6.1 billion in 2022 with Chinese merchandise exports to Serbia standing at almost $5 billion while Serbian exports stood at $1.1 billion. Since 2024, China and Serbia have a free trade agreement.

Chinese companies invested $5.6 billion in Serbia in the last decade and employ 38,000 people. Chinese corporations making investments in Serbia include Zijin Mining (owner of Serbia Zijin Bor Copper cooper mining complex in Bor), Hesteel (owner of Hesteel Serbia steel plant in Smederevo), Hisense (electrical appliances factory in Valjevo), Linglong Tire (tire factory in Zrenjanin), and Minth (automotive parts factories in Šabac and Loznica).

Since early 2010s China has invested US$10 billion in Serbian infrastructure and energy mainly through China's Belt and Road Initiative, of which Serbia was one of major beneficiaries. Serbia had joined joined the BRI in 2015. BRI-funded projects including Serbian section of the Budapest–Belgrade railway (built by China Communications Construction Company and China Railway International), 350 MW B3 unit of Kostolac thermal power-plant (built by CMEC), Belgrade–Ljig and Čačak-Požega segments of A2 motorway (built by Shandong Gaosu Group), Pupin Bridge in Belgrade (built by CRBC).

The Serbian flag carrier Air Serbia operates flights between Belgrade and Shanghai. The Chinese carriers China Southern Airlines and Hainan Airlines operate flights between Belgrade and Guangzhou and Belgrade and Beijing, respectively.

In 2021, China became the largest single country investor in Serbia.

== Military cooperation ==
In recent years, Serbia has purchased from China air defense missile systems of medium and short range (HQ-22 and HQ-17) as well as combat drones (CH-95 and CH-92). In 2025, the Serbian and Chinese militaries conducted joint training exercises in China, an operation which was code-named "Peace Guardian 2025".

== Cultural cooperation ==
A Confucius Institute has been operating in Belgrade since 2006.

== Immigration from China ==
Estimates are that up to 15,000 Chinese people live in Serbia, mainly in Belgrade, Bor, and Zrenjanin. The first wave of Chinese immigration to Serbia mainly occurred during the late 1990s and was driven by relaxed visa policies, primarily traders from Zhejiang and Fujian who settled in Belgrade. A second wave was largely tied to economic activities, investments of Chinese companies in mining and manufacturing, and is concentrated in towns of Bor and Zrenjanin.

== Travel regime ==
In 2017, Serbia and China mutually abolished the requirement of obtaining an entry visa for its citizens.

== Resident diplomatic missions ==
- China has an embassy in Belgrade.
- Serbia has an embassy in Beijing and a consulate general in Shanghai.

== See also ==
- Foreign relations of China
- Foreign relations of Serbia
- China–Yugoslavia relations
