= Teng Pei-Yin =

Taiwanese diplomat

- 鄧 備殷
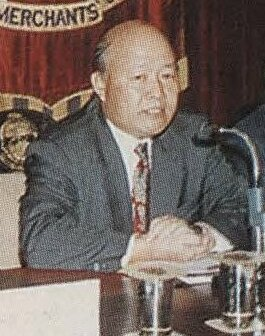

Chinese Ambassador to the Solomon Islands of Taiwan to Solomon Islands
- In office August 1998 – July 2003
- Preceded by: Thomas Hsieh
- Succeeded by: Antonio Chen

Personal details
- Born: January 9, 1943 (age 83)
- Spouse: Gi Ynn-erl
- Children: one daughter, one son.
- Education: 1965: Bachelor of Arts, National Chengchi University 1969: Master of Arts.

Teng Pei-Yin (born January 9, 1943) is a retired Taiwanese Ambassador.

- From 1972 till 1973 he was Junior Clerk at the Ministry of Foreign Affairs (Taiwan) in Taipei.
- From 1973 till 1990 he was Secretary and Director of the Office of the Ministry of Foreign Affairs (Taiwan) in Hong Kong.
- From 1991 till 1992 he was Deputy Director of the Bureau of Consular Affairs in the Ministry of Foreign Affairs (Taiwan).
- From 1995 to 1998 he was head of the Taipei Economic and Cultural Representative Office in New Delhi.
- From August 1998 to July 2003 he was ambassador in Honiara.
- Starting in 1999 he was concurrently accredited in Nauru and Tuvalu.
