= Committee of Foreign Affairs =

Special Committee of the CPPCC National Committee

- 中国人民政治协商会议全国委员会 外事委员会
- Formation: June 9, 1988; 38 years ago
- Type: Special committee of the CPPCC
- Location: Beijing
- Chairperson: He Ping
- Parent organization: National Committee of the Chinese People's Political Consultative Conference

Chinese name
- Simplified Chinese: 中国人民政治协商会议全国委员会外事委员会
- Traditional Chinese: 中國人民政治協商會議全國委員會外事委員會
Transcriptions
Standard Mandarin
- Hanyu Pinyin: Zhōngguó Rénmín Zhèngzhì Xiéshāng Huìyì Quánguó Wěiyuánhuì Wàishì Wěiyuánhuì

Shortest form
- Simplified Chinese: 全国政协外事委员会
- Traditional Chinese: 全國政協外事委員會
Transcriptions
Standard Mandarin
- Hanyu Pinyin: Quánguó Zhèngxié Wàishì Wěiyuánhuì

The Committee of Foreign Affairs is one of ten special committees of the National Committee of the Chinese People's Political Consultative Conference, China's top political advisory body and a central part of the Chinese Communist Party's united front system.

== History ==
The Foreign Affairs Committee was created in June 1988 during the 7th National Committee of the Chinese People's Political Consultative Conference.

== List of chairpersons ==
| No. | Chairpersons | Took office | Left office | Notes |
|---|---|---|---|---|
| 7th | Zhou Peiyuan | June 1988 | 21 May 1993 | |
| 8th | Han Xu | 21 May 1993 | 19 July 1994 | |
| 8th | Qian Liren | 15 January 1995 | 16 March 1998 | |
| 9th | Tian Zengpei | 16 March 1998 | 15 March 2003 | |
| 10th | Liu Jianfeng | 15 March 2003 | 15 March 2008 | |
| 11th | Zhao Qizheng | 15 March 2008 | 13 March 2013 | |
| 12th | Pan Yunhe | 13 March 2013 | 16 March 2018 | |
| 13th | Lou Jiwei | 16 March 2018 | 13 March 2023 | |
| 14th | He Ping | 13 March 2023 | Incumbent | |

== See also ==
- Foreign Affairs Committee of the National People's Congress
