= Bosnia and Herzegovina–China relations =

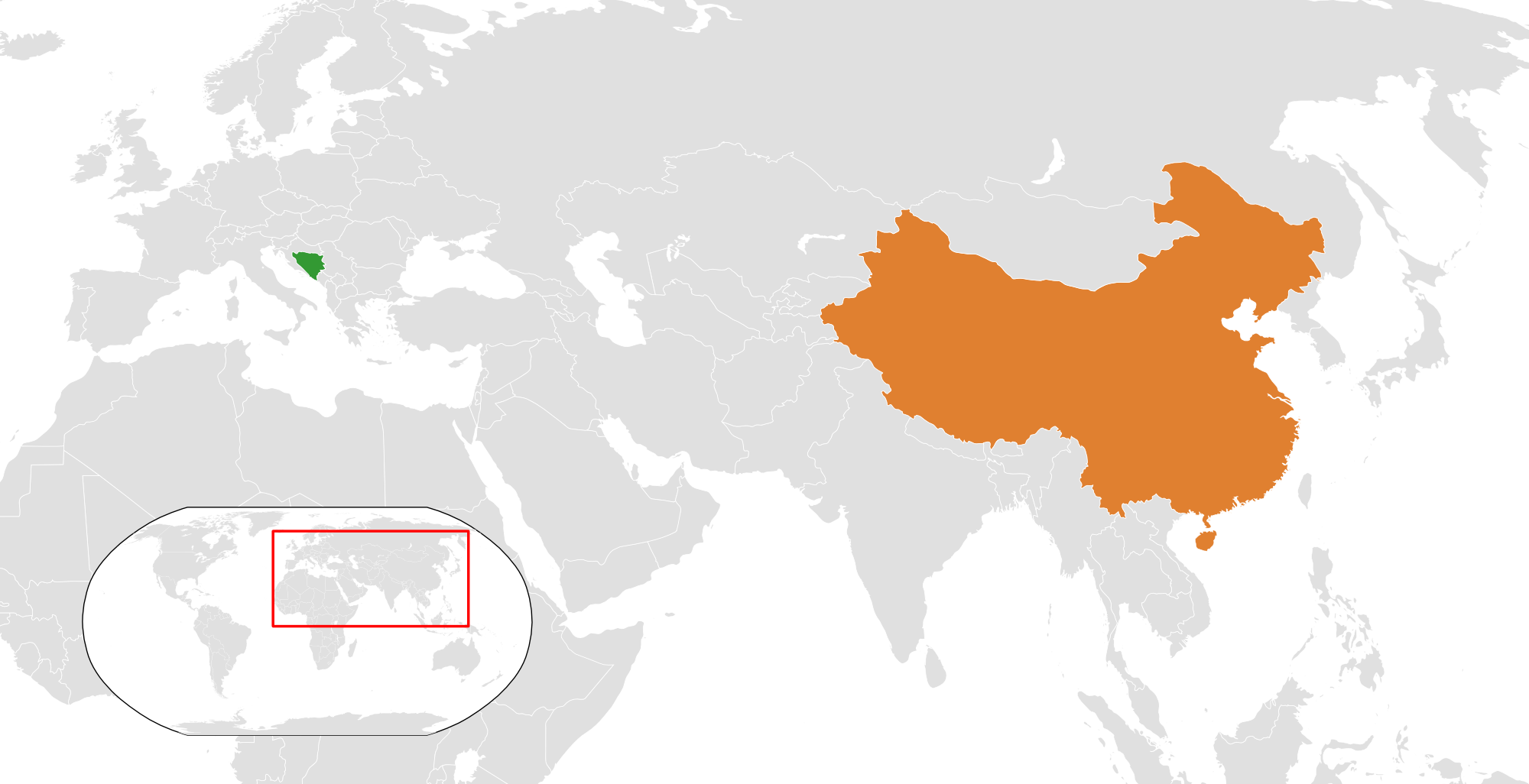

- Bosnia and Herzegovina: China

Diplomatic mission
- Chinese Embassy, Sarajevo: Bosnian Embassy, Beijing

Bosnia and Herzegovina–China refers to the bilateral relations between Bosnia and Herzegovina and the People's Republic of China.

== History ==
Relations were established on 3 April 1995. China has an embassy in Sarajevo, while Bosnia has an embassy in Beijing.

China does not recognize the legitimacy of High Representative for Bosnia and Herzegovina Christian Schmidt.

== Economic relations ==
Bosnia and Herzegovina joined the Belt and Road Initiative (BRI) in 2017.

According to statistics from the General Administration of Customs of China, the bilateral trade volume between China and Bosnia and Herzegovina in 2022 was US$310 million, a year-on-year increase of 12.2%, of which China's exports were US$190 million, a year-on-year increase of 35.3%, and imports were US$120 million, a year-on-year increase of 10.9%. In November 2018, Bosnia and Herzegovina hosted the 3rd China-CEEC Innovation Cooperation Conference. In April 2019, China served as the guest of honor at the Mostar Expo.

== Cultural relations ==
Bosnia and Herzegovina signed a visa exemption agreement with China on November 28, 2017, which came into effect on May 29, 2018.

== See also ==
- Foreign relations of Bosnia and Herzegovina
- Foreign relations of China
- China–Yugoslavia relations
