= China–Montenegro relations =

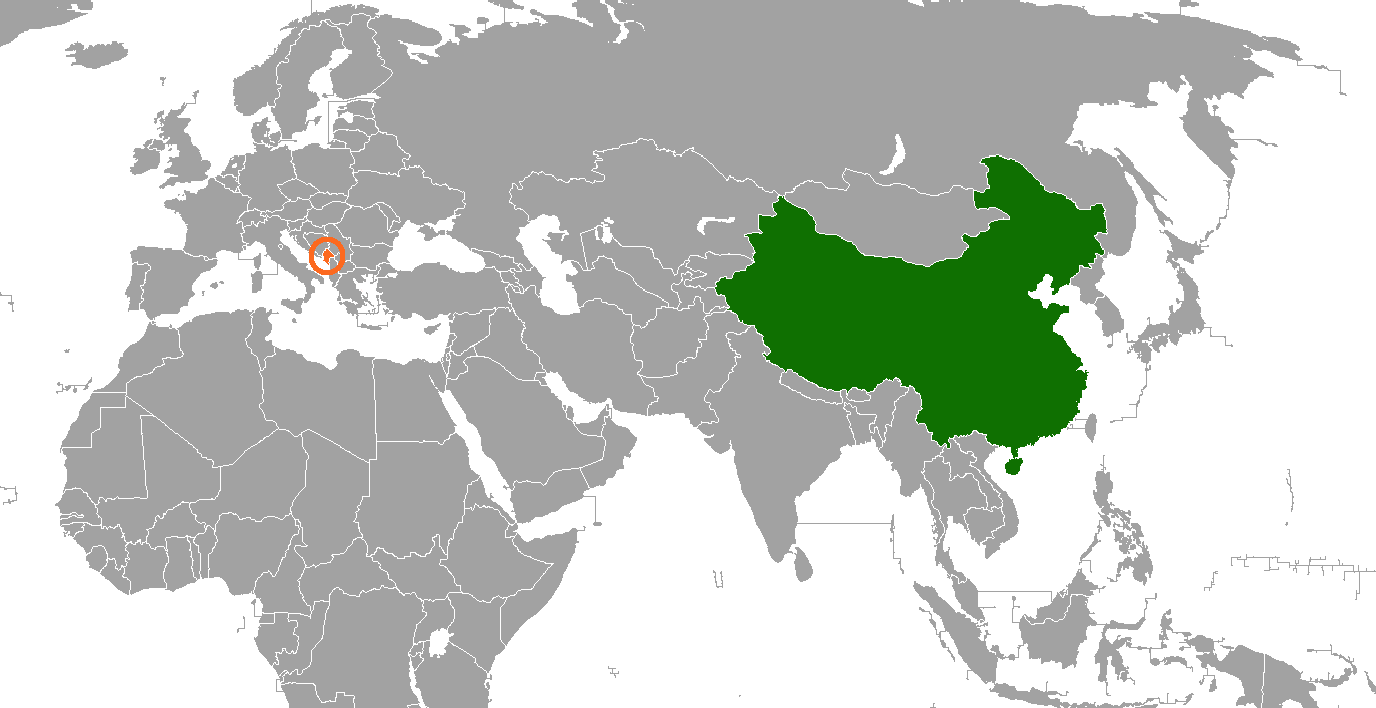

- China: Montenegro

China–Montenegro relations are foreign relations between the People's Republic of China and Montenegro. People's Republic of China has officially recognized Montenegro on June 14, 2006. Diplomatic relations between the two countries were established on July 7, 2006. China transformed its consulate into an embassy in Podgorica on July 7, 2006. The Montenegrin embassy in China opened in Beijing on November 13, 2007.

== Economic relations ==
In 2012, total trade between the two countries amounted 134,406,987 euros, of which imports from Montenegro were 130,605,327 euros, and exports to China were 3,801,660 euros. Direct investment from China to Montenegro amounted to 440,000 euros. China has several projects of investments in the field of construction of highways, power plants and other infrastructures.

Montenegro joined the Belt and Road Initiative (BRI) in 2017.

In 2018, it was reported that a Chinese loan for the first phase of a highway designed to link the Port of Bar on Montenegro's Adriatic coast to landlocked neighbor Serbia sent Montenegro's debt soaring and forced the government to raise taxes, partially freeze public sector wages and end a benefit for mothers.

Despite those measures, Montenegro's debt was expected to approach 80 percent of gross domestic product (GDP) in 2018 and the International Monetary Fund said the country could not afford to take on any more debt.

As of 2021, China holds a quarter of Montenegro's debt.

In 2021, it was reported that the first 41 km section of the Bar-Boljare motorway cost €20m per km, making it one of the most expensive highways per km in the world. If Montenegro were to default, the terms of the contract give China the right to access Montenegrin land as collateral.

== See also ==
- Foreign relations of China
- Foreign relations of Montenegro
- China–Yugoslavia relations
