= China–Slovenia relations =

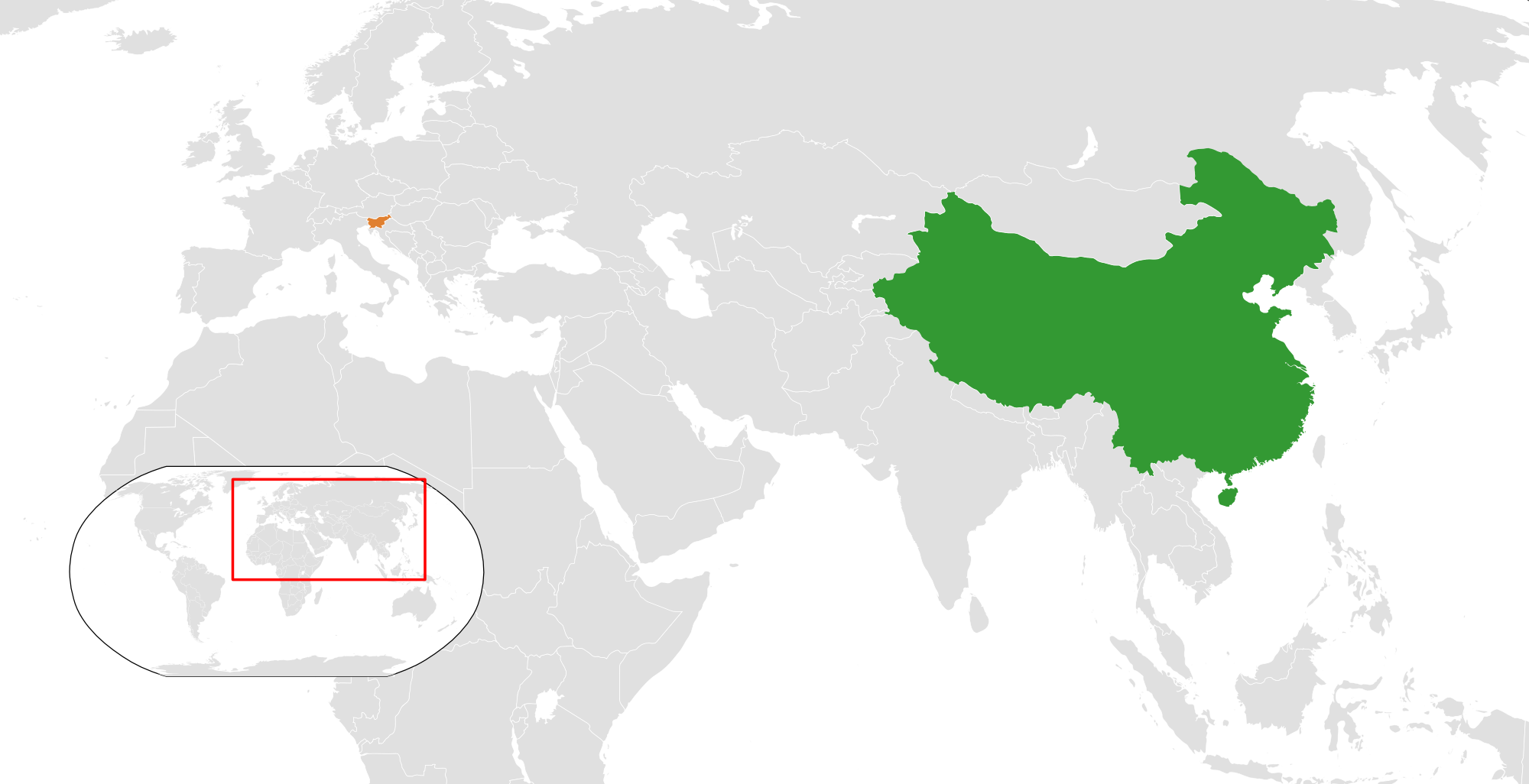

- China: Slovenia

Diplomatic mission
- Slovenian Embassy, Beijing: Chinese Embassy, Ljubljana

China–Slovenia relations refers to the bilateral relations between the People's Republic of China and the Republic of Slovenia.

== History ==
The Socialist Federal Republic of Yugoslavia was established in the second half of 1945. At that time, Slovenia was a part of Yugoslavia. On October 27, 1986, Sichuan Province of China established friendly administrative relations with the Socialist Republic of Slovenia, which was a constituent republic of Yugoslavia.

Slovenia declared independence in June 1991. Germany supported its independence from Yugoslavia and tried to lobby the European Community members who had reservations; however, the People's Republic of China had good diplomatic relations with Yugoslavia at that time. In July 1991, Yugoslavia withdrew its troops and other institutions from Slovenia, which was considered a disguised recognition of Slovenia's independence. On April 27, 1992, the People's Republic of China recognized Slovenia and later established diplomatic relations with the country on May 12 of the same year.

Slovenia joined the Belt and Road Initiative (BRI) in 2017.

On September 13, 2021, Slovenian Prime Minister Janez Janša sent a letter to the leaders of the 27 EU countries to protest against the recall of the ambassador by China for Lithuania's development of relations with Taiwan. He stated that "while respecting the long-standing 'one China' policy, it is undeniable that Taiwan remains an important partner of the EU. Lithuania, like all EU member states, is a sovereign state and has every right to develop relations with Taiwan. We must be more proactive and firmly support Lithuania. We must show China that we stand with each other and we will not let China threaten any of us." In response, China expressed dissatisfaction and criticized Janša. On January 17, 2022, Janša revealed in an interview with Indian TV station DD India that Slovenia plans to enhance its relations with Taiwan like Lithuania, and is negotiating with Taiwan to set up representative offices. Janša described Taiwan as a "democratic country" and bluntly said that it was a pity that China opposed Taiwan's joining the World Health Organization because viruses know no borders. On January 19, Chinese Foreign Ministry spokesperson Zhao Lijian expressed strong opposition to Janša's remarks, believing that his remarks challenged the one-China principle, "supported Taiwan independence," and were dangerous. Zhu Fenglian, spokesperson for the Taiwan Affairs Office of the State Council, urged the Slovenian government to handle Taiwan-related issues with caution and properly.

In April 2022, Janša lost his bid for re-election in the Slovenian parliamentary election. The winner, Robert Golob, took over as prime minister and adopted a more pragmatic policy toward China. Relations between the two countries have warmed up. In October 2024, the Chinese government also included Slovenia in the list of unilateral visa-free countries, allowing citizens of the country to travel to China without a visa.

== Cultural relations ==
During the reign of Emperor Qianlong of the Qing Dynasty, Liu Songling, a Slovenian Jesuit missionary, came to the Qing Dynasty and was appreciated by Emperor Qianlong. He served as an official in the Qing court. He created the astronomical instrument " Jiheng Fuchenyi " and introduced Chinese culture and geography to Europeans. Some scholars consider him to be the "Marco Polo of Slovenia". Emperor Qianlong repeatedly asked Liu Songling to create a globe that could display the territory of the Qing Dynasty, but after Liu Songling's death, the Qing court could no longer manufacture such instruments. The Qing Dynasty book " Li Xiang Kao Cheng Hou Bian " used the research results of European scientist Isaac Newton, which experts believe was the credit of Liu Songling.

Slovenia had already had cultural exchanges with China during the Yugoslavian rule. For example, in 1988, Ljubljana, the largest city in the country, held an exhibition of paintings from the Ming and Qing dynasties, and Slovenian officials attended the opening ceremony of the exhibition.

In the 1990s, academic institutions in China and Slovenia exchanged views on the development of cave tourism and discussed how Yunnan could learn from Slovenia's experience in managing caves as tourist resources. This research was part of the scientific and technological exchanges between the two places.

The University of Ljubljana in Slovenia has a "Confucius Institute for Business". The institute's goal is to promote Chinese culture to local schools, companies and communities, seek business opportunities for the People's Republic of China, and connect the economies of the People's Republic of China and Slovenia. The Confucius Institute provides Chinese language and Chinese culture courses to representatives of local companies, and students have the opportunity to communicate with entrepreneurs doing business in China. The Department of Sports Medicine at the Faculty of Physical Education at the University of Ljubljana offers students acupuncture courses and also offers related examinations. The Department of Asian and African Studies at the Faculty of Arts at the University of Ljubljana has several sinologists whose research areas include Chinese history, philosophy, and art. In China, universities such as Beijing Foreign Studies University and Beijing International Studies University also offer Slovenian language majors.

== Resident diplomatic missions ==
- China has an embassy in Ljubljana.
- Slovenia has an embassy in Beijing and consulates in Shanghai and Hong Kong.

== See also ==
- Foreign relations of China
- Foreign relations of Slovenia
- China–Yugoslavia relations
