= Chinese Materials Research Society =

Chinese professional body and learned society

- Abbreviation: C-MRS
- Founded: 16 May 1991
- Type: Professional organization
- Purpose: Materials Science and Engineering
- Location: Beijing, China
- Region served: China
- Members: 8,000+
- Key people: Wei Bingbo; Li Yuanyuan
- Parent organization: China Association for Science and Technology
- Website: c-mrs.org.cn/en/index.asp

The Chinese Materials Research Society (simplified Chinese: 中国材料研究学会; traditional Chinese: 中國材料研究學會; pinyin: Zhōngguó Yánjiū Xuéhuì; abbreviated C-MRS) is a professional body and learned society in the field of materials science and engineering in China, founded on May 16, 1991. As of 2019, the society has 9 subordinate working committees, 22 branches, 184 unit members and more than 8,000 individual members. It is a constituent of the China Association for Science and Technology (CAST) and a member of the International Union of Materials Research Society (IUMRS). The society provides forums for the exchange of information. It aims at promoting the research and development of all kinds of advanced materials, and striving to promote the practical application of new materials, new processes and new technologies in the industry.

== Scientific publishing ==
- Progress in Natural Science: Materials International (PROG NAT SCI-MATER)
