= 2024 state visits by Xi Jinping to France, Serbia, and Hungary =

2024 Chinese diplomatic tour

State Visit of Xi Jinping to France, Serbia and Hungary
- Venue: Paris, Belgrade and Budapest
- Organised by: Government of France; Government of Serbia; Government of Hungary; Government of China

From May 5–10, 2024, Chinese President and General Secretary of the Chinese Communist Party Xi Jinping made state visits to France, Serbia, and Hungary.

== Background ==
In April 2024, Chinese Director of the Office of the CCP Central Foreign Affairs Commission Wang Yi communicated with Emmanuel Bonne, the diplomatic advisor to the President of France by telephone on a trip for "adding new connotations to the comprehensive strategic partnership between the two countries", days ahead of this expected state visits to Europe.

Xi Jinping's trip coincided with the 25th anniversary of the May 7, 1999 United States bombing of the Chinese embassy in Belgrade, and public opinion has focused on China's attitude and actions toward NATO as reflected in the event.

Hungarian Prime Minister Viktor Orbán's chief of staff Gergely Gulyas told a press conference on April 25, 2024, that Xi Jinping will visit Hungary on May 8–10.

== Visit ==
On the morning of May 5, Xi Jinping left Beijing on a special plane for a state visit to the three countries. Accompanying Xi on the trip were: Xi Jinping's wife Peng Liyuan; Cai Qi (member of the CCP Politburo Standing Committee and Director of the CCP General Office), Wang Yi (member of the CCP Politburo and Minister of Foreign Affairs), and others.

=== France ===
On the afternoon of May 5, 2024, Xi arrived in Paris and began his state visit to France.

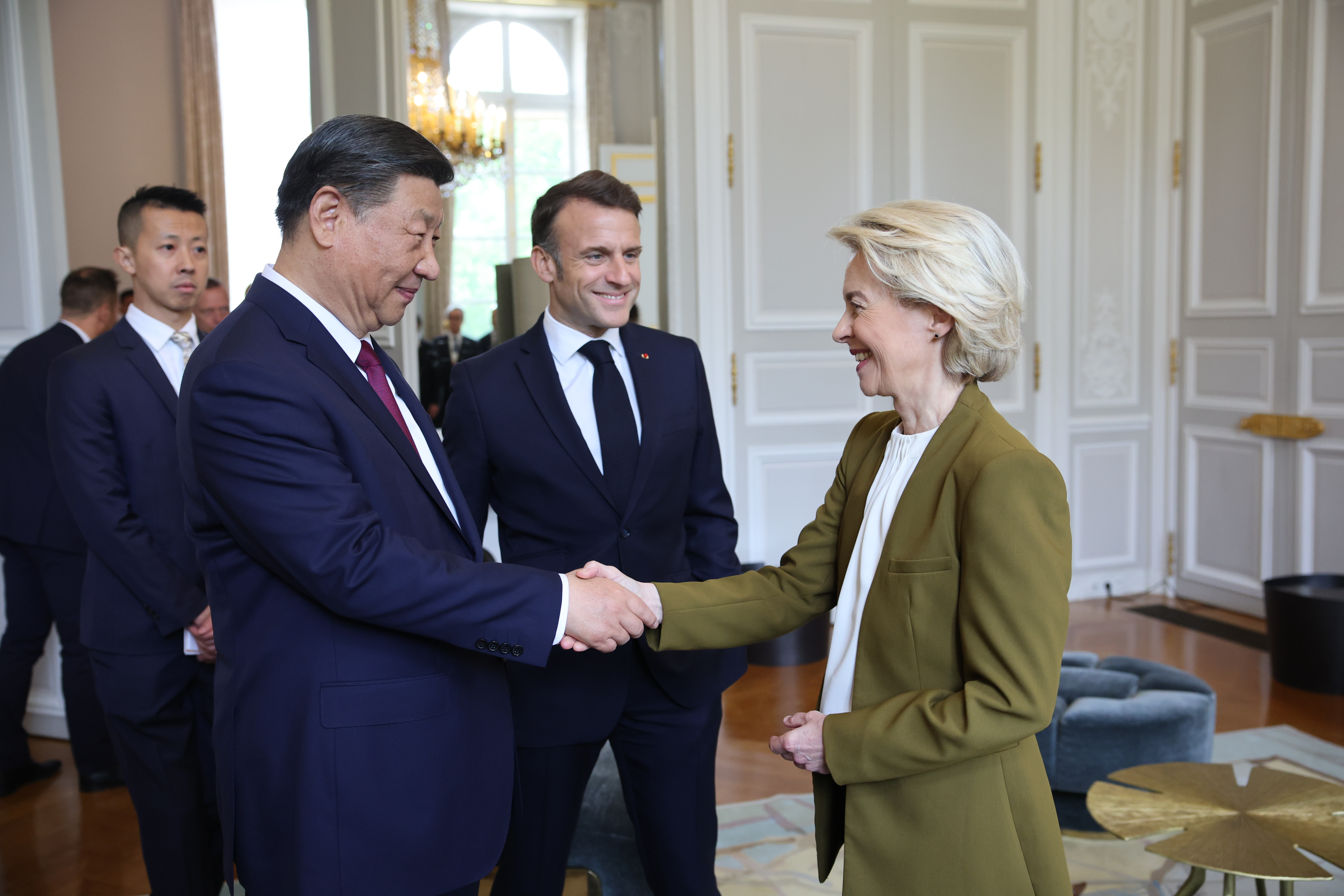
Ursula von der Leyen, Emmanuel Macron, and Xi Jinping at the Elysee Palace in Paris

On May 6, Xi was invited to hold a tripartite meeting of Chinese, French and European leaders with French President Emmanuel Macron and European Commission President Von der Leyen at the Elysee Palace in Paris, where the three sides discussed China–European Union relations, China–France relations, the Russian invasion of Ukraine and the Gaza war. They were greeted by French Prime Minister Gabriel Attal and other senior representatives of the French government.

In the afternoon, Xi held talks with French President Emmanuel Macron at the Elysee Palace. Before the talks, Xi presented Macron with the Beijing Olympic Torch (2022 Winter Olympics and 2008 Summer Olympics) and Macron returning the favor with the Paris Olympic Torch as state gifts.

Xi also attended the closing ceremony of the sixth meeting of the China-France Entrepreneurship Council with Macron in Paris and delivered a keynote speech. In that evening, Xi and his wife Peng Liyuan attended a welcome banquet hosted by Macron and his wife Brigitte at the Elysee Palace. Following discussion on the granting of visas, China has announced to extend the visa-free policy until December 31, 2025, for 12 countries: France, Germany, Italy, the Netherlands, Spain, Malaysia, Switzerland, Ireland, Hungary, Austria, Belgium and Luxembourg.

On May 7, President and Mrs. Macron took President Xi and Mrs. Peng Liyuan to the Hautes-Pyrenees in Pyrenees, the birthplace of Macron's grandmother.

=== Serbia ===
In advance of the visit to Serbia, which overlapped with the 25th anniversary of the United States bombing of the Chinese embassy in Belgrade during the 1999 NATO bombing of Yugoslavia which killed three Chinese journalists, Xi wrote an article in the Serbian newspaper Politika stating, "The friendship between China and Serbia which is soaked in blood that the two peoples spilled together has become a joint memory of the two peoples and will encourage both parties to make together huge steps forward."

On the evening of May 7, Xi Jinping arrived in Belgrade for a state visit to Serbia at the invitation of Serbian President Aleksandar Vučić. When Xi arrived at Belgrade's Nikola Tesla International Airport, he was greeted by Serbian President Vučić and his wife Tamara Vučić, the chairman of the National Council for Cooperation with China and former President Tomislav Nikolić and his wife Dragica Ninković, President of the National Assembly Ana Brnabić, Prime Minister Miloš Vučević and Ministry of Internal Affairs Ivica Dačić.

On the morning of May 8, Xi Jinping held talks with Serbian President Vučić at House of the National Assembly in Belgrade. They signed the Joint Declaration on Deepening and Upgrading the China-Serbia Comprehensive Strategic Partnership and Building a New Era China-Serbia Community of Destiny. The two heads of state also entered bilateral cooperation agreements on topics including joint construction of the Belt and Road Initiative, green development, digital economy, e-commerce, infrastructure, economic and technological development, information and communication, agriculture and food, and media. President Xi also expressed China's support for the Serbian side's efforts to safeguard its national sovereignty and territorial integrity on the Kosovo issue. President Vučić said that Serbia would continue to stand firmly with China on all issues related to China's core interests.

At noon, Vučić and Tamara hosted a welcome banquet for Xi and Peng at House of the National Assembly.

During the visit, Vučić stated, "No one revered Xi more than Serbia."

=== Hungary ===
On the evening of May 8, Xi Jinping arrived in Budapest for a state visit to Hungary. At Ferenc Liszt International Airport, Prime Minister of Hungary Viktor Orbán and his wife Anikó Lévai, Foreign Minister Péter Szijjártó and other senior government officials greeted Xi. On the morning of May 9, Xi attended a welcoming ceremony jointly hosted by Hungarian President Tamás Sulyok and Prime Minister Viktor Orbán in Budapest.

On the afternoon of May 9, Xi held talks with Orbán at the Prime Minister's Office in Budapest. The countries stated that they are satisfied with the Belt and Road Initiative and that China supports Hungary in playing a greater role within the EU on promoting China-EU relations. The visit brought protests concerning human rights in Tibet. The two leaders announced that China-Hungary relations would be upgraded to an all-weather comprehensive strategic partnership.

On the evening of May 10, Xi Jinping took off from Budapest Airport back to Beijing, ending his trip to Europe.

== See also ==
- Foreign policy of China
- Foreign relations of China
- Foreign relations of France
- Foreign relations of Serbia
- List of international trips made by Xi Jinping
