= China–Yugoslavia relations =

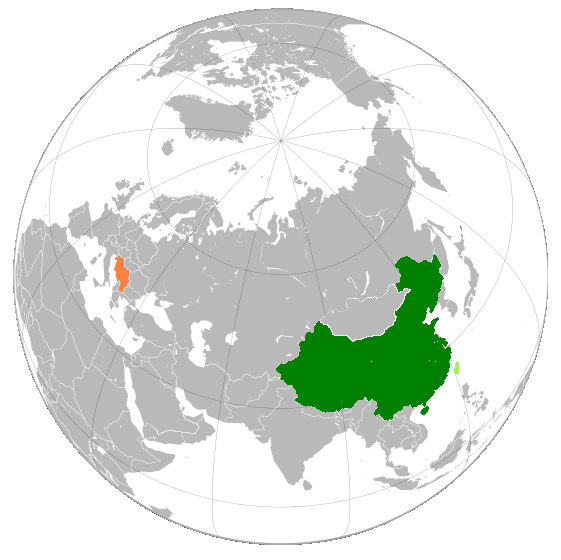

- China: Yugoslavia

China–Yugoslavia relations were historical foreign relations between China and the former Socialist Federal Republic of Yugoslavia. Upon the creation of the People's Republic of China (PRC), Yugoslav communists were quite elated and provided diplomatic support for the emergent government led by the Chinese Communist Party. During the initial phases of the Cold War, China was very critical towards Yugoslavia's perceived liberalism, lack of antagonism with the Western Bloc and Tito's market socialism. Due to these disagreements, the Chinese communists denounced their Yugoslav counterparts as revisionists. Mao Zedong, the Chairman of the PRC, launched a scathing attack on Tito's policies, claiming that Yugoslavia had joined the capitalist bloc and had abandoned socialism. Mao would denounce Tito as having strayed from Marxism–Leninism and basing his ideology on imperialism. Yugoslav communists in turn criticized the Chinese Communist Party's dogmatic and orthodox version of communism.

However, by the end of the 1960s, the relations significantly improved due to the fallout of the Sino-Albanian split. With Albania having denounced both Yugoslavia and China, the two countries formed a good working relationship which continued till the acrimonious breakup of Yugoslavia. Yugoslavia maintained a robust partnership with China, especially in diplomacy and technology. In the 1980s Deng Xiaoping's foreign policy resembled Yugoslavia's stance of being non-aligned and non-confrontational, accompanied with Hu Yaobang's 1983 appraisal of Josip Tito's principles of independence and equality among all communist parties, and of opposing imperialism, colonialism, and hegemonism. The CCP would carefully watch Yugoslavia's market socialism and its disastrous collapse, using the Yugoslav model to create its own form of socialism, known as Socialism with Chinese characteristics. China was firmly on Slobodan Milošević's side in the Kosovo War, which would eventually culminate in strong modern day China–Serbia relations.

All six former Yugoslav republics have a broad memoranda of understanding with China on Belt and Road Initiative. China's relationship with Serbia is particularly strong. Confucius Institutes as well as China-oriented study departments have opened up in Serbia, Croatia and Slovenia.

== Pre-1948 ==
Republic of China–Yugoslavia relations
- China: Yugoslavia

Josip Broz Tito first learned of the Chinese Communist movement while imprisoned at Lepoglava Penitentiary, and, upon his release in 1934, gained firsthand knowledge of the struggle upon meeting the Comintern's representative in China, Ivan Genchev, better known as Karaivanov, in Moscow. Tito would ask Vladimir Dedijer to research China and compile his findings in a book, which, once finished on the eve of the Axis invasion of Yugoslavia in 1941, was distributed amongst the underground Yugoslav Communist movement, which became foundational to the makeup of the early Partisan movement, as it was based upon the Communist Chinese struggle. The most direct result of this indirect communication was the conduct of the Yugoslav partisan's retreat from Montenegro and Herzegovina to Bosnia, which was influenced by the Chinese Communist's Long March.

The first formal meeting between the Chinese Communist Party and League of Communists of Yugoslavia took place in 1947, when a Chinese delegation headed by Liu Ningyi traveled to Yugoslavia. However, relations would break down after the Bucharest Resolution of 1948, endorsed by the Chinese, expelled Yugoslavia from Cominform.

== Cold War ==
China–Yugoslavia relations
- China: Yugoslavia

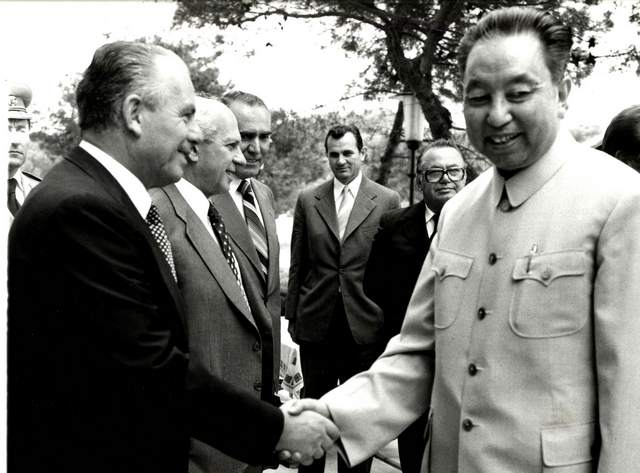
Hua Guofeng at Brijuni, SR Croatia, SFR Yugoslavia, 1978.

In the short and immediate period after the 1948 Tito–Stalin split and at the end of the Chinese Civil War and the Chinese Communist Revolution in 1949, Yugoslav Communists looked at China for a revolutionary ally in defending Marxism-Leninism against what they deemed Soviet revisionism. In the fall of 1949, the new People's Republic of China rejected Belgrade's offer to establish diplomatic relations and adopted the Cominform's anti-Yugoslav position. The Chinese position changed in 1955 after Stalin's death when Mao Zedong welcomed the Yugoslavian Communist Union Delegation and self-critically apologized for poor relations in the past, silence and for "times when we let you down".

The period between 1955 and 1958 saw relations between the two states warm considerably after the Death and state funeral of Joseph Stalin, and in meetings with representatives from Yugoslavia, Mao Zedong stated that there were few differences between the peoples of the two states, other than that “Yugoslavs wore mustaches”.

When the Soviet Union and many other European communist countries withdrew their advisors from China in 1960, advisors from Yugoslavia were among those that remained.

Following the Sino-Soviet split, in late 1960s Beijing invited Albania to moderate its criticisms of Yugoslavia, and to suggest the creation of a Balkan zone (together with Romania) to challenge Soviet influence in the region.

President of Yugoslavia Josip Broz Tito visited China for the first time in 1977, followed by a return visit of Prime Minister of China Hua Guofeng to Yugoslavia in 1978.

== Breakup of Yugoslavia ==
China–Yugoslavia relations
- China: Yugoslavia

Following the breakup of Yugoslavia and Yugoslav Wars judges Li Haopei, Wang Tieya and Liu Daqun from China served at the International Criminal Tribunal for the former Yugoslavia.

The PRC supported the Federal Republic of Yugoslavia during the Kosovo War and opposed the NATO airstrikes against targets in Serbia and Montenegro. The PRC believed that Slobodan Milošević was acting to prevent the secession of Kosovo by Albanian separatists from the FRY, and thus interpreted his actions as preserving the FRY's territorial integrity. The PRC opposed NATO intervention in Kosovo on the basis that it set a dangerous precedent that PRC officials believed could in the future afflict the PRC, should riots occur in Tibet or Xinjiang and then result in bombings. PRC opposition to the NATO actions intensified after the bombing of the PR Chinese embassy in Belgrade during the war. The Kosovo Albanians were labelled as NATO-backed terrorists in the Chinese press, while the Serbs of Yugoslavia were proclaimed as heroes fighting for the unity of their nation.

== See also ==
- Yugoslavia and the Non-Aligned Movement
- World War II in Yugoslavia
- China in World War II
- United States bombing of the Chinese embassy in Belgrade
- Bosnia and Herzegovina–China relations
- China–Croatia relations
- China–Montenegro relations
- China–North Macedonia relations
- China–Serbia relations
- China–Slovenia relations
- China at the 1984 Winter Olympics
