= Henan University of Science and Technology =

University in Luoyang, China

- 河南科技大学
- Motto: 明德博学 日新笃行
- Type: Public
- Established: 1952; 74 years ago
- President: Chen Guang (陈光)
- Faculty: 1817
- Students: 30,000
- Location: Luoyang, Henan, China
- Campus: Urban
- Website: www.haust.edu.cn

Henan University of Science and Technology (HAUST, Chinese: 河南科技大学; pinyin: Hénán Kējì Dàxué) is a comprehensive public university which ranks among the top five in Henan Province. The university is located in Luoyang, Henan province, China. It is granted the right to authorize a joint Ministry of Education to recruit, train units of doctoral students.

== History ==
The root of Henan University of Science and Technology trace back to 1952 with the founding of the Beijing Tractor School (Beijing Chongwenmen Christian Church). In 1956, as part of China's first five year plan, the school relocated to Luoyang to spearhead the construction of a new national industrial base. It was renamed the Luoyang Institute of Technologyin 1958 under the State Ministry of Machine Industry, before eventually transitioning to the management of Henan Provincial People's Government in 1998. In 2002, Luoyang Institute of Technology, founded in 1952, was combined with Luoyang Medical School and Luoyang Agricultural School and the new HAUST was established.

The university has 31 schools, 77 undergraduate programs, 156 Master's degree programs and 25 Doctoral degree program covering science, engineering, agriculture, medicine, economics, management science, literature, law, history, education and other 10 disciplines, with the MBA, Master of Engineering, Master of clinical Medicine, veterinary Medicine master's and professional master's degree in agricultural extension.

== Faculty and Student ==
Henan University of Science and Technology employs approximately 1,250 faculty members with senior professional titles, including professors and associate professors. A total of 1,651 faculty members hold doctoral degrees. The university's teaching and research staff includes over 200 high-level talents, such as Distinguished Professors under the Changjiang Scholars Program, nationally recognized young scholars, and Zhongyuan Scholars.

The university enrolls more than 49,000 full-time students, including undergraduates, postgraduates, and international students, in addition to around 34,000 students in continuing education programs.

== Campus ==
Henan University of Science and Technology operates two campuses: Kaiyuan Campus and Xiyuan Campus. Together, the campuses cover an area of approximately 675 acres, with a total building floor space of 1.59 million square meters. The campuses support the university's teaching, research, and student services.

== International Cooperation ==
Henan University of Science and Technology (HAUST) maintains international cooperation and exchange programs across multiple levels. The university currently operates four Sino-foreign joint education programs, including the independently administered Polytechnic School of Modong. It is among the institutions approved by the Ministry of Education of China to offer bachelor's, master's, and doctoral degree programs to international students.

HAUST has established academic partnerships with over 200 universities and research institutions worldwide, including those in Russia, the United States, the United Kingdom, and other member states of the European Union.

== Notable alumni ==
Li Hejun (born 1957), materials scientist and CAE academician
