= List of ambassadors of China to the Solomon Islands =

Ambassador of China to the Solomon Islands
- 中华人民共和国驻所罗门群岛大使
- Incumbent; Cai Weiming since December 11, 2023
- Inaugural holder: Li Ming
- Formation: 21 September 2019; 6 years ago

The ambassador of China to the Solomon Islands has been the official representatives of the People's Republic of China to the Solomon Islands since 2019.

== List of representatives ==
Diplomatic agrément/Diplomatic accreditation	Ambassador	Chinese language zh:中国驻所罗门群岛大使列表	Observations	List of premiers of the People's Republic of China	Prime Minister of the Solomon Islands	Term end
September 21, 2019			The governments of China and Solomon Islands establish formal diplomatic relations.	Li Keqiang	Manasseh Sogavare	
September 2, 2020	Li Ming	李明		Li Keqiang	Manasseh Sogavare	September 2023
December 11, 2023	Cai Weiming	蔡蔚鸣		Li Qiang	Manasseh Sogavare	

== See also ==
- List of ambassadors of the Republic of China to the Solomon Islands
