= Li Ming (diplomat) =

Chinese politician and diplomat (born 1974)

- 李明

Chinese Ambassador to Serbia
- Incumbent
- Assumed office 2 October 2023
- Preceded by: Chen Bo

Chinese Ambassador to the Solomon Islands
- In office 2 September 2020 – September 2023
- Preceded by: Position established
- Succeeded by: Cai Weiming

Personal details
- Born: September 1974 (age 51) China

Li Ming (Chinese: 李明; pinyin: Lǐ Míng) (Born September 1974) is a Chinese diplomat and politician serving as the current Chinese ambassador to Serbia since 2023. Li previously served as the first (Note: Li Ming is the first ambassador of the People's Republic of China to the Solomon Islands. The country previously recognized the Republic of China (Taiwan) until 2020) Chinese Ambassador to the Solomon Islands from 2020 to 2023.

== Biography ==
Li Joined the Ministry of Foreign Affairs in 1995; from 2000 to 2004, he served as Vice Consul at the Chinese Consulate-General at Toronto, Canada.

From 2004 to 2013, Li served as Second Secretary, Deputy Director, and later Director of the Department of North American and Oceanian Affairs within the Ministry of Foreign Affairs.

From 2013 to 2016, Li served as counselor at the Embassy of the People's Republic of China in Australia, from 2016 to 2020, he served as the Counselor and Deputy Director General at the Department of North American and Oceanian Affairs.

Following Solomon Islands recognition of the People's Republic of China in 2019 (previously recognizing the Republic of China (Taiwan)), Li was appointed as the Ambassador Extraordinary and Plenipotentiary of the People's Republic of China to the Solomon Islands in 2020. He left the Solomons in September 2023, and on 2 October 2023 handed over his credentials as the Chinese ambassador to Serbia.

== Family ==
Li is married; he has one son.
