= Zhang Dake =

Chinese diplomat

Zhang Dake (Chinese: 张大可) was a Chinese diplomat. He was Ambassador of the People's Republic of China to Czechoslovakia (1985–1988), East Germany (1988–1990) and Yugoslavia (1991–1993).

Preceded by Tian Zengpei	Ambassadors of China to Czechoslovakia; 1985–1988	Succeeded by
Preceded by Ma Xusheng	Ambassador of China to East Germany; 1988–1990	Succeeded by Mei Zhaorong (as Ambassador to Germany)
Preceded by Ma Xusheng	Ambassador of China to Yugoslavia; 1991–1993	Succeeded by Zhu Ankang
