= Isolated brain =

Brain kept alive in vitro outside of a body

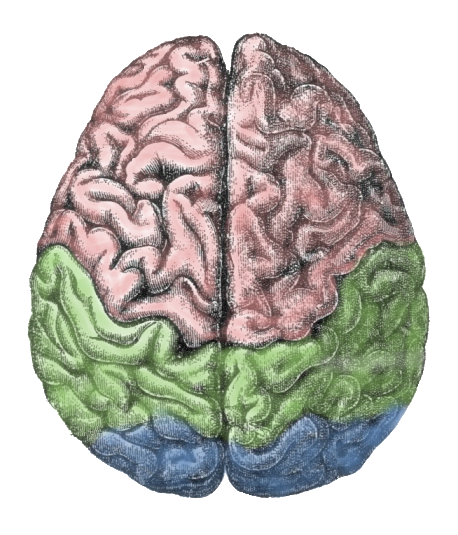
The human brain with its lobes highlighted

An isolated brain is a brain kept alive in vitro, either by perfusion or by a blood substitute, often an oxygenated solution of various salts, or by submerging the brain in oxygenated artificial cerebrospinal fluid (CSF). It is the biological counterpart of brain in a vat. A related concept, attaching the brain or head to the circulatory system of another organism, is called a brain transplant or a head transplant. An isolated brain, however, is more typically attached to an artificial perfusion device rather than a biological body.

The brains of many different organisms have been kept alive in vitro for hours, or in some cases days. The central nervous system of invertebrate animals is often easily maintained as they need less oxygen and to a larger extent get their oxygen from CSF; for this reason their brains are more easily maintained without perfusion. Mammalian brains, on the other hand, have a much lesser degree of survival without perfusion and an artificial blood perfusate is usually used.

For methodological reasons, most research on isolated mammalian brains has been done with guinea pigs. These animals have a significantly larger basilar artery compared to rats and mice, which make cannulation (to supply CSF) much easier.

== History ==
- 1812 – César Julien Jean Legallois (a.k.a. Legallois) put forth the original idea for resuscitating severed heads through the use of blood transfusion.
- 1818 – Mary Shelley published Frankenstein; or, the Modern Prometheus.
- 1836 – Astley Cooper showed in rabbits that compression of the carotid and vertebral arteries leads to death of an animal; such deaths can be prevented if the circulation of oxygenated blood to the brain is rapidly restored.
- 1857 – Charles Brown-Sequard decapitated a dog, waited ten minutes, attached four rubber tubes to the arterial trunks of the head, and injected blood containing oxygen by means of a syringe. Two or three minutes later, voluntary movements of the eyes and muscles of the muzzle resumed. After cessation of oxygenated blood transfusion, movements stopped.
- 1884 – Jean Baptiste Vincent Laborde made what appears to be first recorded attempt to revive the heads of executed criminals by connecting the carotid artery of the severed human head to the carotid artery of a large dog. According to Laborde's account, in isolated experiments a partial restoration of brain function was attained.
- 1912 – Corneille Heymans maintained life in an isolated dog's head by connecting the carotid artery and jugular vein of the severed head to the carotid artery and jugular vein of another dog. Partial functioning in the severed head was maintained for a few hours.
- 1928 – Sergei Brukhonenko showed that life could be maintained in the severed head of a dog by connecting the carotid artery and jugular vein to an artificial circulation machine.
- 1963 – Robert J. White isolated the brain from one monkey and attached it to the circulatory system of another animal.
- 1993 – Rodolfo Llinás captured the whole brain of a guinea pig in a fluidic profusion system in vitro which survived for around 8 hours and indicates that field potentials were similar to those described in vivo.
- 2023 – In a study focused on maintaining pig brain function, a group of researchers from University of Texas Southwestern Medical Center succeeded in an experiment related to brain isolation in vivo, researchers developed an extracorporeal pulsatile circulatory control (EPCC) system. This system allowed for the independent regulation of cerebral hemodynamics, distinct from the body's systemic circulation. By surgically altering blood flow to the pig's head and employing a computer algorithm, the experiment aimed to replicate natural blood pressure, flow, and pulsatility. Results showed that under EPCC, brain activity, cerebral oxygenation, pressure, temperature, and microscopic structure remained largely unchanged or minimally perturbed for several hours, as compared to the normal circulation state. This outcome highlights the feasibility of studying neural activity and its circulatory manipulation in isolation from the rest of the organism.

== In philosophy ==
In philosophy, the brain in a vat is any of a variety of thought experiments intended to draw out certain features of ideas about knowledge, reality, truth, mind, and meaning. A contemporary version of the argument originally given by Descartes in Meditations on First Philosophy (i.e., that he could not trust his perceptions on the grounds that an evil demon might, conceivably, be controlling his every experience), the brain in a vat is the idea that a brain can be fooled into anything when fed appropriate stimuli.

The inherently philosophical idea has also become a staple of many science fiction stories, with many such stories involving a mad scientist who might remove a person's brain from the body, suspend it in a vat of life-sustaining liquid, and connect its neurons by wires to a supercomputer which would provide it with electrical impulses identical to those the brain normally receives. According to such science fiction stories, the computer would then be simulating a virtual reality (including appropriate responses to the brain's own output) and the person with the "disembodied" brain would continue to have perfectly normal conscious experiences without these being related to objects or events in the real world.

No such procedure in humans has ever been reported by a research paper in a scholarly journal, or other reliable source. Also, the ability to send external electric signals to the brain of a sort that the brain can interpret, and the ability to communicate thoughts or perceptions to any external entity by wire is well beyond current technology.

== Grown ==
In 2004 Thomas DeMarse and Karl Dockendorf made an "adaptive flight control with living neuronal networks on microelectrode arrays".

Teams at the Georgia Institute of Technology and the University of Reading have created neurological entities integrated with a robot body. The brain receives input from sensors on the robot body and the resultant output from the brain provides the robot's only motor signals.

== In fiction ==
The concept of a brain in a jar (or brain in a vat) is a common theme in science fiction.

=== Literature ===
- Louis Ulbach's story "Le Prince Bonifacio" (1860) features scenes about a disembodied brain.
- In Dick Donovan's story "Some Experiments with a Head" (1889), the head of a guillotined man is reanimated by electricity.
- In Carl Grunert's story "Mr. Vivacius Style" (1908), the severed head of a journalist is revived in a laboratory.
- In Raymond Roussel's novel Locus Solus (1914), the tissues of Georges Danton's head reproduce the speeches he had uttered before his execution.
- In E. F. Benson' story "And the Dead Spake..." (1922), the brain of a housekeeper is connected to a gramophone.
- An isolated brain gets psychic powers in the short story "The Brain in the Jar" (1924), by Norman Elwood Hammerstrom and Richard F. Searight.
- In Alexander Beliaev's novel Professor Dowell's Head (1925), Professor Dowell discovers a way of keeping heads of dead people alive and even to give them new bodies. After his death Dowell himself becomes a subject of such an experiment.
- In Guy Dent's novel Emperor of the If (1926), an isolated brain that formerly belonged to a greengrocer has the power to create alternate realities.
- The Mi-go aliens in the Cthulhu Mythos of H. P. Lovecraft, first appearing in the story "The Whisperer in Darkness" (1931), can transport humans from Earth to Pluto (and beyond) and back again by removing the subject's brain and placing it into a "brain cylinder", which can be attached to external devices to allow it to see, hear, and speak.
- In Edmond Hamilton's Captain Future novels series (1940), the character Prof. Simon Wright is a human brain living in a transparent case.
- In Donovan's Brain (see term), the 1942 science fiction novel by Curt Siodmak (filmed three times in different versions: 1944, 1953, and 1962), the brain of a ruthless millionaire is kept alive in a tank where it grows to monstrous proportions and powers.
- The final novel in C.S. Lewis's "Space Trilogy", That Hideous Strength (1945), uses the isolated brain of Francois Alcasan, an Algerian radiologist guillotined for murder, as a plot device. At some point in the novel, it is revealed that Alcasan's artificially-perfused head is used to allow evil intelligence to communicate with humans directly.
- In Roald Dahl's short story "William and Mary" (1960), after William's death his brain is kept alive on an artificial heart.
- In Madeleine L'Engle's novel A Wrinkle in Time (1963), the character IT is a disembodied telepathic brain that dominates the planet of Camazotz.
- In Cordwainer Smith's short novel The Boy Who Bought Old Earth (1963, also published as The Planet Buyer, and later included in the longer novel Norstrilia in 1975), the protagonist Rod McBan is "scunned": his head is pickled, his body dehydrated and freeze-dried, and all reconstituted at his destination, for transit via interstellar economy class.
- In Frank Herbert's novel Destination Void (1966), a spaceship is controlled by disembodied human brain called an Organic Mental Core.
- The Ruinators, later known as the Demiurges, are the immensely cyborgized alien society in Humans as Gods, the 1966–1977 sci-fi trilogy by Sergey Snegov. They use the isolated brains of the highly intelligent species Galaxians as the organic supercomputers in charge of the Metrics Stations, the primary and most secret military defense structure of the Ruinators' Empire. The brains are being extracted from the prisoners' babies and grown artificially in the spheres filled with the nutrient liquid. Among the most important characters of the second and third novels comes the Brain of the Third Planet, later known as Vagrant or Voice, who has somehow developed self-consciousness and later rebelled against the Ruinators. Due to the Vagrant's fervent desire for a life of those embodied, the Brain has been surgically put into a dragon's body, whose inherent brain was destroyed in a recent battle. Vagrant enjoyed a sentient dragon's life for a few decades after that, until the body grew too senile, and on the threshold of the dragon's death the brain was removed again to assume control over a starship.
- In the novel Gray Matters (1971) by William Hjortsberg, the protagonist and his acquaintances are all disembodied brains, preserved underground after a nuclear war.
- In P. C. Jersild's novel A Living Soul (1980), a human brain is living in an aquarium, and is a subject of medical experiments
- In Legends of Dune (2002–2004), a prequel trilogy to the novel Dune, cymeks are disembodied brains that wear robotic bodies.

=== Television ===
- The Outer Limits episode "The Brain of Colonel Barham" details the story of a dying astronaut, Colonel Barham. It is decided to separate his brain from his body and keep his brain alive, with neural implants connecting it to visual and audio input/output for the mission. But without a body, the brain becomes extremely powerful and megalomaniacal.
- Isolated brains also appear in The Wild Wild West. In the episode "The Night of the Druid's Blood", one of James West's old tutors is killed and West discovers that it is Dr Tristam who has removed the brains from the bodies and is forcing them to work for him. Finally West manages to communicate to the isolated brains that if they all work together they can destroy Dr Tristam and have peace.
- Isolated brains also appeared in Star Trek. In the episode "The Gamesters of Triskelion", the Providers are disembodied brains that kidnap individuals in order to force them to fight against each other. Later, in the episode "Spock's Brain", Spock's brain is removed by a native of the Sigma Draconis system in order to serve as the Eymorg Controller. Due to Vulcan physiology, Spock's body remains alive. The crew of the Enterprise follow an ion trail to Sigma Draconis VI where, using the knowledge of the Eymorg, Dr. Leonard McCoy restores Spock's brain to his body.
- In the 1970s Doctor Who serial The Brain of Morbius, Solon, an authority on micro-surgical techniques, transplants Morbius's brain into an artificial translucent brain cylinder casing. Additionally, in the modern Doctor Who series (2005–present), the recurring antagonists known as the Cybermen are presented as human brains (in one instance, an entire human head) encased in mechanical exoskeletons, connected by an artificial nervous system; this is ostensibly done as an "upgrade" from the comparatively fragile human body to a far more durable and longer-lasting shell. Another group of modern Doctor Who foes, the Toclafane, were revealed to be human heads encased in flying, weaponized spheres, the final forms of humans from the far future who turned to desperate measures in order to survive the conditions of the impending heat death of the universe. In the Doctor Who episodes "The End of the World" and "New Earth", Lady Cassandra is an isolated brain attached to a canvas of skin with a face.
- The Wonder Woman episode "Gault's Brain" features the classic "brain in a vat".
- Observer from Mystery Science Theater 3000 carries his brain in a Petri dish.
- The science fantasy television series LEXX includes a robot head containing human brain tissue. Also whenever the current Divine Shadow body dies his brain is removed and placed in a device that allows him to speak and kept with rest of the Divine Predecessors.
- In the animated series Futurama, numerous technological advances have been made by the 31st-century. Within the show, the ability to keep heads alive in jars was invented by Ron Popeil (who has a guest cameo in "A Big Piece of Garbage") and has resulted in many 21st-century political figures and celebrities still being active; this was the writers' way to feature and poke fun at celebrities. In "The Day the Earth Stood Stupid" the Big Brain, an isolated brain and leader of the Brainspawn, is outwitted by Fry. The brain's disciples have been attempting to dumb down every lifeform they meet to enable them to steal all the universe's data and hoard it in the infosphere.
- In the animated series Evil Con Carne, the main character Hector Con Carne was reduced to a brain and a stomach in two jars. Both of them move and talk, even without jars. Hector's brain sometimes controls the bear Boskov while Hector's stomach digests parts of Boskov's food.
- The 2011 web series The Mercury Men features a brain in a jar ("The Battery") that can communicate telepathically and over a walkie-talkie-like devices and is revealed to control the "mercury men" for a catastrophic plan to destroy Earth.

=== Film ===
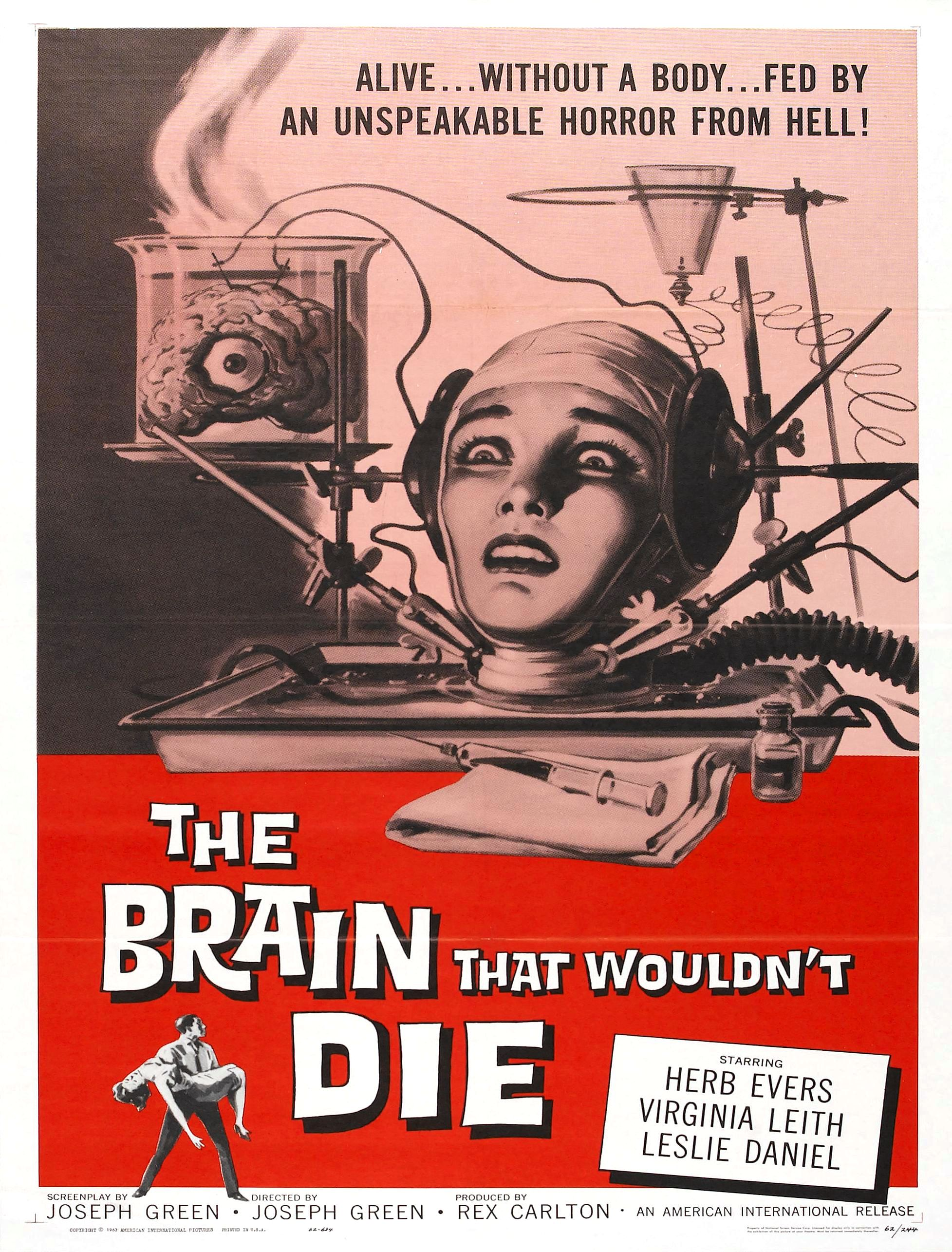
A monstrous brain in a jar, in a poster for The Brain That Wouldn't Die

- In The Man with Two Brains (1983), the protagonist, pioneering neurosurgeon Michael Hfuhruhurr, falls in love with a disembodied brain that communicates with him telepathically.
- In Blood Diner (1987), two cannibal brothers bring their uncle's (isolated) brain back to life to help them in their quest to restore life to the five-million-year-old goddess Shitaar. Their uncle's brain instructs them to collect the required parts to resurrecting Shitaar – virgins, assorted body parts, and the ingredients for a "blood buffet".
- In RoboCop 2 (1990), the brain, eyes, and much of the nervous system of the Detroit drug lord Cain is harvested by OCP officials to use in their plans for an upgraded "RoboCop 2" cyborg. These systems are stored in a vat shortly after the surgery, where the disembodied Cain can still see the remains of his former body being discarded before being placed into the fitted robotic skeleton.
- The mad scientist in the French film The City of Lost Children (1995) has a "brain in a vat" for a companion.
- In Crank: High Voltage (2009), Ricky Verona's head is kept alive in a tank so that he can watch his brother kill their enemy.
- Pacific Rim Uprising (2018) has a brain kept alive through artificial means as a way for new Jaeger pilots to practice drifting.

=== Comics ===
- More Fun Comics #62 (Dec. 1940) had the Spectre battle a human brain in a vat that had developed enormous powers and become mobile and sprouted an arm.
- DC Comics villain Hfuhruhurr, an enemy of Superman, removes and preserves the brains of others as part of the Union, believing that doing so will give them a form of immortality.
- Marvel Comics mutant character Martha Johansson was the victim of the U-Men, who removed her brain and placed it in a jar to harness her telepathic abilities.

=== Anime and manga ===
- Many people in the Ghost in the Shell manga and anime franchise possess cyberbrains, which can sustain a modified human brain within a cybernetic body indefinitely.
- One of the main antagonists in the anime series Psycho-Pass, the Sibyl System, is a secret organization of former criminals who, upon joining the group, had their brains surgically removed from their bodies and placed inside glass containers in an underground complex, from where they surveiled the country's citizens.

=== Video games ===
- In the Fallout series of games, isolated brains are used to control robots called "Robobrains". In the Old World Blues downloadable content for the video game Fallout: New Vegas a group of scientists, dubbed the "Think Tank", have a more advanced version of the technology.
- The video game Cortex Command revolves around the idea of brains being separated from physical bodies, and used to control units on a battlefield.
- The Mother Brain from the game Metroid.
- In Streets of Rage 3, Mr. X is now a brain in a jar that fights by controlling a robot named Robot Y, known as Neo X in the Japanese version.
- In The Evil Within, the brain of Ruvik, the antagonist of the game, is removed and placed in vitro suspension in order to operate STEM.
- In Lies of P's Overture DLC, there is a mini-quest that follows a character eventually revealed to be a brain in a vat. Despite the character stating his name, during the final dialogue's subtitles he is referred to as "Brain in a Vat".

=== Other ===
- A brainship is a fictional concept of an interstellar starship. A brainship is made by inserting the disembodied brain and nervous system or malformed body of a human being into a life-support system, and connecting it surgically to a series of computers via delicate synaptic connections (a brain–computer interface). The brain "feels" the ship (or any other connected peripherals) as part of its own body. An example, The Ship Who Sang (1969) short story collection by science fiction author Anne McCaffrey is about the brainship Helva. "Mr. Spaceship" (1959) is an earlier story by Philip K. Dick about a brainship.
- The B'omarr Monks, of the Star Wars Universe, would surgically remove their brains from their bodies and continue their existence as a brain in a jar. They believe that cutting themselves off from civilization and all corporeal distractions leads to enlightenment. In Return of the Jedi, one such monk is the spider-like creature that walks past C-3PO as he enters Jabba's Palace.
- Krang from Teenage Mutant Ninja Turtles.
- The Advanced Dungeons & Dragons game supplement Monstrous Compendium MC15: Ravenloft Appendix II: Children of the Night (1993) features Rudolph Von Aubrecker, a living brain and villain character. The idea was republished as brain in a jar in the third edition Libris Mortis (2004) and fourth edition in Open Grave (2009) D&D books. Tyler Linn of Cracked.com identified the brain-in-a-jar as one of "15 Idiotic Dungeons and Dragons Monsters" in 2009, humorously stating: "...It's a brain in a jar. Fuck, just kick it over, who's going to know?" The elder brains, directing force of the illithid race in the game, are also gigantic disembodied brains with powerful psionic powers floating in a tank.

== See also ==
- Boltzmann brain
- Locked-in syndrome
- Simulated reality
