= Brain transplant =

Theoretical medical procedure in which the brain is placed into a different body

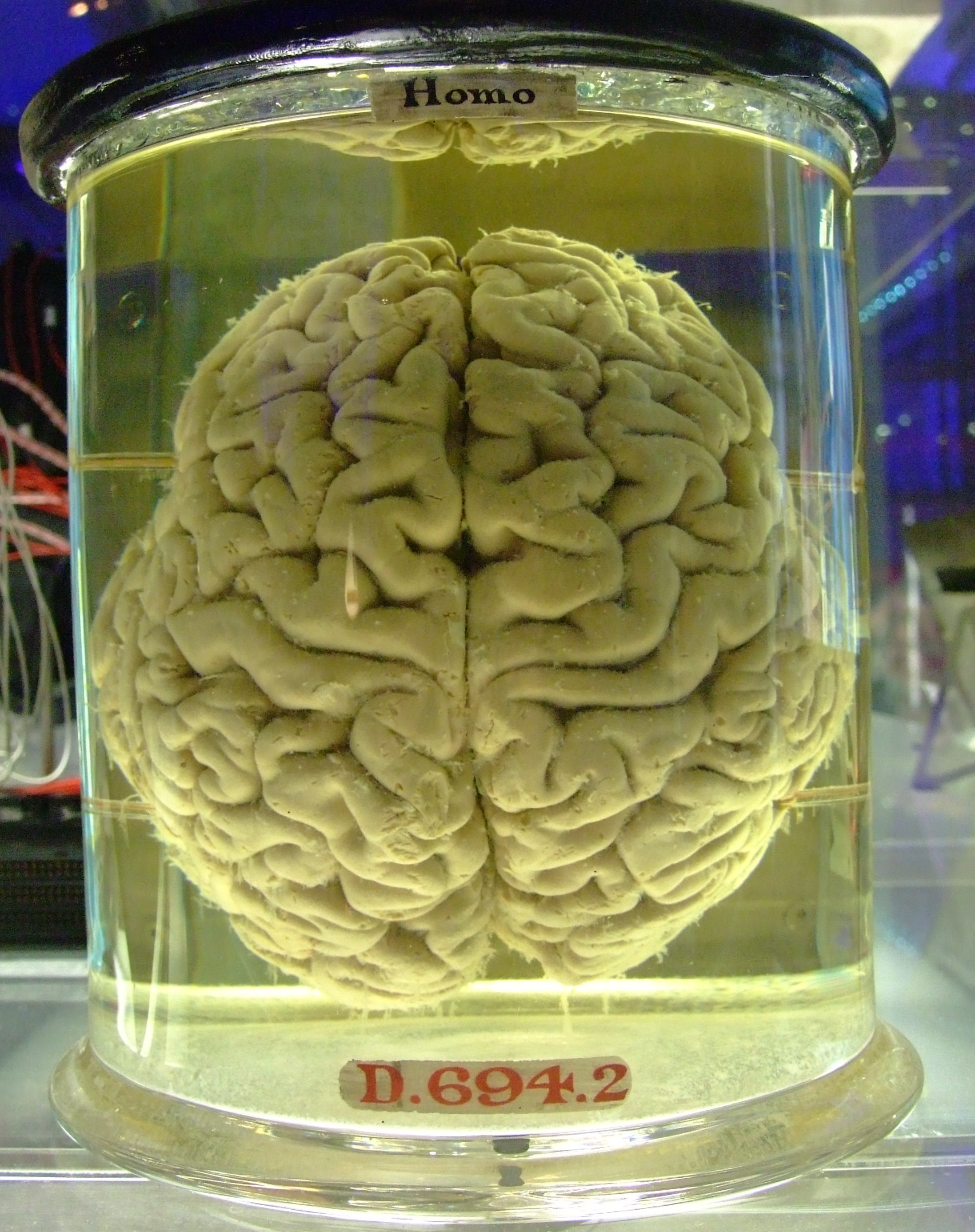
A human brain in a jar.

A brain transplant, brain cell transplant, or whole-body transplant is a procedure in which the brain of one organism is transplanted into the body of another organism. It is a procedure distinct from head transplantation, which involves transferring the entire head to a new body, as opposed to the brain only. Theoretically, a person with complete organ failure could be given a new and functional body while keeping their own personality, memories, and consciousness through such a procedure. Neurosurgeon Robert J. White has grafted the head of a monkey onto the headless body of another monkey. Electroencephalography (EEG) readings showed the brain was later functioning normally. Initially, it was thought to prove that the brain was an immunologically privileged organ, as the host's immune system did not attack it at first, but immune rejection caused the monkey to die after nine days.

== Existing challenges ==
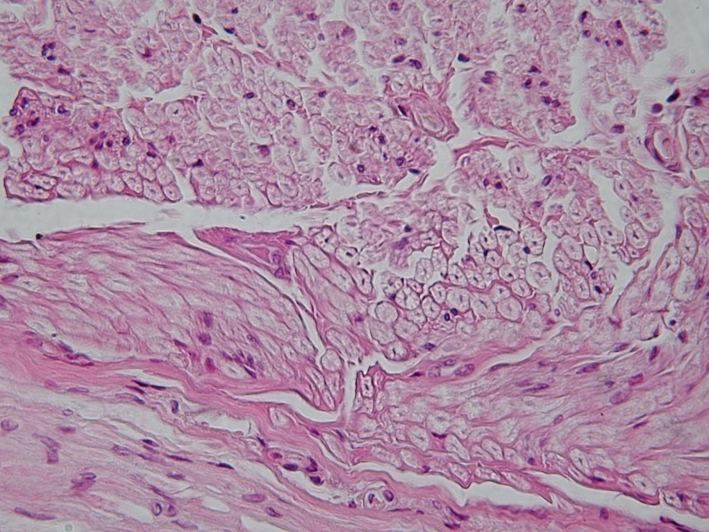
Cross section view of nerve tissue.

One of the most significant barriers to the procedure is the inability of nerve tissue to heal properly; scarred nerve tissue does not transmit signals well, which is why spinal cord injuries devastate muscle function and sensation.

Alternatively, a brain–computer interface can be used connecting the subject to their own body. A study using a monkey as a subject shows that it is possible to directly use commands from the brain, bypass the spinal cord and enable hand function. An advantage is that this interface can be adjusted after the surgical interventions are done where nerves can not be reconnected without surgery.

Also, for the procedure to be practical, the age of the donated body must be close to that of the recipient brain: an adult brain cannot fit into a skull that has not reached its full growth, which occurs at age 9–12 years.

When organs are transplanted, aggressive transplant rejection by the host's immune system can occur. Because immune cells of the central nervous system (CNS) contribute to the maintenance of neurogenesis and spatial learning abilities in adulthood, the brain has been hypothesized to be an immunologically privileged (unrejectable) organ. However, immunorejection of a functional transplanted brain has been reported in monkeys.

== Partial brain transplant ==
In 1982, Dr. Dorothy T. Krieger, chief of endocrinology at Mount Sinai Medical Center in New York City, achieved success with a partial brain transplant in mice.

In 1998, a team of surgeons from the University of Pittsburgh Medical Center attempted to transplant a group of brain cells to Alma Cerasini, who had suffered a severe stroke that caused the loss of mobility in her right limbs as well as had limited speech. The team hoped that the cells would correct the listed damage. She died later on.

== See also ==
- Cyborgs in fiction (for stories of brains transplanted into wholly artificial bodies)
- Donovan's Brain
- Isolated brain
- Robotics
- Robert J. White
- Martin R. Ralph (for experiments done with mice to restore circadian rhythms)
- Professor Dowell's Head
