= Vladimir Demikhov =

Soviet organ transplantation pioneer

- Demikhov (far right) performing a heart operation at the Sklifosovsky Institute in 1968
- Born: 31 July [O.S. 18 July] 1916; Kulikovsky, Don Host Oblast, Russian Empire
- Died: November 22, 1998 (aged 82); Moscow, Russian Federation
- Education: Moscow State University (D.Sc.)
- Known for: The founder of the transplantation of vital organs
- Scientific career
- Fields: Transplantation
- Workplaces: Moscow State University
- Thesis: The transplantation of vital organs in the experiment

Vladimir Petrovich Demikhov (Russian: Владимир Петрович Демихов; 31 July 1916 – 22 November 1998) was a Soviet Russian scientist and organ transplantation pioneer, who performed several transplants in the 1940s and 1950s, including the transplantation of a heart into an animal and a heart–lung replacement in an animal. He is also well known for his dog head transplants, which he conducted during the 1950s, resulting in two-headed dogs. This ultimately led to the head transplants in monkeys by Robert White, who was inspired by Demikhov's work.

== Early life ==
Vladimir P. Demikhov was born on July 31, 1916, into a family of Russian peasants living on a small farmstead in the northern part of Russia's Volgograd region. His father, Pyotr Yakovlevich Demikhov was killed during the Russian Civil War when Demikhov was about three years old, so he and his brother and sister were raised by their mother, Domnika Alexandrovna, who managed to provide them with a good education. He began to show an interest in the mammalian circulatory system as a teenager, and is also known to have been inspired by Pavlov's experimental work with dogs. When he left school in 1931, his first job was at the Stalingrad Tractor Plant where he worked as a mechanic and repairman.

In 1934, Demikhov began studying at the Voronezh State University, where in 1937 he created the world's first artificial heart and successfully implanted it into a dog (which survived for two hours after the surgery). A description of this groundbreaking work was published in April 1938 in the university's student newspaper, and it was presented to the other students at a scientific conference the following month. He then transferred to the Biology Faculty of Moscow State University, where he wrote his first scientific work, and graduated with honors in August 1940.

Soon after graduation, Demikhov was conscripted into military service and became a soldier in the Red Army; when the Soviet Union was drawn into the Second World War in June 1941, he served on the front line as a forensic expert and pathologist, and spent time serving in China when the Soviets declared war on Japan in 1945. He returned home at the end of the war with a number of medals and a military decoration. He married Liya Nikolayevna in August 1946, and their daughter Olga was born in July 1947.

== Career ==
After the war, Demikhov resumed his post in the human physiology department at Moscow State University, where he continued his experimental research, eventually performing successful heart and lung transplants on warm-blooded animals. In 1947, he moved to the Institute of Surgery in Moscow where he began to experiment with liver and kidney transplantation in the late 1940s.

He spent the 1950s carrying out research into organ transplantation surgery, continuously improving his experimental techniques. He successfully performed an isolated orthotopic heart transplantation in a dog in 1951 (where the heart was correctly positioned rather than offset inside the thoracic cavity). The survival rates steadily increased from a few hours to several weeks, and one of the dogs that received a heart transplant in 1953 survived for another seven years after the operation. A successful mammary–coronary artery anastomosis was achieved in 1953, after unsuccessful attempts the previous year. Demikhov also developed the principles of myocardial revascularization, which enabled him to perform the first experimental coronary artery bypass operation. The ultimate aim of his research was for organ transplantations to be implemented in clinical practice on humans.

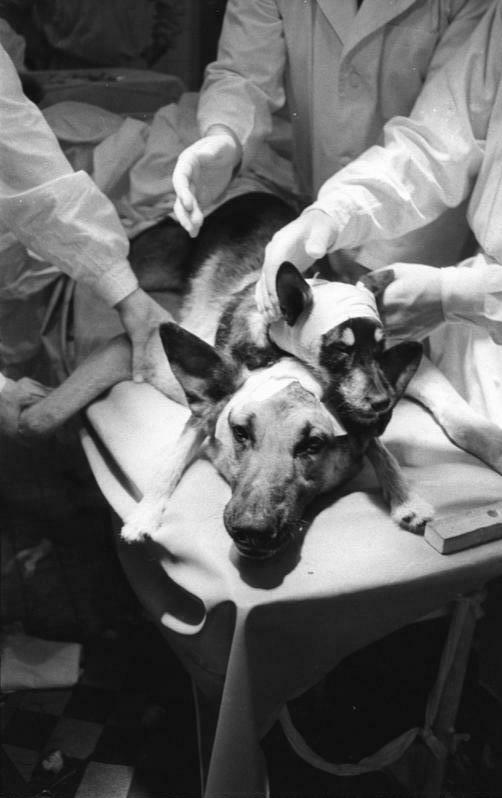
The last dog head transplant performed by Vladimir Demikhov on January 13, 1959, in East Germany

In February 1954, he transplanted a dog's head onto another dog, using vascular connections to the host dog's heart. Ignoring the condemnation from his critics, he continued with this particular line of experimentation, becoming more successful with time. His transplantation work was widely reported inside the Soviet Union, where it was continuously criticized for being unethical, but it was not until the late 1950s that news of his experiments spread to the outside world. In fact, by the time American surgeons became aware of Demikhov's dog head transplantations in 1959, he had already been performing these procedures for five years.

Demikhov coined the word "transplantology", meaning organ transplantation, in his 1960 monograph Experimental Transplantation of Vital Organs, for which he received his doctoral degree. Later translated into English (1962), German (1963) and Spanish (1967), this became a hugely influential publication for physicians interested in the emerging field of organ and tissue transplantation, and was for some considerable time the only monograph on the subject.

He joined the Sklifosovsky Institute of Emergency Medicine in 1960, where he remained until his retirement in 1986. His main goal was to push for the introduction into routine surgical practice of vital organ transplantation in humans, using "revitalized" (living) organs rather than artificial ones. His ideas were the subject of immense criticism. U.S. physicians started to learn about his techniques in the 1960s, when many of them traveled to the Soviet Union to watch Soviet surgeons at work. By 1962, the opinion of the American medical community had shifted and they gradually warmed to the idea of one day successfully transplanting human organs.

One admirer of his work was South African cardiac surgeon Christiaan Barnard, who became convinced through studying Demikhov's experiments that human heart transplantation was a real possibility. Barnard twice visited Demikhov's laboratory in Moscow, in 1960 and 1963, and inspired by his observations there, he successfully performed the world's first heart transplant operation from one person to another in 1967. He would later credit Demikhov's earlier experiments for making all this possible, calling him "[the] father of heart and lung transplantation".

== Scientific contribution ==
Demikhov is perhaps most famous for his two-headed dog experiments. He achieved a substantial number of world's firsts:

- 1937 – first cardiac assist device (artificial heart)
- 1946 – first intrathoracic heterotopic heart transplant (into chest cavity)
- 1946 – first heart–lung transplant
- 1947 – first lung transplant
- 1948 – first liver transplant
- 1951 – first orthotopic (correctly positioned) heart transplant
- 1952 – first mammary–coronary anastomosis
- 1953 – first successful experimental coronary artery bypass operation
- 1954 – first head transplant

All of the surgical procedures listed above were carried out on warm-blooded animals (non-human). Between 1963 and 1965, he also assembled the world's first collection of living human organs for future surgical use.

== Death ==
Demikhov died at the age of 82 on November 22, 1998, as the result of an aneurysm, in his small apartment on the outskirts of Moscow. Although he had received various honors later in life, including a USSR State Prize, the true value of Demikhov's experiments was not acknowledged by Russia until the year of his death, when he was awarded the Order of Merit for the Fatherland, 3rd class, shortly before he died.

== See also ==
- Experiments in the Revival of Organisms – Russian documentary that depicts similar experiments carried out in the Soviet Union

== Bibliography ==
- Shumacker, H. B. (October 1994). "A surgeon to remember: notes about Vladimir Demikhov". The Annals of Thoracic Surgery. 58 (4): 1196–1198. doi:10.1016/0003-4975(94)90496-0. PMID 7944786.
- Cooper, D. K. (June 1995). "Vladimir Demikhov". The Annals of Thoracic Surgery. 59 (6): 1628. doi:10.1016/0003-4975(95)96259-i. PMID 7771869.
- Konstantinov, I. E. (April 1998). "A mystery of Vladimir P. Demikhov: the 50th anniversary of the first intrathoracic transplantation". The Annals of Thoracic Surgery. 65 (4): 1171–1177. doi:10.1016/s0003-4975(97)01308-8. PMID 9564962.
- Demichow, W. P. (1963). Die experimentelle Transplantation lebenswichtige Organe. Berlin: Verlag Volk und Gesundheit.
- Demichov V. P. (1962). Experimental transplantation of vital organs. Authorized translation from the Russian. Translated by Basil Haigh. New York: Consultants Bureau.
