= Snegov =

Snegov (Russian: Сне́гов) is a Russian surname. Notable people with the surname include:

- Alexei Snegov (1898–1989), Old Bolshevik and Soviet politician
- Sergey Snegov (1910–1994), Soviet science fiction writer
