= Charles Claude Guthrie =

American physiologist

- Born: September 26, 1880; Gilmore, Missouri
- Died: June 17, 1963 (aged 82); Columbia, Missouri
- Education: University of Missouri (M.D. 1901); University of Chicago (Ph.D. 1908)
- Known for: Blood reactions, head transplants
- Scientific career
- Fields: Physiology
- Institutions: Washington University in St. Louis; University of Pittsburgh
- Academic advisors: Alexis Carrel

Charles Claude Guthrie (September 26, 1880 – June 16, 1963) was an American physiologist.

== Early life and education ==
He was born at Gilmore, Missouri. He graduated (M.D.) from the University of Missouri in 1901 and (Ph.D.) from the University of Chicago in 1908.

== Career ==
Guthrie taught physiology while engaged in advanced studies, and was professor of physiology and pharmacology at Washington University School of Medicine in 1906–1909 and at the University of Pittsburgh School of Medicine after 1909. He was author of Blood-Vessel Surgery and its Applications (1912) and of contributions on blood reactions and alterations, resuscitation, cerebral and other anæmias, isolated and ungrafted tissues, and sutures and anastomosis of blood vessels.

Guthrie collaborated in his work on vascular surgery with French physician Alexis Carrel, who won the 1912 Nobel Prize in Physiology or Medicine. Arguments were made that the primary credit for this work should have gone to Guthrie rather than Carrel. However, Guthrie's head transplant experiments likely prevented his Nobel Prize candidacy status.

== Death ==
Guthrie died in Columbia, Missouri, on June 16, 1963.
