= Humans as Gods =

1966 novel by Sergey Snegov

- 1982 Lenizdat hardback edition
- Novels: The Galactic Reconnaissance; The Invasion of Perseus; The Reverse Time Loop
- Author: Sergey Snegov
- Original title: Люди как боги
- Country: Russia, USSR
- Language: Russian
- Genre: Science fiction Space opera
- Publisher: Lenizdat
- Published: 1966, 1968, 1977
- Media type: Print (hardback and paperback)

Humans as Gods (Russian: Люди как боги, translit. Lyudi kak bogi) is a 1966–1977 science fiction trilogy by Soviet author Sergey Snegov. Despite being initially intended as a parody on space opera, mythological and religious cliché, the novels embody a complex set of ideas on the fundamental principles of the world's structure and development, and the directions of the civilizations' possible future. While a number of plot elements seem to be taken from general science fiction concepts, the resulting story may be considered unique in many ways. The central conflicts are based on the assumption that the face of super-civilization must be defined by its comprehension of the Universe as a whole: the understanding of its elementary, most basic (and thus most deeply and widely operative) laws.

== Creation and publication history ==
Snegov's career in literature was a hard one: being subjected to repression during Stalin's rule, he remained under informal suspicion in later life. The very idea behind Humans as Gods was to write something publishable, a book nobody would object to. The author initially deemed this work as a light reading, merely another spacefaring adventure. The planned novel's design differed from the mainstream Western science fiction, as Snegov put it, in just one feature: being optimistic about the future. Nevertheless, the first book had been rejected by four publishers before being printed (which was unusual for the Soviet fiction publishers).

The first novel was published under the title Humans as Gods in 1966 by Lenizdat, in the storybook collection The Hellenic Mystery by different authors. The second novel appeared in a collection likewise: it was printed in 1968 by the same publisher. At that time the second novel has been bearing the name Straitened Amid Stars, with The Invasion of Perseus being the name of its first part. Curiously, the collection as a whole was titled The Invasion of Perseus. The novels got their final names in the 1971 edition by Kaliningrad Publishing House, when they were published in one volume as a dilogy Humans as Gods.

The third novel was written after a considerable amount of time and published in 1977 by Lenizdat. It was not until 1982 that the trilogy has been finally printed in one volume (by the same publisher). Snegov has cut the text significantly for this edition; the first two books were revised most dramatically, their size being reduced by more than 15% (mostly at the expense of the non-action scenes, alien civilizations' depictions and details revealing the heroes' characters). As a result, some of Snegov's fans put special interest in the original, unabridged versions of the text.

=== Translations ===
The novels have not been published in English yet.

The most comprehensive list of the Russian, German, Polish, Japanese and Hungarian editions can be found at the Russian Wikipedia article on the novels.

== Novels and plot ==
=== The Galactic Reconnaissance (1966) ===
At the beginning of the narration, the main character Eli Gamasin, engineer of suns, travels to the world Ora where a conference of various star people is being held. Being at the conference rumours about a yet unknown advanced civilisation of "Galaxians" are unveiled. These seem to be kept in a cruel war with even more mysterious enemies, the "Destroyers".

To gather some knowledge about these races a squadron of star cruisers is sent out to the Pleiades cluster. Arriving there at the world Sigma humans and their allies become witness of the cruel war crimes of the "Destroyers" and become a combatant party. One of the humans, Eli's best friend André, is being captured and displaced by the Destroyers, which are capable of being invisible. During a battle amidst the star field the humans are able to destroy many cruisers of the destroyers. André remains missing.

The expedition decides to travel to the Chi Persei cluster where the homestead both of the Galaxians and the Destroyers seems to be. Warned by the Galaxians the human expedition force enters the cluster and is being trapped. The Destroyers turn out to be able to bend the three-dimensional space at random force. The captain of the last remaining cruiser attacks and annihilates a star fortress of the Destroyers and breaks free. The ability of the humans to annihilate matter to space is the tactical advantage in that case.

=== The Invasion of Perseus (1968) ===
After the first expedition to the Chi Persei cluster a newly formed invasion force of human kind and their allies sets of. Their goals are to find the still missing André, to establish a permanent contact to the Galaxians and to confine the Destroyers. Eli Gamasin, now admiral of the expedition force, is commanding a fleet of powerful ships. First attempts to penetrate the barriers of the star cluster fail but finally the Destroyers are able to trap three ships and to take the crews of these cruisers including Eli Gamasin and his family as prisoners of war.

Orlan, a high ranking commander, takes the humans to a concentration camp and delivers Eli to the Highest Destroyer. There Eli takes his chances and in a broadcast debate he praises the values and way of life of human kind and their allies. Thus he is able to acquire many Destroyers as allies, Orlan and the controlling brain (Dreamer) of one of the star fortresses (Third Golden planet) are among them. They support the humans to get into contact with Galaxians and to form an alliance against the Highest Destroyer. In a last battle humans and Galaxians wipe out the Highest Destroyer's fleet.

=== The Reverse Time Loop (1977) ===
Many decades after the events presented in the first two books mankind is searching for a powerful, mysterious civilization: the Ramires. Rumours locate them at the center of the galactic core, doing there unspeakable things. An expedition group sent there years ago had been extinguished. Now a new fleet with Eli Gamasin as head of the science department is armed and crewed. On their way they come under attack. They encounter a time ship of the arachnoid Aranes. Their last surviving crew member Oan becomes part of the expedition but soon is to be revealed a saboteur and spy of the Ramires. Entering the galactic core the remaining expedition faces the problems of a distorted space-time-continuum and is doomed. Eventually they are able to escape, carrying the knowledge of the far-beyond Ramires doing mysterious but necessary things in the galactic core.

== Futuristic Earth ==
The trilogy events take place in the latter half of the 6th century N.E., where N.E. stands for the New Era, a novel age of the human history, counting years from the 2001 A.D., when the humanity has united into a single society.

== Characters ==
Most individual characters come from the four main groups: Earthlings, Starspeople, Galaxians and Ruinators/Malignians (later known as "Demiurges"). The third book introduces one or two persons probably belonging to the ancient and mysterious race of Ramirs, whose nature may be completely alien to us planet-dwellers.

=== Earthlings ===
- Eli Gamazin — the main character of the narrative. An alumnus of a school in the Himalayas, a slowpoke and a joker. In the first part of the novel, he is his older sister Vera's secretary and a member of the crew of the Space Devourer. In the second, he is the admiral of the Human Flotilla sent to Perseus, Commander of the Joint Fleets of Humans and Galaxians. In the third, he is the scientific leader of the expedition to the nucleus of the Galaxy.
- André Scherstyuk — an alumnus of a school in the Himalayas, very close friend of Eli. An idea man. Likes to change his appearance. Married to Zhanna, who would later give birth to his son Oleg. In the first part, he composed the symphony "Harmony of the Stellar Spheres", where, in addition to the music, the listener was influenced by changes in temperature and gravity. The symphony failed miserably. Took part in the expedition to Pleiades, where he was kidnapped by the Destroyers. In the second part, where Eli and his friends are captured by the Destroyers, Andre appears to the captives totally insane. However, he quickly recovers and helps the captives regain their freedom, and when the humans take over one of the space warp stations, Andre takes over the leadership of the station.
- Pavel Romero — historian and historiographer. Dressed in the fashion of the 19th and 20th centuries, he wears an espagnolo beard and walking stick. He knows the history of the Earth very well. Fiancé (then husband) of Vera Gamazina, Eli's sister.
- Lusin — an alumnus of a school in the Himalayas, a biologist at the New Forms Institute who bred mythical animals by influencing the genes of real animals. For example, he created pegasi from horses and dragons from lizards. Lusin speaks sort of hieroglyphics, with very short phrases of two or three words, and can only be understood by those who know him well. Very reverent towards all living things. Died in the third part of the novel on Arania while trying to prevent a mass suicide action by the locals.
- Vera Gamazina — Eli's older sister and Pavel's fiancée (later wife). Member of the Grand Council. A very beautiful woman, always stunning in anger. Loves to stand at the window for so long, with her head tilted back and her hands on the back of her head. Died a natural death before the beginning of the narration of the third part.
- Mary Glahn — Eli's wife (from the second part of the novel). A woman who does not shine with beauty, but she is pretty. She is passionate about botany and microbiology and has bred a group of metal-eating bacteria that produce hydrogen and oxygen. She gave birth to a son, Astr.
- Olga Trondike — an alumnus of a school in the Himalayas, mathematician, captain of a spaceship, and commander of a reserve squadron. All her life she loved Eli Gamazin, but married Leonid Mrava. In her free time she likes to calculate.
- Leonid Mrava — an alumnus of a school in the Himalayas, captain of a spaceship, a very abrupt and impetuous man. Fiancé (then husband) of Olga Trondike. Died in the third part.
- Allan Cruise — an alumnus of a school in the Himalayas, captain of a spaceship. A very tall man with a loud voice. According to Eli Gamazin, Allan has only two states: he is either jubilant or indignant. He died in the third part along with Leonid.
- Eduard Kamagin — A member of the crew of the starship Mendeleev (assistant captain), launched 400 years ago, attacked by the Destroyers. Because of Einstein's time dilation observed at near-light speeds, it became possible to meet his descendants. The captain of one of the spaceships. A man of small stature.
- Vasily Groman — a member of the crew of the starship Mendeleev (navigator).
- Oleg Scherstyuk — André Sherstyuk's son, looks a lot like his father. Commander of the star squadron sent on an expedition to the Core. Falls in love with Irina.
- Irina Trondike — The daughter of Olga Trondike and Leonid Mrava. In character and appearance she takes after Leonid. A member of the expedition to the Core, Ellon's assistant, with a crush on her boss. After creating the collapsan she sent herself to the future. Further fate is unknown.
- Astr — son of Eli Gamazin and Mary Glahn, looks a bit like his father. Infected the Third Destroyer planet with life by a solution of the metal-eating microorganisms created by Mary. Died at the age of about 9 from the effects of high gravity on the Third Planet.

=== Aliens ===
- Trub — a four-winged angel of enormous proportions, a boomer who considers himself a Knyaz. He came from the ninth planet of the Flame B system in the Hyades. After the confrontation with Eli, he calmed down a bit, and when all the participants left Ora, he wished to fly not home, but to Earth to the people. He is also very friendly with Eli and Lusin. He proved himself to be an excellent fighter in battle. He was killed in the Core when the expedition was struck by the cancer of time.
- Fiola — a very beautiful snake with an almost human head, native to Vega. A participant in the star conference on Ora. Eli falls in love with Fiola, but then quickly cools down.
- Orlan — destroyer (demiurge). Destroyer of the First Imperial Category, nobleman, close to the Great Destroyer, one of the first to realize that the philosophy of the Destroyers is false, and actively helped Eli in the second part of the story. He accompanied Eli on his expeditions to the planets of the Galactians. In the third part he helped to get Ellon to complete his tasks.
- Ellon — destroyer (demiurge). One of the most ingenious minds, modernized the weapons that create non-Euclidean space, and installed them on the ships of the fleet in the third part of the narrative. Also developed the collapsar, a time machine. Mentally unbalanced (according to Galaxian Gratius, due to excess artificiality in his body). Cancer of time aggravates Ellon's unbalance, and he dies while attempting to escape into the past.
- Gyges — destroyer, the Invisible One. A swaggering and friendly character. He is, like all invisible men, an excellent executor of orders, but too quick to make decisions. He was one of the first, along with Orlan, to join Eli and adopt his philosophy (in the second part of the story). He also, along with Orlan, accompanied Eli on his expeditions to the galactic planets. In the third part was mainly engaged in reconnaissance.
- Tigran — Galaxian. Made first contact with the earthlings.
- Gratius — Galaxian. Negotiator, xenosociologist, negotiated with the Earthlings on behalf of the Galaxian civilization. Later took part in the expedition to the Core, acting as an agent of peace, and after the disappearance of Tramp took over control of the ships and the time machine. Rather easily tolerated the time cancer.
- Brain — a living isolated brain of Galaxian origin. Used by Destroyers to control gravity units on the Third Planet. Actively assisted Gamazin in the confrontation with the Destroyers. With Eli's consent, he settled into the body of the dragon Thunderer (after the latter's brain was damaged in the battle for the Third Planet) to enjoy the bodily sensations, and named himself Tramp. But when the Thunderer's body grew old in the third part of the novel, he was returned to his former state. He was the one who managed the ships until the SUMs (Small Universal Machines – a kind of analog of computers, control all machinery and provide, thanks to a complex system of sensors, telepathic communication between people) were damaged. Supposedly he died because Ellon hated him and sent him back in time.
- Oan — A creature camouflaged as an Aran, the inhabitant of the Arania planet. Later it turns out that Oan is a Ramirian spy.
