= Gilmore, Missouri =

Unincorporated community in Missouri, U.S.

Coordinates: 38°48′37″N 90°48′22″W

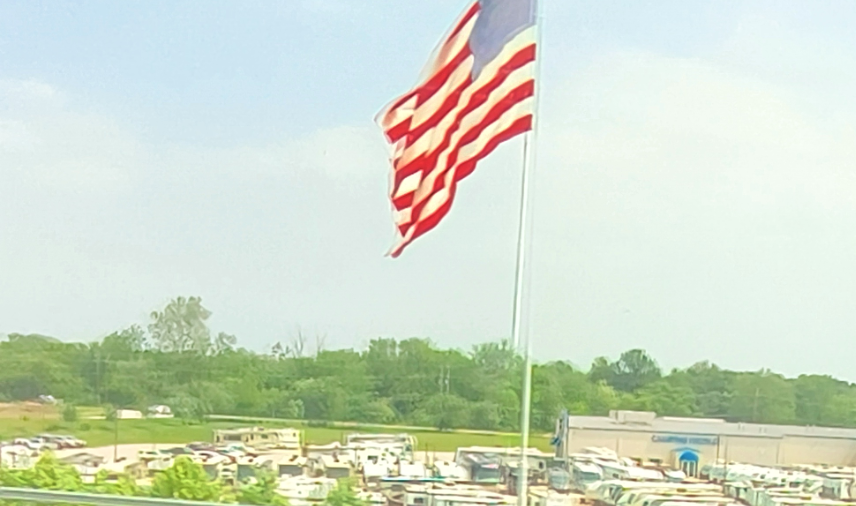
Gilmore in 2025

Gilmore is an unincorporated community in St. Charles County, in the U.S. state of Missouri.

== History ==
A post office called Gilmore was established in 1884, and remained in operation until 1959. Gilmore was named for Thomas Gilmore, an early settler who was one of a company to march against the British at Rock Island and who was killed by Indians.

== Notable people ==
- Charles Claude Guthrie (1880–1963), physiologist and surgeon
