= Head transplant =

Experimental surgical operation

A head transplant or full body transplant is an experimental surgical operation involving the grafting of one organism's head onto the body of another. In many experiments, the recipient's head has not been removed, but in others it has been. Experimentation in animals began in the early 1900s. As of 2026, no lasting successes have been achieved.

== Medical challenges ==
There are three main technical challenges. As with any organ transplant, managing the immune response to avoid transplant rejection is necessary. Also, the brain is highly dependent on continuous flow of blood to provide oxygen and nutrients and remove waste products, with damage setting in quickly at normal temperatures when blood flow is cut off. Finally, managing the nervous systems in both the body and the head is essential, in several ways. The autonomic nervous system controls essential functions like breathing and the heart beating and is governed largely by the brain stem; if the recipient body's head is removed this can no longer function. Additionally each nerve coming out of the head via the spinal cord needs to be connected to the putatively corresponding nerve in the recipient body's spinal cord in order for the brain to control movement and receive sensory information. The risk of systematic neuropathic pain is high and as of 2017 had largely been unaddressed in research.

Of these challenges, dealing with blood supply and transplant rejection have been addressed in the field of transplant medicine generally, making transplantation of several types of organs fairly routine; however, as of 2017 in a field as common as liver transplantation around a quarter of organs are rejected within the first year and overall mortality is still much higher than the general population. The challenge of grafting the nervous system remained in early stages of research as of 2017.

== History ==
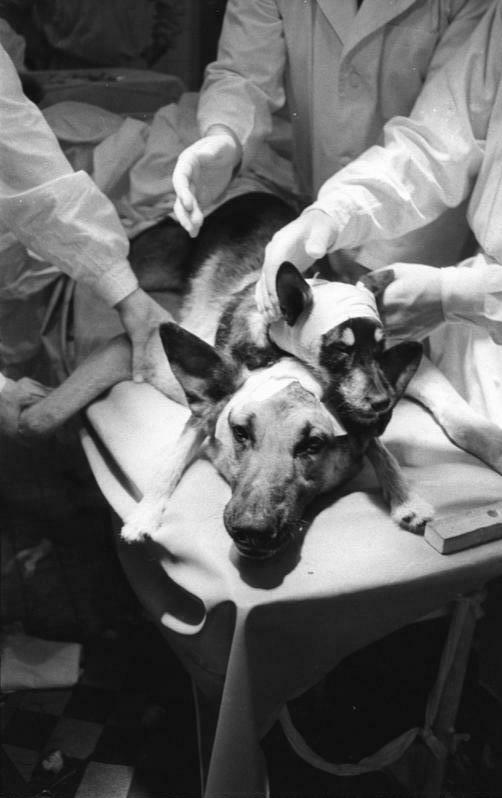
Transplantation of a dog-head performed in the USSR by Vladimir Demikhov on 1954

Alexis Carrel was a French surgeon who had developed improved surgical methods to connect blood vessels in the context of organ transplantation. In 1908, he collaborated with the American Charles Claude Guthrie to attempt to graft the head of one dog on an intact second dog; the grafted head showed some reflexes early on but deteriorated quickly and the animal was killed after a few hours. Carrel's work on organ transplantation later earned a Nobel Prize; Guthrie was probably excluded because of this controversial work on head transplantation.

In 1954, Vladimir Demikhov, a Soviet surgeon who had done important work to improve coronary bypass surgery, performed an experiment in which he grafted a dog's head and upper body including the front legs, onto another dog; the effort was focused on how to provide blood supply to the donor head and upper body and not on grafting the nervous systems. The dogs generally survived a few days; one survived 29 days. The grafted body parts were able to move and react to stimulus. The animals died due to transplant rejection.

In the 1950s and '60s, immunosuppressive drugs and organ transplantation techniques were developed that eventually made transplantation of kidneys, livers, and other organs standard medical procedures.

In 1965, Robert J. White did a series of experiments in which he attempted to graft only the vascular system of isolated dog brains onto existing dogs, to learn how to manage this challenge. He monitored brain activity with EEG and also monitored metabolism, and showed that he could maintain high levels of brain activity and metabolism by avoiding any break in the blood supply. The animals survived between 6 hours and 2 days. In 1970, he did four experiments in which he cut the head off of a monkey and connected the blood vessels of another monkey head to it; he did not attempt to connect the nervous systems. White used deep hypothermia to protect the brains during the times when they were cut off from blood during procedure. The recipient bodies had to be kept alive with mechanical ventilation and drugs to stimulate the heart. The grafted heads were able to function - the eyes tracked moving objects and it could chew and swallow. There were problems with the grafting of blood vessels that led to blood clots forming, and White used high doses of immunosuppressive drugs that had severe side effects; the animals died between 6 hours and 3 days after the heads were engrafted. These experiments were reported and criticized in the media and were considered barbaric by animal rights activists. There were few animal experiments on head transplantation for many years after this.

In 2012, Xiaoping Ren published work in which he grafted the head of a mouse onto another mouse's body; again the focus was on how to avoid harm from the loss of blood supply; with his protocol the grafted heads survived up to six months.

In 2013, Sergio Canavero published a protocol that he said would make human head transplantation possible. In 2016, he announced his plans to do the procedure on Valeriy Spiridonov, a disabled Russian software engineer suffering from spinal muscular atrophy, who volunteered for the surgery. Canavero claimed that there was a 90% chance of success. In the proposed procedure, a body would be donated from a brain-dead living patient. However, Spiridonov later cancelled his participation after getting married and having his first child.

In 2015, Ren published work in which he cut off the heads of mice but left the brain stem in place, and then connected the vasculature of the donor head to the recipient body; this work was an effort to address whether it was possible to keep the body of the recipient animal alive without life support. All prior experimental work that involved removing the recipient body's head had cut the head off lower down, just below the second bone in the spinal column. Ren also used moderate hypothermia to protect the brains during the procedure.

In 2016, Ren and Canavero published a review of attempted as well as possible neuroprotection strategies that they said should be researched for potential use in a head transplantation procedure; they discussed various protocols for connecting the vasculature, the use of various levels of hypothermia, the use of blood substitutes, and the possibility of using hydrogen sulfide as a neuroprotective agent.

On November 17, 2017, Canavero announced at a press conference in Vienna that a team led by Ren at Harbin Medical University had rehearsed the procedure on two human cadavers over 18 hours. He presented no evidence at the conference, saying a paper would follow within days. The paper described the surgical steps for joining a head to a body at the cervical level and said it confirmed the "surgical feasibility" of the operation. Because the cadavers had no circulation and no nervous system function to restore, commentators noted that the exercise tested only dissection and fixation, and demonstrated nothing about whether a living recipient could survive or recover function.

Canavero said an operation on a living patient was imminent, but none was performed. After Spiridonov withdrew, the project had no candidate. Canavero left Molinette Hospital in Turin, where he had worked for 22 years, and as of 2026 continued as an independent investigator without institutional backing or funding, appealing to private financiers to support his work.

== Ethics and popular opinion ==
Arthur Caplan, a bioethicist, opined in 2017, "Head transplants are fake news. Those who promote such claims and who would subject any human being to unproven cruel surgery merit not headlines but only contempt and condemnation."

Robert J. White became a target for protestors because of his head transplantation experiments. One interrupted a banquet in his honor by offering him a bloody replica of a human head. Others called his house asking for "Dr. Butcher". When White testified in a civil hearing about Sam Sheppard's murder case, lawyer Terry Gilbert compared White to Dr. Frankenstein. The People for the Ethical Treatment of Animals described White's experiments as "epitomizing the crude, cruel vivisection industry".

In general, the field of transplantation medicine has been met with resistance and alarm from some quarters as advances have been made; Joseph Murray, who performed the first kidney transplant in 1954, was described as doing something unnatural or as playing God. These continued as other organs were transplanted, but perhaps became sharpest as hand transplants and face transplants emerged in 1998 and 2005 respectively, as each of these are visible, personal, and social in ways that internal organs are not. The medical ethics of each of these procedures was extensively discussed and worked out before clinical experimental and regular usage began.

With regard to head transplantation, there had been little formal ethical discussion published in the literature and little dialogue among stakeholders as of 2017; the plans of Canavero were well ahead of society's and the medical establishment's readiness or acceptance. There was no accepted protocol for conducting the procedure to justify the risk to the people involved, methods of obtaining informed consent were unclear, especially for the person whose body would be used; issues of desperation render the truly informed consent of a head donor questionable. With regard to societal costs, the body of a person willing to be an organ donor can save the lives of many people, and as of 2017, the supply of tissues and organs from people willing to be organ donors did not meet the medical need of recipients; the notion of an entire donor body going to one other person was difficult to justify at that time. Basic legal issues were also unclear as of 2017 with regard to whether only one or both of the people involved in a head transplantation would have any legal rights in the post-procedure person.

The most appropriate initial form of the procedure was also unclear as of 2017. Because grafting the head onto the spinal cord was not possible at that time, the only feasible procedure would be one where the head was only connected to the blood supply of the donor body, leaving the person completely paralyzed, with the accompanying limited quality of life and high societal cost to maintain.

The psychological results of the procedure were unclear as well. While concerns were raised about whether recipients of a face transplant and their social circle would have difficulty adjusting, studies as of 2017 had found that disruptions had been minimal. But no transplant had ever been performed where the entire body of an individual is unfamiliar at the conclusion of the procedure, and one of the few documents discussing the ethics in the biomedical literature, a letter to the editor of a journal published in 2015 foresaw a high risk of insanity as a result of the procedure.

Popular opinion about Canavero's plans for head transplantation has been generally negative as of 2017. Many of these criticisms focus on the state of technology and the timeframe in which Canavero says he will be able to successfully conduct the procedure.

== In popular culture ==
=== Literature ===
- Professor Dowell's Head (1925), science-fiction novel by Alexander Belyaev, a mad scientist performs head transplants on bodies stolen from the morgue, and reanimates the bodies.
- Arthur Nagan or "Gorilla-Man", Marvel Comics scientist character whose head was transplanted onto a gorilla's body.
- NOGGIN (2014) by John Corey Whaley; Travis Coates wakes up after undergoing a head transplant after five years of being cryogenically frozen.
- Dog Man (2016) After a dog and a cop are injured in an explosion, a nurse transplants the dog's head onto the cop's body.

=== Film and television ===
- The Brain That Wouldn't Die (1962), science-fiction/horror film
- The Incredible Two-Headed Transplant (1971), science fiction/horror film
- The Thing with Two Heads (1972), science fiction film
- Professor Dowell's Testament (1984), Soviet film based on the A. Belyaev story mentioned above
- "Donor" (1999), an episode of The Outer Limits
- The X-Files: I Want to Believe (2008), science fiction film
- In May 2024, a realistically animated rendition of a head transplant became a viral video on social media

=== Video games ===
- B.J. Blazkowicz, protagonist of the Wolfenstein series, has his head transplanted on to a genetically engineered body in Wolfenstein II: The New Colossus (2017).

== See also ==
- Experiments in the Revival of Organisms
- Isolated brain
- Medical ethics
- Organ transplantation
