= Ren Xiaoping =

Chinese orthopedic surgeon (born 1961)

Ren Xiaoping (Chinese: 任晓平; born 1961) is a Chinese orthopedic surgeon, and is most well-known for being part of the team that achieved the first hand transplant in China.

As of 2016, he was a controversial figure as he announced his intent to perform a human head transplant, an operation that has never been done before. Many criticized Ren, stating that the surgery would be impossible.

== Education and early work ==
Ren attended the Harbin Medical University in Harbin, China, and received his M.D. in 1984. From 1996 to 2000, he continued his education, performing research relating to anatomy and hand surgery. During this period, specifically on January 25, 1999, the first hand transplant was performed on Mathew Scott. Ren was an influential figure in this achievement.

== Head transplant ==
=== Mouse experiments ===
Prior to his announcement of attempting the first human head transplant, Ren had spent years performing the same surgery on mice. However, the results of most of the experiments ended with the subject dying. One such experiment involved 40 Kunming mice, and another 40 C57 wild type mice. Out of 80 mice selected, only 18 survived, and only for three hours. In those three hours, the mice were capable of breathing and acting normally. Ren has also stated to have practiced the procedure on human cadavers, but has yet to reveal any more information.

=== Criticism ===
Because of Ren's lack of success, many are skeptical of his idea. One example is that of Dr. Huang Jiefu, who commented that a spine's neurons can't be reconnected once the spine is cut. Many also criticize the procedure for being too expensive, and requiring too many people.

Some also claim that such a surgery is unethical. Dr. Hunt Batjer, past-President of the Congress of Neurological Surgeons, has stated in reference to the surgery that he "would not allow anyone to do it to me as there are a lot of things worse than death."

=== Human testing ===
In 2015, Valery Spiridonov announced he would volunteer as the body recipient for the transplant. Spiridonov suffers from musculoskeletal atrophy. He claimed that he had no plans of backing out of the surgery. He later backed out after marrying and having a son with his new wife.

In November 2017, Sergio Canavero claimed that a team led by Ren had performed the first successful human head transplant. This procedure did not involve Spiridonov. To date, no evidence has been presented of a successful procedure.

Spiridonov has expressed hope that Ren and Canavero would provide more transparency into "what went wrong in China and why."
