= Sergei Brukhonenko =

Soviet scientist (1890-1960)

- Серге́й Брюхоненко
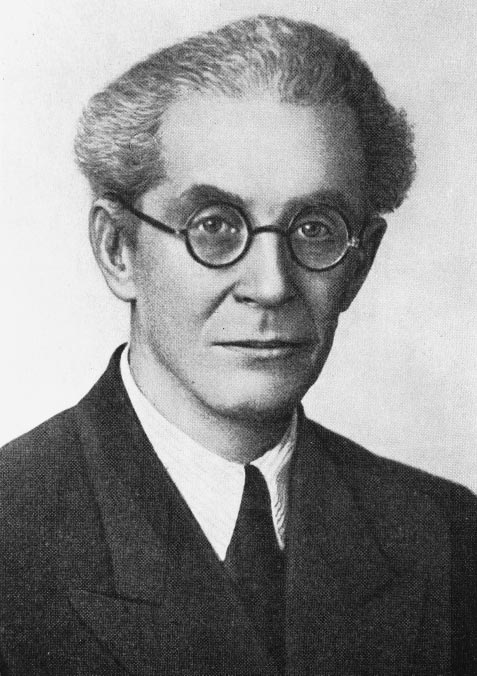
- Brukhonenko in 1942
- Born: Sergei Sergeevich Brukhonenko; 30 April 1890; Kozlov, Tambov Governorate, Russian Empire
- Died: 20 April 1960 (aged 69)
- Awards: Lenin Prize

Sergei Sergeevich Brukhonenko (Note: Also transliterated as Bryuchonenko, Bruchonenko, Briukhonenko, Brykhonenko, Briukhanenko, Brychonenko, or Brjukhenenko.) (Russian: Серге́й Серге́евич Брюхоненко; 30 April 1890 – 20 April 1960) was a Soviet physician, biomedical scientist and technologist during the Stalinist era. Brukhonenko's research was vital to the development of open-heart procedures in Russia. He was one of the leaders of the Research Institute of Experimental Surgery, where Professor Alexander Vishnevsky performed the first Soviet open-heart operation in 1957.

Brukhonenko is primarily remembered for his development of the autojektor, one of the first heart and lung machines. The device was used to mixed results in a series of experiments with dogs beginning in the 1920s, as seen in the 1940 film Experiments in the Revival of Organisms. While there is some speculation today that the film is a re-staging of the procedures, the experiments themselves were well documented, and resulted in Brukhonenko being posthumously awarded the prestigious Lenin Prize.

== Early life ==
Brukhonenko was born on 30 April 1890 in the Russian town of Kozlov (known today as Michurinsk) into the family of a civil engineer. His created his first invention, self-designed and self-constructed bicycle, as a teenager.

== Career ==
Brukhonenko received his secondary education in Saratov, later joining the medical faculty of Moscow State University. He was drafted to serve in World War I in 1914, witnessing numerous combat injuries while assigned to the active army as a junior physician. He returned in 1917 to work in Moscow. During 1919 to 1926, Brukhonenko was the assistant professor at the Department of Clinical Pathology and Therapy in Moscow.

Brukhonenko's work in creating the autojektor, an early heart–lung machine, was displayed in a series of experiments with canines in 1939. These experiments are shown in the 1940 documentary film Experiments in the Revival of Organisms, directed by David Yashin.

Film of his reviving dead animals

The film is commonly suspected to be a reconstruction of real (if more modest) experiments, as none of the more scientifically questionable procedures are shown in full-frame shots. Additionally, the film's claim that dogs had been drained of blood and revived to live for years after was found to be only partially true, as according to the lab records the dogs survived for only days after the experiment, not years as the film claimed, and suffered serious brain damage.

Brukhonenko led the Institute of Experimental Surgical Devices and Instruments from 1951 to 1958. Following his experiments with canines, Brukhonenko was granted permission to continue his autojektor experiments with human cadavers. However, these experiments failed to produce encouraging results, resulting in Brukhonenko losing favor with Soviet leadership.

Brukhonenko died 20 April 1960 from rectal cancer.

== Legacy ==
in 1965, 5 years after his death, Brukhonenko was posthumously awarded the Lenin Prize for advancing knowledge of artificial blood circulation and laying the ground for future advancements.

His experiments laid the groundwork for further advancements in cardiac surgery in the Soviet Union.

== Decorations ==
- 3rd class of the Order of Saint Stanislaus (1914)
- 3rd class of the Order of Saint Anna (1915)
- Lenin Prize (1965, posthumously)
