= Kulikovsky, Volgograd Oblast =

Kulikovsky Куликовский
- Khutor
- Location within Volgograd Oblast Location within Russia
- Coordinates: 50°50′N 42°32′E
- Country: Russia
- Region: Volgograd Oblast
- District: Novonikolayevsky District
- Time zone: UTC+4:00

Kulikovsky (Russian: Куликовский) is a rural locality (a khutor) and the administrative center of Kulikovskoye Rural Settlement, Novonikolayevsky District, Volgograd Oblast, Russia. The population was 1,166 as of 2010. There are 40 streets.

== Geography ==
Kulikovsky is located 21 km southeast of Novonikolayevsky (the district's administrative centre) by road. Yaryzhenskaya is the nearest rural locality.
