= Sergio Canavero =

Italian researcher of head transplantation (born 1964)

- Born: 1964 (age 61–62); Turin, Italy
- Education: University of Turin
- Children: 2
- Awards: Honorary professor (Harbin Medical University)
- Scientific career
- Fields: Neurosurgery

Sergio Canavero (born 1964) is an Italian neurosurgeon known for his controversial claims about the near-term feasibility of head transplantation—the grafting of a head onto a new body—in humans. He made headlines in 2015 when he publicly announced that he would perform such a procedure on a human in two years' time. In 2017, Canavero and colleagues performed a rehearsal head transplantation procedure on two cadavers, and he announced his intention to "imminently" perform the operation on a live human patient paralyzed from the neck down.

== Life and education ==
Canavero grew up in Turin, northern Italy near France, to a poor family. He has described his upbringing as rough.

He enrolled for medicine at the University of Turin at age 18 and graduated. In the mid-1980s, he began to train as a functional neurosurgeon at the University Hospital in Turin before being employed at the same venue. He worked for 22 years as a neurosurgeon (including being the Director of the Turin Advanced Neuromodulation Group) until his contract was terminated in February 2015 due to increased opposition to his work from multiple quarters.

After his termination from the University Hospital, he was inducted as an honorary professor by Harbin Medical University in Harbin, a city in the Chinese countryside, near Russia.

Canavero is married and has two children. He is a keen practitioner of jujitsu and has been described as an idiosyncratic personality.

== Surgical career ==
Canavero has completed studies on central pain syndrome and Parkinson's disease. He started his work on head transplantation in 1982. He attracted media attention in 2015 after claiming to be very near towards the successful execution of a human head transplant and detailed out a rough version of the proposed surgical procedure. Numerous neuroscientists and surgeons had rejected the claims. Initially, he was notably against any experimentation on animals.

The first person to volunteer for Canavero's procedure for head transplantation was Valery Spiridonov, a Russian computer programmer who has spinal muscular atrophy, a muscle-wasting disease. However, Spiridonov later cancelled his participation after getting married and having his first child.

After his termination of contract in 2015, he had collaborated with Xiaoping Ren of Harbin Medical University, who were already working on a similar focus.

=== Monkey ===
In January 2016, Canavero and his team issued a press release wherein they claimed to have performed a successful head transplant on a monkey who supposedly survived the procedure without any neurological injury and was kept alive for 20 hours. However, the spinal cord was not re-joined and the monkey was unconscious throughout. The release also claimed that they were experimenting on human cadavers prior to their scheduled human head transplant around Christmas 2017.

The claims were widely criticized and dismissed. Arthur Caplan, a bioethicist, criticized their press releases prior to publishing in peer-reviewed journals and remarked it to be "science through public relations". Thomas Cochrane, a neurologist at Harvard Medical School's Centre for Bioethics, also criticized the press release for generating unwarranted excitement and commented that the operation was majorly about "publicity rather than the production of good science".

=== Human ===
In 2017, Canavero and colleagues performed a rehearsal human head transplant on two cadavers at Harbin Medical University.

Writing in The Guardian in 2017, neuroscientist Dean Burnett noted that head transplantation procedures present challenges that are beyond the ability of currently known science and that Canavero has "offered no feasible explanation or science for his claims to be able to overcome these hurdles". Regarding Canavero's work, Caplan wrote: "Head transplants are fake news. Those who promote such claims and who would subject any human being to unproven cruel surgery merit not headlines but only contempt and condemnation."
