= Experiments in the Revival of Organisms =

1940 Soviet documentary film

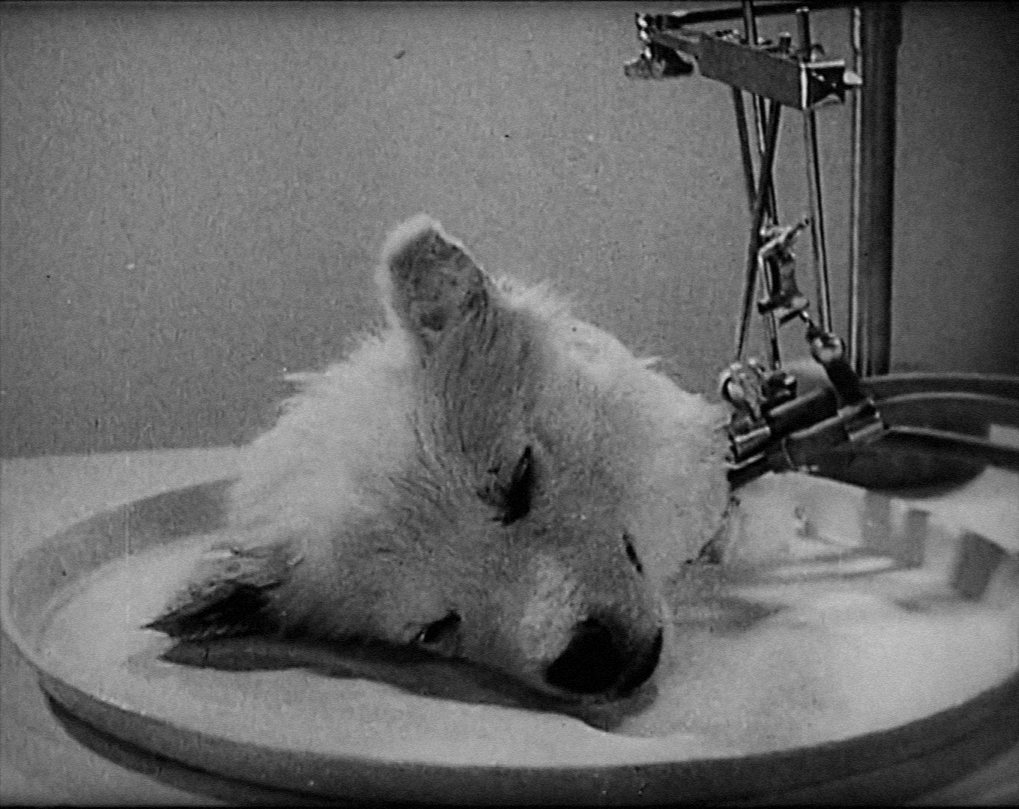
- Frame from the film showing the dog's head attached to Brukhonenko's autojektor
- Directed by: David Yashin
- Written by: Sergei Brukhonenko
- Starring: Sergei Brukhonenko
- Narrated by: J. B. S. Haldane (English)
- Cinematography: Yekaterina Kashina
- Animation by: Alexander Prozorov
- Production company: Moscow Studio of Technical Films
- Release date: 1940
- Running time: 19 minutes (Russian); 20 minutes (English)
- Country: Soviet Union
- Languages: Russian; English

Experiments in the Revival of Organisms (Russian: О́пыты по оживле́нию органи́зма) is a 1940 documentary film directed by David Yashin that purports to document Soviet research into the resuscitation of clinically dead organisms. The English version of the film begins with an introduction given by British scientist J. B. S. Haldane.

The operations in the film, as well as the design of the heart-lung machine demonstrated in it, the autojektor, were done by Sergei Brukhonenko, whose work is said to have led to the first operations on heart valves. While the experiments shown are generally considered to have taken place, the legitimacy of the film itself is controversial.

== Synopsis ==
Full English version of the film

The film depicts and discusses a series of medical experiments. The English version of the film begins with British scientist J. B. S. Haldane appearing and discussing how he had personally seen some of the procedures carried out in the film at an all-Russian physiological congress. The Russian version lacks this explanation.

The experiments start with a dog's heart, attached to a set of tubes to serve as substitutes for the great vessels. Using a system to supply it with blood, the heart beats in the same manner as if it were inside a living organism. The film then shows a lung in a tray, which is operated by bellows to oxygenate the blood being sent to the heart.

The audience is then shown the autojektor, a heart-lung machine, composed of a pair of linear diaphragm pumps, venous and arterial, exchanging oxygen with a water reservoir. This machine is then seen supplying the severed head of a dog with oxygenated blood. The dog's head is presented with external stimuli, to which it responds – its ears twitch when a loud noise is made; when drops of citric acid are applied to the mouth, the dog licks its lips several times, etc. According to the film, "the isolated head lives on for hours".

Finally, another dog is brought to clinical death (depicted primarily through an animated diagram of lung and heart activity) by draining the blood from its body, triggering cardiac arrest. It is then left for ten minutes and connected to the autojektor, which gradually returns the blood into the animal's circulation. After several minutes of restoring blood flow, the heart fibrillates, then resumes its normal rhythm. Respiration resumes shortly thereafter and the machine is disconnected. Over the ensuing ten to twelve days, the dog recovers from the procedure and continues living a healthy life. According to the film, several dogs were brought back to life using this method including one which is the offspring of two parents who were also resuscitated using the machine.

== Background and production ==
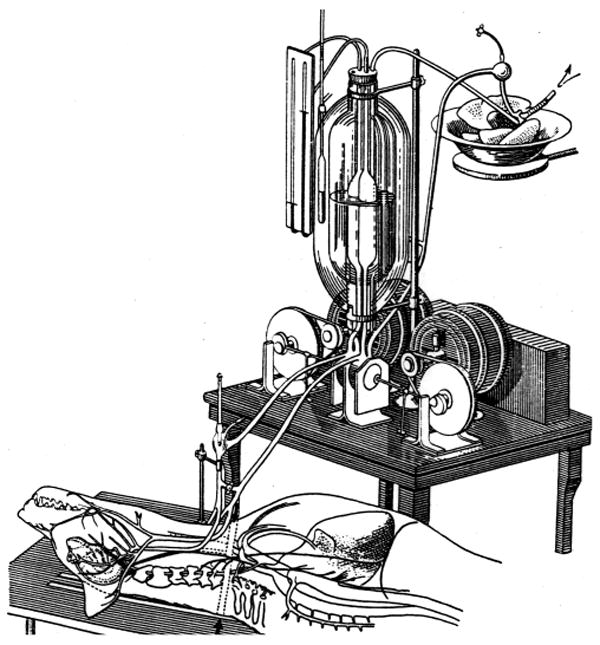
A patent diagram showing the setup of the procedure

In 1925, Sergei Brukhonenko demonstrated the autojektor to the Second Congress of Russian Pathologists in Moscow, where the device kept a dog's head alive for an hour and 40 minutes, while it displayed various reflexes. The next year he presented further research to the Second Congress of Soviet Physiologists in Leningrad.

The film was shot at the Institute of Experimental Physiology and Therapy in Moscow, and was directed by David Yashin; it was initially produced for Russian audiences using a script written by Brukhonenko. The operations in the film are credited to Brukhonenko and Boris Levinskovsky. It was one of three similar variant films cut from a larger project that Haldane was asked to supply commentary for in July 1942: one called Soviet Science Snipits; another shorter film composed of excised material from the first, featuring Lina Stern; and a third, initially given the English title Experiments in Bringing the Dead to Life, which was ultimately released as Experiments in the Revival of Organisms, and is the only one of the three which exists today. It is unclear what happened to the other two films.

== Reaction and legacy ==
The film was shown in London towards the end of 1942, and then in New York the next year, where it was screened to an audience of a thousand scientists at the Congress of American-Soviet Friendship. According to a contemporary report in Time magazine, "the scientific audience thought this work might move many supposed biological impossibilities into the realm of the possible."

George Bernard Shaw wrote of Brukhonenko's decapitation experiment: "I am even tempted to have my own head cut off so that I can continue to dictate plays and books without being bothered by illness, without having to dress and undress, without having to eat, without having anything else to do other than to produce masterpieces of dramatic art and literature." The Canadian Medical Association Journal, writing in 1959 in its listing of medical films, described the film as "well photographed and well arranged" and stated that it "holds interest throughout", writing that the "techniques are well recognized and the film is up-to-date" and recommended it for general scientific and professional medical audiences, although found it to be "inappropriate for the general public". Film historian Alisa Nasrtdinova, writing for the Gosfilmofond, praised the film, saying that the "shocking scenes" were shot with care.

The legitimacy of the film is controversial. Some commentators have suggested it is a recreation of actual experiments Brukhonenko had conducted, which were of a more modest scale. According to some scientists who claimed to have seen the experiments performed at the Third Congress of Physiologists of the USSR, the severed dog head only survived for a few minutes when attached to the artificial heart, as opposed to the hours claimed in the film, and showed only lingering reflex reactions. Another source of skepticism are the dogs drained of blood and then brought back to life, as after 10 minutes of death they should have experienced serious brain damage. According to the institute’s records, the dogs only survived for a few days, not several years as the film claimed.

The autojektor was a real device, one of the earliest heart-lung machines, developed by Brukhonenko for the artificial circulation of blood. His 1928 Soviet patent application for his invention included diagrams of his experiments on dogs. A later version of the autojektor, intended for use in humans, can be seen on display at the Museum of Cardiovascular Surgery at the Bakulev Scientific Center of Cardiovascular Surgery in Moscow. Brukhonenko's work is said to have laid the groundwork for the development of cardiac surgery in the Soviet Union. His autojektor is similar to modern extracorporeal membrane oxygenation machines, as well as the systems commonly used for renal dialysis in modern nephrology. Brukhonenko was posthumously awarded the prestigious Lenin Prize.

== See also ==
- Vladimir Demikhov
- Professor Dowell's Head
- Robert J. White
