= Sergey Snegov =

Soviet science fiction writer (1910–1994)

Sergey Snegov (Russian: Серге́й Алекса́ндрович Сне́гов) (20 August 1910, in Odessa – 23 February 1994), real surname Kozeryuk (Russian: Козерюк), was a Soviet science fiction writer. In 1985, he was awarded the Aelita Prize, the main Soviet prize for science fiction. His science fiction series Humans as Gods was popular in East Germany and in Poland.
