= Robert J. White =

American neurosurgeon (1926–2010)

- Born: Robert Joseph White; January 21, 1926; Duluth, Minnesota, U.S.
- Died: September 16, 2010 (aged 84); Geneva Township, Ashtabula County, Ohio, U.S.
- Education: University of St. Thomas (B.S., 1951); Harvard Medical School (M.D., 1953); University of Minnesota (PhD, Neurosurgery, 1962)
- Occupation: Neurosurgeon

Robert Joseph White (January 21, 1926 – September 16, 2010) was an American neurosurgeon, vivisectionist, and bioethicist best known for his work on hypothermia and his experiments with head transplants on mammals, including living monkeys.

== Early life ==
White was born January 21, 1926, raised in Duluth, Minnesota, by his mother and an aunt. His father was killed in combat while serving in the Pacific theater during World War II. White stated in a 2009 Motherboard interview that his interest in the human brain started in high school when his biology teacher admired his dissection of a frog cranium and told White that he should become a brain surgeon.

== Education and career ==
White began his undergraduate studies at the University of St. Thomas before entering the University of Minnesota Medical School in 1949; he later transferred to Harvard Medical School in 1951, where he earned his medical degree cum laude in 1953. White had ten children with his wife, Patricia Murray, a nurse he met at Peter Bent Brigham Hospital while completing his surgical internship and residency. A devout Roman Catholic, Dr. White was a member of the Pontifical Academy of Sciences. He attended mass regularly and prayed before performing surgeries.

Throughout his career, White performed over 10,000 surgical operations and authored more than 900 publications on clinical neurosurgery, medical ethics and health care. He received honorary doctorates from John Carroll University (Doctor of Science, 1979), Cleveland State University (Doctor of Science, 1980), Walsh University (Doctor of Humane Letters, 1996) and the University of St. Thomas (Doctor of Sciences, 1998). White received invitations worldwide to speak, lecture and share his medical expertise. He was a consultant to the Burdenko Neurosurgery Institute in Moscow and was the only foreign member of both Russian and Ukrainian Academies of Medical Science. He lectured extensively in the U.S., Russia, China and Europe. White also became an adviser to Pope John Paul II on medical ethics. He established the Vatican's Commission on Biomedical Ethics in 1981 after his appointment to the Pontifical Academy of Sciences. Under White's leadership, the Commission influenced the church's stance on brain death and in vitro fertilization.

He nicknamed himself Humble Bob. White founded Cleveland General Metropolitan Hospital's (now MetroHealth) neurosurgery department. Many people know him for being a leading target for protesters. A PETA activist went as far as to call him "Dr. Butcher" and described his experiments as "epitomizing the crude, cruel vivisection industry." For 40 years, White was a neurological surgery professor at Case Western Reserve University medical school, a well-liked teacher and an acclaimed surgeon. He was one of the best known neurosurgeons in the United States, notably for his minimally successful head transplant experiments on rhesus monkeys.

== Research ==
In 1970, after a long series of preliminary experiments, White performed a transplant of one monkey head onto the body of another monkey. Because the surgery included severing the spine at the neck, the subjects were paralyzed from the neck down. After the surgery, because the cranial nerves within the brain were still intact and nourished by the circulatory system from the new body, the monkey could still hear, smell, taste, eat and follow objects with its eyes.

Ultimately, immune rejection caused the monkey to die after nine days. Jerry Silver, an expert in regrowing severed nerves, called White's experiments on monkeys, "fairly barbaric."

During the 1990s, White planned to perform the same operation on humans and practiced on corpses at a mortuary. He hoped he could do head transplant surgery on the physicist Stephen Hawking and the actor Christopher Reeve. The possible continuation of White's work in head transplantation research and application was examined in the neurosurgical literature in 2013 by Italian neurosurgeon Sergio Canavero; the feasibility of spinal cord reconstruction and cephalo-spinal linkage in humans received support in 2014 from a German study (which does not address directly the actual topic of head transplantation.)

== Death ==
White died at his home in Geneva, Ohio, on September 16, 2010, at age 84 after suffering from diabetes and prostate cancer.

== Sources ==
- The Frankenstein Factor
- VBS.tv documentary on YouTube
- Journalist and author Oriana Fallaci wrote "The Dead Body and the Living Brain" (Look, 26, 1967, pgs 99–105) based on White's experimentation on primates; in turn, this was included in the 2010 book edited by philosopher Tom Regan and theologian Andrew Linzey, Other Nations: Animals in Modern Literature.
