= List of ambassadors of China to Poland =

Coordinates: 52.250724°N 21.002400°E

Ambassador of China to Poland
- Incumbent; Xu Jian since 1 August 2012
- Inaugural holder: Frank W. Chinglun Lee
- Formation: 13 May 1933; 93 years ago

The ambassador of China to Poland is the official representative of the People's Republic of China to the Republic of Poland.

== List of representatives ==
Diplomatic agrément/Diplomatic accreditation	Ambassador	Chinese language zh:中国驻波兰大使列表	Observations	Premier of the People's Republic of China	List of heads of state of Poland	Term end
September 22, 1930			The governments of the Republic of China and Poland discussed the exchange of envoys.	T. V. Soong	Ignacy Mościcki	
August 15, 1931	Wang Kuang-Ch'i	王广圻	Courtesy name: Chi-Fu (* 1878 in Wusih, Kiangsu); From 1912 to 1914 he was Minister in Belgium.; From 1915-27, minister to Italy, then Holland.; 1930, director of general affairs, ministry of Interior. September, In 1931 he was appointed minister to Poland and Czechoslovakia, but never arrived in Warsaw.; In 1933 he became Vice-chairman, treaty commission, ministry of foreign affairs.	Chiang Kai-shek	Ignacy Mościcki	May 13, 1933
May 13, 1933	Frank W. Chinglun Lee (Li Jinlun Li Chin-lun)	zh:李锦纶 (外交官)	(1886 – 1956)	Wang Jingwei	Ignacy Mościcki	June 25, 1934
June 25, 1934	Chang Hsin-hai	zh:张歆海		Wang Jingwei	Ignacy Mościcki	December 21, 1936
January 7, 1937	Wei Chenzu	zh:魏宸组	Wei Chenzu (1885 -), male, the word East, Hubei Province Jiangxia County August 1942)	Chiang Kai-shek	Ignacy Mościcki	October 21, 1938
October 21, 1938	sv:Wang Jingqi	zh:王景岐	On December 18, 1930 sv:Wang Jingqi succeeded Yi as Director of the Labor University (国立劳动大学 National Labour University (Laodong daxue), Kiangwan, Shanghai), who arrived on campus to take office as the second and last president of Labor University on December 18, 1930. Wang, a French-educated diplomat, was formerly China's minister to Belgium, and later, after his presidency at Labor University, became minister to Sweden and Poland.	H. H. Kung	Ignacy Mościcki	August 18, 1940
August 18, 1940			September 1, 1939 German occupation of Poland after the Polish government in exile in Paris, and later moved to London, August 18, 1940 Embassy in Warsaw was closed	Chiang Kai-shek	Władysław Raczkiewicz	
September 15, 1939			Due to the German occupation of Poland, the Polish government in 1940 moved to London. The Chinese Embassy also changed to London.	H. H. Kung	Bolesław Wieniawa-Długoszowski	
January 31, 1942	de:Wunz King	zh:金问泗	Embassy in the Netherlands and the Embassy in Poland	Chiang Kai-shek	Władysław Raczkiewicz	March 19, 1945
June 24, 1942			The legation was upgraded to an embassy.	Chiang Kai-shek	Władysław Raczkiewicz	
March 19, 1945	de:Wunz King	zh:金问泗		Chiang Kai-shek	Bolesław Bierut	October 11, 1949
October 7, 1949			establishment of diplomatic relations between the People's Republic of China and the Republic of Poland	Zhou Enlai	Bolesław Bierut	
June 8, 1950	en:Peng Mingzhi	zh:彭明治		Zhou Enlai	Bolesław Bierut	April 1, 1952
September 1, 1952	en:Zeng Yongquan	zh:曾涌泉		Zhou Enlai	Aleksander Zawadzki	January 1, 1955
March 1, 1955	Wang Bingnan	zh:王炳南		Zhou Enlai	Aleksander Zawadzki	April 1, 1964
April 30, 1964	en:Wang Guoquan	zh:王国权		Zhou Enlai	Edward Ochab	July 1, 1970
August 1, 1970	Yao Guang	zh:姚广		Zhou Enlai	Józef Cyrankiewicz	December 1, 1971
April 1, 1972	Liu Shuqing	zh:刘述卿		Zhou Enlai	Henryk Jabłoński	January 1, 1977
April 1, 1977	Li Zewang	zh:李则望		Hua Guofeng	Henryk Jabłoński	December 1, 1982
April 1, 1983	Yv Hongliang	zh:于洪亮		Zhao Ziyang	Henryk Jabłoński	January 1, 1985
April 1, 1985	Wang Jinqing	zh:王荩卿		Zhao Ziyang	Wojciech Jaruzelski	July 1, 1987
July 1, 1987	Pei Yuanying	zh:裴远颖		Li Peng	Wojciech Jaruzelski	April 1, 1992
April 1, 1992	Liu Yanshun	zh:刘颜顺（刘彦顺）		Li Peng	Lech Wałęsa	October 1, 1995
October 1, 1995	Chen Shize	zh:陈世泽		Li Peng	Lech Wałęsa	February 1, 1998
March 1, 1998	Chen Di	zh:陈棣		Zhu Rongji	Aleksander Kwaśniewski	October 1, 2000
November 1, 2000	Zhou Xiaopei	zh:周晓沛		Zhu Rongji	Aleksander Kwaśniewski	July 1, 2003
September 1, 2003	Yuan Guisen	zh:苑桂森		Wen Jiabao	Aleksander Kwaśniewski	June 1, 2007
August 1, 2007	Sun Rongmin	zh:孙荣民		Wen Jiabao	Lech Kaczyński	May 1, 2010
June 1, 2010	Sun Yuxi	zh:孙玉玺		Wen Jiabao	Bronisław Komorowski	August 1, 2012
August 1, 2012	Xu Jian	zh:徐堅		Wen Jiabao	Bronisław Komorowski	

== See also ==
- China–Poland relations
