= List of ambassadors of China to Afghanistan =

Ambassador of China to Afghanistan
- 中国驻阿富汗大使
- National emblem of China
- Incumbent; Zhao Xing since September 2023
- Ministry of Foreign Affairs of the People's Republic of China; Embassy of China, Kabul
- Appointer: The president pursuant to a National People's Congress Standing Committee decision

The ambassador of China to Afghanistan is the official representative of the People's Republic of China to Afghanistan.

== List of representatives ==
Name	Took office	Left office
Ding Guoyu	June 1955	July 1958
Hao Ting	August 1958	May 1965
Chen Feng	July 1965	January 1969
Xie Bangzhi	July 1969	January 1973
Gan Yetao	February 1973	June 1976
Huang Mingda	September 1977	October 1979
Sun Yuxi	April 2002	January 2005
Liu Jian	January 2005	February 2007
Yang Houlan	March 2007	February 2009
Zheng Qingdian	March 2009	March 2011
Xu Feihong	March 2011	August 2013
Deng Xijun	September 2013	October 2015
Yao Jing	October 2015	October 2017
Liu Jinsong	January 2018	July 2019
Wang Yu	November 2019	August 2023
Zhao Xing	September 2023	Incumbent

== See also ==
- Ambassadors of China
