= Yang Houlan =

Chinese diplomat

Yang Houlan (Chinese: 杨厚兰; born May 1956) was a Chinese diplomat. He was born in Enshi, Hubei. He was a graduate of Wuhan University and George Washington University. He was Ambassador of the People's Republic of China to Afghanistan (2007–2009), Nepal (2011–2013) and Myanmar (2013–2015). He was Ambassador for Korean Peninsula Affairs of the Ministry of Foreign Affairs of the People's Republic of China (2009–2011).

| Preceded by Liu Jian | Chinese Ambassador to Afghanistan; 2007–2009 | Succeeded by Zheng Qingdian |
| Preceded by Chen Naiqing | Ambassador for Korean Peninsular Affairs of the Ministry of Foreign Affairs of China; 2009–2011 | Succeeded by Wu Dawei as special representative for Korean Peninsula Affairs |
| Preceded by Qiu Guohong | Chinese Ambassador to Nepal; 2011–2013 | Succeeded by Wu Chuntai |
| Preceded by Li Junhua | Chinese Ambassador to Myanmar; 2013–2015 | Succeeded by Hong Liang |
