= PRC-US Ambassadorial Talks =

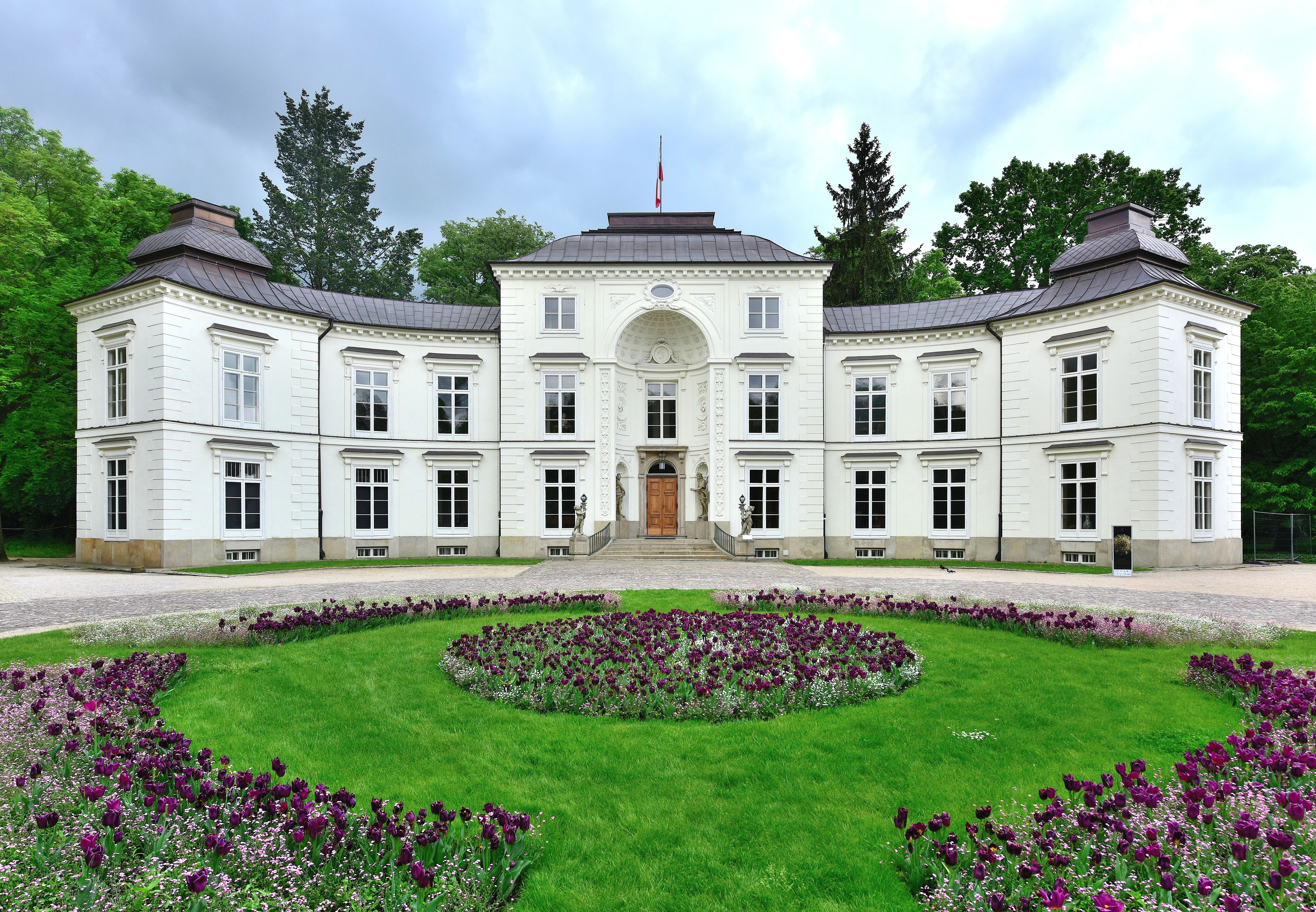
Myślewicki Palace, the meeting place in Poland.

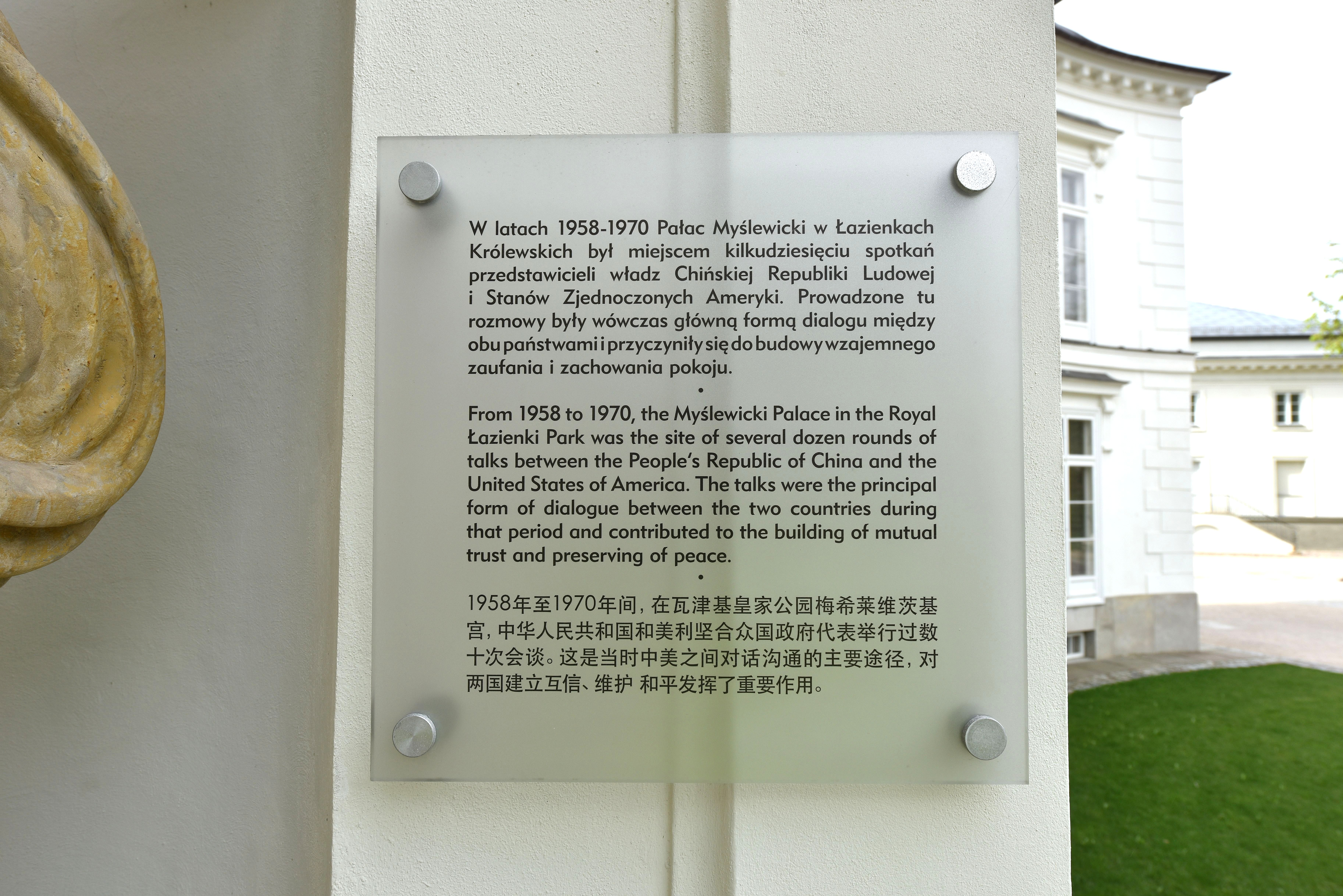
Plaque commemorating the talks at the entrance to the palace.

PRC-US Ambassadorial Talks (Chinese: 中美大使级会谈) were a series of meetings between the ambassadors of People's Republic of China and the United States from 1954 to 1970 when there were no diplomatic relations between the two countries.

The first was held in Geneva, Switzerland, August 1st, 1955, between Wang Bingnan, PRC ambassador to Poland and U. Alexis Johnson, US ambassador to Czechoslovakia. Since 1958, the meetings began to be held in Myślewicki Palace, Warsaw, Poland between Wang Guoquan, PRC ambassador to Poland and Jacob D. Beam, United States Ambassador to Poland. In 1961, Wang Bingnan rejected Beam's suggestion that China consider allowing privately sent food parcels from America. After 1970, US began to contact PRC formally and substituted the meetings with other channels.

== See also ==
- China–United States relations
  - Ping-pong diplomacy
  - Shanghai Communiqué
  - Joint Communiqué on the Establishment of Diplomatic Relations
- History of China–United States relations
