= List of ambassadors of China to El Salvador =

Coordinates: 13.693477°N 89.239224°W

Ambassador of China to El Salvador
- Incumbent; Ou Jianhong since 17 December 2018
- Inaugural holder: Yorkson C. T. Shen
- Formation: 1935; 91 years ago

The ambassador of China to El Salvador is the official representative of the People's Republic of China to the Republic of El Salvador.

== List of representatives ==
Diplomatic agreement/Diplomatic accreditation	Ambassador	Chinese language zh:中国驻萨尔瓦多大使列表	Observations	List of premiers of the Republic of China	President of El Salvador	Term end
1933			The governments in Nanjing and San Salvador established diplomatic relations	Chiang Kai-shek	Maximiliano Hernández Martínez	
1935	Yorkson C. T. Shen	zh:沈觐鼎	1935-1942 with residence in Panama.	Chiang Kai-shek	Maximiliano Hernández Martínez	
January 1944	Tu Yun-tan	涂允檀	with residence in Panama. PANAMA In April, 1942, the Ch'nese Government appointed Tu Yun-tan Minister to Panama. He was succeeded by Cheng Chen-yu in April 1948.	Chiang Kai-shek	Andrés Ignacio Menéndez	April 1948
April 1948	Cheng Chen-yu	郑震宇	with residence in Panama con codesigancion para San Salvador pero nunca llegó.	Weng Wenhao	Salvador Castaneda Castro	
August 1953	Kiding Wang	zh:王季徵	with residence in Panama. En 1954 fue ministro en el Líbano.	Chen Cheng	Óscar Osorio Hernández	July 1957
July 1957	Xu Ze	徐泽	(*1904): On 9 January 1955 he became Chinese Ambassador to Ecuador.	Yu Hung-Chun	José María Lemus López	November 1958
November 1958	Liu Tseng-hua	刘增华		Chen Cheng	José María Lemus López	January 1961
1 June 1961	Liu Tseng-hua	刘增华	embjador	Chen Cheng	Miguel Ángel Castillo	August 1964
August 1964	Kiang Yi-sheng	江易生	1902	Yen Chia-kan	Eusebio Rodolfo Cordón Cea	August 1967
August 1967	Mih Sih-tsung	zh:宓锡宠	Hasta 1967 fu embajador en Bolivia	Yen Chia-kan	Fidel Sánchez Hernández	September 1970
September 1970	Milton Jan-tze Shieh	zh:谢然之	(*25 May 1913 27 June 2009 en Laguna Woods, California)	Yen Chia-kan	Fidel Sánchez Hernández	February 1975
February 1975	Lien Chan	zh:连战		Chiang Ching-kuo	Arturo Armando Molina	December 1976
December 1976	Wu Chun-tsai	zh:吴俊才	(25 December 1921 to 26 August 1996) Director of the Kuomintang Department of Culture and Information	Chiang Ching-kuo	Arturo Armando Molina	February 1978
February 1978	Luo You Lun	zh:罗友伦	Lo Yu-lun (*4 February 1912 to 25 August 1994)	Sun Yun-suan	Carlos Humberto Romero	December 1985
December 1985	Andrew J. P. Shen	沈仁標		Yu Kuo-hwa	José Napoleón Duarte	December 1996
December 1996	Bing F. Yen	顏秉璠		Lien Chan	Armando Calderón Sol	June 2001
August 2001	Hou Ping-Fu	侯平福		Tang Fei	Francisco Flores Pérez	2004
2005	en:Hou Ching-shan	侯清山		Hsieh Chang-ting	Antonio Saca	2006
2006	Carlos S.C. Liao	廖世傑		Su Tseng-chang	Antonio Saca	
May 2011	Jaime Hsin-Tung Chen	陳新東		Wu Den-yih	Mauricio Funes	October 2013
October 2013	Andrea Sing Ying Lee	李新穎		Jiang Yi-hua	Mauricio Funes	October 2016
October 2016	Florencia Miao-hung Hsie	謝妙宏		Lin Chuan	Salvador Sánchez Cerén	Aug 2018 End of diplomatic ties
21 August 2018			The governments in Beijing and San Salvador established diplomatic relations.	Li Keqiang	Salvador Sánchez Cerén	
17 December 2018	Ou Jianhong	欧箭虹		Li Keqiang	Salvador Sánchez Cerén	
