= List of ambassadors of China to Italy =

The ambassador of China to Italy is the official representative of the People's Republic of China to Italy.

== List of representatives ==
Name (English)	Name (Chinese)	Tenure begins	Tenure ends	Note
Shen Ping	沈平	April 1971	26 June 1974	
Han Kehua	韩克华	September 1974	17 June 1977	
Wang Guoquan	王国权	September 1977	27 August 1978	
Zhang Yue	张越	February 1979	6 October 1982	
Lin Zhong	林中	March 1983	January 1986	
Du Gong	杜攻	March 1986	January 1990	
Li Baocheng	李宝城	February 1990	June 1994	
Chen Baoshun	陈宝顺	29 December 1993	May 1994	
Wu Minglian	吴明廉	July 1994	April 1999	
Cheng Wendong	程文栋	May 1999	March 2005	
Dong Jinyi	董津义	March 2005	February 2008	
Sun Yuxi	孙玉玺	March 2008	March 2010	
Ding Wei	丁伟	April 2010	17 July 2013	
Li Ruiyu	李瑞宇	December 2013	May 2019	
Li Junhua	李军华	May 2019	July 2022	
Jia Guide	賈桂德	January 2023		

== See also ==
- China–Italy relations
