= Ding Xuesong =

Chinese diplomat and politician (1918–2011)

- 丁雪松
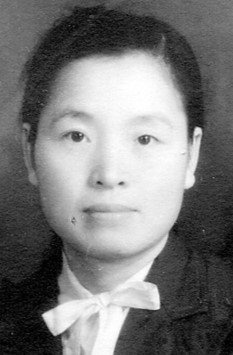
- Ding in 1947

Chinese Ambassador to the Netherlands
- In office 1979–1981
- Preceded by: Chen Xinren
- Succeeded by: Guo Jie

Chinese Ambassador to Denmark and Iceland
- In office 1982–1984
- Preceded by: Qin Jialin (Denmark) and Chen Feng (Iceland)
- Succeeded by: Chen Luzhi

Personal details
- Born: 27 May 1918 Mudong town, Ba County, Chongqing, Sichuan, China (present-day Banan District, Chongqing, China)
- Died: 29 May 2011 (aged 93)
- Party: Chinese Communist Party
- Spouse: Zheng Lücheng (1941–1976)
- Children: 1 (daughter)

Ding Xuesong (Chinese: 丁雪松; 27 May 1918 – 29 May 2011) was a Chinese diplomat and politician who was China's first female ambassador, serving as ambassador to the Netherlands from 1979 to 1981 and then to Denmark and Iceland from 1982 to 1984.

== Early life ==
Born on 1918 in Ba County in Chongqing, she graduated from Wende Girls' High School and Sichuan Provincial Girls' Vocational School in Chongqing, and later worked at a bank. In November 1937, she joined the Chinese Communist Party (CCP) and in January 1938, she arrived in Yan'an and enrolled in the Anti-Japanese Military and Political University.

In July 1939, when the Chinese Women's University in Yan'an opened, Ding joined the advanced research class and served as the vice president of the student union. In October 1941, was called back to Yan'an to participate in the preparatory work for the Shaanxi-Gansu-Ningxia Border Region Consultative Council and was appointed as the secretary to Li Dingming, the vice chairman of the Shaanxi-Gansu-Ningxia Border Region government.

== Diplomatic career ==
In 1947, Ding moved to North Korea and was appointed within the Korean Workers' Party as the secretary general of the Central Overseas Chinese Affairs Committee of the party and worked in the propaganda department of the Hwanghae Province Party Committee. In 1948, she became the Chairwoman of the North Korean Overseas Chinese Federation and the representative of the Chinese business delegation in Pyongyang.

In September 1949, she was tasked with establishing the Pyongyang branch of Xinhua News Agency and became the director of the branch in early 1950. She returned to China in September of the same year following the outbreak of the Korean War and in 1951, she was transferred to the International Department of the Chinese Communist Party.

In 1952, Ding transferred to the International Activities Guidance Committee of the Central Committee of the CCP, serving as the director of the office. In 1971, transferred to the Chinese People's Association for Friendship with Foreign Countries as the secretary general and later as the vice president of the association.

In 1979, she succeeded Chen Xinren as the Chinese ambassador to the Netherlands, becoming the first female ambassador of the People's Republic of China. During her tenure as ambassador, she oversaw the facilitation of Dutch Prime Minister Dries van Agt's visit to China in 1980, making it first visit by a sitting Dutch Prime Minister to China. In 1982, she was appointed as the ambassador to Denmark and Iceland. As ambassador to Denmark, Ding was instrumental in Carlsberg Brewery's investment in the Beijing Huadu Brewery, at the time China's most modern. For her efforts, she was nicknamed the "beer ambassadress".

Xuesong retired in 1994 and in 2007, she donated ten cultural relics, including a commemorative bowl from the Danish Foreign Ministry, to the Chinese Museum of Women and Children in Beijing.

== Personal life ==
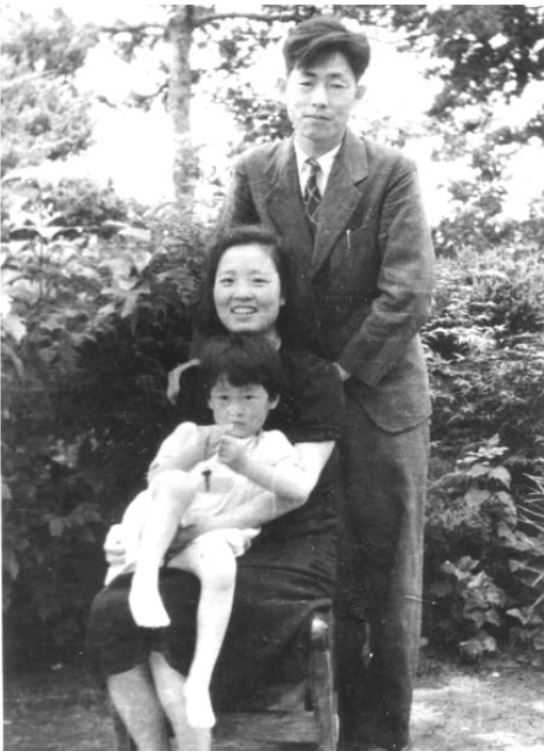
Ding with her husband Zheng Lücheng and daughter Zheng Xiaoti (1948)

Ding married Korean-born composer Zheng Lücheng in 1941. She accompanied him to North Korea in 1945, but appealed to Zhou Enlai to request Kim Il Sung's permission for them to return to China in 1950. The couple had a daughter named Zheng Xiaoti.

Ding died on 29 May 2011, at the age of 93.

Diplomatic posts
Preceded by Chen Xinren	Ambassador of China to the Netherlands; 1979–1981	Succeeded by Guo Jie
Preceded by Qin Jialin (Denmark), Chen Feng (Iceland)	Ambassador of China to Denmark and Iceland; 1982–1984	Succeeded by Chen Luzhi
