= List of ambassadors of China to San Marino =

Chinese Ambassador to San Marino
- Incumbent; Li Ruiyu since 1 November 2013
- Inaugural holder: Su Sheng
- Formation: 4 September 1971; 55 years ago

The Chinese ambassador to San Marino is the official representative of the People's Republic of China to the Republic of San Marino.

The ambassador is also accredited to the Italian Republic.

== List of representatives ==
Diplomatic agrément/Diplomatic accreditation	Ambassador	Chinese language zh:中国驻圣马力诺大使列表	Observations	Premier of the People's Republic of China	Captains Regent	Term end
May 6, 1971			The governments in Beijing and the City of San Marino established diplomatic relations	Zhou Enlai	Luigi Lonfernini	
September 4, 1971	Su Sheng	苏生	Consul General	Zhou Enlai	Federico Carattoni	November 1, 1972
November 1, 1972	Wang Chuanbin	zh:王传斌	Consul General	Zhou Enlai	Rosolino Martelli	June 1, 1979
June 1, 1979	Huang Yuping	黄玉平	Consul General	Zhao Ziyang	Giuseppe Amici	March 31, 1983
March 31, 1983	Zhang Fadian	张法典	Consul General	Zhao Ziyang	Giuseppe Maiani	
1985	Yin Yufu	尹玉福	Consul General	Zhao Ziyang	Enzo Colombini	September 7, 1987
September 7, 1987	Zu Qinshun	祖钦舜	Consul General	Li Peng	Renzo Renzi	June 17, 1991
July 1, 1991			The Legation was upgraded from an Consulate General to an Embassy.	Li Peng	Domenico Bernardini	
July 1, 1991	Li Baocheng	zh:李宝城		Li Peng	Domenico Bernardini	June 1, 1994
July 1, 1994	Wu Minglian	zh:吴明廉		Li Peng	Alberto Cecchetti	April 1, 1999
May 1, 1999	Cheng Wendong	zh:程文栋		Zhu Rongji	Antonello Bacciocchi	March 1, 2005
March 1, 2005	Dong Jingyi	zh:董津义		Wen Jiabao	Fausta Morganti	February 1, 2008
March 1, 2008	Sun Yuxi	zh:孙玉玺		Wen Jiabao	Mirko Tomassoni	April 1, 2010
April 1, 2010	Ding Wei	zh:丁伟		Wen Jiabao	Marco Conti	July 1, 2013
November 1, 2013	Li Ruiyu	李瑞宇		Li Keqiang	Gian Carlo Capicchioni	

== See also ==
- China–San Marino relations
- China–Italy relations
