= List of ambassadors of China to Myanmar =

Coordinates: 16.788787°N 96.134640°E

Chinese Ambassador to Myanmar
- Incumbent; Hong Liang since July 2015
- Inaugural holder: Tu Yun-tan
- Formation: 24 October 1947; 78 years ago

The Chinese ambassador to Myanmar is the official representative of the People's Republic of China to the Republic of the Union of Myanmar.

== List of representatives ==
Diplomatic agrément/Diplomatic accreditation	Ambassador	Chinese language zh:中国驻缅甸大使列表	Observations	Premier of the People's Republic of China	List of presidents of Myanmar	Term end
September 9, 1947			The Chinese government announced to exchange ambassadors with Burma.	Chang Ch’ün	Hubert Rance	
October 24, 1947	Tu Yun-tan	涂允檀	(*1897 in Hubei; 1976): In 1937 he was Minister Honduras Chinese Ambassador to Honduras.; State responsibility for injuries to foreigners on account of mob violence, murder, and brigandage. Urbana, 111., 1929. 15 p. University of Illinois, In 1918 he graduated from the National University of Peking and taught Civics and English in Peking for several years.; In 1923 he came to the United States.	Chang Ch’ün	Hubert Rance	January 10, 1950
December 18, 1949			The Republic of China suspended diplomatic relations with the government of Myanmar and closed the Embassy on January 10, 1950.	Chang Ch’ün	Hubert Rance	January 10, 1950 On December 18, 1949,
June 8, 1950			The People's Republic of China formally established diplomatic relations with the Union of Myanmar and sent ambassadors to Myanmar.	Zhou Enlai	Sao Shwe Thaik	
September 5, 1950	Yao Zhongming	zh:姚仲明	*From August 1961 to April 1966 he was Chinese Ambassador to Indonesia.	Zhou Enlai	Sao Shwe Thaik	January 1958
April 1958	Li Yimeng	zh:李一氓	(*1903 - 1990), also known as Li Minzhi, Sichuan Province Pengxian East Street people. Politics, scholar, diplomat of the People 's Republic of China.: From March 1949 to November 1949 he was the first President of the Dalian University of Technology	Zhou Enlai	Win Maung	September 1963
September 1963	Geng Biao	zh:耿飚		Zhou Enlai	Ne Win	September 1967
March 1971	Chen Zhaoyuan	zh:陈肇源	(*1918): From March 1971 to May 1973 he was ambassador in Yangon.; From September 1973 to July 1976 he was Chinese Ambassador to Spain.; From September 1976 to December 1979 he was Chinese Ambassador to India.; From April 1983 to March 1985 he was Chinese Ambassador to the United Kingdom.	Zhou Enlai	Ne Win	May 1973
July 1973	Ye Chengzhang	zh:叶成章	From July 1973 - October 1977 he was ambassador in Yangon.; From December 1977 - October 1982 he was Chinese Ambassador to Malaysia.	Zhou Enlai	Ne Win	October 1977
November 1977	Mo Yanzhong	zh:莫燕忠	From November 1977 to April 1982 he was ambassador in Yangon.; From July 1982 to February 1984 he was Chinese Ambassador to the Philippines.	Hua Guofeng	Ne Win	April 1982
July 1982	Huang Mingda	zh:黄明达	From March 1973 to May 1977 he was Chinese Ambassador to Sri Lanka.; From September 1977 to October 1979 he was Chinese Ambassador to Afghanistan.; From July 1982 to June 1985 he was ambassador in Yangon.	Zhao Ziyang	San Yu	June 1985
May 1985	Zhou Mingji	zh:周明基	From May 1985 to June 19875 he was ambassador in Yangon.; From August 1987 to July 1991 he was Chinese Ambassador to Zambia.	Zhao Ziyang	San Yu	June 1987
August 1987	Cheng Ruisheng	zh:程瑞声	(*1934): From August 1987 to May 1990 he was ambassador in Yangon.; From September 1991 - November 1994 he was Chinese Ambassador to India.	Li Peng	San Yu	May 1990
July 1991	Liang Feng	zh:梁枫	From December 1983 - December 19864 he was Chinese Ambassador to Senegal.; From March 1988 to May 19914 he was Chinese Ambassador to Laos.; From July 1991 to August 1994 he was ambassador in Yangon.	Li Peng	Saw Maung	August 1994
September 1994	Chen Baoliu	zh:陈宝鎏	(*24 July 1938) BA daughter of the late Chen Gaobiao and Xi Zhilian.: in 1068 married to Shi Bingyi. 1968; one s.; From September 1994 to July 1997 she was ambassador in Yangon.; From August 1997 to August 2000 she was Chinese Ambassador to Singapore.	Li Peng	Than Shwe	July 1997
September 1997	Liang Dong	zh:梁栋		Li Peng	Than Shwe	January 2001
February 2001	Li Jinjun	zh:李进军	(*May 1956): Since March 2015 he is Chinese Ambassador to North Korea.; From October 2005 to October 2008 he was Chinese Ambassador to the Philippines.; From February 2001 to October 20057 he was ambassador in Yangon.	Zhu Rongji	Than Shwe	October 2005
October 2005	Guan Mu	zh:管木	From October 2005 to January 2009 he was ambassador in Yangon.; From February 2009 to August 2013 he was Chinese Ambassador to Thailand.	Wen Jiabao	Than Shwe	January 2009
January 2009	Ye Dabo	zh:叶大波	(*1956): From May 2004 to October 2006 he was Chinese Ambassador to Dominica.; From December 2006 to February 200 he was Chinese Ambassador to Sri Lanka.; From January 2009 to September 2010 he was ambassador in Yangon.	Wen Jiabao	Than Shwe	September 2010
December 2010	Li Junhua	zh:李军华	(* May 1956): From 2006 to 2008 he was Chinese Ambassador to Afghanistan.; From 2008 to 2011 headed the desk for the Korean Peninsula in the Ministry of Foreign Affairs.; From 2011 to 2013 he was Chinese Ambassador to Nepal.; From 2013 to 2015 he was Chinese Ambassador to Serbia.; Since September 2015 he is Secretary-General of the China-Japan-ROK Cooperation Secretariat.	Wen Jiabao	Than Shwe	March 2013
March 2013	Yang Houlan	zh:杨厚兰	From 2006 to 2008 he was Chinese Ambassador to Afghanistan.; From 2008 to 2011 he was Chinese Ambassador for Korean Peninsula Affairs in the Ministry of Foreign Affairs of the People's Republic of China; From 2011 to 2013 he was Chinese Ambassador to Nepal.	Li Keqiang	Thein Sein	June 2015
July 2015	Hong Liang	洪亮	(*September 1969)	Li Keqiang	Thein Sein	

- China–Myanmar relations
