= Eugeniusz Kwiatkowski Memorial =

Monument in Warsaw, Poland

Eugeniusz Kwiatkowski Monument
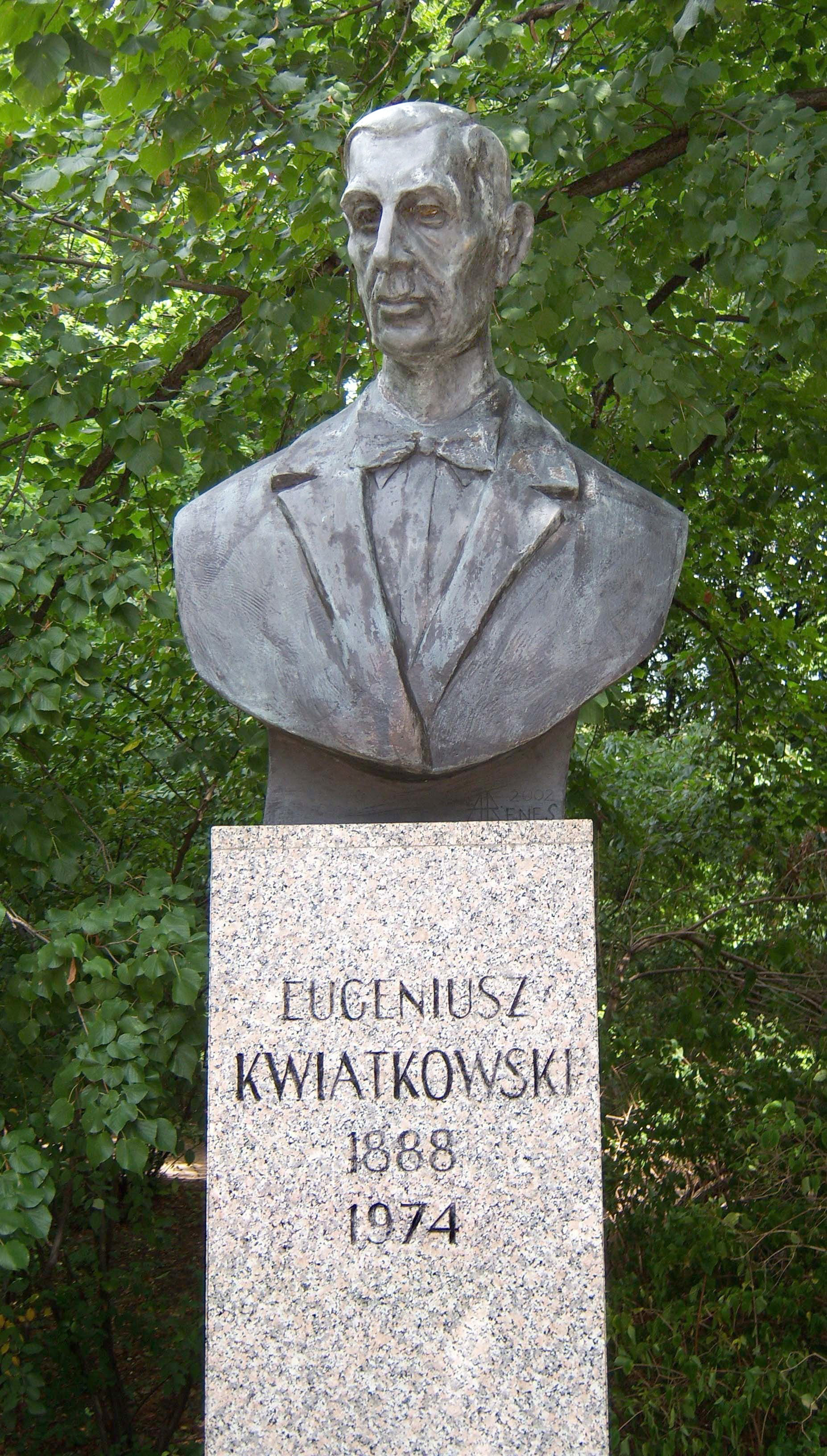
- The monument in 2009
- Interactive map of Eugeniusz Kwiatkowski Monument
- Location: Royal Baths Park, Downtown, Warsaw, Poland
- Coordinates: 52.215854°N 21.038409°E
- Designer: Andrzej Renes
- Type: Bust
- Material: Bronze
- Opening date: 24 June 2002
- Dedicated to: Eugeniusz Kwiatkowski

Eugeniusz Kwiatkowski Monument (Polish: Pomnik Eugeniusza Kwiatkowskiego) is a sculpture in Warsaw, Poland, located in the Royal Baths Park, within the neighbourhood of Ujazdów in the Downtown district. The monument has a form a bronze bust of Eugeniusz Kwiatkowski, a 20th-century politician, chemist, and economist, who was a minister of industry and trade, minister of treasury, and the deputy prime minister of Poland. The sculpture is placed outside the Myślewice Palace. It was designed by Andrzej Renes, and unveiled on 24 June 2002.

== History ==
The monument was dedicated to Eugeniusz Kwiatkowski, a 20th-century politician, chemist, and economist, who was a minister of industry and trade, minister of treasury, and the deputy prime minister of Poland. During his term, he initiated the creation of the Central Industrial Region and the expansion of the Port of Gdynia. The monument was designed by Andrzej Renes, and unveiled on 24 June 2002. It was part of the celebrations of the "year of Eugeniusz Kwiatkowski", designated as such by the Seym of Poland. The sculpture was unveiled by Ewa Kwiatkowska, Eugeniusz's daughter, and Tomasz Nałęcz, deputy marshal of the Seym. The monument was financed by Zbigniew Jakubas, a boss of the company Multico.

== Characteristics ==
The monument consists of a bronze bust of Eugeniusz Kwiatkowski, in a suit and with a bowtie, placed on a stone pedestal. It is located in the Royal Baths Park, within the neighbourhood of Ujazdów in the Downtown district. The sculpture is placed outside the Myślewice Palace, which used to be Kwiatkowski's residence while he was in office.
