= Jia Guide =

Chinese diplomat (born 1966)

Permanent Representative of China to the United Nations Office at Geneva and Other International Organizations in Switzerland
- Incumbent
- Assumed office 2025
- Preceded by: Chen Xu

Chinese Ambassador to Italy
- Incumbent
- Assumed office January 2023
- Preceded by: Li Junhua

Personal details
- Born: October 1966 (age 59)

Jia Guide (Chinese: 賈桂德; pinyin: Jiǎ Guìdé) is a diplomat of the People's Republic of China. Since January 2023, he is the current Ambassador to Italy and to San Marino.

== Career ==
Jia served as counselor of the Permanent Mission to the United Nations and other international organizations in Vienna, counselor of the Department of Treaties and Law of the Ministry of Foreign Affairs, and deputy director of the Department of Treaties and Law of the Ministry of Foreign Affairs. From July 2015 to May 2019, he served as Chinese Ambassador to Peru. Afterwards, he was appointed Director of the Treaty and Legal Department of the Ministry of Foreign Affairs. Since January 2023, he serves as the Ambassador to Italy and to San Marino. Since 2025, he became Permanent Representative of China to the United Nations Office at Geneva and other International Organizations in Switzerland.

| Preceded by Li Junhua | Chinese Ambassador to Italy and San Marino; January 2023–present | Succeeded by Incumbent |
| Preceded by Huang Minhui | Chinese Ambassador to Peru; July 2015–May 2019 | Succeeded by Liang Yu |
