= Chen Feng =

Chen Feng may refer to:

- Chen Feng (businessman) (born 1953), Chinese businessman
- Chen Feng (diplomat) (1916–1986), Chinese diplomat
- Chen Feng (fencer) (born 1980), Chinese fencer
- Chen Feng (table tennis) (born 1994), table tennis player from Singapore
- Chen Feng (volleyball) (born 1969), Chinese male volleyball player

== See also ==
- Fung Permadi (born 1967), also known as Chen Feng, Indonesian-Taiwanese badminton player
