= Hao Ting =

Hao Ting may refer to:

- Hao Ting (diplomat)
- Hao Ting (gymnast)
