= Prince Józef Poniatowski Monument (Ujazdów) =

Monument in Warsaw, Poland

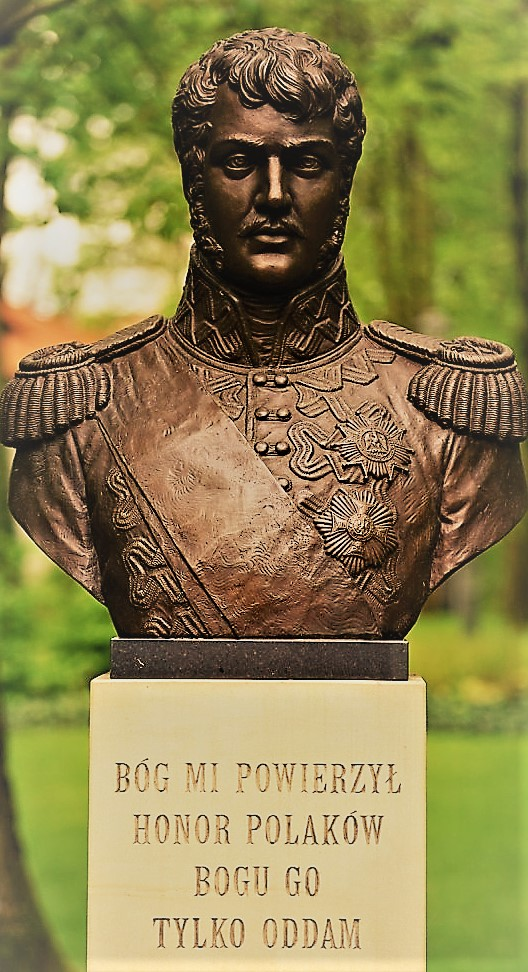
- The monument in 2023.
- Interactive map of Prince Józef Poniatowski Monument
- Location: Royal Baths Park, Downtown, Warsaw, Poland
- Coordinates: 52.215297°N 21.038442°E
- Designer: Paweł Pietrusiński
- Type: Bust
- Material: Bronze
- Height: 234 cm (total); 74 cm (bust)
- Opening date: 7 May 2023
- Dedicated to: Józef Poniatowski

Prince Józef Poniatowski Monument (Polish: Pomnik księcia Józefa Poniatowskiego) is a sculpture in Warsaw, Poland, within the neighbourhood of Ujazdów in the Downtown district. It has a form of a bronze bust of Józef Poniatowski, an 18th-century general, minister of war, commander-in-chief of the Army of the Duchy of Warsaw, and the Marshal of the French Empire during the Napoleonic Wars. The sculpture was designed by Paweł Pietrusiński, and unveiled on 7 May 2023. It is placed at the back of the Myślewice Palace in the Royal Baths Park.

== History ==
The monument was dedicated to Józef Poniatowski, an 18th-century general, minister of war, commander-in-chief of the Army of the Duchy of Warsaw, and the Marshal of the French Empire during the Napoleonic Wars. The sculpture was designed by Paweł Pietrusiński, and unveiled on 7 May 2023, in the 260th anniversary of Poniatowski's birth.

== Characteristics ==
The monument has a form of a bronze bust of Józef Poniatowski, wearing a uniform of a general of the Army of the Duchy of Warsaw, with epaulettes of the Marshal of the French Empire, office which he held for three days until his death in the Battle of Leipzig. His chest is decorated with orders of Legion of Honour and Virtuti Militari. His head is slightly tilted to the right. The sculpture is placed on a granite pedestal, which features a Polish inscription which reads "Bóg mi powierzył honour Polaków, Bogu go tylko oddam", that translates to "God entrusted in me the honour of the Poles, and only to God I will return it". Below it is name of Józef Antoni Poniatowski written in a cursive. The bust has the height of 74 cm, and its pedestal, 160 cm. It is placed at the back of the Myślewice Palace in the Royal Baths Park, which used to be Poniatowski's residence.

== See also ==
- Prince Józef Poniatowski Monument, another monument in Warsaw dedicated to him
