= Gao E (disambiguation) =

Gao E (c. 1738–c. 1815) was a Chinese author during the Qing dynasty.

Gao E may also refer to:

- Gao E (sport shooter) (born 1962), Chinese sport shooter
- Gao E (diplomat), Chinese diplomat
