= Chen Xinren =

Chinese politician (1915–2005)

Chen Xinren (Chinese: 陈辛仁; November 7, 1915 – July 25, 2005) was a People's Republic of China diplomat. He was born in Puning County, Guangdong Province (now Puning City, Guangdong). He was ambassador of the People's Republic of China to Finland (1954–1958), the Philippines (1978–1981), Iran (1972–1974) and the Netherlands (January 1975 – July 1978).

Diplomatic posts
Preceded by Geng Biao	People's Republic of China Ambassador to Finland; 1954–1958	Succeeded by Gan Yetao
Preceded by Ke Hua	People's Republic of China Ambassador to the Philippines; 1978–1981	Succeeded by Mo Yanzhong
Preceded by new office	People's Republic of China Ambassador to Iran; 1972–1974	Succeeded by Hao Deqing
Preceded by Hao Deqing	People's Republic of China Ambassador to the Netherlands; 1975–1978	Succeeded by Ding Xuesong
