= China–San Marino relations =

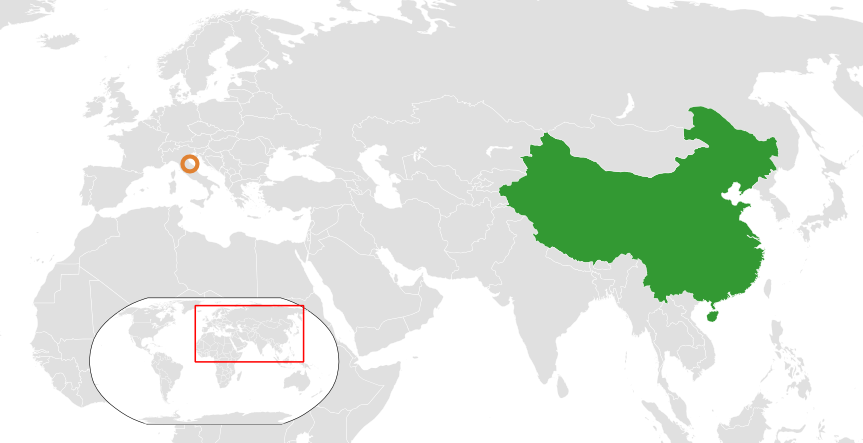
- China: San Marino

Diplomatic mission
- Embassy of China in Italy: Embassy of San Marino in China

Envoy
- Ambassador Li Junhua: Ambassador Ilaria Salicioni

China and San Marino established consular-level relations on 6 May 1971 and ambassador-level relations on 5 July 1991.

On 6 May 2021, Chinese President and General Secretary of the Communist Party Xi Jinping, and Sammarinese Captains Regent Gian Carlo Venturini and Marco Nicolini exchanged messages of congratulations in honor of the 50th anniversary of the establishment of diplomatic relations between the two countries. On the same day, events were held in San Marino to celebrate the anniversary.

== Economic and trade relations ==
Direct trade relations between China and San Marino began in 1988, but the volume of trade was not large. In 2014, the volume of trade between China and San Marino was US$5,810,000, including $2,830,000 exported by San Marino and $2,980,000 exported by China, and representing a year-on-year increase of 54.4%.

== Travel ==
On 6 May 1985, China and San Marino signed a mutual visa-free agreement, which took effect on 22 July of that year. This made San Marino the first country in the world to be allowed visa-free travel to mainland China for ordinary passports. However, because San Marino is completely surrounded by Italy, has no airports, and does not maintain border controls, in practice Chinese citizens need a Schengen visa in order to enter San Marino.
