= Yao Guang =

Chinese diplomat

Yao Guang (Chinese: 姚广; March 1921 – October 25, 2003) was a Chinese diplomat. He was born in Xiyang County, Shanxi. He was Ambassador of the People's Republic of China to the Dominion of Ceylon (now Sri Lanka) (1966–1969), Poland (1970–1971), Canada (1972–1973), Mexico (1973–1977), Egypt (1977–1980), Djibouti (1979–1982) and France (1980–1982). He was a member of the Standing Committee of the 7th National People's Congress (1988–1993).

Preceded by Xie Kexi	Ambassador of China to Ceylon; 1966–1969	Succeeded by Cao Keqiang
Preceded by Wang Guoquan	Ambassador of China to Poland; 1970–1971	Succeeded by Liu Shuqing
Preceded by Huang Hua	Ambassador of China to Canada; 1972–1973	Succeeded by Zhang Wenjin
Preceded by Xiong Xianghui	Ambassador of China to Mexico; 1973–1977	Succeeded by Liu Pu
Preceded by Zhang Tong	Ambassador of China to Egypt; 1977–1980	Succeeded by Liu Chun
Preceded by new office	Chinese Ambassador to Djibouti; 1979–1982	Succeeded by Cao Keqiang
Preceded by Han Kehua	Ambassador of China to France; 1980–1982	Succeeded by Cao Keqiang
