= List of ambassadors of China to Ecuador =

Coordinates: 0.182529°S 78.489171°W

The ambassador of China to Ecuador is the official representative of the People's Republic of China to the Republic of Ecuador.

== List of representatives ==
Designated	Accredited	Ambassador	Chinese language zh:中国驻厄瓜多尔大使列表	Observations	Premier of China	President of Ecuador	Term end
July 11, 1947		Yu Wang-teh	于望德	Envoy (title), also accredited in Bogotá (Colombia).: On January 12, 1948, Yu Wang-teh, Chinese Minister to Colombia and concurrently Minister to Ecuador, presented his credentials to President Carlos Julio Arosemena Tola. A TREATY of Friendship between China and Ecuador. was signed in Quito, 6 January, 1946C) [Ratifications exchanged at Quito on 19 April 1947.] THE Republic of Ecuador and the Republic of China,	Zhang Qun	Carlos Julio Arosemena Tola	
January 9, 1955		Xu Ze	徐澤	(*1904)	Yu Hung-Chun	Camilo Ponce Enríquez	January 7, 1957
1958		Chun-Jien Pao			Chen Cheng	Camilo Ponce Enríquez	
July 1, 1957		Hsieh Wei-lin	谢维麟		Yu Hung-Chun	Ramón Castro Jijón	April 1, 1964
May 11, 1964		Joseph Ku	zh:顧毓瑞	(*December 12, 1964 in Wuxi; 1994) was a brother of Y. H. Ku.	Yen Chia-kan	José María Velasco Ibarra	1969
1969		Tang Wu	湯武		Yen Chia-kan	José María Velasco Ibarra	November 19, 1971
November 19, 1971		The Republic of China suspends diplomatic relations with Ecuador.			Yen Chia-kan	José María Velasco Ibarra	November 19, 1971
January 2, 1980		The governments in Quito and Beijing established diplomatic relations.			Zhao Ziyang	Jaime Roldós	
September 29, 1980		Ding Hao	zh:丁浩 (外交官)		Zhao Ziyang	León Febres Cordero	January 1, 1985
May 7, 1985		Pan Wenjie	zh:潘文杰 (外交官)		Zhao Ziyang	León Febres Cordero	October 1, 1987
November 12, 1987		Wang Ganghua	zh:王钢华		Li Peng	Rodrigo Borja	May 1, 1991
May 13, 1991		Xu Yicong	zh:徐贻聪	(* 1938)	Li Peng	Sixto Durán Ballén	September 1, 1993
September 10, 1993		Yang Binwei	zh:杨斌伟		Li Peng	Jamil Mahuad	October 1, 1997
October 31, 1997		Zhang Hongzhao	zh:张鸿照		Li Peng	Gustavo Noboa	June 1, 2000
July 26, 2000		Liu Junxiu	zh:刘峻岫		Zhu Rongji	Gustavo Noboa	October 1, 2002
December 9, 2002	December 2, 2002	Zeng Gang	zh:曾钢		Zhu Rongji	Lucio Gutiérrez	August 1, 2004
October 14, 2004	September 29, 2004	Liu Yuqin	zh:刘玉琴		Wen Jiabao	Rafael Correa	February 1, 2007
February 17, 2007	March 22, 2007	Cai Runguo	zh:蔡润国		Wen Jiabao	Rafael Correa	January 1, 2011
January 12, 2011	February 3, 2011	Yuan Guisen	zh:苑桂森		Wen Jiabao	Rafael Correa	April 1, 2013
April 11, 2013	April 17, 2013	Wang Yulin	zh:王士雄 (外交官)		Li Keqiang	Guillermo Lasso	March 11, 2023

== See also ==
- China–Ecuador relations
