= China–Italy relations =

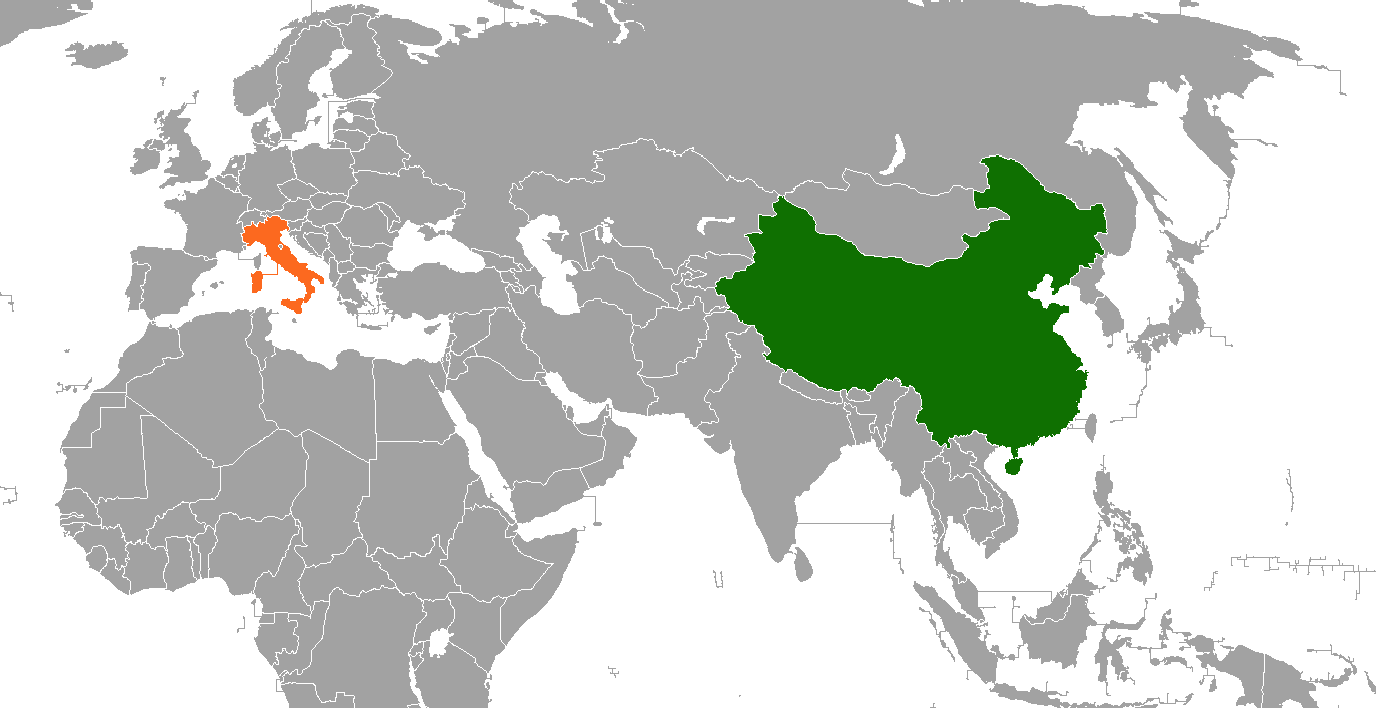
- China: Italy

Diplomatic mission
- Embassy of China, Rome: Embassy of Italy, Beijing

Envoy
- Ambassador Jia Guide: Ambassador Massimo Ambrosetti

Bilateral relations between China and Italy date back to Imperial China and Ancient Rome but the ties between Italy and modern China only formally began on 27 November 1928 (began in 1913) and recognized the People's Republic on 6 November 1970. News of Italy's recognition of the People's Republic of China and consequent breaking of formal relations with the Republic of China (Taiwan) spurred other European countries such as Austria and Belgium to consider similar moves.

Italian Foreign Minister Pietro Nenni presented the proposal for the recognition of China in January 1969. The Italian Communist Party had invited Chinese Communist Party (CCP) representatives to attend their 1969 party congress; however, the Chinese side declined the invitation. The two countries exchanged ambassadors in February of the following year.

Currently, China and Italy participate in high-level political exchanges. Chinese people in Italy, comprising both recent immigrants as well as persons of Chinese descent born in Italy, form a significant minority especially in Lazio, Lombardy, and Tuscany. With Prato being home to one of the largest overseas Chinese communities in Europe.

== Roman era ==
The Roman historian Florus describes the visit of numerous envoys, including Seres (Chinese or central Asians), to the first Roman Emperor Augustus, who reigned between 27 BC and 14. However, Henry Yule speculated that these were more likely to have been private merchants than diplomats, since Chinese records insist that Gan Ying was the first Chinese to reach as far west as Tiaozhi (條支; Mesopotamia) in 97 CE. In 97 the Chinese general Ban Chao dispatched an envoy to Rome in the person of Gan Ying. Gan Ying never made it to Rome. He might have reached the eastern coast of the Mediterranean, although he most likely went no further than the Persian Gulf. Monk turned diplomat Rabban Bar Sauma traveled from Beijing to Rome in the 1280s. Andalò da Savignone, an Italian resident in the small Genoese colony in Zaytun, was sent by the Khans from Beijing to Italy as a diplomat to the pope in 1336. Chinese diplomats have been active in Italy since the time of the Qing dynasty and just a few decades after the Unification of Italy. The Qing diplomat Li Fengbao was ambassador to Italy in the late 19th century, as were his contemporaries Kung Chao-Yuan, Xue Fucheng and Xu Jingcheng. The Republic of China would later send its own ambassadors after Italy's recognition of the Republic. Modern China's first ambassador was Shen Ping (沈平), while the current ambassador is Li Junhua (李军华).

During the era of the Roman Empire, the first group of people claiming to be an ambassadorial mission of Romans to China was recorded in 16 AD in the Book of the Later Han. The embassy came to Emperor Huan of Han China from "Andun" (Chinese: 安敦; Emperor Antoninus Pius or Marcus Aurelius Antoninus), "king of Daqin" (Rome). In 226 AD China was visited by the Roman Qin Lun (秦論), who wasn't a diplomat but a merchant. He visited the court of Sun Quan in Nanjing. Other Roman envoys followed in the 3rd century. One embassy from Daqin (Rome) is recorded as bringing tributary gifts to the Chinese Jin Empire (266–420 AD).

== Marco Polo ==
The most notable contact between China and Italy dates back to over 700 years ago, with Italian explorer Marco Polo famously sojourning in the country for seventeen years between 1271 and 1295, a few decades after Giovanni da Pian del Carpine's visit to Karakorum. Polo's visit was followed by the arrival in Beijing of Giovanni da Montecorvino, the first archbishop of Beijing, in 1294. Michele Ruggieri, an Italian Jesuit priest from Apulia and one of the founding figures of the Jesuit China missions, was the first European to enter the Forbidden City.

== Kingdom of Italy ==
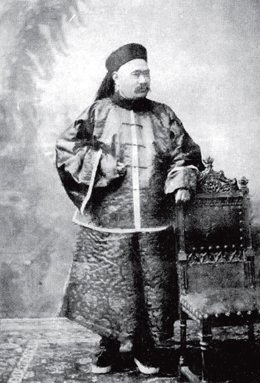
Xue Fucheng, Chinese ambassador to Italy

The Kingdom of Italy established diplomatic relations with Qing China in 1866.

There was a Sino-Italian diplomatic incident that occurred in March 1899 refers Sanmen Bay Affair. Italy sought to occupy the Sanmen Islands in front of Shanghai, but the Chinese government rejected their claim. In response, the Italian government presented an ultimatum to the Qing embassy and sent military forces to occupy the area, which led to a diplomatic crisis. This event is significant as it highlighted Italy's struggle for recognition and influence in China, and it may have influenced the Chinese government's approach to foreign powers, ultimately contributing to the Boxer Rebellion later that year. Italy received its concession in Tientsin on 7 September 1901. The concession was occupied by the Japanese in September 1943 after Italy surrendered to the Allies, and liberated in October 1945 by the Chinese Army. Italy officially renounced its claims to the concession in 1947. On October 16, 1866, a trade treaty between China an Italy was signed, and eight months later the ambassador Count Vittorio Sallier de la Tour, appointed Italian representative to the courts of Jeddo and Beijing, arrived in East Asia. He and his successors Alessandro Fè d'Ostiani and Raffaele Ulisse Barbolani, however, kept their seat in Japan. Ferdinando de Luca was the first Italian ambassador to be headquartered in China, establishing the embassy in Shanghai, which was moved to Beijing at the end of the 1880s. In 1913, Italy recognized Sun Yat-sen's Republic, and thereafter maintained a position of neutrality in the various conflicts with different parties vying for power in China. Italy formally recognized Kuomintang's Republic of China, and on November 27, 1928, signed a new trade treaty, which supplanted the 1866 treaty. The negotiations were led by Daniele Varè and the treaty signed in Nanjing, China's new capital. Chang Kai-shek insisted that all the Occidental powers move their embassies in Nanjing, considering this action as the further, final acknowledgment of his power. Italy, as some other great powers, decided to split its embassy between Nanjing and Shanghai, in two physically detached offices.

Hongdu Aviation, one of China's major aircraft manufacturers, was first established as Sino-Italian National Aircraft Works (SINAW) in 1934, as a joint venture between the Republic of China and the Kingdom of Italy. However, after the Second Sino-Japanese War broke out in 1937, Italy became an ally of Japan and assisted Japan in its bombing of SINAW factories. The Chinese government confiscated Italian properties in December 1937 and all Italian employees of the company left by the end of the year.

At the end of 1937 Fascist Italy recognized Manchukuo, and in 1941 it recognized Wang Jingwei's Republic of China, with its capital in Nanjing, although the Italian ambassadors continued to reside in Shanghai for some more time. The Italian delegate Pier Pasquale Spinelli then decided to move the embassy's principal seat to Nanjing, while also reopening the detached offices of Beijing and Shanghai. In 1945, Mussolini's followers kept in touch with Wang Jingwei's government in Beijing, Shanghai and Nanjing, while the post-fascist Ministry of Foreign Affairs worked to resume contact with Chiang Kai-shek, to whom the new Italian representative Sergio Fenoaltea officially presented his credentials in October 1946 in Naijing. In 1945, the Italians were about to loan the offices of the closed embassy in Beijing to the Americans, which however didn't materialize because before the Americans arrived, a group of Chinese, on the nationalist side but following the orders of an independent general looking for riches, looted the embassy and damaged the building and the archives.

== Republic of Italy ==
After the start of the offensive in 1947, the CCP took Beijing in 1949 and shortly after Naijing. In November 1950, Fenoaltea, who had been pressuring Rome to let him come back to Italy, departed from China. Diplomatic relations were then led by Ezio Mizzan who, in February 1951, reported that the CCP police was restricting ever more his activities and movements and that the permanence of the Italian embassy in Naijing, Chiang Kai-shek's and Wang Jingwei's former capital, may cause political inconveniences. He advised Rome to take a firm decision either recognizing China, moving him and the embassy to Beijing, or moving all diplomats out. After initially leaning towards following such countries as Denmark, Norway and the United Kingdom in recognizing China, Italy chose the opposite, dismantling Naijing's embassy and breaking diplomatic relations, influenced by the counsel of the United States, which had initially pondered allowing Italy's recognition of China to pave the way for the inevitable recognition by them.

Italy did not recognize the People's Republic of China until 1970. During the twenty-year break of diplomatic relations, Italy didn't have an embassy in China, and maintained relations with nationalist China, although it never sent an ambassador to Taipei either. In the twenty-year break, Italy "limited itself to giving some unspecified duties of observation of the Chinese question" to its general consulate in Hong Kong. In 1970, the news of Italy's recognition of the People's Republic of China and consequent breaking of formal relations with the Republic of China spurred other European countries such as Austria and Belgium to consider similar moves.

== 21st Century ==
In March 2019, during Chinese leader Xi Jinping's visit to Italy, China signed a memorandum of understanding on China's Belt and Road Initiative (BRI) with Italy. Italy became the only G7 country to join the BRI. In July 2023 declared its intention to quit the BRI. Prime Minister Giorgia Meloni stated that the project was not of any real benefit to Italy's economy. The Ministry of Foreign Affairs of China described Italy's actions as "disrupting cooperation and creating divisions". Publishing in 2025, academic Chuchu Zhang writes that bilateral economic cooperation between Italy and China was not disrupted by Italy's intent to withdraw, and trade between the two countries increased through February 2024.

In March 2020, Chinese state owned TV channel CGTN and Chinese newspaper Global Times were reported to have attempted to spread a disinformation campaign that the COVID-19 pandemic may have originated in Italy after the United States.

On 13 March 2020, China sent medical supplies, including masks and respirators to Italy, together with a team of Chinese medical staff to help Italy and fight the virus across the country. After China donated millions of masks, China sold masks to Italy. These were not donations but rather paid products and services. On March 24, 2020, Italian Foreign Minister Luigi Di Maio stated in an interview that after the outbreak in Italy, China was the first to provide Italy with medical supplies and dispatch medical experts. When the virus broke out, Italy was accused of dumping materials used to protect Italians at a low price because it presented 40,000 masks to China. Today, China is giving back millions of masks. Italian Prime Minister Giuseppe Conte thanked China for its support and assistance. However, in April 2020 after the tragedy, it was reported that the PPE kits sold by China to Italy were the same that Italy had earlier donated to China during the initial spread of the COVID-19 in China. The Chinese Ministry of Foreign Affairs responded: This is false news. The Italian government did not respond yet.

In May 2020, Chinese diplomats Hua Chunying and Zhao Lijian each tweeted a video of Italians chanting "Grazie, Cina" with China's national anthem playing in the background. Analysis by the Financial Times suggests that the videos were doctored, raising concerns about Chinese propaganda activities in the European Union and attempts to undermine Europe's response to the health crisis and project China and Russia as the only ones with a robust strategy to combat COVID-19.

In March 2026, the Italian Ministry of the Interior ordered the expulsion of eight Chinese nationals suspected of spying on dissidents and conducting transnational repression on Italian soil.

== Security concerns ==
In March 2019, Italy's parliamentary Comitato parliamentare per la sicurezza della Repubblica (COPASIR), the body of the Italian Parliament to oversee the Italian intelligence agencies raised concerns that Italy joining the Belt and Road Initiative (BRI) project could present security risks for Italy given that infrastructure, telecoms, finance were all in the BRI agreement package to be signed with China. The chief of COPASIR also raised the concerns of "evaluation of possible risks" in the area of cyber security.

Concerns have been raised by the EU and the US over technology transfer and protection of intellectual property of European partners as well as Chinese involvement in Italian telecommunications networks raising fears regarding network security in Europe and the US.

In October 2020, in signs of Italy toughening its stance with respect to communications and network security, the Italian government vetoed a 5G deal between Italian telecom firm Fastweb and China's Huawei. Earlier in July, Italy's largest telecom company Telecom Italia (TIM) had left Huawei out of an invitation to tender for a contract to supply 5G equipment for its core network, where sensitive data was processed.

In November 2024, Italy opened an investigation into Sinochem, the largest shareholder of Pirelli, for potential violations of restrictions to protect Italian national strategic assets. Citing concerns about sales into the U.S. market with a Chinese state shareholder, the Italian government aims to make Sinochem a passive investor in Pirelli.

=== Cyberwarfare ===
Between 2024 and 2025, cyber-intrusions linked to China into Italy's Ministry of the Interior compromised the identity of 5,000 DIGOS officers. In July 2025, a hacker allegedly working with Hafnium, Xu Zewei, was arrested in Milan. Italy extradited Xu to the United States in April 2026.

== Public opinion ==
A survey published in 2026 by the Pew Research Center found that 51% of Italians had a favorable view of China, while 46% had an unfavorable view. It also found that 63% of Italians in the 18-35 age group had positive opinions of China.

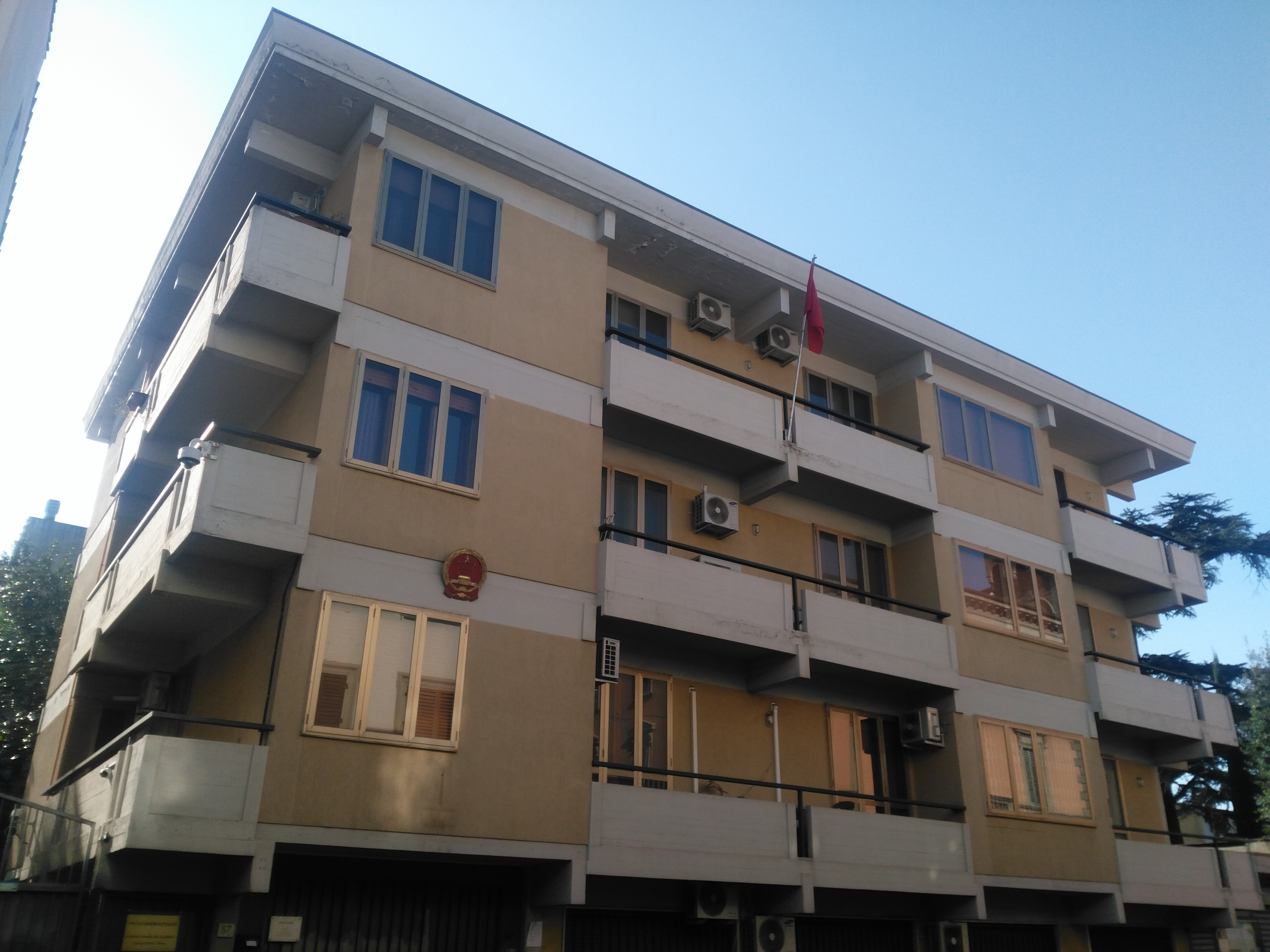
Consulate-General of China in Florence

== Resident diplomatic missions ==
- China has an embassy in Rome and consulates-general in Florence and Milan.
- Italy has an embassy in Beijing and consulates-general in Chongqing, Guangzhou, Hong Kong and Shanghai.

== See also ==
- Foreign relations of China
- Foreign relations of Italy
- Chinese people in Italy
- Prospero Intorcetta
- Ludovico Buglio
- Nicolò Longobardo
- Europeans in Medieval China, primarily the 13th–14th centuries
- Giovanni de' Marignolli, 14th century Archbishop of Khanbaliq (Beijing)
- Giuseppe Castiglione (Jesuit painter), a court painter for the Qianlong Emperor during the 18th century
- John of Montecorvino, 13th–14th century Archbishop of Khanbaliq (Beijing)
- Caterina Vilioni, 14th-century Italian woman who lived in Yangzhou
- Marco Polo, 13th-century merchant who served as an envoy for the Yuan dynasty
- Matteo Ricci, Jesuit missionary who arrived in Ming-dynasty China in 1582, created a world map in Chinese and translated texts
- Odoric of Pordenone, Christian missionary to Yuan-dynasty China
- Rabban Bar Sauma, 13th century native of Zhongdu (Beijing) who travelled to Europe and met the pope and various European monarchs
- Sino-Roman relations, Han dynasty and Roman Empire relations beginning at least by 166 AD with Antoninus Pius and Marcus Aurelius (see also Daqin)

== Sources ==
- Yule, Henry (1915). Henri Cordier (ed.), Cathay and the Way Thither: Being a Collection of Medieval Notices of China, Vol I: Preliminary Essay on the Intercourse Between China and the Western Nations Previous to the Discovery of the Cape Route. London: Hakluyt Society. Retrieved 21 September 2016.
- Ball, Warwick (2016). Rome in the East: Transformation of an Empire, 2nd edition. London: Routledge, ISBN 978-0-415-72078-6.
- Young, Gary K. (2001). Rome's Eastern Trade: International Commerce and Imperial Policy, 31 BC – AD 305. London: Routledge, ISBN 0-415-24219-3.
