= Wang Bingnan =

Chinese diplomat

- 王炳南
- Born: Wang Bingnan; 1908; Haozhi Village, Yanghong Xiang, Qian County, Shaanxi, China
- Died: December 22, 1988 (aged 79–80)
- Occupation: Chinese government official
- Years active: 1936–1966
- Political party: Chinese Communist Party
- Spouse(s): Anneliese Martens (Anna Wang 王安娜; 1936–1987); Zhang Yuyun

Director General of the General Office of Ministry of Foreign Affairs
- In office 1949–1955

Vice-Minister, Ministry of Foreign Affairs (1964-1975)
- In office 1964–1975

Chinese Ambassador to Poland
- In office March 1955 – April 1964
- Preceded by: Zeng Yongquan
- Succeeded by: Wang Guoquan

Wang Bingnan (1908–1988) was a diplomat and foreign affairs official of the Chinese Communist Party and the People's Republic of China.

Before 1949, Wang was one of Zhou Enlai's trusted aides and after the founding of the People's Republic in 1949 he became Director General of the General Office of Ministry of Foreign Affairs. In January and February 1955 he was Assistant Foreign Minister, and in March of that year became Chinese Ambassador to Poland, a position in which he served until April 1964. While in Poland, he was the Chief Representative of China in the nine-year-long Sino-US Ambassadorial Talks. He was Secretary General of the Chinese Delegation during the Geneva Conference of 1954. In 1966, at the start of the Cultural Revolution, Wang was attacked and imprisoned by the Red Guards. Although he was rehabilitated in 1975, he suffered a heart attack. He died in 1988.

== Early life and revolutionary activities ==
Wang graduated from the Luoyang Military Academy in 1929 and then left for a year of study in Japan. After two years he left for four years of study at the University of Berlin, where he studied sociology. While there, he was Secretary of the Chinese Language Branch of the Communist Party of Germany, Director of East Department of the Great International League against Imperialism, Chairman of the League against Imperialism of Chinese in Europe, and eventually President of the European Overseas Chinese Anti-Imperialist League. He was especially active in rallying Overseas Chinese in Europe to support resistance to Japan's encroachment in China. In Germany, he met and married Anneliese Martens (Anna Wang 王安娜; 1909 - 1990) a German activist and fellow student at the University of Berlin. They were married in London.

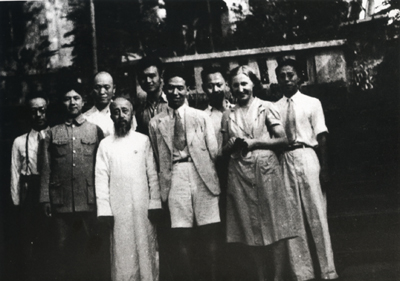
Seeing Off Sa Kongliao 1939: Wang; Anna Wang

Wang returned to Shanghai with his wife in 1936. They became leading figures in Chinese Communist Party (CCP) relations with foreign countries and foreigners in China. In 1936, since he was a Shaanxi native, the CCP dispatched Wang there to build relations with General Yang Hucheng, who controlled the area around Xi'an, where Mao's wing of the CCP had set up a headquarters. Wang encouraged General Yang to join the active resistance to Japan rather than press the fight against the Communists. In late 1936, in the Xi'an Incident, General Yang and Zhang Xueliang held Generalissimo Chiang Kai-shek against his will to force him into active resistance against Japan. Zhou Enlai, apparently at the behest of Joseph Stalin, negotiated Jiang's release and came to rely on Wang's contacts with all sides and his skills in these negotiations.

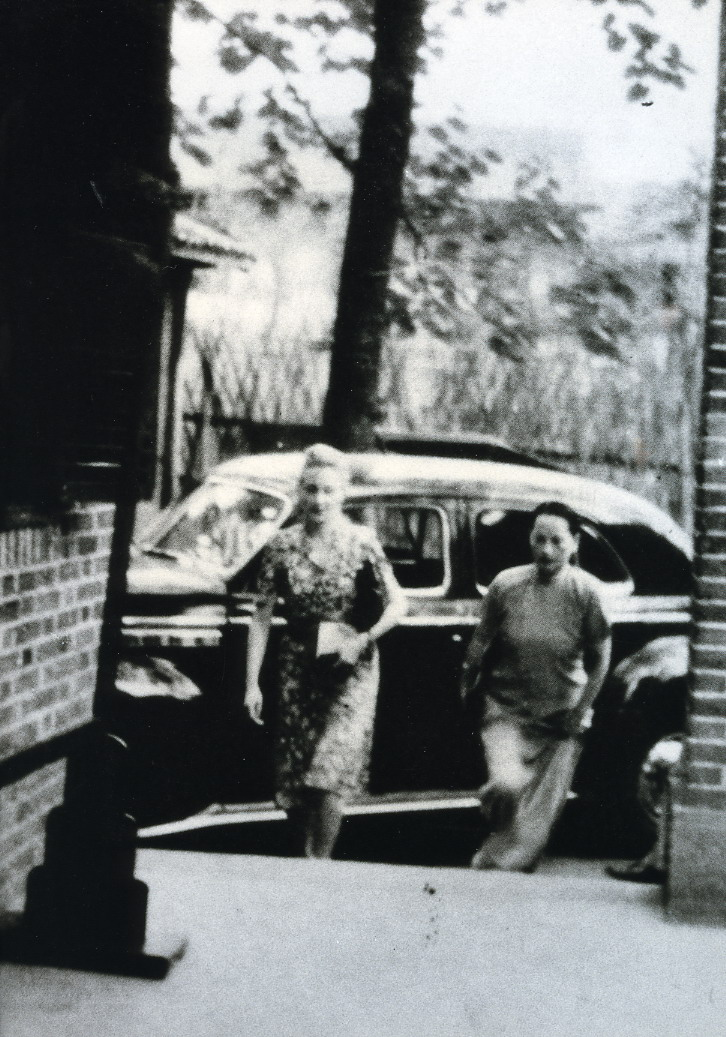
Soong Ching-ling and Anna Wang visit Mao Zedong, 1945

In 1939, in response to Mao's directive to place even greater weight on foreign propaganda, the CCP formed a Foreign Affairs Small Group, whose members included Wang Bingnan, Chen Jiakang, Qiao Guanhua, and Gong Peng, a group that stayed together and formed the nucleus of the Foreign Ministry a decade later. The CCP leadership expected them to follow world developments and to cultivate good relations with foreign journalists, diplomats, and soldiers. During the war with Japan, the group served with Zhou in Chongqing, and when wartime cooperation with the Nationalist government turned to Civil War after 1945, Wang was deputy under Ye Jianying in the Foreign Affairs Group of the CCP Central Committee. Wang and Anna visited India briefly in 1945 but returned to work with the Marshall Mission from the end of 1945 to 1947, where he met American diplomats.

== After 1949 ==
Wang was in the group of Zhou Enlai's protegees from the 1930s who filled most of the positions when the Ministry of Foreign Affairs was formed in 1949. Wang was Director General of the General Office, the largest office in the Ministry of Foreign Affairs, from 1949 to 1955. During the 1954 Geneva Conference he was Secretary General of the Chinese Delegation, where he conducted negotiations with U. Alexis Johnson and other senior United States diplomats. He then served briefly as Assistant Foreign Minister in January and February 1955 before becoming Chinese Ambassador to Poland from March 1955 to April 1964.

As ambassador to Poland, Wang was the highest level diplomat of the People's Republic to have direct contact with American diplomats. During the First Taiwan Strait Crisis of 1955 Wang conducted ambassadorial-level talks in Warsaw with United States Ambassador Jacob D. Beam. Mao recalled Wang to Beijing for a detailed briefing in a private talk, and Wang left for Warsaw with detailed instructions to find out if Washington would be willing to force Nationalist armies from the islands if offered concessions in return. When Wang revealed to Beam this willingness to concede before extracting concessions in return, Mao attacked him: "even a pig knows to turn around after he hits a wall, and Wang Bingnan does not know how to turn around after he hits a wall." Mao only agreed to keep Wang in Warsaw when Premier Zhou assumed the blame.

== Cultural Revolution and Wang's death ==
In 1967, as the Cultural Revolution gained momentum, Wang was suspended from his job at the Ministry of Foreign Relations and Red Guard factions confined him in the basement of an old hotel. He was shown the scarred and mutilated body of Zhang Yuyun, his second wife, and was told that she had killed herself. In 1969 he was released to go to a cadre school, and allowed to return to the capital only in 1972. He did not have a job or official residence there, however, and lived with his family in cramped conditions. Deng Xiaoping gave him a position in the Chinese People's Association for Friendship with Foreign Countries in 1975, but when Deng himself was again purged the following year, Wang had a heart attack. He died in 1988.

== Family life ==
His eldest son was Wang Dongming (王東明) and his second son, Wang Boming (王波明), was editor of Caijing (财经).

== Selected writings ==
- with 罗瑞卿 (Luo Ruiqing) 呂正操 (Lü Zhengcao), 西安事変和周恩来同志 (Xi'an shibian he Zhou Enlai tongzhi Zou Enlai and the Xi'an Incident) (Beijing: Ren min chu ban she: 1978); translated as Luo, Ruiqing, Zhengcao Lu¨, and Bingnan Wang. Zhou Enlai and the Xi'an Incident: An Eyewitness Account: a Turning Point in Chinese History. Beijing: Foreign Languages Press, 1983.
- 中美会谈九年回顾 (Zhong-Mei huitan jiunian huigu) (Memoir of nine year Sino-American negotiations) 世界知识出版社 : 新华书店北京发行所发行, Beijing: Shijie zhishi chuban she: Xinhua shudian Beijing faxing suo faxing, 1985
