= Huang Mingda =

Chinese diplomat

Huang Mingda (Chinese: 黄明达) was a Chinese diplomat. He was born in Nanhai, Guangdong. He was Ambassador of the People's Republic of China to Sri Lanka (1973–1977), Afghanistan (1977–1979) and Myanmar (1982–1985).

- From 1965 to 1966 he was Counsellor of the Embassy in Burma.
- From 1970 to 1971 he was Chargé d'affaires of the Chinese Ambassador to India.

Preceded by Ma Ziqing	Chinese Ambassador to Sri Lanka; 1973–1977	Succeeded by
Preceded by Gan Yetao	Chinese Ambassador to Afghanistan; 1977–1979	Succeeded by vacant until 2002, then Sun Yuxi
Preceded by Mo Yanzhong	Chinese Ambassador to Myanmar; 1982–1985	Succeeded by Zhou Mingji
