= Prince Józef Poniatowski Monument =

- Pomnik Księcia Józefa Poniatowskiego w Warszawie
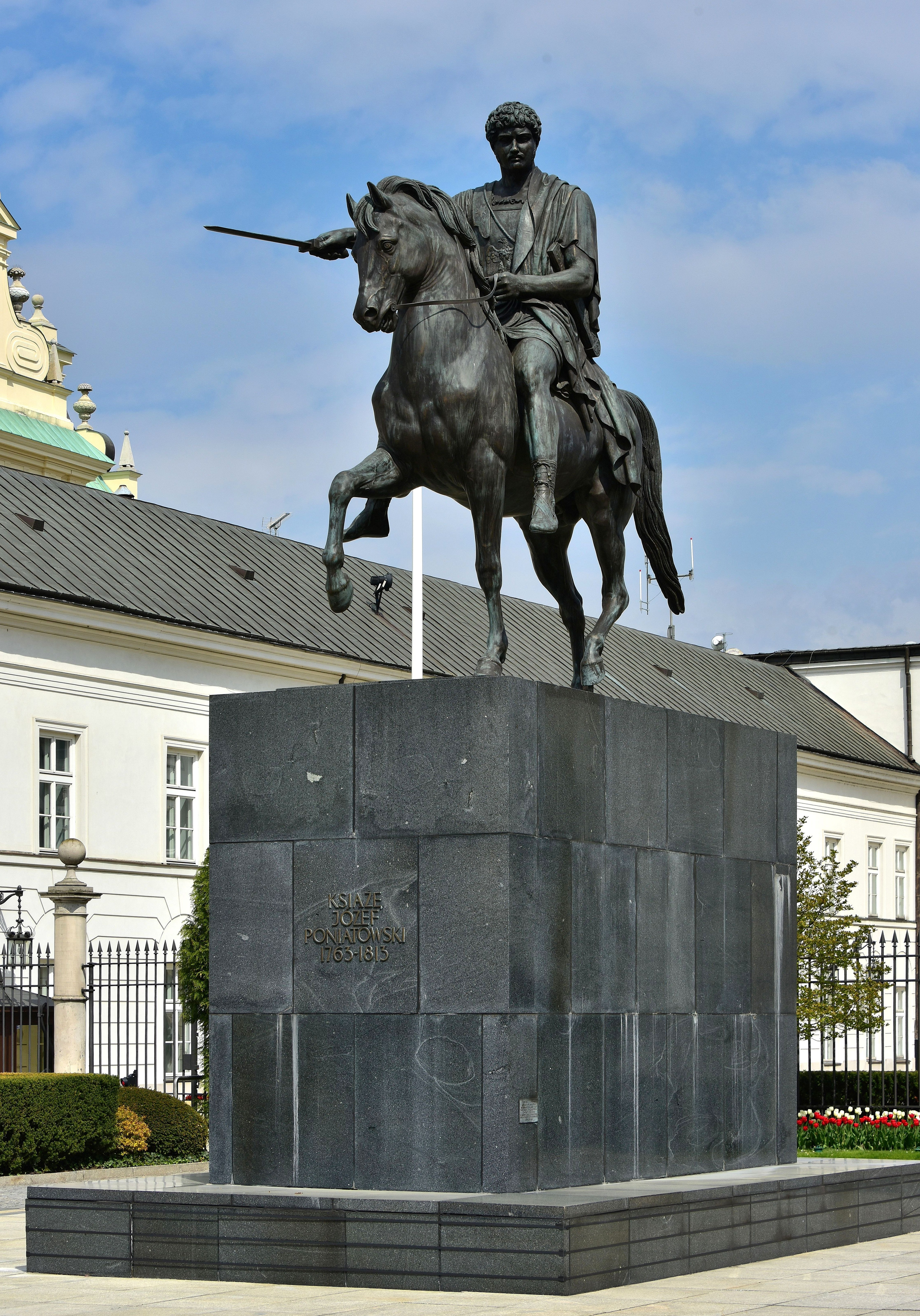
- The monument in front of the Presidential Palace
- Interactive map of Prince Józef Poniatowski Monument
- Location: 46/48 Krakowskie Przedmieście, Warsaw
- Coordinates: 52°14′34.08″N 21°00′55.69″E
- Designer: Bertel Thorvaldsen
- Type: Equestrian statue
- Beginning date: 1817
- Completion date: August, 1832
- Opening date: 3 May 1923; 23 February 1952; 19 October 1965

Historic Monument of Poland
- Designated: 1994-09-08
- Part of: Warsaw – historic city center with the Royal Route and Wilanów
- Reference no.: M.P. 1994 nr 50 poz. 423

The Prince Józef Poniatowski Monument in Warsaw (Polish: Pomnik Księcia Józefa Poniatowskiego) is a monument currently located at 46/48 Krakowskie Przedmieście in the courtyard of the Presidential Palace. Created by Rome-based Danish-Icelandic sculptor Bertel Thorvaldsen in 1829, it depicts Józef Poniatowski (1763–1813) riding a horse and dressed as Roman general.

== Description ==
The statue depicts Prince Józef Poniatowski (1763–1813) riding a horse and holding a sword in his right hand. The figure of the prince is modeled on the monument of Marcus Aurelius from the Roman Capitoline Hill.

== History ==
=== Creation of the monument ===
The monument's creation was at the behest of Polish aristocracy. Polish aristocrat and diarist Anna Potocka obtained permission from the Tsar to place the monument in front of the Governor's Palace (which is now the Presidential Palace). The monument was commissioned in 1817 from Danish sculptor Bertel Thorvaldsen.

In 1829, in Warsaw, he presented a life-size plaster model in classicist form. The project was not well received by critics and the public who were expecting to see the warrior clad in the armour of a soldier, while Thorvaldsen introduced him as a half-naked Roman general.

=== A monument on the move ===
Based on the model, Klaudiusz and Emil Gregoire's foundry in Długa Street in Warsaw made a bronze cast which was completed in August, 1832. Meanwhile, as a result of the failed November Uprising, Russian consent for the placement of the monument had been withdrawn as part of the Tsar's sanctions against Poland, which was confirmed by a special order in 1834. The finished cast was first taken to the Modlin Fortress, where the sculpture was originally regarded as the patron of the fortress, St. George. In 1836, the monument was dismantled and placed in 10 boxes in the fortress. In 1840, the monument was assembled again, and during an inspection of the fortress by Tsar Nicholas I, it was decided to scrap the monument, but he changed his mind.

Later in 1840, the statue was taken to Dęblin, and in 1842 to the Paskevich Palace in Gomel. The monument adorned the palace in Gomel from 1842 to 1922. In Warsaw, a monument to Ivan Paskevich (by sculptors Nikolai Pimienov and Aleksander von Bock) was unveiled in 1870, at the site where Prince Józef Poniatowski's monument was meant to be. Paskevich's statue was pulled down in 1917, when Poland regained independence.

=== Return to Poland ===
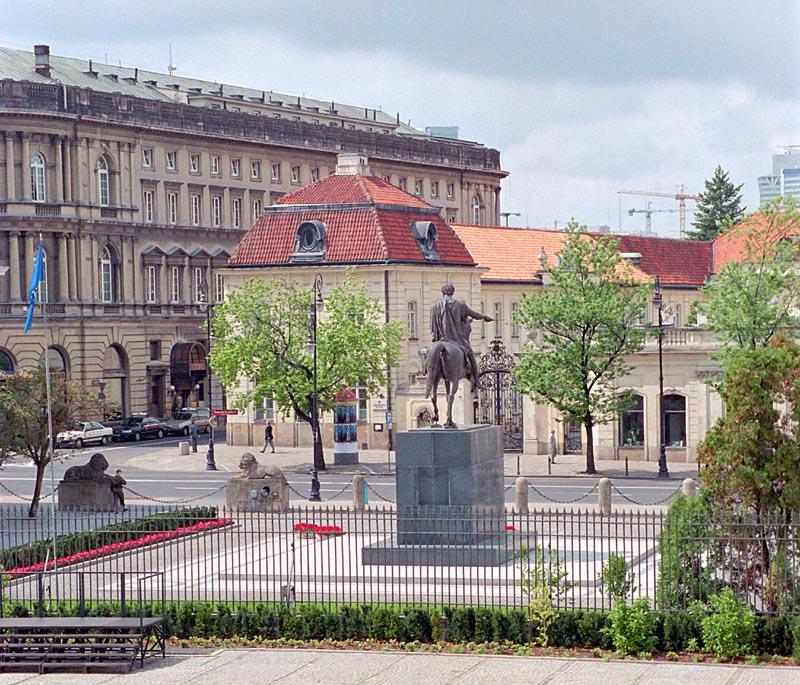
The monument as seen from the windows of the Presidential Palace

The monument to Prince Józef Poniatowski returned to independent Poland in 1922, as part of the recovery of monuments and works of art under the Treaty of Riga. It originally stood in the courtyard of the Royal Castle, and from 1923, in Saxon Square, on a pedestal designed by Aleksander Bojemski in front of the Saxon Palace and the Tomb of the Unknown Soldier. The unveiling ceremony for the monument was associated with the arrival and appointment of Ferdinand Foch as a Marshal of Poland.

=== Destruction and new cast ===
The monument was blown up on December 16, 1944, on the orders of German General Erich von dem Bach-Zelewski.

A new cast of the sculpture, made from 1948 to 1951, based on a model at the Thorvaldsen Museum in Copenhagen, was made by Poul Lauritz Rasmussen, and donated to Warsaw by the Kingdom of Denmark. On February 23, 1952, the monument was placed in front of the Old Orangery (Stara Pomarańczarnia) in Łazienki Park, and in 1965 it was moved to the courtyard of the Presidential Palace where it is today.

== Exhibitions ==
The remains of the original sculpture, found in April 1945, in the ruins of the Lilpop factory, are exhibited in the Freedom Park at the Warsaw Uprising Museum.

Thorvaldsen's original plaster model is on display in the Thorvaldsen Museum in Copenhagen.

== Gallery ==
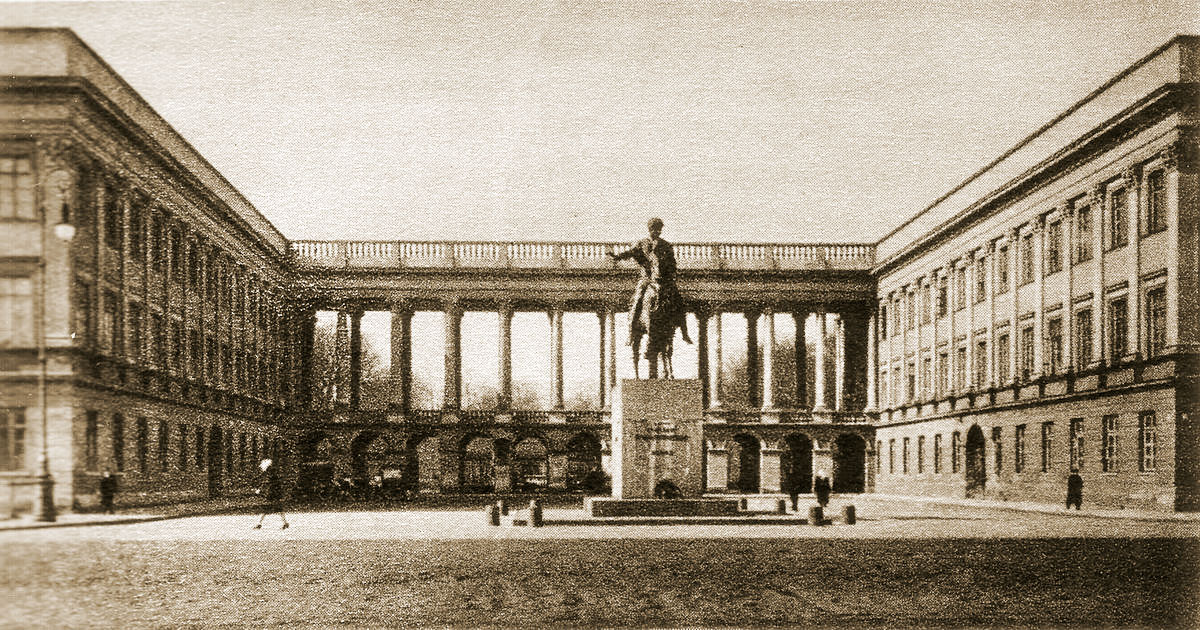
In front of the Saxon Palace, Summer 1920

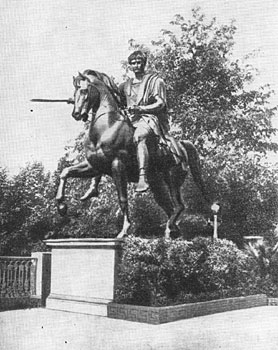
In Gomel, before 1922

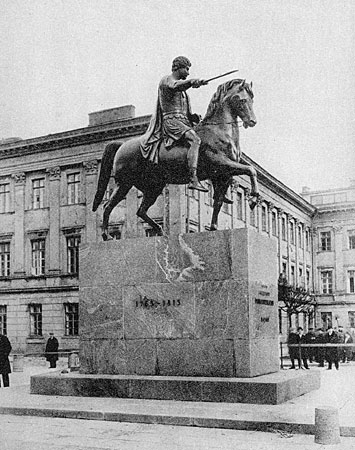
In front of the Saxon Palace, approximately 1925

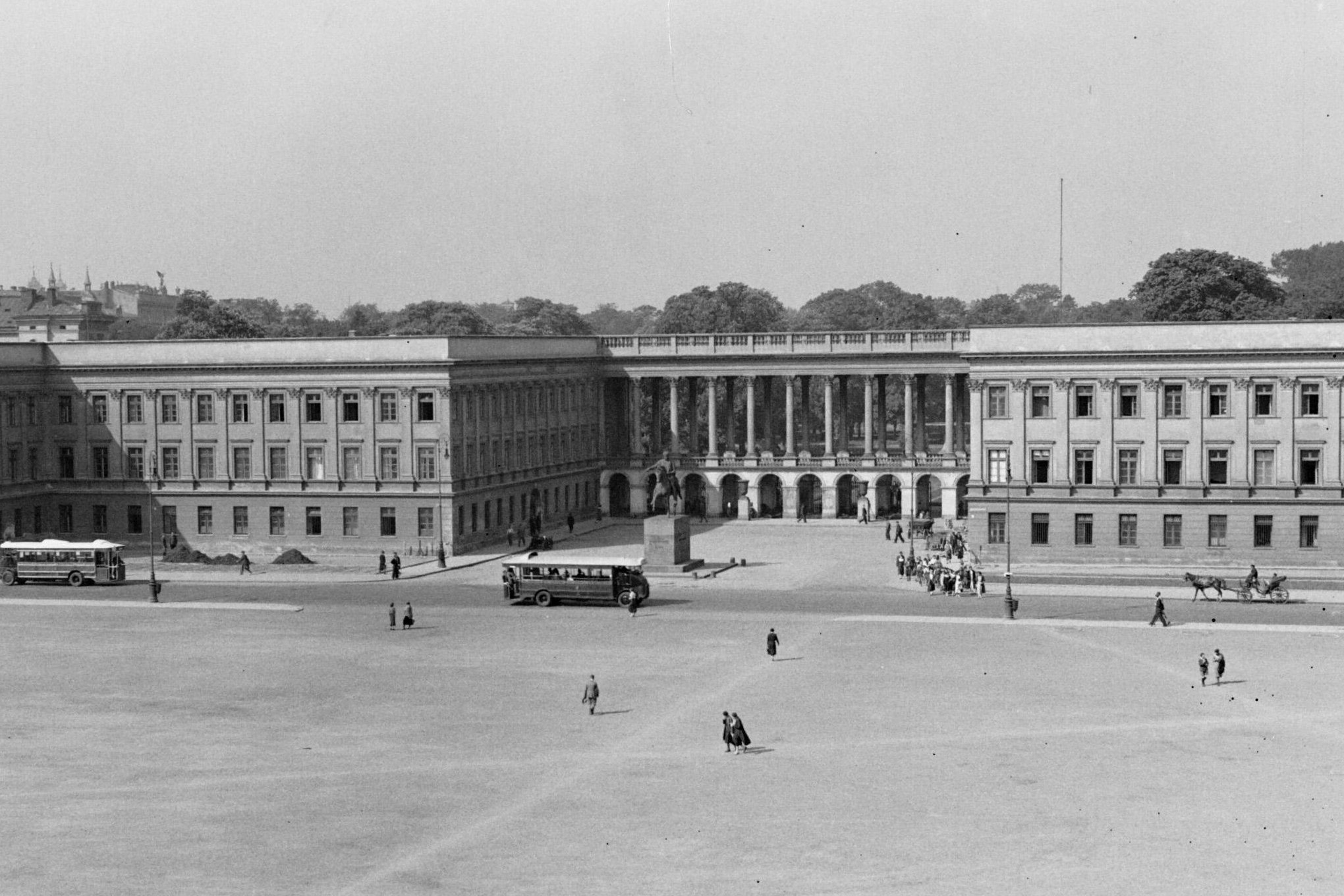
In front of the Saxon Palace, 1934

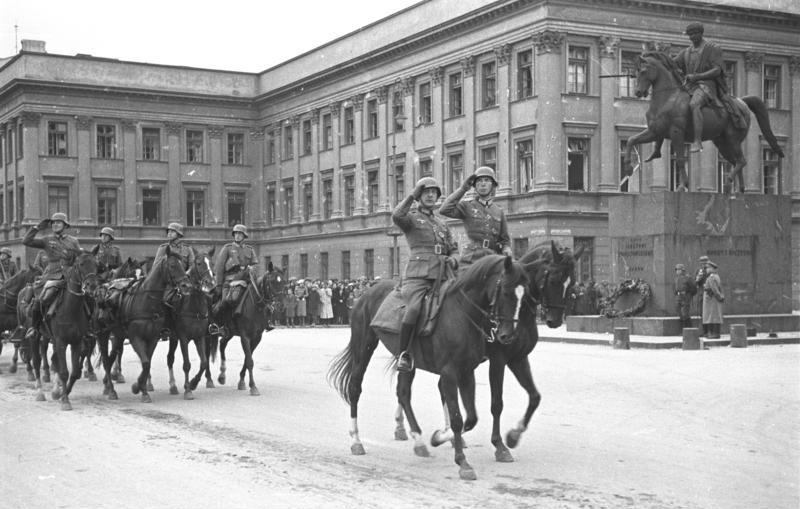
A German parade in front of the monument, September/October 1939

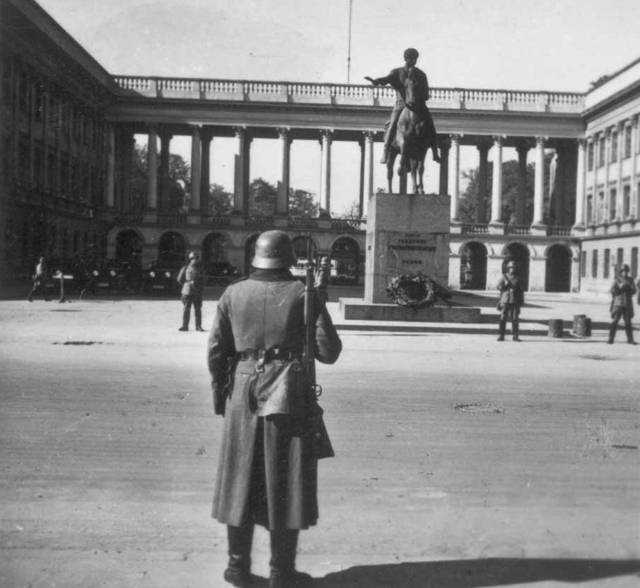
German sentries in front of the monument, in 1939 or 1940

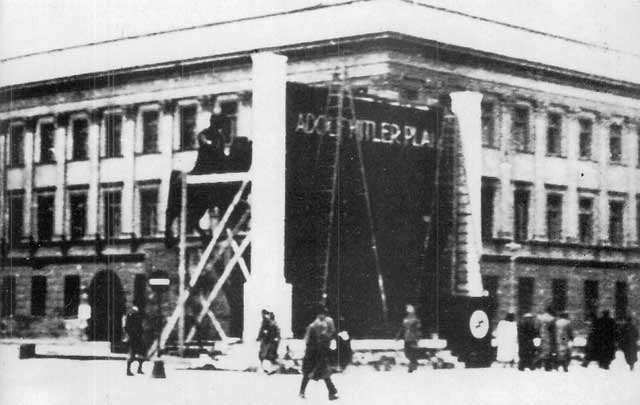
Germans obscure the monument on the eve of the 1st anniversary of the invasion of Poland, August 30, 1940

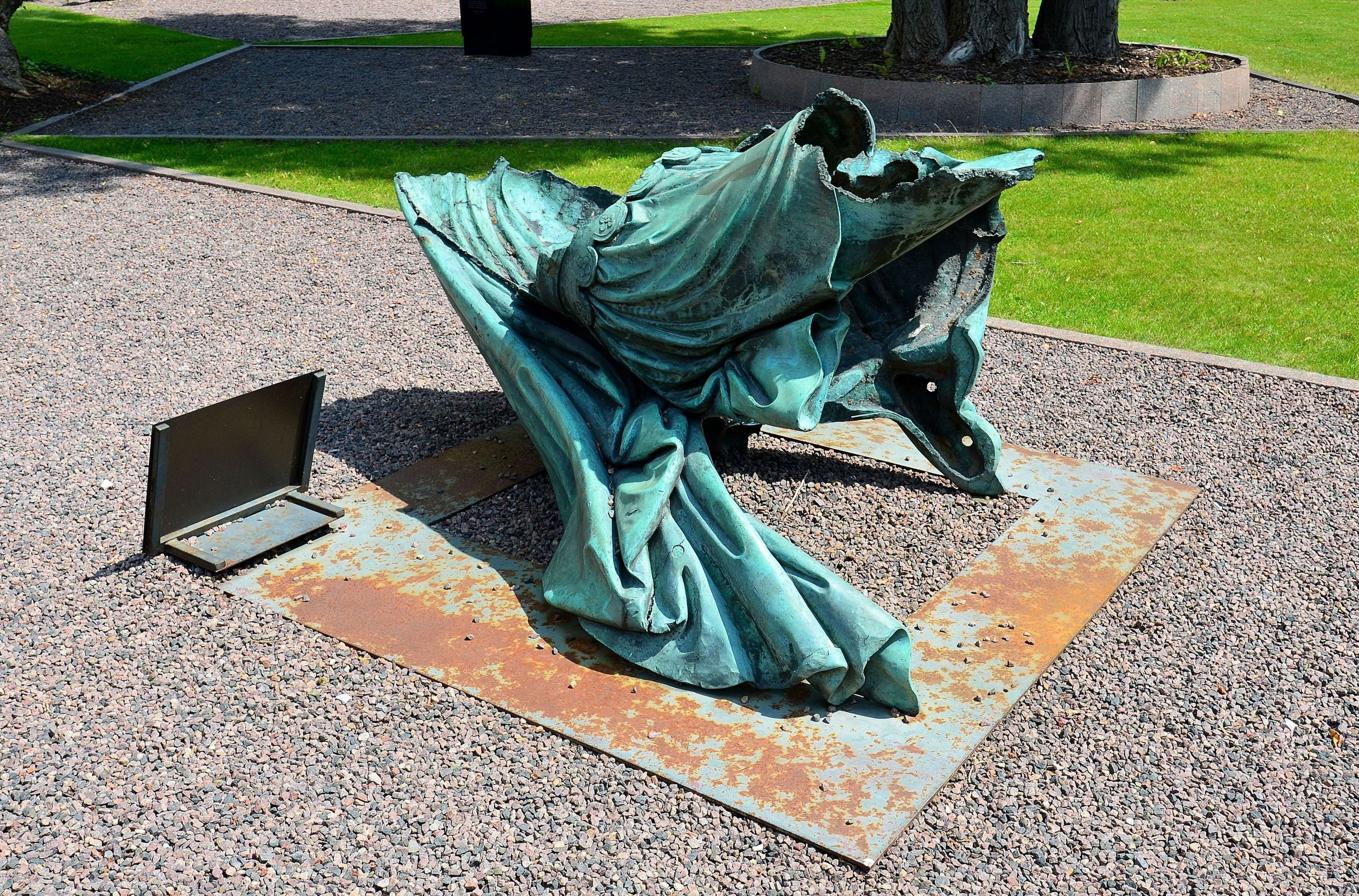
A fragment of the original statue in the Freedom Park at the Warsaw Uprising Museum

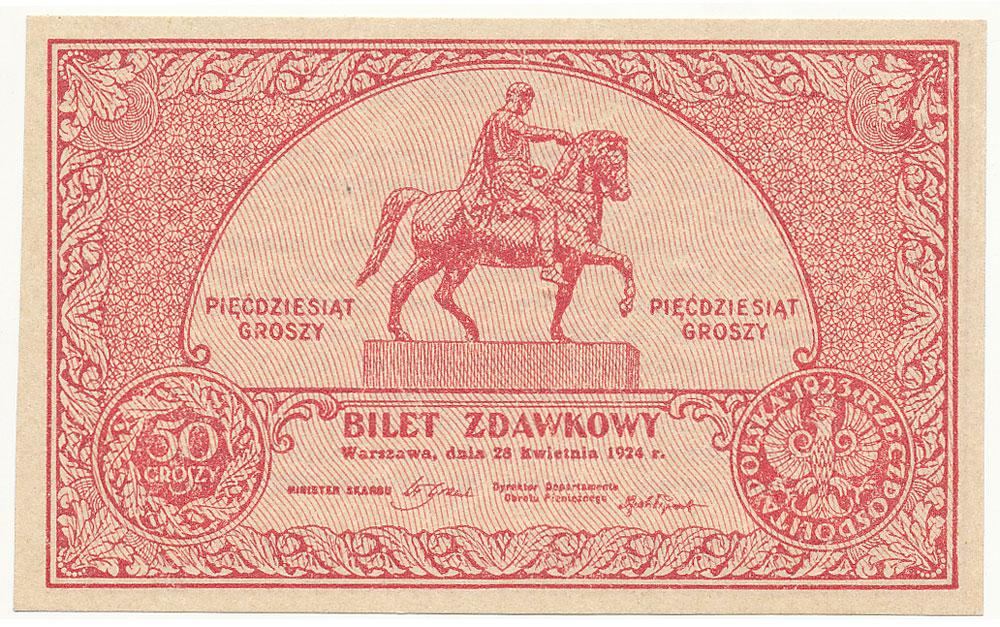
50 groszy banknote from 1924

== Bibliography ==
- Hanna Kotkowska-Bareja, Pomnik Poniatowskiego, Wydawnictwo PWN, Warszawa 1971

== See also ==
- Prince Józef Poniatowski Monument (Ujazdów), another monument in Warsaw dedicated to him
