= Ma Jisheng =

Chinese diplomat

- 马继生

Chinese Ambassador to Iceland
- In office December 2012 – September 2014
- Preceded by: Su Ge
- Succeeded by: Ma Weidong

Personal details
- Born: March 1, 1957 (age 69) Hebei, China
- Party: Chinese Communist Party
- Spouse: Zhong Yue
- Children: 1

Chinese name
- Traditional Chinese: 馬繼生
- Simplified Chinese: 马继生
Transcriptions
Standard Mandarin
- Hanyu Pinyin: Mǎ Jìshēng

Ma Jisheng (Chinese: 马继生; born 1 March 1957) is a former Chinese diplomat who served as Chinese Ambassador to Iceland between December 2012 and September 2014.

== Early life ==
Ma was born in Hebei province on March 1, 1957.

== Career ==
In 1988 he joined the Department of Asian Affairs, a department of the Ministry of Foreign Affairs. In 1991 he was assigned to the Chinese Embassy in Japan. He returned to China in 1995. In 2002 he was a counsellor at the Embassy of the People's Republic of China in the Republic of Indonesia. In 2004 he became counsellor and minister-counsellor at the Chinese Embassy in Japan. In 2008 he was promoted to become deputy director of the Information Department of the Ministry of Foreign Affairs. In 2012 he was appointed Chinese Ambassador to Iceland, succeeding Su Ge.

On January 8, 2014, Ma criticized the then Japanese Prime Minister Shinzo Abe for visiting the Yasukuni Shrine. In September 2014 he was arrested by the Ministry of State Security of the People's Republic of China for leaking state secrets to Japan.

== Personal life ==
Ma is married and has a daughter.

Diplomatic posts
Preceded by Su Ge	Chinese Ambassador to Iceland; 2012–2014	Succeeded by Zhang Weidong (张卫东)
