= Ding Guoyu =

Chinese diplomat

Ding Guoyu (Chinese: 丁国钰; June 1916 – May 11, 2015) was a Chinese diplomat.

== Early life ==
Ding was born in Jinzhai County, Anhui.

== Career ==
In 1955, Ding started his foreign service career as a Chinese diplomat. Ding was Ambassador of the People's Republic of China to Afghanistan (1955–1958), Pakistan (1960–1966) and Egypt (1982–1984).

Preceded by New office	Ambassador of China to Afghanistan; 1955–1958	Succeeded by Hao Ting
Preceded by Geng Biao	Ambassador of China to Pakistan; 1960–1966	Succeeded by Zhang Wenjin
Preceded by Liu Chun	Ambassador of China to Egypt; 1982–1984	Succeeded by
