= List of ambassadors of China to Iceland =

The ambassador of China to Iceland is the official representative of the People's Republic of China to Iceland.

== List of representatives ==
Name (English)	Name (Chinese)	Tenure begins	Tenure ends	Note
Chen Dong	陈东	September 1972	28 October 1977	
Chen Feng	陈枫	March 1978	21 May 1982	
Chen Luzhi	陈鲁直	September 1984	October 1987	
Zhang Longhai	张龙海	February 1988	October 1991	
Zheng Yaowen	郑耀文	November 1991	August 1995	
Wang Jianxing	王建兴	December 1995	February 1998	
Wang Ronghua	王荣华	March 1998	August 2002	
Jiang Zhengyun	蒋正云	August 2002	January 2005	
Wang Xinshi	王信石	January 2005	May 2007	
Zhang Keyuan	张克远	July 2007	July 2009	
Su Ge	苏格	September 2009	November 2012	
Ma Jisheng	马继生	December 2012	February 2014	
Zhang Weidong	张卫东	25 September 2014	November 2017	
Jin Zhijian	金智健	March 2018	September 2021	
He Rulong	何儒龙	February 2022		

== See also ==
- China–Iceland relations
