= Yuan Guisen =

Chinese diplomat

Yuan Guisen (Chinese: 苑桂森) (born 1955) is a Chinese diplomat. He was the Ambassador of the People's Republic of China to Slovakia (1999–2003), Poland (2003–2007), Ecuador (2011–2013) and the Bahamas (since 2013).

Preceded by Tao Miaofa	Ambassador of China to Slovakia; 1999–2003	Succeeded by
Preceded by Zhou Xiaopei	Ambassador of China to Poland; 2003–2007	Succeeded by Sun Rongmin
Preceded by Cai Runguo	Chinese Ambassador to Ecuador; 2011–2013	Succeeded by Wang Yulin
Preceded by	Ambassador of China to the Bahamas; 2013–present	Succeeded by incumbent
