= Gan Yetao =

Chinese diplomat

Gan Yetao (Chinese: 甘野陶) (1907–2002) was a Chinese diplomat. He was born in Wuhu, Anhui. He was Ambassador of the People's Republic of China to Finland (1959–1962), Afghanistan (1973–1976) and Madagascar (1979–1982).

Preceded by Chen Xinren	Ambassador of China to Finland; 1959–1962	Succeeded by
Preceded by Xie Bangzhi	Ambassador of China to Afghanistan; 1973–1976	Succeeded by Huang Mingda
Preceded by Tian Zhidong	Chinese Ambassador to Madagascar; 1979–1982	Succeeded by Dai Ping
