= Liu Jian (diplomat) =

Chinese diplomat

Liu Jian (Chinese: 刘健) (born January 1956) is a Chinese diplomat. He was born in Jiangsu. He was Ambassador of the People's Republic of China to Afghanistan (2005–2007), Malaysia (2008–2010) and Pakistan (2010–2013).

Preceded by Sun Yuxi	Ambassador of China to Afghanistan; 2005–2007	Succeeded by Yang Houlan
Preceded by Cheng Yonghua	Chinese Ambassador to Malaysia; 2008–2010	Succeeded by Chai Xi
Preceded by Luo Zhaohui	Chinese Ambassador to Pakistan; 2010–2013	Succeeded by
