= Sun Yuxi =

Chinese diplomat

- 孙玉玺
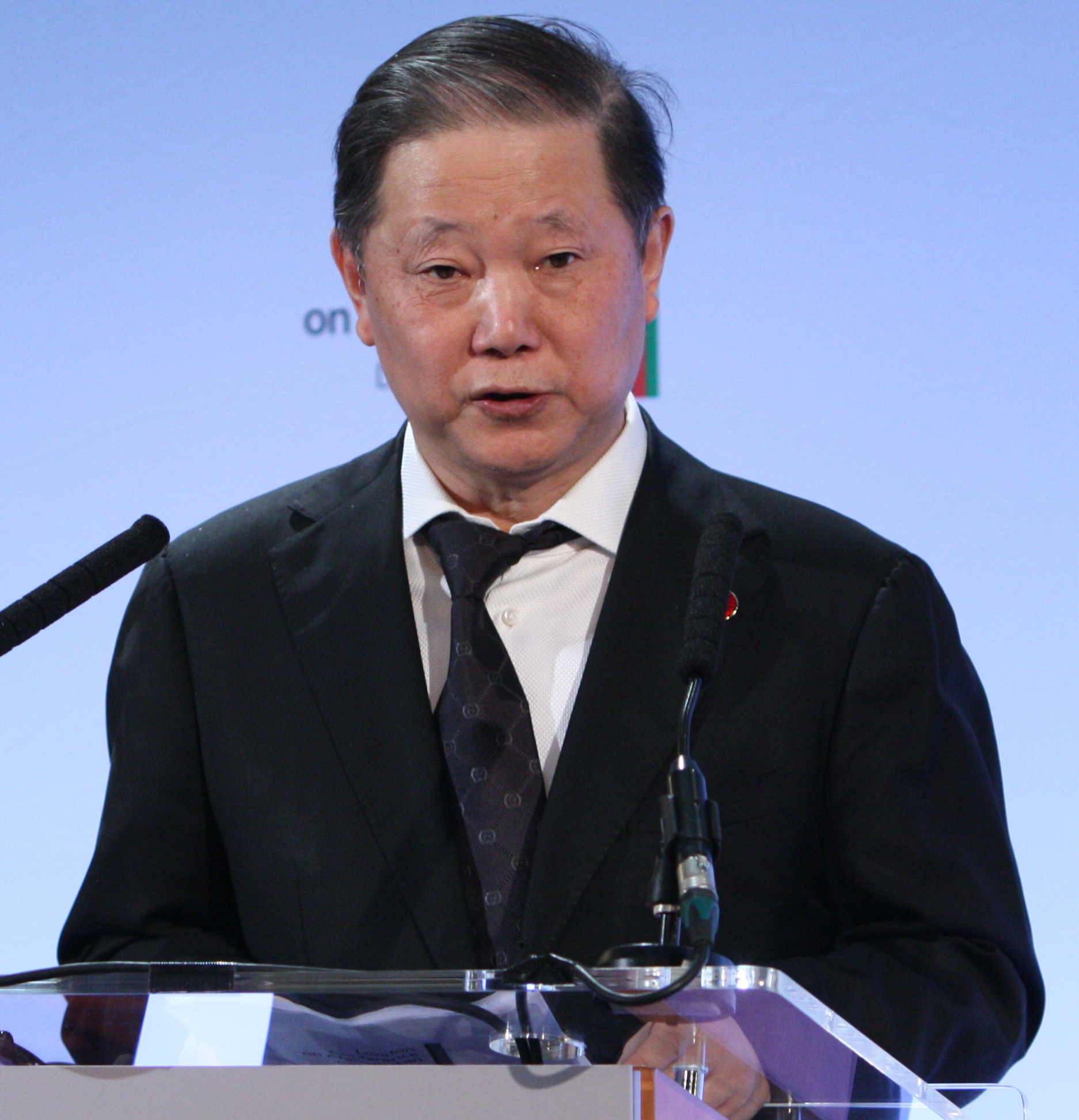
- Sun Yuxi in 2014

Chinese Ambassador to Poland
- In office 2010–2012
- Preceded by: Sun Rongmin
- Succeeded by: Xu Jian

Chinese Ambassador to Italy
- In office 2008–2010
- Preceded by: Dong Jinyi
- Succeeded by: Ding Wei

Chinese Ambassador to India
- In office 2005–2007
- Preceded by: Hua Junduo
- Succeeded by: Zhang Yan

Chinese Ambassador to Afghanistan
- In office 2002–2005
- Preceded by: Huang Mingda
- Succeeded by: Liu Jian

Deputy Director of the Foreign Ministry Information Department of China
- In office 1998–2002

Personal details
- Born: October 1951 (age 74–75) Harbin, Heilongjiang, China
- Education: Beijing Foreign Studies University; London School of Economics

Sun Yuxi (Chinese: 孙玉玺; pinyin: Sūn Yùxǐ) (born October 1951) is a Chinese diplomat. He was Ambassador of the People's Republic of China to Afghanistan (2002–2005), India (2005–2007), Italy (2008–2010) and Poland (2010–2012). He was spokesperson for the Ministry of Foreign Affairs of the People's Republic of China and deputy director of its information department.

== Early life ==
Sun was born on 1951 in Harbin. He studied at Harbin No. 3 Middle School and in 1973, he entered Beijing Foreign Studies University as a worker-peasant-soldier student to study English . After graduation, he was sent to the London School of Economics to study international relations.

== Diplomatic career ==
In 1979, following his entry into the Ministry of Foreign Affairs of China, Sun served as a staff member at the Chinese embassy in France. Between 1981 and 1988, he held various roles in the Asian Affairs Department of the ministry, progressing from staff member to third secretary, deputy director and first secretary. From 1988 to 1991, he served as director of the political section at the Chinese embassy in Pakistan, followed by a role from 1991 to 1993 as Assistant Representative to the Supreme National Council of Cambodia and counselor at the Chinese embassy in Cambodia. Between 1993 and 1995, he returned to the ministry as counselor and director in the Asian Affairs department. From 1995 to 1998, he was appointed counselor with the rank of ministry at the Chinese embassy in South Korea.

From 1998 to 2002, Sun served as deputy director-general of the Information Department and spokesperson for the ministry. In 2002, after disclosures that Chinese military had discovered that the interior of the presidential jet delivered to China from the United States contained listening devices, Sun stated that the case would not have any impact on other issues, which according to The New York Times, was an "effort to play down an episode that many had predicted would lead to a diplomatic crisis."

In 2002, he was appointed as the Ambassador Extraordinary and Plenipotentiary to the Islamic Republic of Afghanistan following the reopening of the Chinese embassy after the overthrow of Taliban following the United States invasion of Afghanistan in 2001. He served this position until 2004. In 2005, he was appointed as the Ambassador Extraordinary and Plenipotentiary to the Republic of India. In 2006, during an interview with Indian television prior to President of China Hu Jintao's visit to China, Sun asserted that the whole of Indian state of Arunachal Pradesh is Chinese territory. In response to Sun's remarks, Minister of External Affairs of India Pranab Mukherjee stated that Arunachal Pradesh is an integral part of India. In 2008, his tenure as ambassador to India ended and he was appointed as the Ambassador Extraordinary and Plenipotentiary to Italy and San Marino, a position which he served until 2010.

From 2010 to 2012, he served as the Ambassador Extraordinary and Plenipotentiary to the Republic of Poland. In July 2014, he was appointed special envoy of the ministry for Afghan Affairs. In September 2015, he resigned from the post.

== Personal life ==
Sun is married and has a daughter.

== Awards and decorations ==
- Grand Officer of the Order of the Star of Italian Solidarity (Italy, 2010)
- Commander's Cross of the Order of Merit of the Republic of Poland (Poland, 2012)

Diplomatic posts
| Preceded by vacant since 1979, before Huang Mingda | Ambassador of China to Afghanistan; 2002–2005 | Succeeded by Liu Jian |
| Preceded by Hua Junduo | Ambassador of China to India; 2005–2007 | Succeeded by Zhang Yan |
| Preceded by Dong Jinyi | Ambassador of China to Italy; 2008–2010 | Succeeded by Ding Wei |
| Preceded by Sun Rongmin | Ambassador of China to Poland; 2010–2012 | Succeeded by Xu Jian |
