= List of ambassadors of China to Sri Lanka =

Coordinates: 6.904430°N 79.871421°E

Ambassador of China to Sri Lanka
- Incumbent; Yang Yin since 26 February 2015
- Inaugural holder: Yang Mianhuang
- Formation: 1 April 1945; 81 years ago

The ambassador of China to Sri Lanka is the official representative of the People's Republic of China to the Democratic Socialist Republic of Sri Lanka.

== List of representatives ==
Diplomatic agrément/Diplomatic accreditation	Ambassador	Chinese language zh:中国驻斯里兰卡大使列表	Observations	Premier of the People's Republic of China	List of prime ministers of Sri Lanka	Term end
April 1, 1945	Yang Mianhuang	楊冕煌	On April 30, 1945, the Republic of China sent a consul to the British colony in Ceylon.; On February 4, 1948, Ceylon became independent, the Republic of China to continue to maintain consular relations.; On January 7, 1950, the Ceylon government recognized the People's Republic of China.	Chiang Kai-shek	Henry Monck-Mason Moore	January 7, 1950
February 7, 1957			The governments in Beijing and Colombo established diplomatic relations.	Zhou Enlai	S. W. R. D. Bandaranaike	
June 1, 1957	Zhang Canming	zh:张灿明	(* 1914 in Sichuan): From February 1952 to October 1955 he was deputy director of the All-China Federation of Trade Unions.; From July 1952 to October 1955 he was member of the Standing Committee of the China Branch, of the World Peace Council.; From October 1952 to October 1954 he was member of the Political and Legal Committee and concurrently deputy director in the Labor Department.; In April 1953 he was member of the Trade Union delegation to the first of May celebrations in Moscow.; From October 1955 to March 1957 he was director of consular affairs in the Ministry of Foreign Affairs of the People's Republic of China.; From June 1957 to August 1962 he was Ambassador in Colombo Ceylon.; From September 1963 to January 1967 he was Chinese Ambassador to Mongolia.; From March 1973 to July 1975 he was Chinese Ambassador to North Yemen.; From September 1975 to November 1978 he was Chinese Ambassador to Finland.	Zhou Enlai	S. W. R. D. Bandaranaike	August 1, 1962
September 1, 1962	Xie Kexi	zh:谢克西	*From September 1962 to December 1965 he was Ambassador in Colombo Ceylon and concurrently accredited in Malé (Maldives).: From March 1975 - April 1979 he was Chinese Ambassador to Niger.	Zhou Enlai	Sirimavo Bandaranaike	December 1, 1965
August 1, 1966	Yao Guang	zh:姚广		Zhou Enlai	S. W. R. D. Bandaranaike	September 1, 1969
October 1, 1969	Cao Keqiang	zh:曹克强		Zhou Enlai	Sirimavo Bandaranaike	June 1, 1970
July 1, 1970	Ma Ziqing	zh:马子卿	From June 1965 to December 1966 he was Chinese Ambassador to Mali.; From July 1970 to February 1973 he was Ambassador in Colombo Ceylon and in July 1972 he was concurrently accredited in Malé (Maldives).	Zhou Enlai	Dudley Shelton Senanayake	February 1, 1973
March 1, 1973	Huang Mingda	zh:黄明达	Also accredited in Malé (Maldives).	Zhou Enlai	Dudley Shelton Senanayake	May 1, 1977
September 1, 1977	Sun Shengwei	zh:孙盛渭	Also accredited in Malé (Maldives).: From August 1971 - May 1977 he was Chinese Ambassador to Kuwait.; From September 1977 - January 1981 he was Ambassador in Colombo and concurrently accredited in Malé (Maldives).; From May 1981 - January 1985 he was Chinese Ambassador to Finland.	Zhou Enlai	Sirimavo Bandaranaike	January 1, 1981
March 1, 1981	Gao E	zh:高鄂	Also accredited in Malé (Maldives).	Zhou Enlai	Sirimavo Bandaranaike	October 1, 1984
November 1, 1984	Zhou Shanyan	zh:周善延	Also accredited in Malé (Maldives).	Hua Guofeng	Junius Richard Jayawardene	June 1, 1987
September 1, 1987	Zhang Ruijie	zh:张瑞杰	From July 1985 - June 1987 he was Chinese Ambassador to Ethiopia.; September 1987 - August 1991 he was Ambassador in Colombo and concurrently accredited in Malé (Maldives).	Zhao Ziyang	Ranasinghe Premadasa	August 1, 1991
September 1, 1991	Zhang Lian	zh:张联	Also accredited in Malé (Maldives).	Zhao Ziyang	Ranasinghe Premadasa	December 1, 1993
December 1, 1993	Zhang Chengli	zh:张成礼	From September 1993 - February 1995 he was Ambassador in Colombo and concurrently accredited in Malé (Maldives).; From April 1995 - January 1999 he was Chinese Ambassador to Pakistan.	Li Peng	Ranasinghe Premadasa	February 1, 1995
March 1, 1995	Chen Defu	zh:陈德福	Also accredited in Malé (Maldives).	Li Peng	Dingiri Banda Wijetunga	May 1, 1999
June 1, 1999	Zhang Yun (PRC diplomat)	zh:张云 (外交官)	From June 1999 to June 2000 he was Ambassador in Colombo and concurrently accredited in Malé (Maldives).; From May 2004 - February 2007 he was Chinese Ambassador to Singapore.	Li Peng	Ranil Wickremesinghe	June 1, 2000
July 1, 2000	Jiang Qinzheng	zh:江勤政	Also accredited in Malé (Maldives).	Li Peng	Sirimavo Bandaranaike	February 1, 2003
April 1, 2003	Sun Guoxiang	zh:孙国祥	From April 2003 to November 2006 he was Ambassador in Colombo and concurrently accredited in Malé (Maldives).; From November 2006 to September 2008 he was Chinese Ambassador to Turkey.; November 2008 - September 2011 he was Chinese Ambassador to Vietnam.: From 2011 to December 2014 he was Chinese Consul General in New York.	Zhu Rongji	Sirimavo Bandaranaike	November 1, 2006
December 1, 2006	Ye Dabo	zh:叶大波	(*1956): From May 2004 - October 2006 he was Chinese Ambassador to Dominica.; From December 2006 - February 2009 he was Ambassador in Colombo and concurrently accredited in Malé (Maldives).; From January 2009 to September 2010 he was Chinese Ambassador to Myanmar.	Zhu Rongji	Ratnasiri Wickremanayake	February 1, 2009
February 1, 2009	Yang Xiuping	zh:杨秀萍	Graduated from Beijing Foreign Studies University.; From 1980 to 1985, he was admitted to the Information Department of the Ministry of Foreign Affairs; From 1985 to 1988, he was a member of the Office of the United Nations Office at Geneva, and then returned to the Information Department of the Ministry of Foreign Affairs, From 1988 to 1993, he was appointed as Deputy Secretary of the Ministry of Foreign Affairs (List of Ministry of Foreign Affairs of the People's Republic of China spokespersons); From 1993 to 1996, he was appointed to the United Nations Mission; 1996 to 1998 Ministry of Foreign Affairs News Division Secretary, Director, Counselor; From 1998 to 2002, he was Counselor and spokesman for the Commissioner of the Hong Kong Special Administrative Region.; From 2002 to 2004, he served as Consul General of the Chinese Consulate General in Auckland, New Zealand; From March 2002 to January 2005 he was Chinese Ambassador to Lithuania.; From February 2009 to June 2012 he was Ambassador in Colombo and concurrently accredited in Malé (Maldives).; From July 2012 to August 2015 he was the Chinese Ambassador to the Association of Southeast Asian Nations.	Wen Jiabao	Ranil Wickremesinghe	June 1, 2012
June 1, 2012	Wu Jianghao	吴江浩		Wen Jiabao	Ratnasiri Wickremanayake	January 1, 2015
February 26, 2015	Yi Xianliang	易先良		Li Keqiang	Ranil Wickremesinghe	
February 26, 2015	Yang Yin (PRC diplomat)		Charge D'affaires	Li Keqiang	Ranil Wickremesinghe	

== See also ==
- China–Sri Lanka relations
