= Sun Rongmin =

Chinese diplomat

Sun Rongmin (Chinese: 孙荣民) (born 1951) is a Chinese diplomat. In 1975 Sun graduated in German from the Beijing Foreign Languages Institute. He was Ambassador of the People's Republic of China to Luxembourg (2002–2007), Poland (2007–2010) and Slovenia (2010–2012).

Preceded by	Chinese Ambassador to Luxembourg; 2002–2007	Succeeded by
Preceded by Yuan Guisen	Ambassador of China to Poland; 2007–2010	Succeeded by Sun Yuxi
Preceded by	Ambassador of China to Slovenia; 2010–2012	Succeeded by
