= Hao Ting (diplomat) =

Chinese diplomat

Hao Ting (Chinese: 郝汀) was a Chinese diplomat. He was born in Dengzhou, Henan. He was Ambassador of the People's Republic of China to Afghanistan (1958–1965).

Preceded by Ding Guoyu	Ambassador of China to Afghanistan; 1958–1965	Succeeded by Chen Feng
