= Xie Bangzhi =

Chinese diplomat

Xie Bangzhi (Chinese: 谢邦治; 1916 – January 28, 2008) was a Chinese diplomat. He was born in Heilongjiang. He was Ambassador of the People's Republic of China to Bulgaria (1962–1967), Afghanistan (1969–1973), Upper Volta (1973–1978) and Finland (1979–1980). He was the President of Shanghai Jiao Tong University.

Preceded by Zhu Qiwen	Ambassador of China to Bulgaria; 1962–1967	Succeeded by Zhao Jin
Preceded by Chen Feng	Ambassador of China to Afghanistan; 1969–1973	Succeeded by Gan Yetao
Preceded by new office	Ambassador of China to Upper Volta; 1973–1978	Succeeded by Zhou Min
Preceded by Zhang Canming	Ambassador of China to Finland; 1979–1980	Succeeded by
