= Xu Ze =

Chinese politician

Xu Ze (Chinese: 徐泽) is a Chinese politician. He was born in October 1954, in Shantou, Guangdong, China with ancestry in Zhaoyuan, Shandong. In 1969, he joined the Chinese Communist Party. He graduated from Sun Yat-sen University in 1982.

He served in the People's Liberation Army in 1969, and later enrolled in Sun Yat-Sen University. After graduating in 1982, he worked in the Hong Kong and Macau Affairs Office. In July 2004, he served as deputy director of the Liaison Office of the Central People's Government in the Macao Special Administrative Region. In June 2013, he served as deputy director of the Hong Kong and Macao Affairs Office until April 2015.

In 2008, he was elected in the 11th Chinese People's Political Consultative Conference Standing Committee.
