= Chen Feng (diplomat) =

Chinese diplomat

Chen Feng (simplified Chinese: 陈枫; traditional Chinese: 陳楓; 1916–1986) was a Chinese diplomat. He was born in Yangshan County, Guangdong. He was Ambassador of the People's Republic of China to Afghanistan (1965–1969), Burundi (1972–1977), Iceland (1978–1982) and Mauritius (1982–1984).

== Biography ==
Chen Feng was born in 1916 in Xiaojiang Town in Yangshan County, Guangdong. His courtesy name was Wenxian (文贤), and he was also known as Zheping (哲平) and Guoliang (国梁). In August 1932, he moved to Guangzhou for his education. He became devoted to the Chinese Communist Revolution, discreetly reading publications from the Chinese Communist Party (CCP) and left-wing cultural circles. Chen studied at the Guangdong Guangya High School. After the school expelled him in July 1935, he returned to Yangshan, where he resumed his work opposing Japan. In May 1936, he became a member of the Communist Youth League of China. Chen moved for education to the CCP's Guangzhou division in October 1937. He began his studies at the Counter-Japanese Military and Political University in November 1937. In February 1938, he became a member of the CCP. Chen returned to Guangdong in June 1938.

Preceded by Hao Ting	Ambassador of China to Afghanistan; 1965–1969	Succeeded by Xie Bangzhi
Preceded by	Ambassador of China to Burundi; 1972–1977	Succeeded by
Preceded by Chen Dong	Ambassador of China to Iceland; 1978–1982	Succeeded by Ding Xuesong
Preceded by Wang Ruojie	Ambassador of China to Mauritius; 1982–1984	Succeeded by
