= Myślewice Palace =

Coordinates: 52°12′55″N 21°02′17″E

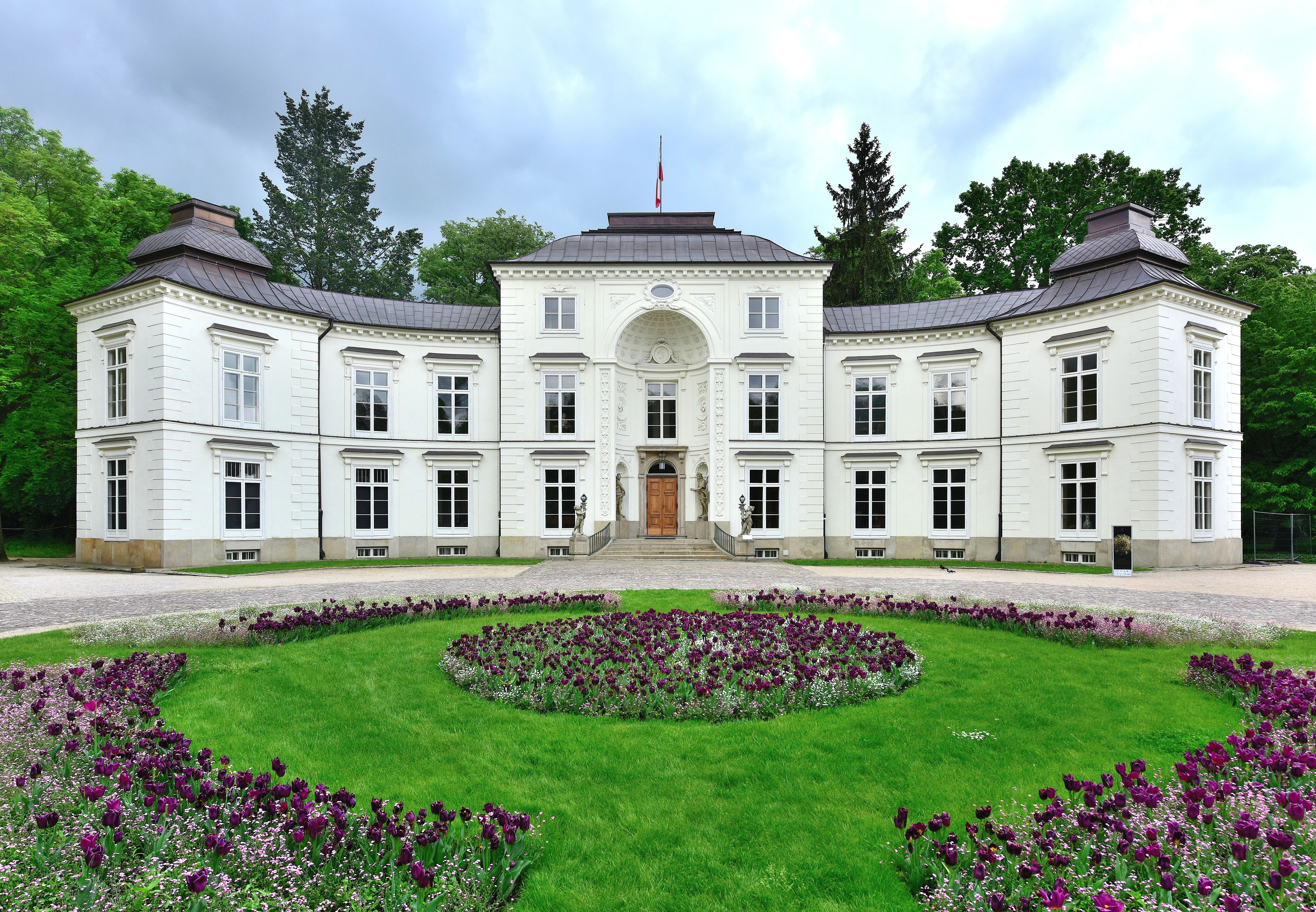
- Interactive map of the Myślewice Palace area

General information
- Architectural style: Rococo-Neoclassical
- Location: Warsaw, Poland
- Construction started: 1775
- Completed: 1779
- Client: Stanisław August Poniatowski

Design and construction
- Architect: Domenico Merlini

The Myślewice Palace (Polish: Pałac Myślewicki) is a rococo-neoclassical palace in Warsaw's Royal Baths Park, in Poland. It was created for King Stanisław August Poniatowski as one of the first buildings in the Royal Baths. Its name derives from that of the nearby now nonexistent village of Myślewice.

== History ==
Initially, the palace was inhabited by the king's courtiers and later by Józef Antoni Poniatowski, the king's nephew. The cartouche above the main entrance was decorated with his initials JP.

In the 19th century and during the People's Republic of Poland the palace served as a guest house and opened its doors to eminent guests such as Napoleon I and U.S. President Richard Nixon. On September 15, 1958, the first meeting of the ambassadors of the People's Republic of China and the United States took place in the palace, which is considered the first attempt to establish contacts between the two countries and resulted in the establishment of diplomatic relations between the two countries.

The facade is adorned with a huge shell-bowl with sculptures by Jakub Monaldi depicting Zephyr and Flora, while the mild warping of the roof refers to the popular Chinese designs Large parts of the original interior furnishings survived the last world war - including paintings by Jan Bogumił Plersch from 1778 and Antoni Gerżabka as well as stucco decorations and sculptures. Particularly valuable are the Dining Room with views of Rome and Venice and the Bathroom with a plafond by Plersch depicting Zephyr and Flora

== See also ==
- Neoclassical architecture in Poland
