= Zeng Yongquan =

Chinese diplomat

Zeng Yongquan (Chinese: 曾涌泉) (1902–1996) was a Chinese diplomat. He was born in Xindu District, Chengdu, Sichuan. He was a graduate of Beijing Foreign Studies University. He was Ambassador of People's Republic of China to Poland (1952–1955), East Germany (1955–1957) and Romania (March–October 1966). He was a vice-minister of the Ministry of Foreign Affairs of the People's Republic of China. He was a member of the Standing Committee of the Chinese People's Political Consultative Conference.

Preceded by Peng Mingzhi	Ambassador of China to Poland; 1952–1955	Succeeded by
Preceded by Ji Pengfei	Ambassador of China to East Germany; 1955–1957	Succeeded by Wang Guoquan
Preceded by Liu Fang	Ambassador of China to Romania; March–October 1966	Succeeded by Zhang Haifeng
