= Li Junhua =

Chinese politician and diplomat (born 1962)

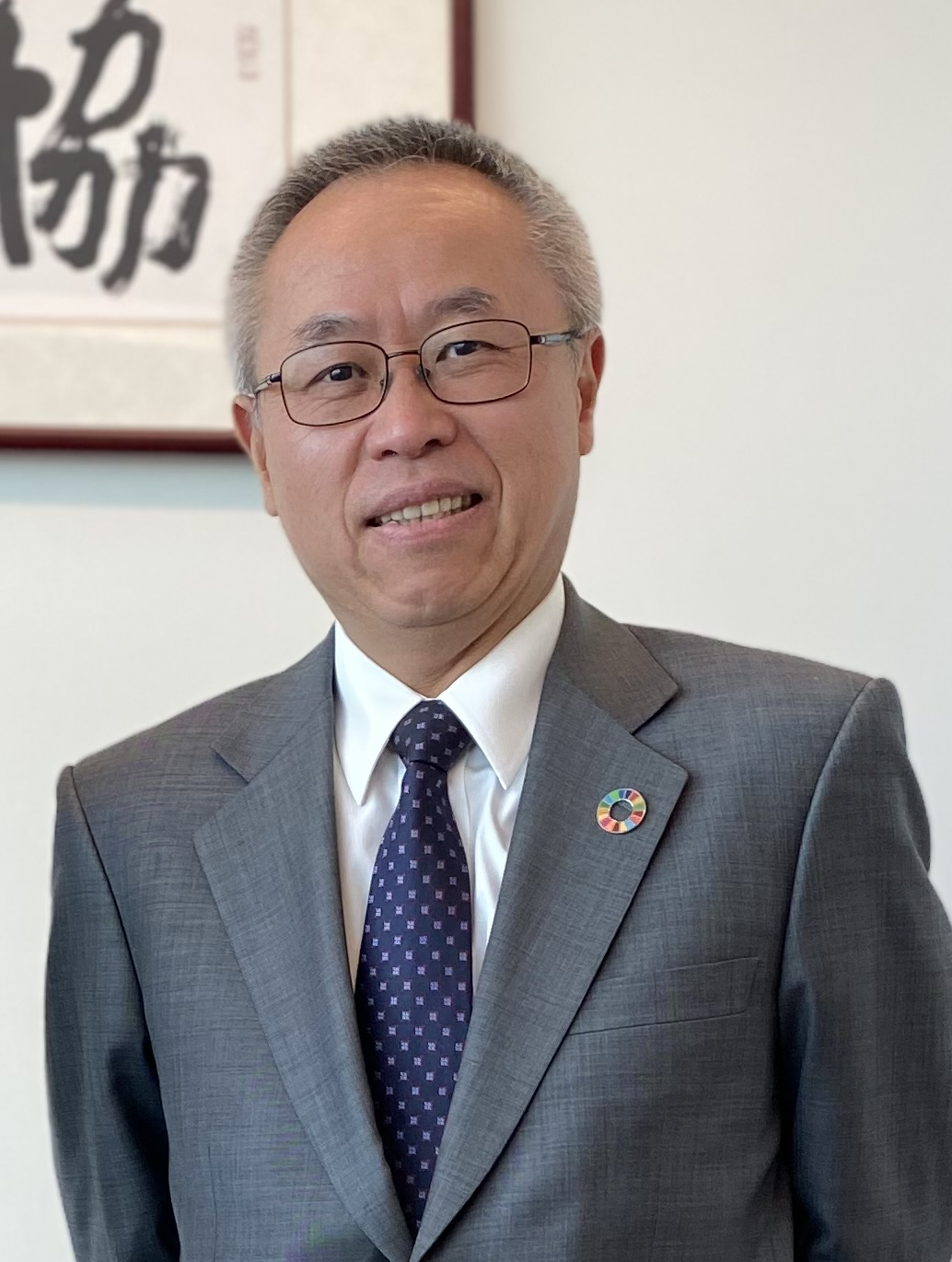
Li in 2023

Li Junhua (Chinese: 李军华; born August 1962) is a Chinese politician and diplomat, currently serving as Under-Secretary-General for Economic and Social Affairs at the United Nations.

== Biography ==
Li holds a master's degree in international public policy from Johns Hopkins University in the United States.

In 1985, he joined the Ministry of Foreign Affairs of the People's Republic of China, where he served successively in the Department of International Affairs, the Permanent Mission to the United Nations Economic and Social Commission for Asia and the Pacific (ESCAP), and the Permanent Mission to the United Nations. In 2001, he was appointed director of the Department of International Organizations within the Ministry of Foreign Affairs. In 2003, he served as a counsellor at the Permanent Mission of the People's Republic of China to the United Nations, subsequently rising to minister-counsellor. In 2008, he assumed the role of deputy director-general of the Department of International Organizations. In 2010, he succeeded Ye Dabo as China's ambassador to Myanmar.

In February 2013, he assumed the role of director-general of the Department of International Organizations at the Ministry of Foreign Affairs. In 2019, he succeeded Li Ruiyu (李瑞宇) as China's ambassador to Italy and concurrently to San Marino.

In July 2022, United Nations Secretary-General António Guterres appointed Li Under-Secretary-General for Economic and Social Affairs; he took office on 30 August 2022, succeeding Liu Zhenmin. In that role he heads the Department of Economic and Social Affairs (UNDESA) and has responsibility for coordinating the Secretariat's support for 2030 Agenda follow-up processes and for overseeing the meetings of the General Assembly's Second and Third Committees and the meetings of the Economic and Social Council (ECOSOC) and its subsidiary organs.

In June 2025, Li was the secretary-general of the Third UN Ocean Conference, held in Nice, France, and in June–July 2025, he held the same position at the UN's 4th International Conference on Financing for Development, held in Seville, Spain.
