= Wang Guoquan =

Chinese diplomat (1911-2004)

Wang Guoquan (Chinese: 王国权) (1911–2004) was a Chinese diplomat. He was the first PRC ambassador to Australia.

He was born in Gongyi, Henan. He was a graduate of Henan University. He was governor, Chinese Communist Party Committee Secretary and delegate to the National People's Congress from Rehe Province. He was a delegate to the 1st National People's Congress (1954–1959), 2nd National People's Congress (1959–1964), 3rd National People's Congress (1964–1975) and 6th National People's Congress (1983–1988). He was Ambassador of the People's Republic of China to East Germany (1956–1964), Poland (1964–1970), Australia (1973–1975) and Italy (1977–1978).

Preceded by Zeng Yongquan	Ambassador of China to East Germany; 1956–1964	Succeeded by Zhang Haifeng
Preceded by Wang Bingnan	Ambassador of China to Poland; 1964–1970	Succeeded by Yao Guang
Preceded by new office	Ambassador of China to Australia; 1973–1975	Succeeded by Zhou Qiuye
Preceded by Han Kehua	Ambassador of China to Italy; 1977–1978	Succeeded by
