= Embassy of China, Hanoi =

Diplomatic mission of the People's Republic of China in Vietnam

Embassy of China in Hanoi Chinese: 中國駐越南大使館 Vietnamese: Đại sứ quán Trung Quốc tại Việt Nam
- Location: Ba Đình district, Hanoi, Vietnam
- Address: 46 Hoàng Diệu St., Ba Đình District, Hanoi
- Coordinates: 21°01′56″N 105°50′18″E
- Ambassador: Xiong Bo
- Website: vn.china-embassy.gov.cn/chn/

Embassy of China in Hanoi (Chinese: 中國駐越南大使館; Vietnamese: Đại sứ quán Trung Quốc tại Việt Nam) is the official diplomatic mission of the People's Republic of China in the Socialist Republic of Vietnam. The embassy was opened in 1954, and the current ambassador is He Wei.

== History ==
Following the Chinese Communist Revolution at home, China established their embassy to Vietnam on a hill in Đại Từ district, Thái Nguyên province, since Hanoi was unavailable at the time due to the First Indochina War. It was here that China's first ambassador to Vietnam, Luo Guibo, submitted his credentials to Ho Chi Minh.

On August 25, 1954, after Vietnamese victory in the war, China decided to establish an embassy in Hanoi proper. Ho Chi Minh allowed the Chinese delegation to freely choose a location anywhere in Hanoi and report back to him. The current site of the Chinese Embassy was originally the official residence of Hoàng Trọng Phu, a former minister of French Tonkin. The selection was soon approved by Ho Chi Minh.

== List of ambassadors ==
Diplomatic agrément/Diplomatic accreditation	Ambassador	Chinese language zh:中国驻越南大使列表	Observations	Premier of the Republic of China	List of heads of state of Vietnam	Term end
February 13, 1941	Lin Jiamin	林珈民	Chargé d'affaires of the government in Nanjing to the Japanese occupation troops in Huế.	Wang Jingwei	Bảo Đại	
January 1, 1944	Zhang Yongfu	zh:张永福	Chargé d'affaires of the government in Nanjing to the Japanese occupation troops in Huế. (born 1872 in Singapore- 1957)	Wang Jingwei	Bảo Đại	
March 11, 1945			The Japanese occupation force declared an Empire of Vietnam independent from the Fédération indochinoise.	Wang Jingwei	Bảo Đại	
August 25, 1945			The Vietnamese Empire announced the throne abdication.	Chen Gongbo	Bảo Đại	
August 30, 1945			In Huế the Vietnamese Empire celebrated its throne abdication ceremony.	Chen Gongbo	Bảo Đại	

Diplomatic agrément/Diplomatic accreditation	Ambassador	Chinese language zh:中国驻越南大使列表	Observations	Premier of the People's Republic of China	Prime Minister of Vietnam	Term end
September 2, 1945			In Hanoi a provisional Government of North Vietnam was established.	Zhou Enlai	Hồ Chí Minh	
January 18, 1950			The governments in Hanoi and Beijing established diplomatic relations.; In 1954, after the First Indochina War, China set up an embassy in Hanoi.	Zhou Enlai	Hồ Chí Minh	
November 9, 1954	Luo Guibo	zh:罗贵波	former head of China's Vietnamese political advisers.	Zhou Enlai	Hồ Chí Minh	September 1, 1957
January 1, 1958	He Wei	zh:何伟		Zhou Enlai	Phạm Văn Đồng	April 1, 1962
April 1, 1962	Zhu Qiwen	zh:朱其文		Zhou Enlai	Phạm Văn Đồng	May 1, 1969
June 1, 1969	Wang Youping	zh:王幼平		Zhou Enlai	Phạm Văn Đồng	August 1, 1974
September 1, 1974	Fu Hao (diplomat)	zh:符浩		Zhou Enlai	Phạm Văn Đồng	April 1, 1977
September 1, 1977	Chen Zhifang	zh:陈志方		Hua Guofeng	Phạm Văn Đồng	June 1, 1978
December 1, 1978	Yang Gongsu	zh:杨公素		Hua Guofeng	Phạm Văn Đồng	May 1, 1980
February 17, 1979			Sino-Vietnamese War	Hua Guofeng	Phạm Văn Đồng	March 16, 1979
December 1, 1980	Qiu Lixing	zh:邱力行		Zhao Ziyang	Phạm Văn Đồng	August 1, 1985
September 1, 1985	Li Shichun	zh:李世淳		Zhao Ziyang	Phạm Văn Đồng	April 1, 1989
December 1, 1988	Zhang Dewei	zh:张德维		Li Peng	Võ Văn Kiệt	February 1, 1993
December 1, 1992	Zhang Qing	zh:张青 (外交官)		Li Peng	Võ Văn Kiệt	December 1, 1995
December 1, 1995	Li Jiazhong	zh:李家忠		Li Peng	Võ Văn Kiệt	July 1, 2000
July 1, 2000	Qi Jianguo	zh:齐建国		Zhu Rongji	Phan Văn Khải	February 1, 2006
March 1, 2006	Hu Qianwen	zh:胡乾文		Wen Jiabao	Nguyễn Tấn Dũng	November 1, 2008
November 1, 2008	Sun Guoxiang	zh:孙国祥		Wen Jiabao	Nguyễn Tấn Dũng	September 1, 2011
September 1, 2011	Gong Hyeon-U	zh:孔铉佑		Wen Jiabao	Nguyễn Tấn Dũng	May 1, 2014
May 1, 2014	Hong Xiaoyong	zh:洪小勇		Li Keqiang	Nguyễn Tấn Dũng	November 2018
November 2018	Xiong Bo	zh:熊波		Li Keqiang	Nguyễn Xuân Phúc	

== See also ==
- China–Vietnam relations
- Embassy of Vietnam, Beijing
- List of diplomatic missions of China
- List of diplomatic missions in Vietnam
