= List of ambassadors of China to Vietnam =

Coordinates: 21.032264°N 105.838084°E

Ambassador of China to Vietnam
- 中国驻越南大使
- National emblem of China

- Flag of China
- Incumbent; He Wei since August 2024
- Ministry of Foreign Affairs; Embassy of China, Hanoi
- Appointer: The president pursuant to a decision of the National People's Congress Standing Committee
- Website: Chinese Embassy – Hanoi

The ambassador of China to Vietnam is the official representative of the People's Republic of China to the Socialist Republic of Vietnam.

== List of representatives ==
Diplomatic agrément/Diplomatic accreditation	Ambassador	Chinese language zh:中国驻越南大使列表	Observations	Premier of the Republic of China	List of heads of state of Vietnam	Term end
February 13, 1941	Lin Jiamin	林珈民	Chargé d'affaires of the government in Nanjing to the Japanese occupation troops in Huế.	Wang Jingwei	Bảo Đại	
January 1, 1944	Zhang Yongfu	zh:张永福	Chargé d'affaires of the government in Nanjing to the Japanese occupation troops in Huế. (born 1872 in Singapore- 1957)	Wang Jingwei	Bảo Đại	
March 11, 1945			The Japanese occupation force declared an Empire of Vietnam independent from the Fédération indochinoise.	Wang Jingwei	Bảo Đại	
August 25, 1945			The Vietnamese Empire announced the throne abdication.	Chen Gongbo	Bảo Đại	
August 30, 1945			In Huế the Vietnamese Empire celebrated its throne abdication ceremony.	Chen Gongbo	Bảo Đại	

Diplomatic agrément/Diplomatic accreditation	Ambassador	Chinese language zh:中国驻越南大使列表	Observations	Premier of the People's Republic of China	Prime Minister of Vietnam	Term end
September 2, 1945			In Hanoi a provisional Government of North Vietnam was established.	Zhou Enlai	Hồ Chí Minh	
January 18, 1950			The governments in Hanoi and Beijing established diplomatic relations.; In 1954, after the First Indochina War, China set up an embassy in Hanoi.	Zhou Enlai	Hồ Chí Minh	
November 9, 1954	Luo Guibo	zh:罗贵波	former head of China's Vietnamese political advisers.	Zhou Enlai	Hồ Chí Minh	September 1, 1957
January 1, 1958	He Wei	zh:何伟		Zhou Enlai	Phạm Văn Đồng	April 1, 1962
April 1, 1962	Zhu Qiwen	zh:朱其文		Zhou Enlai	Phạm Văn Đồng	May 1, 1969
June 1, 1969	Wang Youping	zh:王幼平		Zhou Enlai	Phạm Văn Đồng	August 1, 1974
September 1, 1974	Fu Hao (diplomat)	zh:符浩		Zhou Enlai	Phạm Văn Đồng	April 1, 1977
September 1, 1977	Chen Zhifang	zh:陈志方		Hua Guofeng	Phạm Văn Đồng	June 1, 1978
December 1, 1978	Yang Gongsu	zh:杨公素		Hua Guofeng	Phạm Văn Đồng	May 1, 1980
February 17, 1979			Sino-Vietnamese War	Hua Guofeng	Phạm Văn Đồng	March 16, 1979
December 1, 1980	Qiu Lixing	zh:邱力行		Zhao Ziyang	Phạm Văn Đồng	August 1, 1985
September 1, 1985	Li Shichun	zh:李世淳		Zhao Ziyang	Phạm Văn Đồng	April 1, 1989
December 1, 1988	Zhang Dewei	zh:张德维		Li Peng	Võ Văn Kiệt	February 1, 1993
December 1, 1992	Zhang Qing	zh:张青 (外交官)		Li Peng	Võ Văn Kiệt	December 1, 1995
December 1, 1995	Li Jiazhong	zh:李家忠		Li Peng	Võ Văn Kiệt	July 1, 2000
July 1, 2000	Qi Jianguo	zh:齐建国		Zhu Rongji	Phan Văn Khải	February 1, 2006
March 1, 2006	Hu Qianwen	zh:胡乾文		Wen Jiabao	Nguyễn Tấn Dũng	November 1, 2008
November 1, 2008	Sun Guoxiang	zh:孙国祥		Wen Jiabao	Nguyễn Tấn Dũng	September 1, 2011
September 1, 2011	Gong Hyeon-U	zh:孔铉佑		Wen Jiabao	Nguyễn Tấn Dũng	May 1, 2014
May 1, 2014	Hong Xiaoyong	zh:洪小勇		Li Keqiang	Nguyễn Tấn Dũng	November 2018
November 2018	Xiong Bo	zh:熊波		Li Keqiang	Nguyễn Xuân Phúc	

== South Vietnam ==
The Chinese ambassador to South Vietnam was the official representative of the Republic of China to the Republic of Vietnam.

=== List of representatives (South Vietnam) ===
Diplomatic agrément/Diplomatic accreditation	Ambassador	Chinese language zh:中国驻越南大使列表	Observations	List of premiers of the Republic of China	List of heads of state of Vietnam	Term end
October 26, 1955			Establishment of the Republic of Vietnam (South Vietnam).	Yu Hung-Chun	Ngo Dinh Diem	
December 1, 1956	Yuan Zijian	zh:袁子健	The Consulate General of the Republic of China in Saigon was upgraded to a mission.	Yu Hung-Chun	Ngo Dinh Diem	July 1, 1958
January 1, 1957			The Taiwanese Mission in Saigon was upgraded to the embassy, the minister Yuan Zijian was promoted to ambassador.	Yu Hung-Chun	Ngo Dinh Diem	
July 1, 1958	Yuan Zijian	zh:袁子健		Chen Cheng	Ngo Dinh Diem	October 1, 1964
October 1, 1964	Hu Lien	zh:胡琏	A huge plastic bomb was set off in the Chinese Embassy at Saigon.	Yen Chia-kan	Phan Khắc Sửu	December 1, 1972
October 1, 1964	Tchen Heou-jou	陳厚儒	Chargé d'affaires (born 1912 in Jiangsu): married to Ting Mo-hsien; 4 sons, 1 daughter.; Lic. laws Aurora University (Shanghai).; 1940–1942 Sect. Mem., MOFA.; 1942–1946 Attaché, Ch. Emb., Teheran.; 1946–1955 Vice Consul, in charge of the Consulate in Haiphong.; 1955–1957 Sect. Chief, MOFA.; 1957–1960 Consul Gen., Tahiti.; 1960–1964 Counsl. Chargé d'affaires Emb., Senegal.; 1964–1966 Min., Emb., Vietnam.; In 1966 he was designated Ambassador of China to Benin and was retired.	Yen Chia-kan	Phan Khắc Sửu	January 1, 1966
December 1, 1972	Hsu Shao-chang	许绍昌	(born 1913 in Zhejiang ): graduated of the Central Political Institute in Nanjing.; He served as political vice minister of foreign affairs, minister of the Chinese Embassy in Washington and ambassador to Brazil, Italy, Malta and Argentina.; Also named to serve in Vietnam was Dr. Lo Tsung-chueh, a senior specialist of the Joint Commission on Rural Reconstruction who became chief of the Chinese Agricultural and Technical Mission. Lo replaced Chang Lien-chun, who was invited by the Guam government to assist in its agricultural development program. Chang had served in Vietnam since 1963. Lo is a plant pathologist and served in Vietnam as crop and animal husbandry section chief of the mission.	Chiang Ching-kuo	Phan Khắc Sửu	April 1, 1975
April 30, 1975			Fall of Saigon the Taiwanese Embassy was closed.	Chiang Ching-kuo	Nguyễn Hữu Thọ	
May 1, 1973	Wang Ruojie	zh:王若杰	(born 1914 in Zouping County): In 1955 he became Major General of the People's Liberation Army.; From May 1964 – December 1972 he was Chinese Ambassador to Yemen (North Yemen).; In 1973 he was appointed ambassador to the Provisional Revolutionary Government of the Republic of Vietnam.; From September 1977 to August 1982he was Chinese Ambassador to Mauritius.; In 1976 South Vietnam and North Vietnam merged to form the Vietnamese Socialist Republic.	Zhou Enlai	Phạm Văn Đồng	November 1, 1976

== See also ==
- China–Vietnam relations
- Taiwan–Vietnam relations
- Taipei Economic and Cultural Office, Ho Chi Minh City
