= Embassy of China, Islamabad =

Diplomatic mission of China in Islamabad, Pakistan

Embassy of the People's Republic of China in the Islamic Republic of Pakistan
- 中华人民共和国驻巴基斯坦伊斯兰共和国大使馆
- Location: Islamabad, Pakistan
- Address: No. 1 Zhou Enlai Avenue, Diplomatic Enclave, Islamabad
- Coordinates: 33.734°N 73.136°E
- Opened: 16 June 2015
- Ambassador: Jiang Zaidong
- Website: Embassy of the People's Republic of China in the Islamic Republic of Pakistan

The Embassy of the People's Republic of China in the Islamic Republic of Pakistan is the diplomatic mission of the People's Republic of China in Pakistan, located at No. 1 Zhou Enlai Avenue, Diplomatic Enclave, Islamabad.

== History ==
The current embassy building was officially opened on 16 June 2015. At the time of its opening, it was reported to be China's largest diplomatic mission overseas.

In December 2019, China announced it would gift its former embassy building, also located within the Diplomatic Enclave, to Pakistan. The building was to be transferred to Pakistan's Ministry of Foreign Affairs following full renovation, with China undertaking to bear all renovation costs. Pakistan's then-Foreign Minister Shah Mehmood Qureshi visited the building and, in a meeting with the Chinese Ambassador Yao Jung, conveyed the thanks of Prime Minister Imran Khan for the gesture. The building was reported to be intended for use by the Foreign Service Academy of Pakistan.

== List of recent ambassadors ==
- Yao Jing (2019 – 2023)
- Jiang Zaidong (2023 – present)
