= List of ambassadors of China to Pakistan =

Coordinates: 33.734366°N 73.135800°E

Ambassador of China to Pakistan
- Incumbent; Jiang Zaidong since September 2023
- Inaugural holder: Han Nianlong
- Formation: September 1951; 75 years ago

The ambassador of China to Pakistan is the official representative of the People's Republic of China to the Islamic Republic of Pakistan.

== List of representatives ==
| Diplomatic agrément/Diplomatic accreditation | Ambassador | Chinese language zh:中国驻巴基斯坦大使列表 | Observations | Premier of the People's Republic of China | List of prime ministers of Pakistan | Term end |
|---|---|---|---|---|---|---|
| May 21, 1951 | | | The governments in Karachi and Beijing established diplomatic relations | Zhou Enlai | Liaquat Ali Khan | |
| September 1951 | Han Nianlong | zh:韩念龙 | | Zhou Enlai | Liaquat Ali Khan | February 1956 |
| March 1956 | Geng Biao | zh:耿飚 | | Zhou Enlai | Iskander Mirza | October 1959 |
| January 1960 | Ding Guoyv | zh:丁国钰 | | Zhou Enlai | Ayub Khan (general) | July 1966 |
| August 1966 | Zhang Wenjin | zh:章文晋 | | Zhou Enlai | Ayub Khan (general) | January 1967 |
| June 1969 | Zhang Tong | zh:張彤 | | Zhou Enlai | Agha Muhammad Yahya Khan | August 1974 |
| September 1974 | Lu Weizhao | zh:陸維釗 | | Zhou Enlai | Fazal Ilahi Chaudhry | April 1979 |
| August 1979 | Xu Yixing | zh:徐以新 | | Hua Guofeng | Mohammed Zia ul-Haq | April 1982 |
| July 1982 | Wang Chuanbin | zh:王传斌 | | Zhao Ziyang | Mohammed Zia ul-Haq | November 1986 |
| December 1986 | Tian Ding | zh:田丁 | | Zhao Ziyang | Mohammed Zia ul-Haq | April 1991 |
| May 1991 | Zhou Gang | zh:周刚 | | Li Peng | Ghulam Ishaq Khan | March 1995 |
| April 1995 | Zhang Chengli | zh:张成礼 | (*1937): From September 1993 to February 1995 he was ambassador in Colombo Sri Lanka.; From April 1995 to January 1999 he was ambassador in Islamabad (Pakistan) | Li Peng | Faruk Ahmad Khan Leghari | January 1999 |
| January 1999 | Lu Shulin | zh:陆树林 | | Zhu Rongji | Mohammed Rafiq Tarar | April 2002 |
| April 2002 | Zhang Chunxiang | zh:张春祥 | | Zhu Rongji | Pervez Musharraf | February 2007 |
| March 2007 | Luo Zhaohui | zh:罗照辉 | (* February 1962): From March 2007 to June 2010 he was ambassador in Islamabad Pakistan.; From May 2014 to September 2016 he was ambassador in Ottawa Canada.; Since September 2016 he is ambassador in New Delhi (India). | Wen Jiabao | Pervez Musharraf | June 2010 |
| July 2010 | Liu Jian (diplomat) | zh:刘健 (外交官) | | Wen Jiabao | Asif Ali Zardari | May 2013 |
| June 2013 | Sun Weidong | 孙卫东 | | Li Keqiang | Nawaz Sharif | October 2017 |
| November 2017 | Yao Jing | 姚敬 | | Li Keqiang | Shahid Khaqan Abbasi | September 2020 |
| November 3, 2020 | Nong Rong | zh:农融 | | Li Keqiang | Imran Khan | January 2023 |
| September 2023 | Jiang Zaidong | 姜再冬 | | Li Qiang | Anwaar-ul-Haq Kakar (caretaker PM) | Incumbent |
