= List of ambassadors of China to Palestine =

The Chinese ambassador to Palestine is the official representative of the People's Republic of China to Palestine.

== List of representatives ==
=== Ambassador of the People's Republic of China to Palestine (1990-2008) ===
On 20 December 1988, the People's Republic of China announced its recognition of the State of Palestine and established diplomatic relations with it. Starting 5 July 1990, the Chinese Ambassador to Tunisia also served as Ambassador to Palestine. After April 2008, the Chinese Ambassador to Tunisia ceased to serve as Ambassador to the State of Palestine. All matters concerning relations with Palestine were fully handled by the Office of the Chinese Mission to the Palestinian National Authority.

Designated	Ambassador	Chinese name	Description	Chinese Premier	Palestinian Prime Minister	Term end
March 1987	Zhu Yinglu	朱应鹿	From 1988 to 1991 he was also ambassador to Algeria	Li Peng	Zine el-Abidine Ben Ali	October 1991
September 1991	An Huihou	安惠侯		Li Peng	Hamed Karoui	August 1993
July 1993	Wu Chuanfu	吴传福		Li Peng	Hamed Karoui	March 1998
May 1997	Lv Guozeng	吕国增		Li Peng	Hamed Karoui	July 2000
April 2000	Mu Wen	穆文		Zhu Rongji	Mohamed Ghannouchi	December 2001
October 2001	Zhu Bangzao	朱邦造		Zhu Rongji	Mohamed Ghannouchi	August 2003
June 2003	Liu Yuhe	刘玉和		Wen Jiabao	Mohamed Ghannouchi	April 2008

=== Director of the Office of the People's Republic of China to the Palestinian National Authority and the State of Palestine (1995-present) ===
Following the establishment of Palestinian self-rule, China opened its Office to the Palestinian National Authority in the Gaza Strip in December 1995. In May 2004, the office relocated to Ramallah. Starting in June 2008, the Chinese Ambassador to Tunisia ceased to concurrently serve as Ambassador to the State of Palestine, with the Office of the Palestinian National Authority assuming full responsibility for all diplomatic engagements with Palestine. In October 2013, the Office of the Palestinian National Authority was renamed the Office of the People's Republic of China in the State of Palestine.

Designated	Ambassador	Chinese name	Description	Chinese Premier	Palestinian Prime Minister	Term end
December 1995	Zheng Xiaolong	郑小龙		Li Peng	Yasser Arafat	June 1997
June 1997	Liu Zhihai	刘志海		Li Peng	Yasser Arafat	July 1999
February 2000	Wu Jiuhong	吴久洪	From February 2000 to November 2002 he was in charge of the Office at the Palestinian National Authority	Zhu Rongji	Yasser Arafat	November 2002
November 2002	Gong Xiaoshen	宫小生	From November 2002 to July 2005 he was in charge of the Office at the Palestinian National Authority.	Zhu Rongji	Ahmed Qurei	November 2005
November 2005	Yang Weiguo	杨伟国	From November 2005 to November 2009 he was in charge of the Office at the Palestinian National Authority.	Wen Jiabao	Ahmed Qurei	November 2009
November 2009	Wang Qiang	王強		Wen Jiabao	Ismail Haniyeh	December 2012
December 2012	Liu Aizhong	劉愛忠		Wen Jiabao	Salam Fayyad	March 2015
April 2015	Chen Xingzhong	陈兴忠		Li Keqiang	Rami Hamdallah	March 2018
April 2018	Guo Wei	郭伟		Li Keqiang	Mohammad Shtayyeh	23 Feb 2023

== See also ==
- List of ambassadors of China to Palestine
- Ambassadors of China
