= Zhang Xun (disambiguation) =

Zhang Xun (張勳, 1854-1923) was a Qing dynasty loyalist general who temporarily restored the abdicated emperor Puyi in 1917.

Zhang Xun or Chang Hsün may also refer to:

- Zhang Xun (Tang dynasty) (張巡), Tang dynasty general involved in the Battle of Suiyang against An Lushan
- Zhang Xun (diplomat), China's Ambassador to Syria from 2011, see List of ambassadors of China to Syria
