= Cambodia–China relations =

- Cambodia: China

Diplomatic mission
- Royal Embassy of Cambodia, Beijing: Embassy of China, Phnom Penh

Envoy
- Ambassador Soeung Rathchavy: Ambassador Wang Wenbin

The bilateral relations between the Kingdom of Cambodia and the People's Republic of China have been marked by close economic, political and security cooperation.

The first contacts between China and the Khmer Empire occurred in the Tang period in the 9th century after it was unified in 802 AD by Jayavarman II. Cambodia maintained relations with the Ming dynasty during the final years of the Khmer Empire when Ponhea Yat dispatched a minister to establish formal diplomatic ties. During the Cold War, the People's Republic of China supported the Khmer Rouge during the Cambodian Civil War against Lon Nol's regime. China also fostered good relations with Cambodian Prince Norodom Sihanouk, who also backed the Khmer Rouge. After Khmer Rouge victory, China provided extensive economic aid to the new government and emerged as Democratic Kampuchea's closest ally. When the Vietnamese military invaded Cambodia in 1978, China condemned Vietnam and waged a brief border war against Vietnam in 1979 to compel it to withdraw from Cambodia. China refused to recognize the People's Republic of Kampuchea established by Vietnam, recognizing the Coalition Government of Democratic Kampuchea government in exile instead.

Relations were normalized following the 1991 Paris Peace Agreements and the restoration of the Kingdom of Cambodia. Since 1997, China cultivated close ties with Cambodian Prime Minister Hun Sen and his government. Since then, China provided extensive economic, military and political support to Cambodia, while also providing the country with foreign aid. Cambodia has emerged as a close ally of China among ASEAN countries, and supporting China regarding territorial disputes in the South China Sea as well as China's internal politics. Cambodia adheres to the one China principle and considers Taiwan to be "an inalienable part" of China.

== History ==
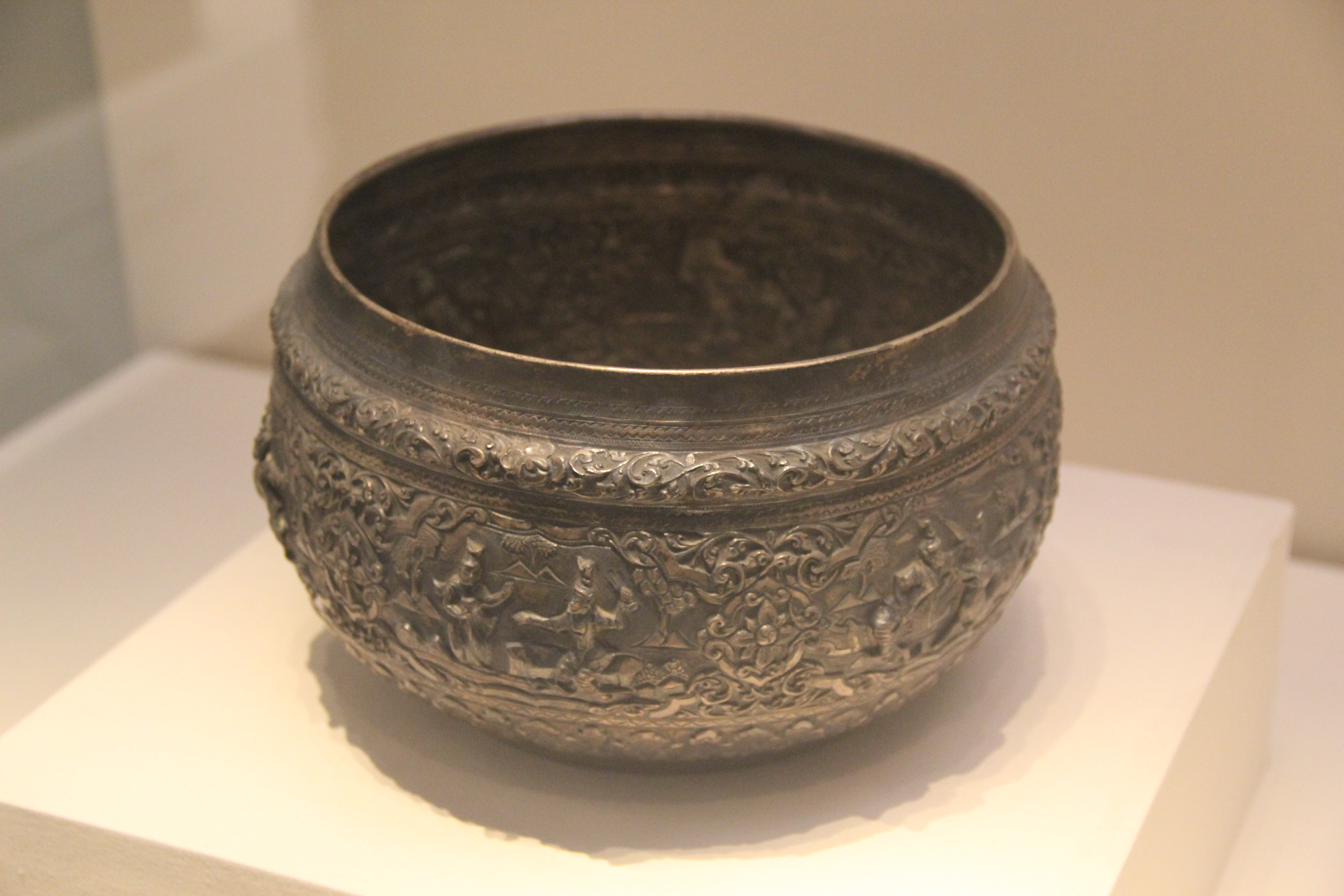
Present from Cambodia to Qing court

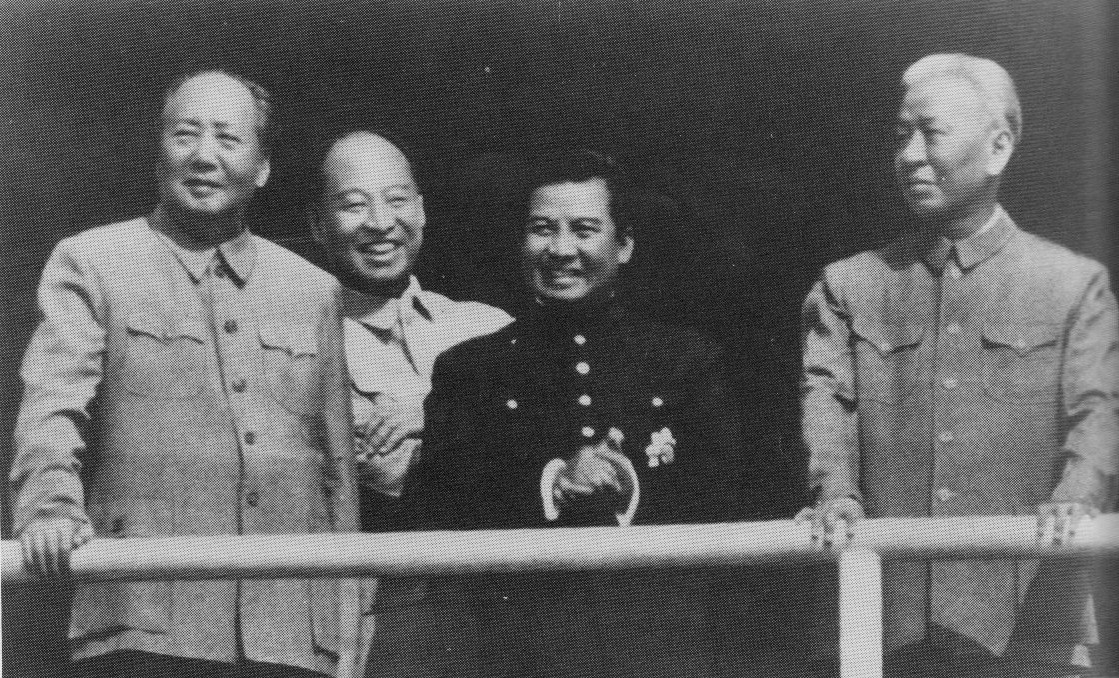
Then-Prince Norodom Sihanouk with CCP chairman Mao Zedong (far left) and Chinese president Liu Shaoqi (far right) in Beijing, 1965.

Although the countries share no common border, China has had a historic cultural and commercial relationship with Cambodia. The 950,000 Chinese in Cambodia constitute 3-5% of Cambodia's population, and although they were discriminated against by the Khmer Rouge and the Vietnamese, they have re-emerged as a prominent business community.

The first contacts between China and the Khmer Empire of Cambodia occurred in the Tang period, and for centuries onward the two countries shared a strong trading relationship. The region had long been "indianized" (influenced by Indian culture, religion, and administrative techniques) since the Funan period (1st–6th centuries AD). While Chinese annals (such as the New Book of Tang) often mention diplomatic missions and trade, there is no evidence of a distinct "Chinese Cambodian" community in the modern sense during the 8th century before the unification of the Khmer Empire by Jayavarman II in 802 AD. Instead, the elite were heavily influenced by Indian, Cham, and Javanese culture, adopting Hinduism (specifically Shivaism) and Sanskrit. A Chola-Song-Khmer trade axis dominated trade in the east for much of the 11th and 12th centuries. Yuan Chinese accounts of the Cambodian kingdom proved to be crucial to uncovering the history of the region. Cambodia maintained relations with Ming China as early as 1421 AD during the final years of the Khmer Empire when Ponhea Yat dispatched a minister to establish formal diplomatic ties.

China has used Cambodia as a counterweight to Vietnam. In the mid-20th century, the People's Republic of China supported the Maoist Khmer Rouge against Prime Minister Lon Nol's regime, who Nationalist China had ties with, during the Cambodian Civil War and then its takeover of Cambodia in 1975. Also, CCP Chairman Mao Zedong had fostered good relations with Prince Norodom Sihanouk, who also fought against Lon Nol and backed the Khmer Rouge. When the Vietnamese military invaded Cambodia in 1978, China provided extensive political and military support for the Khmer Rouge. In 1979, China waged a brief border war against Vietnam, partly to threaten it into pulling out of Cambodia. The Paris Peace Conference on Cambodia, from July 1989 to October 1991, resolved Cambodia–China relations.

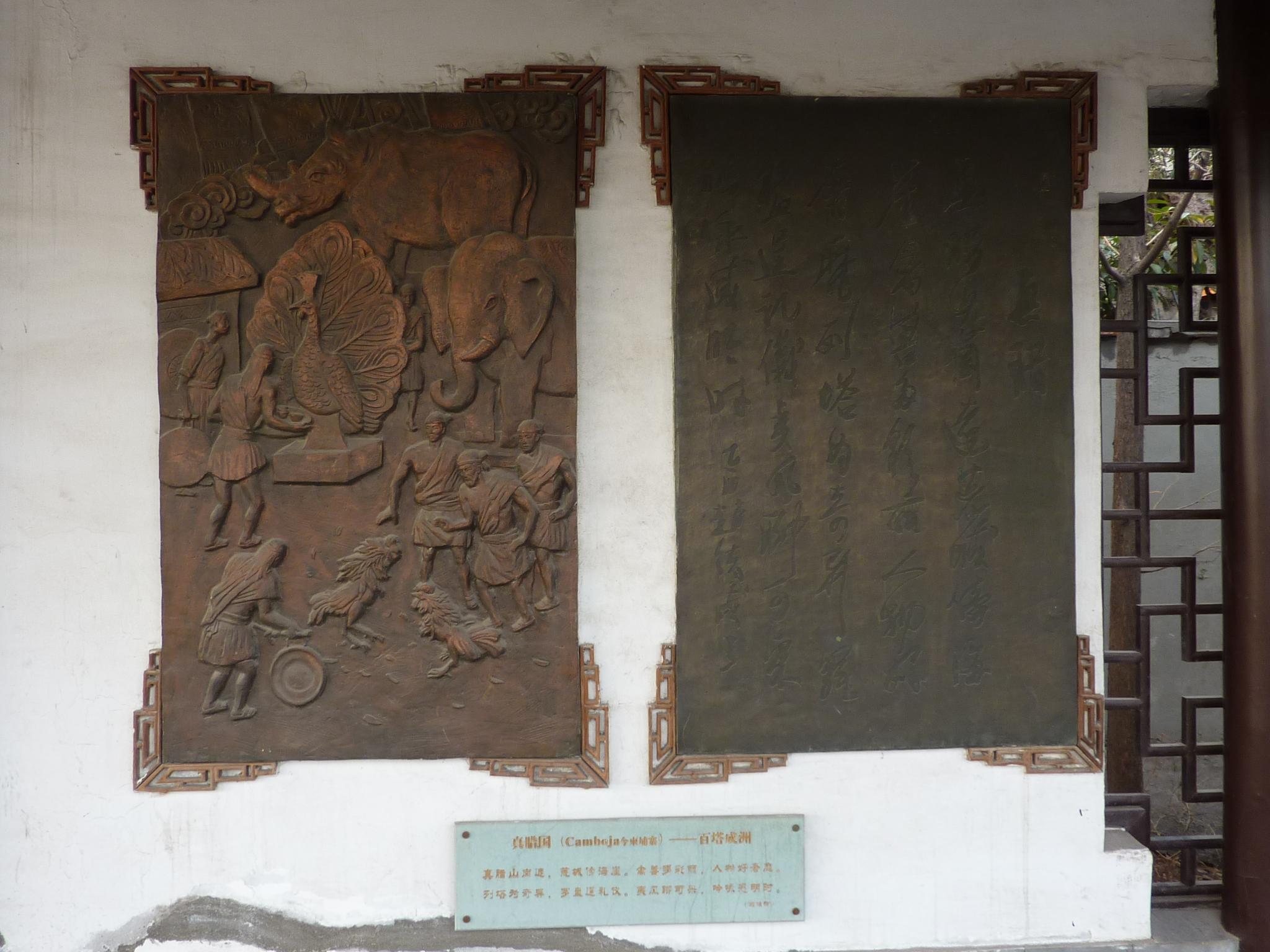
Modern depiction of a visit of Zheng He's fleet to Cambodia. A relief in Nanjing's Treasure Boat Shipyard Park

Since 1997, China began developing closer relations with the regime of Cambodian Prime Minister Hun Sen, once a pro-Vietnamese leader and a defector from the Khmer Rouge during Vietnam's occupation of Cambodia. Although initially backing Hun Sen's political opponent Prince Norodom Ranariddh and his FUNCINPEC, China was disenchanted with Ranariddh's efforts to build a closer relationship with Taiwan, which is claimed by China. Facing international isolation after the 1997 coup that brought him to power, Hun Sen cultivated close ties with China, which opposed efforts by Western countries to impose economic sanctions on Cambodia. China filled the gap in grants, aids, and investments formerly filled by Western countries. China's close ties with Cambodia have also served to gain leverage against Vietnamese influence in the region.

In 2000, General Secretary of the Chinese Communist Party Jiang Zemin became the first Chinese Head of State to visit Cambodia.

In July 2019, Cambodia was among 37 countries which signed a joint letter to the UNHRC defending China's treatment of Uyghurs and other Muslim minority groups in the Xinjiang region. In June 2020, Cambodia was one of 53 countries that backed the Hong Kong national security law at the United Nations.

In November 2022, Chinese Premier Li Keqiang visited Cambodia for the ASEAN Summit and stated that China would continue to support and provide aid for infrastructure projects and industrialization efforts in Cambodia.

In mid-April 2025, General Secretary of the Chinese Communist Party Xi Jinping visited Cambodia to reaffirm bilateral relations in response to United States President Donald Trump's Liberation Day tariffs. During the visit, Xi met with King Norodom Sihamoni, Prime Minister Hun Manet and Senate President Hun Sen.

== Cooperation ==
Generally, Since Cambodia gained its independence in 1953, there has been significant strategic collaboration between China and Cambodia. From the Cambodian perspective, strong relations with China help Cambodia to pushback against Cambodia's larger neighbors, Vietnam and Thailand.

During the visit of Chinese Premier Wen Jiabao between April 7-April 8, 2006 both nations signed several bilateral agreements and a treaty of "Comprehensive Partnership of Cooperation." China diversified its aid and investments in Cambodia and promised to provide US$600 million in loans and grants. China has canceled much of Cambodia's debt and granted a fresh loan of US$12.4 million for the construction of the building housing the Cambodian government's council of ministers and the restoration of the Angkor Wat temple and heritage site. About $200 million has been earmarked as a low-interest loan for the construction of bridges spanning the Mekong and Tonle Sap rivers. During the visit, Cambodian Prime Minister Hun Sen described China as Cambodia's "most trustworthy friend."

China has also funded Chinese language schools in Cambodia. Immigration of Chinese workers to Cambodia has also stepped up in recent years and is estimated between 50,000 and 300,000.

From 2000 to 2014, Cambodia received 132 projects financed by Chinese aid, a greater number of projects than any other recipient of Chinese aid. In 2014, Prime Minister Hun Sen requested that China help construct a stadium for Cambodia in advance of the 2023 Southeast Asian Games. China began building Morodok Techo National Stadium in 2017 at a cost of US$169 million and completed it for Cambodia in December 2021.

Within ASEAN, Cambodia is often supportive of China. In 2016, Cambodia took a China-favorable position at an ASEAN meeting which addressed sovereignty disputes in the South China Sea. Observers generally expected the meeting to produce a statement critical of China's positions, but through Cambodia's objection the meeting resulted in a more general statement not referencing China and speaking generally of concern over on-going developments in the South China Sea. Chinese leaders expressed their appreciation for Cambodia and China's foreign minister stated, "History will prove that the Cambodian side's maintained position is correct."

Cambodia follows the one China principle and considers Taiwan to be "an inalienable part" of China. Cambodia also supports all efforts by the PRC to "achieve national reunification" and opposes Taiwan independence. In 2025, Cambodia deported Taiwanese citizens involved in telecommunication fraud to China. In April 2026, China pledged to assist Cambodia in preventing color revolutions.

=== Defense ===
In the aftermath of the 1997 coup, China provided US$2.8 million in military aid and has since supplied wide range of military equipment, training of military and police cadre and naval vessels to combat drug trafficking and piracy. In May 2014, Cambodia and China entered into an agreement to increase their defense ties. As part of the agreement, China increased the number of scholarships it offered to Cambodian military personnel to study in China. In 2018, China provided $100 million to Cambodia for defense spending. In 2022, Cambodia and China signed a memorandum of understanding on defense cooperation.

Cambodia-China defense cooperation includes the Chinese-funded expansion of Ream Naval Base, which began in 2022 and was to be inaugurated on 2 April 2025. The project, which included a new pier and dry dock, raised concerns over China's military influence in the region, particularly from the U.S. and its allies. In 2019, reports suggested a secret agreement granting China access to the base, but Cambodia denied such claims. While Chinese warships docked there for months, Cambodia invited Japan's Maritime Self-Defense Force to use the facility, signaling openness to other nations. In September 2024, China pledged to provide Cambodia with two naval vessels.

=== Health ===
During the COVID-19 pandemic, China provided major assistance to the Hun Sen government's vaccination campaign. As of early November 2021, China had sent more than 35 million vaccines to Cambodia. China provided many of them free of charge. Vaccines provided by China accounted for more than 90% of total vaccines provided to Cambodia from other countries. China also provided other health care supplies as well as medical professionals to Cambodia during the pandemic. In part thanks to Chinese contributions, Cambodia had the second-highest vaccination rate in Southeast Asia, despite having the second lowest per capita GDP in the region.

== Commerce ==
Cambodia joined the Belt and Road Initiative (BRI) in 2013. Through the BRI, China has a major role in infrastructure development in Cambodia. In 2017, China financed approximately 70% of Cambodia's road and bridge development. China built a major expressway between Sihanoukville and Phnom Penh, which began operating in 2023.

There are multiple large-scale Chinese investment projects in Cambodia such as the 400 MW Lower Se San 2 Dam worth $781 million and a US$3.8 billion deep-water port project on a 90-km stretch of Cambodian coastline. According to the Cambodian Center for Human Rights, the Cambodian government gave over 4.6 million hectares in concessions to 107 Chinese-owned firms between 1994 and 2012.

In 2010, Cambodia and China signed cooperation agreements on bridge and road infrastructure. Cambodia and China signed a free trade agreement in 2020.

Effective 1 December 2024, China eliminated tariffs for goods imported from all of the countries that the United Nations categorizes as least developed and with which China has diplomatic relations, including Cambodia.

== Concerns ==
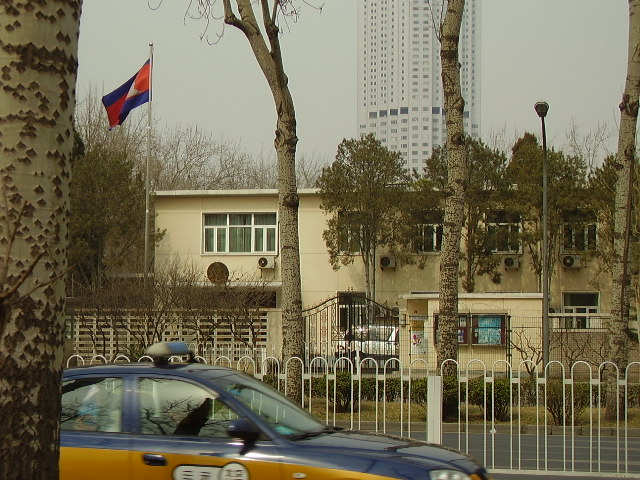
Embassy of Cambodia in China

The Cambodian government's suppression of the Falun Gong, a new religious movement (considered by China and other critics to be a cult) banned by China, and extradition of two Falun Gong activists to China was criticized by human rights activities and the United Nations High Commissioner for Refugees. Suspected preferential treatment for Cambodia-based Chinese firms and the National Assembly's guarantee of profits for the Chinese investors in the Kamchay power plant has also provoked criticism from opposition politicians of China's growing political clout in Cambodia.

From 1994 to 2012 China invested a total of US$9.17 billion in Cambodia. However, illegal logging and shady deals involving members of Cambodia's government and Chinese firms were reported to be increasing. Mining projects and government land concessions to foreign and local firms, resulted in people being displaced from their land. According to The Cambodia Daily in 2006, Phong hill tribes in Mondulkiri province "claim that the Chinese company has colluded with the Cambodian government to illegally force them from their ancestral homeland". The Boeung Kak and Borei Keila evictions in Phnom Penh were seen by many observers as the Cambodian Government's increasing drift away from the adherence to human rights. The Chinese funded Sesan Dam project in the northeastern part of Cambodia, threaten to lower the fish stocks, and affect the livelihood of many Khmer. "By one estimate, the project will result in a 9 percent drop in fish stocks in the entire Mekong Basin".

== Public opinion ==
According to a 2026 feeling thermometer poll by the Carter Center and Emory University, Chinese opinion of Cambodia was on average 22 out of 100.
