= List of ambassadors of China to Chile =

The ambassador of China to Chile is the official representative of the People's Republic of China to Chile.

== List of representatives ==
Name (English)	Name (Chinese)	Tenure begins	Tenure ends	Note
Ding Hao	丁浩	January 1971	June 1971	
Lin Ping	林平	June 1971	February 1973	
Xu Zhongfu	徐中夫	March 1973	October 1977	
Zheng Weizhi	郑为之	October 1977	May 1978	
Hu Chengfang	胡成放	March 1978	December 1980	
Tang Haiguang	唐海光	April 1981	November 1985	
Huang Shikang	黄士康	March 1986	July 1990	
Zhu Xiangzhong	朱祥忠	September 1990	November 1995	
Wang Chengjia	王成家	December 1995	August 1998	
Zhang Shaying	张沙鹰	September 1998	October 2000	
Ren Jingyu	任景玉	December 2000	August 2003	
Li Changhua	李长华	September 2003	February 2007	
Liu Yuqin	刘玉琴	March 2007	December 2009	
Lü Fan	吕凡	January 2010	February 2012	
Yang Wanming	杨万明	May 2012	August 2014	
Li Baorong	李宝荣	September 2014	October 2017	
Xu Bu	徐步	January 2018	October 2020	
Niu Qingbao	牛清报	February 2021	March 2023	

== See also ==
- China–Chile relations
