= Bai Tian =

Chinese diplomat

- 白天

Ambassador of China to Malaysia
- In office 28 November 2017 – 27 November 2020
- President of China: Xi Jinping
- Premier of China: Li Keqiang
- Yang di-Pertuan Agong of Malaysia: Muhammad V (2017–2019); Abdullah (2019–2020)
- Prime Minister of Malaysia: Najib Razak (2017–2018); Mahathir Mohamad (2018–2020); Muhyiddin Yassin (2020)
- Preceded by: Huang Huikang
- Succeeded by: Ouyang Yujing

Bai Tian (Chinese: 白天; pinyin: Bái Tiān; born 27 September 1971) is a Chinese diplomat who is currently serving as Director-General of the Department of External Security Affairs of the Ministry of Foreign Affairs. Bai served as the Ambassador of China to Malaysia from November 2017 to November 2020.

== Early life and education ==
Bai Tian was born in Xi'an, Shaanxi province, on 27 September 1971. He was admitted to the English department of Xi'an International Studies University in 1989, and graduated in 1993.

== Political career ==
After receiving his degree, Bai joined the Ministry of Foreign Affairs of the People's Republic of China. His career began in the Department of Asian Affairs, and he was transferred to the Chinese Embassy in Nepal in 1995. In 1998, Bai was designated as an attaché to the General Office of the Ministry of Foreign Affairs, and he rose to the office's Second Secretary by 2005. He served concurrently as the Director of the Department of Asian Affairs until 2007, when he was promoted once again to First Secretary and Counselor to the General Office of the MFA. From 2009 to 2013, he served as Counselor to the Chinese Embassy in the Philippines. Bai served as Counselor to the Department of Asian Affairs of the MFA from 2013 to 2014 and was promoted to the position of Deputy Director-General of the Department from 2014-2017. In November 2017, Bai was appointed as Ambassador of China to Malaysia, where he served until his resignation on 27 November 2020. Following his resignation, Bai was appointed Director-General of the Department of External Security Affairs of the MFA. In 2022, Bai was the rotating chairman of the BRICS Counter-Terrorism Working Group.
