= Nong Rong =

Chinese politician

- 农融

Chinese Ambassador to Pakistan
- In office September 2020 – February 2023
- Preceded by: Yao Jing
- Succeeded by: Jiang Zaidong

Assistant Minister of Foreign Affairs
- In office February 2023 – 23 February 2024
- Minister: Qin Gang
- Preceded by: Wu Jianghao

Personal details
- Born: September 1967 (age 59) Mashan County, Guangxi, China
- Party: Chinese Communist Party
- Education: Peking University

Chinese name
- Traditional Chinese: 農融
- Simplified Chinese: 农融
Transcriptions
Standard Mandarin
- Hanyu Pinyin: Nóng Róng

Nong Rong (Chinese: 农融; born September 1967) is a Chinese politician and diplomat of Zhuang ethnicity, now serving as the Vice Director of Hong Kong And Macao Affairs Office, previously he was serving as Assistant Minister of Foreign Affairs, Chinese Ambassador to Pakistan.

He was a delegate to the 13th National People's Congress.

== Biography ==
Nong was born in Mashan County, Guangxi, in September 1967.

He joined the Chinese Communist Party in January 1987, and began his political career in July 1991. After graduating from Peking University in 1991, he was assigned to the Guangxi Foreign Economic and Trade Commission, becoming director of the Cooperation Division in April 2002 and dean and director in January 2003. After working in the Department of Commerce of Guangxi Autonomous Region for a year, he was transferred to the Guangxi International Expo Affairs Bureau. In April 2013, he was vice-mayor and deputy party chief of Fangchenggang, he remained in that position until December 2015, when he was transferred to Guigang and appointed vice-mayor and deputy party chief. In December 2019 he was promoted to become director of the Ethnic and Religious Affairs Committee of Guangxi Autonomous Region, a position he held until September 2020, when he was appointed the Chinese Ambassador to Pakistan, replacing Yao Jing. In 2021 during a visit to the Pakistani city of Quetta, located in the province of Balochistan near the Afghan border, the Ambassador's hotel was subject to a car bomb attack. The Pakistani Taliban claimed responsibility for the attack.

In February 2023, he was appointed Assistant Minister of Foreign Affairs by the State Council.

Government offices
Preceded by Li Xinyuan	Mayor of Guigang; 2015–2019	Succeeded by He Luchun
Preceded by He Chaojian	Director of the Ethnic and Religious Affairs Commission of Guangxi; 2020	Succeeded by Ban Zhongbai
Diplomatic posts
Preceded by Yao Jing	Chinese Ambassador to Pakistan; 2020–2023	Succeeded by Jiang Zaidong
