= Wang Wentian =

Chinese diplomat

- 王文天

Chinese Ambassador to Cambodia
- In office November 2018 – 5 July 2024
- Appointed by: Xi Jinping
- Preceded by: Xiong Bo
- Succeeded by: Wang Wenbin

Chinese Ambassador to Laos
- In office July 2017 – October 2018
- Appointed by: Xi Jinping
- Preceded by: Guan Huabing
- Succeeded by: Jiang Zaidong

Personal details
- Born: August 1963 (age 62) China
- Party: Chinese Communist Party
- Spouse: Gu Xiaojun
- Children: 2

Wang Wentian (Chinese: 王文天; pinyin: Wáng Wéntiān; born August 1963) is a Chinese diplomat who served as Chinese Ambassador to Cambodia from November 2018 to July 2024.

== Biography ==
Born in August 1963, Wang joined the foreign service in 1991 and has served primarily in the Department of Asian Affairs and South Asia. He was counsellor in Brunei from 2008 to 2010, counsellor in Switzerland from 2010 to 2013, and counsellor in Canada from 2014 to 2017. In July 2017, he had been appointed as Chinese Ambassador to Laos, taking over from Guan Huabing. He was designated by the Standing Committee of the National People's Congress in November 2018 to replace Xiong Bo as Chinese Ambassador to Cambodia. On 5 July 2024, he was succeeded by Wang Wenbin.

== Personal life ==
Wang married Gu Xiaojun, the couple has a son and a daughter.

Diplomatic posts
Preceded by Guan Huabing	Chinese Ambassador to Laos; 2017–2018	Succeeded by Jiang Zaidong
Preceded by Xiong Bo	Chinese Ambassador to Cambodia; 2018–2024	Succeeded by Wang Wenbin
