= Xiong Bo =

Chinese politician and diplomat

- 熊波
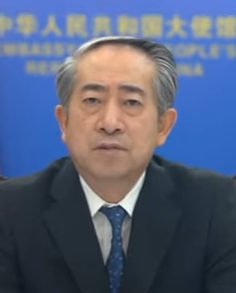
- Xiong in 2023

Chinese Ambassador to Vietnam
- In office November 2018 – August 2024
- Preceded by: Hong Xiaoyong
- Succeeded by: He Wei

Chinese Ambassador to Cambodia
- In office September 2016 – September 2018
- Preceded by: Bu Jianguo
- Succeeded by: Wang Wentian

Personal details
- Born: January 1964 (age 62) Guanyang, Guangxi, China
- Party: Chinese Communist Party

Xiong Bo (Chinese: 熊波; born January 1964) is a Chinese politician and diplomat who served as the Chinese Ambassador to Vietnam from November 2018 to August 2024. He previously served as the Chinese Ambassador to Cambodia, from 2016 to 2018.

== Biography ==
Xiong was born in 1964 in Guanyang County, Guangxi. In 1985, he entered the Ministry of Foreign Affairs of the People's Republic of China. From 1985 to 1998, he served in the department of Asian affairs within the ministry, Chinese Embassy in Japan and Chinese Consulate-General in Osaka, Japan.

In 1998, he was appointed as first secretary at the Chinese Embassy in Japan and from 2001 to 2005, he served as the deputy director and first secretary of the department of Asian affairs. In 2005, he was appointed as counsellor at the Chinese Embassy in Japan, a position he served till 2007. From 2007 to 2011, he served as counselor and director of the Asian department within the foreign ministry. From 2011 to 2014, he served as the deputy director-general of the Asian department.

In January 2015, he was appointed as member of the Standing Committee and Deputy Mayor of Municipal Committee of the city of Rizhao. In 2016, he was appointed as the Chinese Ambassador to the Kingdom of Cambodia. On 24 September 2016, he presented his credentials to King of Cambodia Norodom Sihamoni. On 23 July 2018, during speech at the Royal University of Phnom Penh, Xiong said that the European Union should not exploit Cambodia's political situation to put commercial and economic pressure on it.

In November 2018, he was appointed as Chinese Ambassador to the Socialist Republic of Vietnam. On 18 November 2018, he presented his credentials to President of Vietnam and General Secretary of the Communist Party of Vietnam Nguyễn Phú Trọng. In April 2020, Báo Thế giới và Việt Nam, the newspaper of the Ministry of Foreign Affairs of Vietnam published an article by Xiong where he highlighted China's bankrolling of projects along the Mekong River. According to a report by the Center for Naval Analyses, Xiong's article seemed push back against criticism that Chinese projects on Mekong have had a severely negative effect on downriver communities of countries where the river flows through. On 11 December 2023, ahead of the visit of General Secretary of the Chinese Communist Party Xi Jinping to Vietnam on 12 December 2023, Xiong announced that China is prepared to provide financial assistance to Vietnam for the enhancement of a railway connection between Guangxi and Hanoi, and that there are additional commitments to accelerate the implementation of initiatives aimed at establishing further railway networks that connect the two nations. He was succeeded by He Wei in August 2024.

== Awards and honors ==
- Grand Cross of the Royal Order of Sahametrei (Cambodia, 29 August 2018)
- Friendship Order (Vietnam, 27 August 2024)

Diplomatic posts
Preceded by Hong Xiaoyong	Chinese Ambassador to Vietnam; 2018–2024	Succeeded by He Wei
Preceded by Bu Jianguo (布建国)	Chinese Ambassador to Cambodia; 2016-2018	Succeeded by Wang Wentian
