= Qin Jialin =

Chinese diplomat (1919–2002)

Qin Jialin (Chinese: 秦加林) (March 25, 1919 – September 3, 2002) was a Chinese diplomat. He was born in Yinzhou District, Ningbo, Zhejiang. He joined the Chinese Communist Party in 1937 and the New Fourth Army in 1938. He worked at Xinhua Daily. He was Ambassador of the People's Republic of China to Syria (1969–1974), Denmark (1977–1982) and Morocco (1982–1983).

Preceded by Chen Tan	Ambassador of China to Syria; 1969–1974	Succeeded by Cao Keqiang
Preceded by Yue Liang	Ambassador of China to Denmark; 1977–1982	Succeeded by Ding Xuesong
Preceded by Mi Yong	Chinese Ambassador to Morocco; 1982–1983	Succeeded by Wei Dong
