= Lin Zhaonan =

Chinese diplomat

Lin Zhaonan (Chinese: 林兆南) was a Chinese diplomat serving as Chinese Ambassador to Syria from October 1983 to March 1986.

Preceded by Lu Weizhao	Ambassador of China to Syria; 1983–1986	Succeeded by Wang Changyi
