= Lü Fan (diplomat) =

Chinese diplomat

- 吕凡
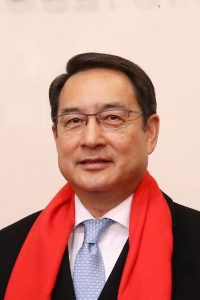
- Lü in 2019

Chinese Ambassador to Spain
- In office December 2014 – November 2019
- Preceded by: Zhu Bangzao
- Succeeded by: Wu Haitao

Chinese Ambassador to Andorra
- In office December 2014 – November 2019
- Preceded by: Zhu Bangzao
- Succeeded by: Wu Haitao

Chinese Ambassador to Chile
- In office December 2009 – February 2012
- Preceded by: Liu Yuqin
- Succeeded by: Yang Wanming (diplomat)

Personal details
- Born: November 1956 (age 69) Heilongjiang, China
- Party: Chinese Communist Party
- Children: 1

Chinese name
- Simplified Chinese: 吕凡
- Traditional Chinese: 呂凡
Transcriptions
Standard Mandarin
- Hanyu Pinyin: Lǚ Fán

Lü Fan (Chinese: 吕凡; born November 1956) is a Chinese diplomat who served as Chinese Ambassador to Chile from 2009 to 2012, and Chinese Ambassador to Andorra and Spain from 2014 to 2019.

== Biography ==
Lü was born in Heilongjiang, in November 1956. He joined the foreign service in 1979 and has served primarily in Spain. In December 2009, he was appointed to replace Liu Yuqin as Chinese Ambassador to Chile. In December 2014, President Xi Jinping named him Ambassador to Chinese Ambassador to Andorra and Spain, and he held the posts from 2014 until 2019.

== Personal life ==
Lü is married and has a son.

Diplomatic posts
Preceded by Liu Yuqin	Chinese Ambassador to Chile; 2009–2012	Succeeded by Yang Wanming
Preceded by Zhu Bangzao	Chinese Ambassador to Andorra and Spain; 2014–2019	Succeeded by Wu Haitao
