= Cao Keqiang =

Chinese diplomat (1921–1999)

Cao Keqiang (Chinese: 曹克强) (October 1921 – 1999) was a Chinese diplomat.

== Life and career ==
Cao was Ambassador of the People's Republic of China to Syria (1968–1974), Dominion of Ceylon now Sri Lanka (1969–1970), Sweden (1979–1982), Djibouti (1982–1983) and France (1983–1986). Cao died in 1999.

== Footnotes ==
Preceded by Qin Jialin	Ambassador of China to Syria; 1968–1974	Succeeded by Lu Weizhao
Preceded by Yao Guang	Ambassador of China to Ceylon; 1969–1970	Succeeded by
Preceded by Qin Lizhen	Ambassador of China to Sweden; 1979–1982	Succeeded by Wang Ze
Preceded by Yao Guang	Ambassador of China to Djibouti; 1982–1983	Succeeded by Wang Changyi
Preceded by Yao Guang	Ambassador of China to France; 1983–1986	Succeeded by
