= List of ambassadors of China to Malaysia =

Head of Chinese diplomatic mission to Malaysia

Coordinates: 3.159536°N 101.727977°E

Ambassador of China to Malaysia
- Incumbent; Ouyang Yujing since 20 December 2020
- Inaugural holder: Wang Youping
- Formation: January 1975; 51 years ago
- Website: my.china-embassy.org/eng/

The ambassador of China to Malaysia is the official representative of the People's Republic of China to Malaysia.

== History ==
- In 1963, Malaysia was founded.
- In 1964, the Republic of China (ROC) set up a consulate in Kuala Lumpur.
- In 1969, the consulate was upgraded to a Consulate General.
- On 31 May 1974, the People's Republic of China and Malaysia took up diplomatic relations.

== List of officeholders ==
=== Ambassadors of China to Malaysia ===
Diplomatic agrément/Diplomatic accreditation	Ambassador	Chinese language zh:中国驻马来西亚大使列表	Observations	Premier of China	Prime Minister of Malaysia	Term end
January 1975	Wang Youping	zh:王幼平		Zhou Enlai	Abdul Razak Hussein Hussein Onn	April 1977
December 1977	Ye Chengzhang	zh:叶成章	* From July 1973 to October 1977 he was ambassador in Yangon (Myanmar).	Hua Guofeng	Hussein Onn Mahathir Mohamad	October 1982
March 1983	Chen Kang	zh:陈抗		Zhao Ziyang	Mahathir Mohamad	January 1985
March 1985	Hu Gang	zh:胡岗		Zhao Ziyang	Mahathir Mohamad	April 1988
July 1988	Zhou Gang	zh:周刚	From January 1988 to May 1991 he was ambassador to Kuala Lumpur (Malaysia).; From May 1991 to March 1995 he was ambassador to Islamabad (Pakistan).; From December 1994 to February 1998 he was ambassador to Jakarta (Indonesia).; From July 1997 to August 2001he was ambassador to New Delhi (India).	Li Peng	Mahathir Mohamad	April 1991
August 1991	Jin Guihua	zh:金桂华	Kim Quế Hoa (* January 14, 1935): starting in July 1992 he was concurrently accredited as ambassador in Brunei.; From January 1994 to July 1997 he was ambassador in Bangkok (Thailand).	Li Peng	Mahathir Mohamad	November 1993
January 1994	Qian Jinchang	zh:钱锦昌		Li Peng	Mahathir Mohamad	January 1999
February 1999	Guan Dengming	zh:关登明	From April 1995 to February 1999 he was ambassador in Manila (Philippines).	Zhu Rongji	Mahathir Mohamad	August 2001
September 2001	Hu Zhengyue	zh:胡正跃		Zhu Rongji	Mahathir Mohamad Abdullah Ahmad Badawi	February 2004
April 2004	Wang Chungui	zh:王春贵	(* 1946 ): From February 1997 to June 2000 he was ambassador in Dhaka (Bangladesh).; From September 2000 to March 2004 he was ambassador in Manila Philippines.; From April 2004 to June 2008 he was ambassador in Kula Lumpur (Malaysia).	Wen Jiabao	Abdullah Ahmad Badawi	August 2006
August 2006	Cheng Yonghua	zh:程永华		Wen Jiabao	Abdullah Ahmad Badawi	August 2008
September 2008	Liu Jian	zh:劉健	刘 健	Wen Jiabao	Abdullah Ahmad Badawi Najib Razak	June 2010
July 2010	Chai Xi	zh:柴玺	From October 2003 to March 2007 he was ambassador in Dhaka (Bangladesh).; From April 2007 to July 2009 he was ambassador to Valeta (Malta).; From July 2010 to January 2014 he was ambassador in Kuala Lumpur (Malaysia).	Wen Jiabao	Najib Razak	December 2013
January 2014	Huang Huikang	zh:黄惠康		Li Keqiang	Najib Razak	October 2017
November 2017	Bai Tian	zh:白天		Li Keqiang	Najib Razak Mahathir Mohamad Muhyiddin Yassin	November 2020
December 2020	Ouyang Yujing	zh:欧阳玉靖		Li Keqiang Li Qiang	Muhyiddin Yassin Ismail Sabri Yaakob Anwar Ibrahim	Incumbent

== See also ==
- China–Malaysia relations
