= Guan Huabing =

Chinese diplomat (born 1956)

- 关华兵

Chinese Ambassador to Laos
- In office June 2013 – January 2017
- Appointed by: Xi Jinping
- Preceded by: Bu Jianguo
- Succeeded by: Wang Wentian

Personal details
- Born: November 1956 (age 69) Anhui, China
- Party: Chinese Communist Party

Chinese name
- Simplified Chinese: 关华兵
- Traditional Chinese: 關華兵
Transcriptions
Standard Mandarin
- Hanyu Pinyin: Guān Huábīng

Guan Huabing (Chinese: 关华兵; born November 1956) is a Chinese diplomat who served as Chinese Ambassador to Laos from 2013 to 2017.

== Biography ==
Born in Anhui in November 1956, Guan joined the foreign service in 1988 and has served primarily in North Korea and South Korea. In June 2013, he succeeded Bu Jianguo as Chinese Ambassador to Laos according the National People's Congress decision, serving in that position from 2013 to 2017.

== Honours and awards ==
- January 2017 Friendship Medal

Diplomatic posts
Preceded by Bu Jianguo	Chinese Ambassador to Laos; 2013–2017	Succeeded by Wang Wentian
