= Wang Wenbin =

Chinese diplomat (born 1971)

- 汪文斌
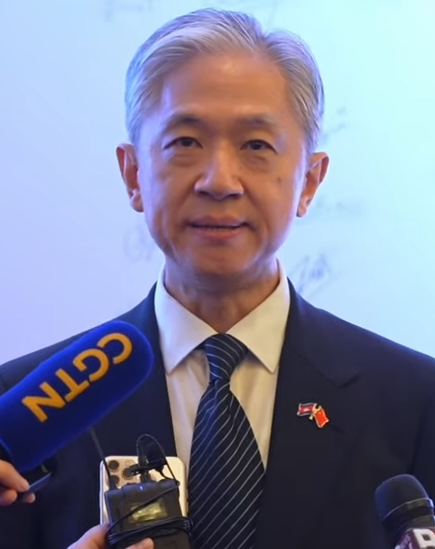
- Wang Wenbin interviewed while as Chinese Ambassador to Cambodia, 2024

Chinese Ambassador to Cambodia
- Incumbent
- Assumed office 5 July 2024
- Preceded by: Wang Wentian

Deputy Director of the Information Department of the Ministry of Foreign Affairs
- In office July 2020 – 7 June 2024 Serving with Mao Ning, Hu Jian, Lin Jian, Jiang Xiaoyan
- Director: Hua Chunying
- Preceded by: Geng Shuang

Chinese Ambassador to Tunisia
- In office May 2018 – June 2020
- Preceded by: Bian Yanhua
- Succeeded by: Zhang Jianguo

Personal details
- Born: April 1971 (age 55) Tongcheng, Anhui, China
- Party: Chinese Communist Party
- Children: 1
- Education: China Foreign Affairs University (BA)

Wang Wenbin (Chinese: 汪文斌; pinyin: Wāng Wénbīn; born April 1971) is a Chinese diplomat who has served as Ambassador of China to Cambodia since July 2024.

Wang was formerly a spokesman for the Ministry of Foreign Affairs (MFA) and deputy director of the MFA Information Department from July 2020 to June 2024. He is the 32nd spokesperson since the position was established in the ministry back in 1983. He served as the Chinese Ambassador to Tunisia from 2018 to 2020, and has worked in Chinese embassies in Mauritius and Senegal.

Wang is known as a wolf warrior diplomat for his defense of the Chinese government and his opposition to criticism of it. As a spokesman of the Chinese foreign ministry, he rejected the United States' claim that the Taiwan Strait is international waters and was known for his controversial statements on the South China Sea dispute.

== Biography ==
Wang was born in Anhui, China in April 1971. He attended Nanjing Jinling High School. In 1989 he entered China Foreign Affairs University, where he majored in French. After graduation, he was assigned to the Ministry of Foreign Affairs. He served in various diplomatic positions including deputy director and director of the Policy Research Office, political counsellor of the Chinese Embassy in the Republic of Mauritius, counsellor of the Department of Policy Planning, and deputy director of the Department of Policy Planning. He was designated by 13th Standing Committee of the National People's Congress in May 2018 to replace Bian Yanhua as Ambassador to Tunisia. On 17 July 2020, he was appointed the spokesperson of the Foreign Ministry, succeeding Geng Shuang.

On 24 May 2024, on his press briefing at the foreign ministry, he ended the session with his "farewell" to the position. On 5 July 2024, Wang was appointed as Ambassador of China to Cambodia.

== Comments for MFA ==
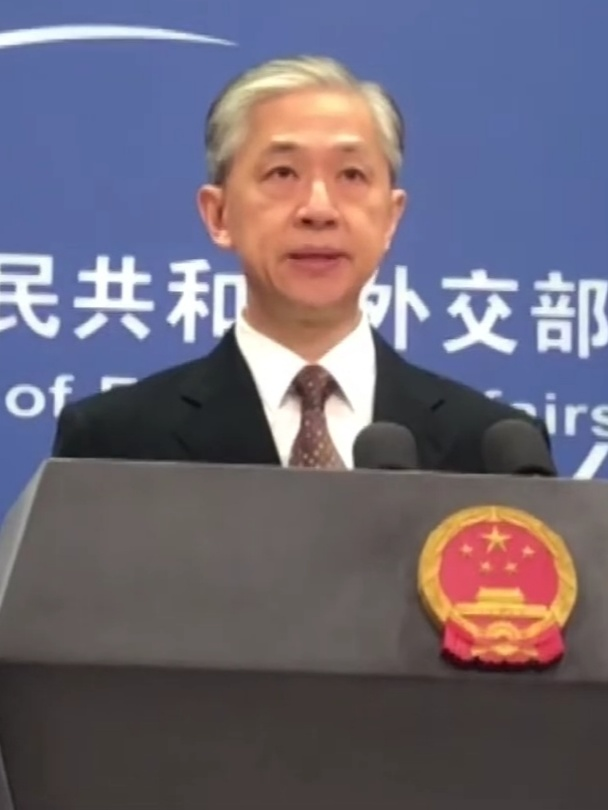
Wang as a foreign ministry spokesperson, 2020

In February 2021, Wang called Uyghur genocide the "lie of the century". In September 2022, he described the UN report about the genocide as "completely illegal", stating that it is a "patchwork of disinformation" by the U.S. and Western forces to "contain China".

After a resolution about disqualifying lawmakers who support Hong Kong independence was passed, in November 2020, four lawmakers were dismissed. Wang stated their disqualification is "rational, reasonable and in line with the constitution and laws". In December 2022, he said that Beijing supported the "resolute defence of the national anthem’s dignity," in reference to Glory to Hong Kong being highly ranked on Google when searching for the national anthem of Hong Kong.

In February 2023, in response to the 2023 Chinese balloon incident, Wang said that "Since last year alone, US balloons have illegally flown above China more than 10 times without any approval from Chinese authorities."

Following a 2024 statement by US Secretary of State Antony Blinken during the Gaza War which equated the suffering of Muslims in Xinjiang with the suffering of Muslims in Gaza, Wang on behalf of the MFA stated, "There is no conflict in Xinjiang, but the conflict is in the Gaza Strip. Muslims in Xinjiang are not suffering from hunger, expulsion, and killing, but the millions of Muslims in the Gaza Strip are suffering from hunger, expulsion, and killing. The US should stop playing double standards on human rights, stop political performances on humanitarian issues in Gaza, and stop exclusively obstructing the UN Security Council's efforts to promote a ceasefire and end the war in Gaza. What the US should do is not to issue hypocritical and empty Ramadan statements, but to take concrete actions to save the lives of Muslims in Gaza."

=== South China Sea dispute ===
In March 2024, Wang Wenbin told Seoul's government to not interfere with the South China Sea dispute after South Korea's concerns over the collision of Chinese and Filipino coastguard vessels on Second Thomas Shoal. On the same month, the Philippines expelled Chinese diplomats over an alleged leaked telephone call with a Filipino admiral about the South China Sea. As a response, Wang later made an official statement calling these actions "provocations" on the dispute.

On 1 April 2024, he stated that the Philippines' policies on the South China Sea will not affect their maritime rights and China's sovereignty. This statement was made after Philippine president Bongbong Marcos ordered his government to strengthen the country's maritime security.

== Personal life ==
Wang is married and has a daughter.

Due to his personality as a diplomat, he gained a huge following on Chinese social media and several forums referred to him as "Uncle Wang". His assertive style resulted in popularity among some Chinese internet users who characterise Wang among as one of the "Super Band of Chinese Diplomats".

Diplomatic posts
| Preceded by Bian Yanhua (边燕花) | Chinese Ambassador to Tunisia; 2018–2020 | Succeeded by Zhang Jianguo (张建国) |
| Preceded by Wang Wentian | Chinese Ambassador to Cambodia; 2024–present | Incumbent |
