= Chen Tan =

Chinese diplomat

Chen Tan (Chinese: 陈坦) was a Chinese diplomat. He was Ambassador of the People's Republic of China to Syria (1966–1967) and Equatorial Guinea (1971–1974).

Preceded by Xu Yixin	Ambassador of China to Syria; 1966–1967	Succeeded by Qin Jialin
Preceded by New office	Chinese Ambassador to Equatorial Guinea; 1971–1974	Succeeded by Hu Jingrui
