= List of ambassadors of China to Equatorial Guinea =

Coordinates: 3.753178°N 8.771349°E

Ambassador of China to Equatorial Guinea
- Inaugural holder: Chen Tan
- Formation: February 1971; 55 years ago

The ambassador of China to Equatorial Guinea is the official representative of the People's Republic of China to the Republic of Equatorial Guinea.

== List of representatives ==
Designated/accredited	Ambassador	Chinese language zh:中国驻赤道几内亚大使列表	Observations	Premier of the People's Republic of China	List of presidents of Equatorial Guinea	Term end
February 1971	Chen Tan	zh:陈坦		Zhou Enlai	Francisco Macías Nguema	May 1974
August 1974	Hu Jingrui	zh:胡景瑞	* From January 1984 to May 1987 he was ambassador to Guinea-Bissau.	Zhou Enlai	Francisco Macías Nguema	October 1979
February 1980	Lin Song	zh:林松 (外交官)		Zhao Ziyang	Teodoro Obiang Nguema Mbasogo	October 1983
July 1984	Liu Fangpu	zh:刘芳圃		Zhao Ziyang	Teodoro Obiang Nguema Mbasogo	December 1986
March 1987	Dai Shiqi	zh:戴诗琪		Li Peng	Teodoro Obiang Nguema Mbasogo	July 1990
March 1990	Wang Yongcheng	zh:王永成 (中國)		Li Peng	Teodoro Obiang Nguema Mbasogo	November 1993
March 1994	Xu Shaohai	zh:徐绍海		Li Peng	Teodoro Obiang Nguema Mbasogo	June 1997
August 1997	Chen Huailong	zh:陈怀龙		Li Peng	Teodoro Obiang Nguema Mbasogo	November 2000
December 2000	Xu Changcai	zh:许昌财		Zhu Rongji	Teodoro Obiang Nguema Mbasogo	August 2003
August 2003	Wang Xiaoyuan	zh:汪晓源	(*December 1954): From March 2006 to November 2007, he was an ambassador in Montevideo (Uruguay).; From August 2007 to February 2010 he was an ambassador in San José, Costa Rica.; From September 2011 to December 2015 he was ambassador in Bogotá (Colombia)	Wen Jiabao	Teodoro Obiang Nguema Mbasogo	January 2006
February 2006	Li Zhongliang	zh:李仲良	*From November 2007 to October 2010 he was an ambassador in Montevideo (Uruguay).	Wen Jiabao	Teodoro Obiang Nguema Mbasogo	November 2007
December 2007	Yan Xiaomin	zh:严小敏		Wen Jiabao	Teodoro Obiang Nguema Mbasogo	July 2010
July 2010	Wang Shixiong	zh:王士雄 (外交官)	* Since April 2013 he in ambassador in Quito (Ecuador).	Wen Jiabao	Teodoro Obiang Nguema Mbasogo	April 2013
April 2013	Zhao Hongsheng	赵宏声		Li Keqiang	Teodoro Obiang Nguema Mbasogo	March 2023
