= List of ambassadors of China to Switzerland =

Coordinates: 46°56′22″N 07°27′55″E

Ambassador of China to Switzerland
- Incumbent; Geng Wenbing since February 2016
- Inaugural holder: Wang Rongbao
- Formation: 1 March 1919; 107 years ago

The ambassador of China to Switzerland is the official representative of the People's Republic of China to the Swiss Confederation.

== List of representatives ==
Diplomatic agrément/Diplomatic accreditation	Photo	Ambassador	Chinese language zh:中国驻瑞士大使列表	Observations	Diplomatic Documents of Switzerland	Premier of the People's Republic of China	List of presidents of the Swiss Confederation	Term end
January 1919				The Governments in Beijing and Bern established diplomatic relations.		Gong Xinzhan	Gustave Ador	
March 1, 1919		Wang Rongbao	zh:汪荣宝	(1878 - June 1933 in Beijing)		Gong Xinzhan	Gustave Ador	June 15, 1922
June 15, 1922		Lu Zhengxiang	zh:陆征祥			Wang Chonghui	Robert Haab	May 1, 1927
August 27, 1931		Wu Kai-shen	吴凯声	Wu Kai-shen, Chinese Chinese ministers to the Court of St. James and delegated Switzerland,,, Woo Kai-sheng (Wu Kal-iheng) WOO KAI-SHENG, legal practitioner,, born at Ishing, Kiangsu, 1900		Chiang Kai-shek	Heinrich Häberlin	April 6, 1932
May 24, 1933		Victor Hoo Chi-tsai	zh:胡世泽	(*November 1894 - 9. Juni 1972)		Wang Jingwei	Edmund Schulthess	October 3, 1941
June 9, 1945		Lone Liang	zh:梁龙 (外交官)	(*September 23, 1898 - May 12, 1975): From 1928 to 1934 he was charge d Affairs in Berlin.		Chiang Kai-shek	Eduard von Steiger	December 24, 1949
December 18, 1946		Wu Nan-ju	zh:吴南如		Wu Nan-ju in the Dodis database of the Diplomatic Documents of Switzerland	Chiang Kai-shek	Karl Kobelt	January 1, 1950
September 18, 1950		Feng Hsuan	zh:冯铉		Feng Hsuan in the Dodis database of the Diplomatic Documents of Switzerland	Zhou Enlai	Max Petitpierre	February 1956
September 14, 1950				The Governments in Beijing and Bern established diplomatic relations.		Zhou Enlai	Max Petitpierre	
June 1956		Feng Xuan	zh:冯铉		Feng Xuan in the Dodis database of the Diplomatic Documents of Switzerland	Zhou Enlai	Markus Feldmann	April 1959
April 1959		Li Qingquan	李清泉		Li Qingquan in the Dodis database of the Diplomatic Documents of Switzerland	Zhou Enlai	Paul Chaudet	December 1965
August 1966		Zheng Weizhi	zh:郑为之		Zheng Weizhi in the Dodis database of the Diplomatic Documents of Switzerland	Zhou Enlai	Hans Schaffner	October 1969
December 1970		Chen Zhifang	zh:陈志方		Chen Zhifang in the Dodis database of the Diplomatic Documents of Switzerland	Zhou Enlai	Hans-Peter Tschudi	August 1975
August 1976		Li Yunchuan	zh:李云川		Li Yunchuan in the Dodis database of the Diplomatic Documents of Switzerland	Hua Guofeng	Rudolf Gnägi	July 1982
February 1984		Tian Jin (PRC diplomat)	zh:田进			Zhao Ziyang	Leon Schlumpf	May 1987
August 1987		Cai Fangbai	zh:蔡方柏			Li Peng	Pierre Aubert	August 1990
October 1990		Ding Yuanhong	zh:丁原洪			Li Peng	Arnold Koller	August 1992
October 1992		Xin Futan	zh:辛福坦			Li Peng	René Felber	January 1996
March 1996		Zhou Zizhong	zh:周子忠			Li Peng	Jean-Pascal Delamuraz	July 2000
July 2000		Wu Chuanfu	zh:吴传福			Zhu Rongji	Adolf Ogi	January 2004
March 2004		Zhu Bangzao	zh:朱邦造	Born in 1952 in Jiangsu Province.; From 1977 to 1979 he studied in Switzerland.; From *1985 to 1986 he studied in France.; From 1998 to 2001 he was foreign ministry spokesperson.		Wen Jiabao	Joseph Deiss	March 2008
April 2008		Dong Jinyi	zh:董津义			Wen Jiabao	Pascal Couchepin	August 2010
September 2010		Wu Ken	zh:吴恳			Wen Jiabao	Doris Leuthard	February 2013
April 2013		Xu Jinghu	zh:许镜湖			Li Keqiang	Ueli Maurer	February 2016
February 2016		Geng Wenbing	zh:耿文兵			Li Keqiang	Didier Burkhalter	July 2020
August 2020		Wang Shihting	zh:王世廷			Li Keqiang	Ignazio Cassis	

Representation of China in Switzerland in the Dodis database of the Diplomatic Documents of Switzerland

== See also ==
- China–Switzerland relations
