= List of ambassadors of China to Spain =

The Chinese ambassador to Spain is the official representative of the People's Republic of China to Spain.

== List of representatives ==
| Name (English) | Name (Chinese) | Tenure begins | Tenure ends | Note |
|---|---|---|---|---|
| Chen Zhaoyuan | 陈肇源 | September 1973 | 19 July 1976 | |
| Ma Muming | 马牧鸣 | September 1976 | June 1980 | |
| Zhang Shijie | 张世杰 | August 1980 | June 1984 | |
| Cao Yuanxin | 曹元欣 | September 1984 | April 1988 | |
| Yuan Tao | 原焘 | August 1988 | December 1993 | |
| Song Guoqing | 宋国清 | February 1994 | February 1998 | |
| Tang Yonggui | 汤永贵 | March 1998 | December 2002 | |
| Qiu Xiaoqi | 邱小琪 | January 2003 | 15 December 2008 | |
| Zhu Bangzao | 朱邦造 | January 2009 | December 2014 | |
| Lü Fan | 吕凡 | December 2014 | November 2019 | |
| Wu Haitao | 吴海涛 | April 2020 | October 2023 | |
| Yao Jing | 姚敬 | October 2023 | | |

== See also ==
- China–Spain relations
