= List of ambassadors of China to Laos =

The ambassador of China to Laos is the official representative of the People's Republic of China to Laos.

== List of representatives ==
Name	Name (Chinese)	Tenure begins	Tenure ends	Note
Liu Chun	刘春	July 1962	January 1967	
Li Lianping	李联平	January 1967	1969	
Yue Daiheng	岳岱衡	1969	1971	
Guo Ying	国鹰	1971	1973	
Ling Zhaoyuan	凌照远	1973	May 1974	
Guo Ying	国鹰	May 1974	October 1977	
Xu Huang	徐晃	December 1977	July 1980	
Zhang Zhiguo	张志国	1984	1987	
Zhuang Muqiu	庄慕求	1987	1988	
Liang Feng	梁枫	June 1988	May 1991	
Huang Guocai	黄国材	May 1991	February 1994	
Li Jiazhong	李家忠	March 1994	October 1995	
Zhao Jiahua	赵家骅	November 1995	December 2000	
Liu Zhengxiu	刘正修	January 2001	August 2003	
Liu Yongxing	刘永兴	August 2003	February 2007	
Pan Guangxue	潘广学	March 2007	February 2010	
Bu Jianguo	布建国	March 2010	May 2013	
Guan Huabing	关华兵	June 2013	January 2017	
Wang Wentian	王文天	July 2017	October 2018	
Jiang Zaidong	姜再冬	October 2018	5 July 2024	
Fang Hong	方虹	5 July 2024	Incumbent	

== See also ==
- China–Laos relations
