= Li Xinyuan =

Chinese politician (born 1962)

- 李新元

Communist Party Secretary of Guigang
- In office December 2015 – February 2021
- Mayor: Nong Rong; He Luchun
- Preceded by: Wang Ke
- Succeeded by: He Luchun

Mayor of Guigang
- In office February 2015 – December 2015
- Party Secretary: Wang Ke
- Preceded by: Li Ningbo
- Succeeded by: Nong Rong

Mayor of Qinzhou
- In office February 2013 – February 2015
- Party Secretary: Xiao Yingzi
- Preceded by: Xiao Yingzi
- Succeeded by: Tang Zongyuan

Personal details
- Born: October 1962 (age 63–64) Taixing, Jiangsu, China
- Party: Chinese Communist Party (1989–2021; expelled)
- Education: Huazhong University of Science and Technology; Central Party School of the Chinese Communist Party

Li Xinyuan (Chinese: 李新元; pinyin: Lǐ Xīnyuán; born October 1962) is a former Chinese politician who served as mayor and party secretary of Guigang in Guangxi. He was investigated by China's top anti-graft agency in March 2021. He was a representative of the 19th National Congress of the Chinese Communist Party.

== Biography ==
Li was born in Taixing, Jiangsu, in October 1962. Beginning in 1980, he served in several posts in Liuzhou Compressor General Factory (柳州压缩机总厂), including worker, deputy director, general manager, and chairman.

Li joined the Chinese Communist Party (CCP) in March 1989, and got involved in politics in April 2003, when he was appointed deputy party secretary and director of Liuzhou Economic Commission. He was vice mayor of Laibin in September 2007, and held that office until April 2009, when he was assigned to deputy secretary-general of Guangxi and deputy director of its General Office. In August 2011, he was transferred to Wuzhou and admitted to member of the standing committee of the CCP Wuzhou Municipal Committee, the city's top authority. He became mayor of Qinzhou in February 2013 before being assigned to the similar position in Guigang in February 2015. In December 2015, he rose to become party secretary, the top political position in the city. In February 2021, he was appointed party branch secretary of the Agriculture and Rural Affairs Department of Guangxi.

=== Downfall ===
On 16 March 2021, he was put under investigation for alleged "serious violations of discipline and laws" by the Central Commission for Discipline Inspection (CCDI), the party's internal disciplinary body, and the National Supervisory Commission, the highest anti-corruption agency of China. On November 22, he was expelled from the CCP and dismissed from public office.

Government offices
Preceded by Xiao Yingzi	Mayor of Qinzhou; 2013–2015	Succeeded by Tang Zongyuan
Preceded by Li Ningbo	Mayor of Guigang; 2015	Succeeded by Nong Rong
Party political offices
Preceded by Wang Ke	Communist Party Secretary of Guigang; 2015–2021	Succeeded by He Luchun
