= Xiao Yingzi =

Chinese politician

- 肖莺子

Vice Chaiwoman of the Hainan Provincial Committee of the Chinese People's Political Consultative Conference
- Incumbent
- Assumed office January 2022
- Chairman: Mao Wanchun

Personal details
- Born: March 1963 (age 63) Laibin, Guangxi, China
- Party: Chinese Communist Party
- Education: Zhongnan University of Economics and Law; Guangxi University

Chinese name
- Simplified Chinese: 肖莺子
- Traditional Chinese: 肖鶯子
Transcriptions
Standard Mandarin
- Hanyu Pinyin: Xiāo Yīngzǐ

Xiao Yingzi (Chinese: 肖莺子; born March 1963) is a Chinese politician of Zhuang ethnicity currently serving as vice chairwoman of the Hainan Provincial Committee of the Chinese People's Political Consultative Conference.

He was a representative of the 19th National Congress of the Chinese Communist Party and an alternate of the 19th Central Committee of the Chinese Communist Party. He was a delegate to the 12th National People's Congress.

== Biography ==
Xiao was born in Laibin, Guangxi, in March 1963. In 1980, she entered Hubei University of Finance and Economics (now Zhongnan University of Economics and Law), majoring in national economic planning and management. After graduating in 1984, she became a teacher at Nanning Economic Cadre School.

In July 1986, she was assigned to assistant economist of Nanning Planning Commission Planned Economy Research Institute, and worked for more than three years. She joined the Chinese Communist Party (CCP) in December 1987. In December 1989, she was despatched to Nanning Municipal Planning Commission, and eventually becoming deputy director in December 1995. In July 1998, she was named acting governor of Xingning District, confirmed in January 1999. In August 2000, she was transferred to Yongxin District and appointed party secretary, the top political position in the district. In August 2003, she was chosen as director of Nanning Development Planning Commission, which was reshuffled as the Nanning Development and Reform Commission in July 2004. In September 2004, she became vice mayor of Nanning, in addition to serving as head of the Publicity Department since September 2006. She served as mayor of Qinzhou from March 2010 to February 2013, and party secretary, the top political position in the city, from January 2013 to March 2017. She also served as chairwoman of Qinzhou Municipal People's Congress from February 2013 to March 2017.

In March 2017, Xiao was admitted to member of the Standing Committee of the CCP Hainan Provincial Committee, the province's top authority, and appointed head of the Publicity Department in April that same year. In January 2022, she was chosen as vice chairwoman of the Hainan Provincial Committee of the Chinese People's Political Consultative Conference, the province's top political advisory body.

Government offices
Preceded by Zhang Xiaoqin	Mayor of Qinzhou; 2010–2013	Succeeded by Li Xinyuan
Party political offices
Preceded by Zhang Xiaoqin	Communist Party Secretary of Qinzhou; 2013–2017	Succeeded by Wang Gebing
Preceded by Xu Jun	Head of Publicity Department of Hainan Provincial Committee of the Chinese Communist Party; 2017–2022	Succeeded by Wang Bin
