= Lu Weizhao =

Chinese diplomat

Lu Weizhao (Chinese: 陆维钊) (1920 – November 1, 2015) was a Chinese diplomat. He was born in Nantong, Jiangsu. He joined the Chinese Communist Party in 1941. He was Ambassador of the People's Republic of China to Pakistan (1974–1979), Syria (1979–1983) and Algeria (1983–1985).

Preceded by Zhang Tong	Ambassador of China to Pakistan; 1974–1979	Succeeded by Xu Yixin
Preceded by Cao Keqiang	Ambassador of China to Syria; 1979–1983	Succeeded by Lin Zhaonan
Preceded by Xu Ming	Ambassador of China to Algeria; 1983–1985	Succeeded by Jin Sen
