= List of ambassadors of China to Singapore =

Coordinates: 1°18′13″N 103°49′16″E

Ambassador of China to Singapore
- National emblem of China
- Incumbent; Cao Zhongming since April 2024
- Inaugural holder: Hoo Ah Kay
- Formation: 1 October 1877; 148 years ago

The ambassador of China to Singapore is the official representative of the People's Republic of China to the Republic of Singapore.

== List of representatives to British Singapore ==
=== Government of the Qing dynasty ===
Name (other spelling)	Took office	Left office	Ref.
Hoo Ah Kay	October 1877	1 March 1880	
Su Kwei-Ching 蘇溎清	1 March 1880	1 September 1881	
Tso Ping Lung 左秉隆	1 September 1881	1 May 1891	
Huang Zunxian	1 May 1891	1 July 1894	
Cheong Fatt Tze	1 July 1894	1 January 1897	
Liu Yu-lin 劉玉麟	1 January 1897	1 May 1899	
Luo Zhongyao 羅忠堯	1 May 1899	1 January 1902	
Wu Shiqi 吳世奇	1 January 1902	1 May 1902	
Feng Yi 鳳儀	1 May 1902	1 January 1906	
Sun Shiding 孫士鼎	1 January 1906	1 October 1907	
Tso Ping Lung 左秉隆	1 October 1907	1 October 1910	
Su Ruizhao 蘇銳釗	1 October 1910	1 October 1911	

=== Beiyang government of the Republic of China ===
Name (other spelling)	Took office	Left office	Ref.
Hu Wei Xian 胡惟賢	21 September 1912	19 October 1918	
Luo Chang 羅昌	19 October 1917	25 January 1919	
Wu Huang 伍璜	25 January 1919	21 September 1921	
Luo Chang 羅昌	21 September 1921	13 November 1923	
Zhou Guoxian	13 November 1923	22 November 1924	
Ma Tingliang 馬廷亮	22 November 1924	19 January 1925	
Chia Wen Yen 賈文燕	19 January 1925	4 February 1926	
Feng Xiangguang 馮祥光	4 February 1926	19 July 1926	
Ouyang Kee 歐陽祺	19 July 1926	26 May 1927	

=== Nationalist government of the Republic of China ===
(For representatives of the Republic of China (Taiwan) after 1979, view Taipei Representative Office in Singapore.)

Name (other spelling)	Took office	Left office	Ref.
Li Chen 李駿	26 May 1927	1 January 1929	
Tang Liu 唐榴	1 January 1929		
Chen Chang-lok 陳長樂	1 January 1930	1932	
Huang Yen Kai 刁作謙	1 January 1933	1 January 1936	
Kao Ling-po 高淩百	1 September 1936	1 January 1941	
Wu Po-sheng 伍伯勝	1 January 1946	1 January 1950	

== List of representatives to the Republic of Singapore ==
=== People's Republic of China ===
Name (other spelling)	Took office	Left office	Ref.
Zhang Qing 张青	1 December 1990	1 February 1993	
Yang Wenchang 杨文昌	1 March 1993	1 June 1995	
Fu Xuezhang	1 July 1995	1 July 1997	
Chen Baoliu 陈宝鎏	1 August 1997	1 August 2000	
Zhang Jiuhuan 张九桓	1 August 2000	1 April 2004	
Zhang Yun 张云	1 May 2004	1 February 2007	
Zhang Xiaokang 张小康	1 March 2007	1 April 2010	
Wei Wei 魏苇	1 May 2010	1 December 2012	
Duan Jielong 段洁龙	1 May 2013	1 May 2015	
Chen Xiaodong	1 June 2015	5 August 2017	
Hong Xiaoyong	1 March 2018	30 March 2022	
Sun Haiyan	31 May 2022	29 July 2023	
Cao Zhongming 曹忠明	30 April 2024	incumbent	

== See also ==
- China–Singapore relations
- List of ambassadors of Singapore to China
