= Shi Hongwei =

Chinese diplomat

- 史宏微

Chinese Ambassador to Syria
- Incumbent
- Assumed office 29 January 2023
- Preceded by: Feng Biao

Personal details
- Born: December 1972 (age 52); China
- Political party: Chinese Communist Party

Shi Hongwei (Chinese: 史宏微; pinyin: Shǐ Hóngwēi; born December 1972) is a Chinese diplomat who is the current Chinese Ambassador to Syria, in office since 29 January 2023.

== Career ==
Born in December 1972, Shi worked the minister-counselor in the Chinese Embassy in Saudi Arabia and then deputy director of the Department of West Asian and North African Affairs of the Ministry of Foreign Affairs.

On 29 January 2023, he succeeded Feng Biao as Chinese Ambassador to Syria.

Diplomatic posts
Preceded by Feng Biao	Chinese Ambassador to Syria; 2023–present	Incumbent
