= Sun Haiyan =

Chinese diplomat

- 孙海燕
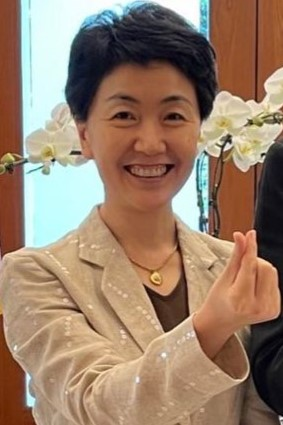
- Sun in 2022

Deputy Head of the International Department of the Chinese Communist Party
- Incumbent
- Assumed office June 2023

Chinese Ambassador to Singapore
- In office May 2022 – July 2023
- Preceded by: Hong Xiaoyong
- Succeeded by: Cao Zhongming

Personal details
- Born: April 1972 (age 53–54) Hejian, Hebei, China
- Party: Chinese Communist Party

Sun Haiyan (Chinese: 孙海燕; born April 1972) is a Chinese diplomat and politician who has served as the deputy head of the International Department of the Chinese Communist Party since June 2023. She previously served as the Chinese Ambassador to Singapore from May 2022 to July 2023.

== Early life ==
Born in 1972 in the city of Hejian, Sun joined the Chinese Communist Party in April 1990. She studied abroad at Kyushu University's School of Law in Japan and earned master's degree in Japanese law in 1997. The same year, she graduated from Peking University Law School with a master's degree in law and in 2008, she received a doctorate in law from the same institution.

== Political and diplomatic career ==
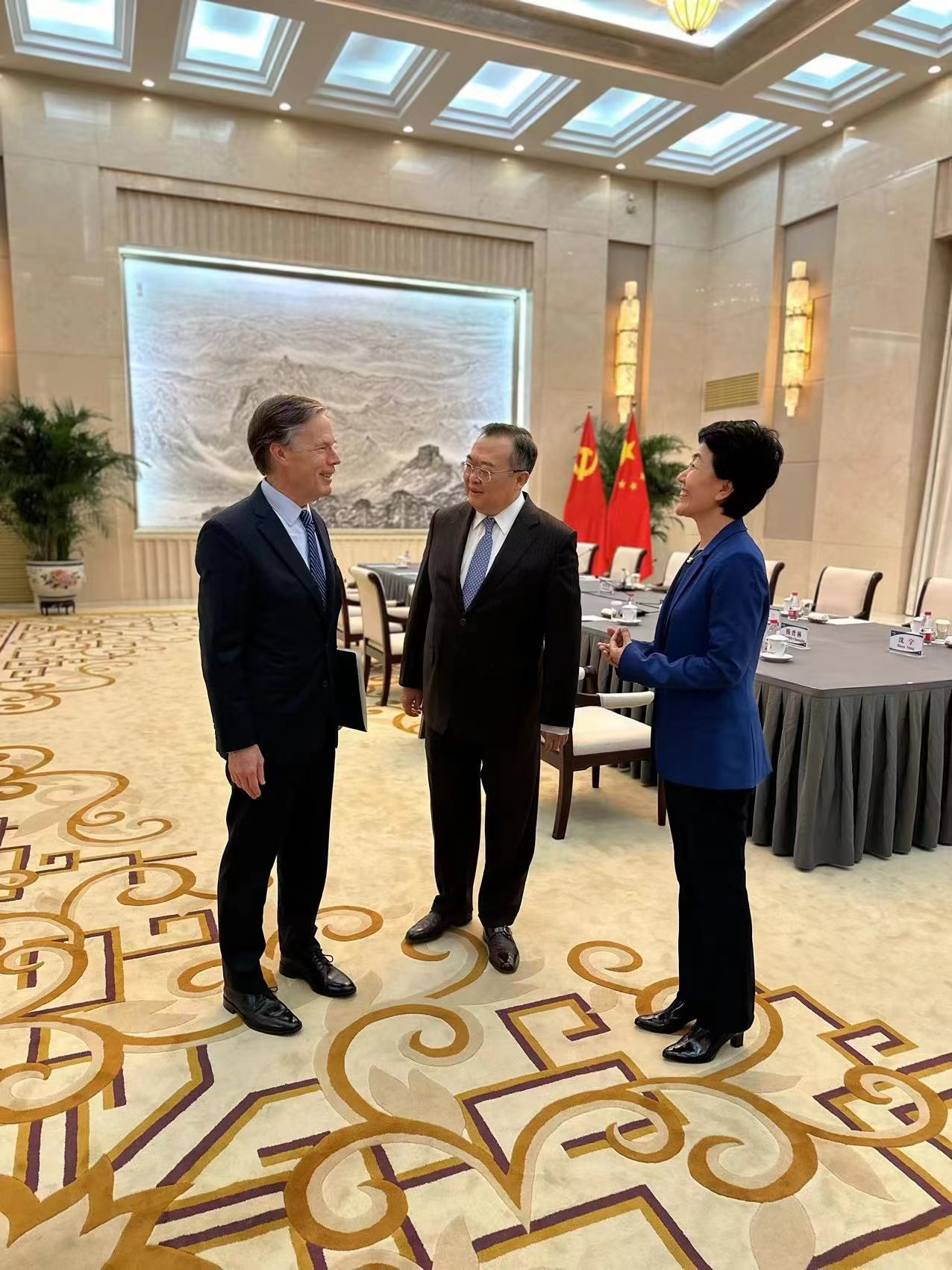
Sun and Liaison Department head Liu Jianchao meeting with US Ambassador to China R. Nicholas Burns (2023)

In December 1997, she began working at the International Liaison Department of the Chinese Communist Party, which was responsible in cultivating relations with foreign political parties worldwide. During her tenure in the International Liaison Department, she held variety of roles such as Director of the Research Office, and Director-General of the China Centre for Contemporary World Studies and the Public Information and Communication Bureau, and spokeswoman of the department.

From March 2008 to January 2009, Sun was temporary deputy secretary of the Zhangdian District Committee of the city of Zibo, Shandong. From 2009, she served as the Director-General of the First Bureau of the Liaison Department, which was responsible for exchanges with countries in South and Southeast Asia.

=== Ambassador to Singapore (2022-2023) ===
On 16 May 2022, she was appointed as the Ambassador of the People's Republic of China to the Republic of Singapore, making her the first Chinese ambassador to Singapore who had not been a veteran of the Foreign Ministry of China. According to international relations expert Pang Zhongying, Sun's links with the Liaison Department and her expertise in inter-party diplomacy could play a key role in strengthening relations between China and Singapore's ruling People’s Action Party. On 31 May, she presented her credentials to President of Singapore Halimah Yacob. According to The Washington Post, Sun's first engagement after being appointed as ambassador to Singapore was a meeting with a group of Singaporean Chinese-language online outlets. According to an editor present at the meeting, Sun urged them to avoid reporting sensitive topics such as human rights issues in Xinjiang and Tibet, and that they should tell positive stories about China. On 16 August 2022, following Speaker of the United States House of Representatives Nancy Pelosi's visit to Taiwan on 2 August 2022, Sun issued a statement stating that the visit "not only violates the U.S. own official one China principle, infringes on China's sovereignty, but also threatens the whole region's stability" and will not "allow this unprovoked challenge to our sovereignty pass without appropriate responses."

In September 2022, she oversaw the signing of the extension agreement of pandas Kai Kai and Jia Jia stay at Mandai Wildlife Reserve till 2027. In March 2023, she was among the officials who accompanied Prime Minister of Singapore Lee Hsien Loong during his visit to Guangdong, China. In May 2023, she oversaw the simplification for Singapore residents to apply for Chinese visa by increasing the number of daily appointments for emergency visa applications by the visa application service centre at the embassy. Sun helped organize Chief Executive of Hong Kong John Lee Ka-chiu's visit to Singapore in July 2023. She also oversaw interactions between business communities in China and Singapore.

Sun's tenure as ambassador to Singapore ended in July 2023, following her appointment as the deputy minister of the International Liaison Department of the Chinese Communist Party in June 2023, making her the shortest serving Chinese Ambassador to Singapore. She became the first female to serve as deputy minister in the Liaison Department. At her farewell reception, she praised the Chinese associations and business communities in Singapore for being the "foundation of bilateral relations over long term" and that she was being called back to China to "join the great journey of [China’s] modernization”. She returned to China at the end of July 2023. Former Minister of Foreign Affairs of Singapore George Yeo described Sun's tenure as ambassador as "short but remarkable".

=== International Department (2023-present) ===
In August 2025, Reuters reported that she is under detention by Chinese authorities due to her connection with Liu Jianchao. Hours following the publication of the report by Reuters, Sun was seen attending Indian Independence Day celebrations at the Indian Embassy in Beijing. According to sources interviewed by Lianhe Zaobao, Sun is currently working as normal and that news of her detention was false.

== Personal life ==
Sun is married and has a daughter.

Diplomatic posts
Preceded by Hong Xiaoyong	Chinese Ambassador to Singapore; 2022-2023	Succeeded by Cao Zhongming
