= Zhu Bangzao =

Chinese diplomat

- 朱邦造
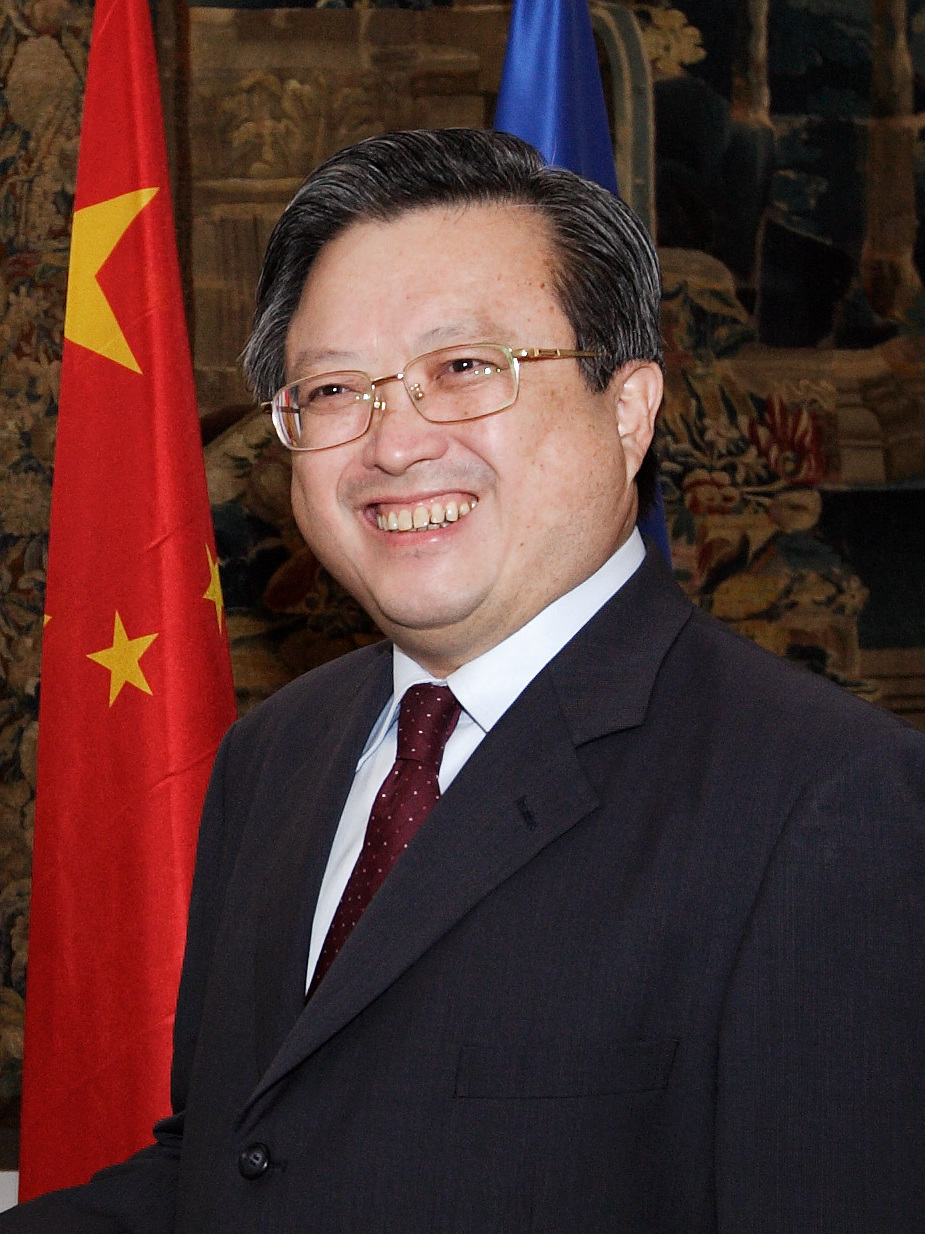
- Zhu in 2013

Chinese Ambassador to Andorra and Spain
- In office January 2009 – December 2014
- Preceded by: Qiu Xiaoqi
- Succeeded by: Lü Fan

Chinese Ambassador to Switzerland
- In office March 2004 – March 2008
- Preceded by: Wu Chuanfu
- Succeeded by: Dong Jinyi

Chinese Ambassador to Tunisia and the State of Palestine
- In office January 2002 – August 2003
- Preceded by: Mu Wen
- Succeeded by: Liu Yuhe

Personal details
- Born: 1952 (age 73–74) Yixing County, Jiangsu, China
- Party: Chinese Communist Party
- Spouse: Chen Lichun
- Children: 1
- Education: Beijing Foreign Studies University; University of Geneva; École nationale d'administration

Zhu Bangzao (Chinese: 朱邦造; pinyin: Zhū Bāngzào; born 1952) is a retired Chinese diplomat who served as Ambassador: to Tunisia and the State of Palestine (2002–03), Switzerland (2004–08), and Andorra and Spain (2009–14).

== Biography ==
Zhu was born in Yixing County, Jiangsu, in 1952. During the Cultural Revolution, he taught at Nanjing Foreign Language School between 1971 and 1973. In 1973, he was admitted to Beijing Foreign Studies University. majoring in French language. After graduating in 1977, he was sent abroad to study at the University of Geneva on government scholarships.

Zhu returned to China in 1979 and joined the foreign service that same year and has served primarily in the Translation Office of the Ministry of Foreign Affairs. In 1988, he become secretary of the Chinese Embassy in the France, a position he held until 1992, when he was recalled to the Ministry of Foreign Affairs as director and counsellor of the Western European Department. In 1996, he was made counsellor of the Chinese Embassy in Belgium and the European Community. In 1997, he was appointed as spokesperson for the Ministry of Foreign Affairs and later was prompted to director of the Foreign Ministry Information Department. In 2001, he had been appointed as Chinese Ambassador to Tunisia and the State of Palestine, taking over from Mu Wen. In March 2004, he succeeded Wu Chuanfu as Chinese Ambassador to Switzerland, serving in that position from 2004 to 2008. In January 2009, President Hu Jintao named him Chinese Ambassador to Andorra and Spain, and he held the posts from 2009 until 2014.

== Personal life ==
Zhu married Chen Lichun (陈立春) and the couple has a son.

Diplomatic posts
Preceded by Mu Wen	Chinese Ambassador to Tunisia and the State of Palestine; 2002–2003	Succeeded by Liu Yuhe
Preceded by Wu Chuanfu	Chinese Ambassador to Switzerland; 2004–2008	Succeeded by Dong Jinyi
Preceded by Qiu Xiaoqi	Chinese Ambassador to Andorra and Spain; 2009–2014	Succeeded by Lü Fan
