= Qiu Xiaoqi =

Chinese diplomat

- 邱小琪

Chinese Ambassador to Mexico
- In office September 2013 – May 2019
- Preceded by: Zeng Gang
- Succeeded by: Zhu Qingqiao

Chinese Ambassador to Brazil
- In office March 2009 – December 2012
- Preceded by: Chen Duqing
- Succeeded by: Li Jinzhang

Chinese Ambassador to Andorra and Spain
- In office January 2003 – December 2008
- Preceded by: Tang Yonggui
- Succeeded by: Zhu Bangzao

Chinese Ambassador to Bolivia
- In office September 1996 – August 1998
- Preceded by: Tang Mingxin
- Succeeded by: Wu Changsheng

Personal details
- Born: June 1956 (age 70) Luchuan County, Guangxi, China
- Party: Chinese Communist Party
- Children: 1
- Education: Beijing Foreign Studies University

Qin Xiaoqi (Chinese: 邱小琪; pinyin: Qiū Xiǎoqí; born June 1956) is a Chinese diplomat who serves as the Special Representative of the Chinese Government on Latin American Affairs. He previously served four times as Ambassador: to Bolivia (1996–98), Andorra and Spain (2003–08), Brazil (2009–2011), and Mexico (2013–2019). He is a member of the 13th National Committee of the Chinese People's Political Consultative Conference.

== Biography ==
Qiu was born in Luchuan County, Guangxi, in June 1956 and graduated from Beijing Foreign Studies University.

Qiu joined the Chinese Communist Party (CCP) in 1974. He joined the foreign service in 1979 and has served primarily in South America. In September 1996, he had been appointed as Chinese Ambassador to Bolivia, taking over from Tang Mingxin. He served as Chinese Ambassador to Andorra and Spain from 2003 until 2008, when he was succeeded by Zhu Bangzao. He was designated by President Hu Jintao in March 2009 to replace Chen Duqing as Chinese Ambassador to Brazil. In September 2013, he was made Chinese Ambassador to Mexico, and he held this post from 2013 until 2019. On 2021, he was appointed as the Special Representative of the Chinese Government on Latin American Affairs.

On 2 January 2026, on the same day that Nicolás Maduro was captured by the United States, a Chinese delegation which included Qiu met with Maduro at the Miraflores Palace.

== Personal life ==
He is married and has a son studying in the UACJ.

== Honours and awards ==
- 2008 Order of Civil Merit
- 2011 Order of the Southern Cross
- 2019 Order of the Aztec Eagle

Diplomatic posts
Preceded by Tang Mingxin	Chinese Ambassador to Bolivia; 1996–1998	Succeeded by Wu Changsheng
Preceded by Tang Yonggui	Chinese Ambassador to Andorra and Spain; 2003–2008	Succeeded by Zhu Bangzao
Preceded by Chen Duqing	Chinese Ambassador to Brazil; 2009–2012	Succeeded by Li Jinzhang
Preceded by Zeng Gang	Chinese Ambassador to Mexico; 2013–2019	Succeeded by Zhu Qingqiao
