= Yao Jing =

Chinese diplomat

- 姚敬
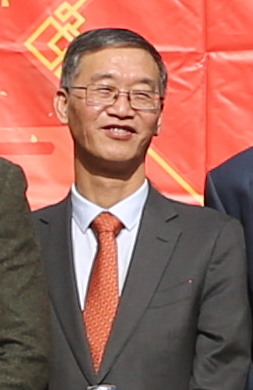
- Yao Jing, celebrating Chinese New Year in València, 2025.

Chinese Ambassador to Pakistan
- In office December 14, 2017 – September 2020
- Preceded by: Sun Weidong
- Succeeded by: Nong Rong

Chinese Ambassador to Afghanistan
- In office October 2015 – October 2017
- Preceded by: Deng Xijun
- Succeeded by: Liu Jinsong

Personal details
- Born: April 1969 (age 57) Ningbo, China
- Party: Chinese Communist Party
- Children: 1

Yao Jing (Chinese: 姚敬; pinyin: Yáo Jìng; born April 1969) is a Chinese diplomat, serving as Chinese Ambassador to Spain and Andorra since 2023. Previously he served as Chinese Ambassador to Afghanistan between 2015 and 2017 and Chinese Ambassador to Pakistan between 2017 and 2020.

== Biography ==
Born in April 1969, Yao entered the Ministry of Foreign Affairs in 1991. He held various posts at the Ministry of Foreign Affairs until he was appointed Chinese Ambassador to Afghanistan in October 2015. On October 11, 2017, President of Afghanistan Ashraf Ghani bestowed its "Said Dzemarudin Afghani" medal upon him for his efforts to promote China-Afghanistan bilateral relations. On December 14, 2017, he was appointed and then approved by 12th Standing Committee of the National People's Congress as the Chinese Ambassador to Pakistan, replacing Sun Weidong.

In January 2021, he was appointed director of the Foreign Affairs Office of the People's Government of Xinjiang Uygur Autonomous Region.

Diplomatic posts
Preceded by Deng Xijun	Chinese Ambassador to Afghanistan; 2015–2017	Succeeded by Liu Jinsong
Preceded by Sun Weidong	Chinese Ambassador to Pakistan; 2017–2020	Succeeded by Nong Rong
