= Xu Yixin =

Chinese politician (1911–1994)

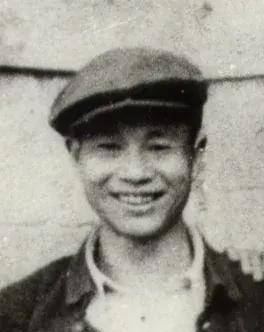
- Xu in 1945
- Born: November 14, 1911
- Died: December 30, 1994 (aged 83)

Xu Yixin (Chinese: 徐以新) (November 14, 1911 – December 30, 1994) was an associate of the 28 Bolsheviks. He is the sometimes known as the 29th Bolshevik. Since he alternated his political stances between left wing and right wing beliefs, the group is sometimes called the 28 and a half Bolsheviks. He was born in Zhejiang Province and educated at Moscow Sun Yat-sen University in the Soviet Union. He joined the Chinese Communist Party in 1930. After the founding of the People's Republic of China, he served as ambassador to Albania (1954–1957), Norway (1958–1962), Syria (1962–1965), and Pakistan (1979–1982).

Preceded by new office	Ambassador of China to Albania; 1954–1957	Succeeded by Luo Shigao
Preceded by Wang Youping	Ambassador of China to Norway; 1958–1962	Succeeded by Qin Lizhen
Preceded by Chen Zhifang in Cairo, Syria belonged to the United Arab Republic	Ambassador of China to Syria; 1962–1965	Succeeded by Chen Tan
Preceded by	Ambassador of China to Pakistan; 1979–1982	Succeeded by
