= List of ambassadors of China to Syria =

Chinese Ambassador to Syria
- Incumbent; Shi Hongwei since 29 January 2023
- Inaugural holder: Chen Zhifang
- Formation: December 1956; 69 years ago

The Chinese ambassador to Syria is the official representative of the People's Republic of China to the Syrian Arab Republic.

== List of representatives ==
Diplomatic agrément/Diplomatic accreditation	Ambassador	Chinese language zh:中国驻叙利亚大使列表	Observations	List of premiers of the People's Republic of China	List of presidents of Syria	Term end
December 1956	Chen Zhifang	zh:陈志方		Zhou Enlai	Shukri al-Quwatli	April 1958
May 1962	Xu Yixin	zh:徐以新		Zhou Enlai	Nazim al-Kudsi	December 1965
April 1966	Chen Tan	zh:陈坦		Zhou Enlai	Nureddin al-Atassi	April 1967
June 1969	Qin Jialin	zh:秦加林		Zhou Enlai	Nureddin al-Atassi	May 1974
September 1974	Cao Keqiang	zh:曹克强		Zhou Enlai	Hafez al-Assad	May 1979
September 1979	Lu Weizhao	zh:陸維釗		Hua Guofeng	Hafez al-Assad	March 1983
October 1983	Lin Zhaonan	zh:林兆南		Zhao Ziyang	Hafez al-Assad	March 1986
June 1986	Wang Changyi	zh:王昌义		Zhao Ziyang	Hafez al-Assad	March 1989
December 1988	Zhang Zhen	zh:张真		Li Peng	Hafez al-Assad	May 1993
December 1992	Li Qingyu	zh:李清玉		Li Peng	Hafez al-Assad	October 1995
August 1995	Wu Minmin	zh:吴珉珉		Li Peng	Hafez al-Assad	November 1999
August 1999	Shi Yanchun	zh:时延春	From October 1997 to November 1999 he was ambassador in Sana'a (Yemen).	Zhu Rongji	Hafez al-Assad	June 2002
April 2002	Zhou Xiuhua (PRC diplomat)	zh:周秀华	From July 2000 to August 2002 he was ambassador to Qatar.	Zhu Rongji	Bashar al-Assad	April 2007
April 2007	Li Huaxin	zh:李华新	(* April 1957) married one son.: From April 2007 to August 2011 he was Ambassador in Damascus (Syria).; From November 2005 to February 2007 he was ambassador in Baghdad (Iraq).; Since June 2016 he is ambassador in Riyadh (Saudi Arabia).	Wen Jiabao	Bashar al-Assad	August 2011
August 2011	Zhang Xun (diplomat)	zh:张迅	From June 2007 to December 2010 he was ambassador in Mauritania.; From August 2011 to April 2014 he was ambassador in Damascus (Syria).; Since October 2015 he is Ambassador to Senegal	Wen Jiabao	Bashar al-Assad	April 2014
April 2014	Wang Kejian	王克俭	On September 7, 2016 he was appointed Chinese Ambassador to Lebanon in Beirut.	Li Keqiang	Bashar al-Assad	August 11, 2016
August 11, 2016	Qi Qianjin	齐前进		Li Keqiang	Bashar al-Assad	
October 30, 2018	Feng Biao	齐前进		Li Keqiang	Bashar al-Assad	August 2022
January 29, 2023	Shi Hongwei	史宏微		Li Keqiang	Bashar al-Assad	

== See also ==
- Ambassadors of the People's Republic of China
