= List of ambassadors of China to Cambodia =

Ambassador of China to Cambodia
- ឯកអគ្គរដ្ឋទូតចិនប្រចាំនៅកម្ពុជា (Khmer) 中国驻柬埔寨大使 (Chinese)
- National emblem of China

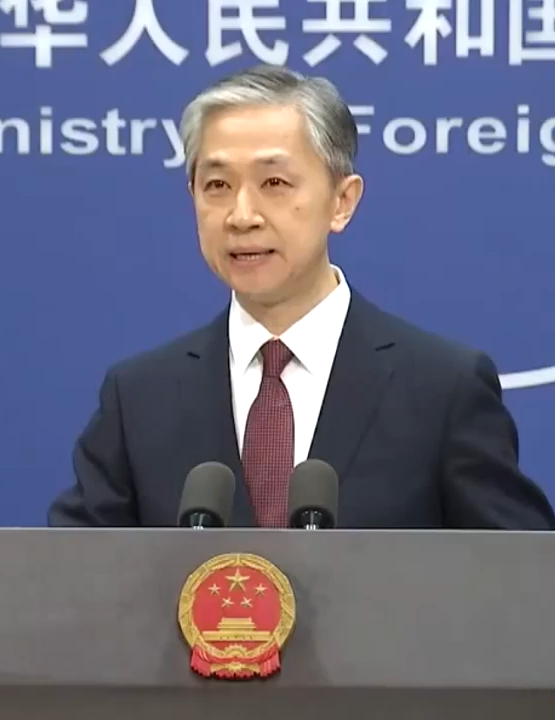
- Incumbent; Wang Wenbin since 5 July 2024
- Ministry of Foreign Affairs; Embassy of China, Phnom Penh
- Appointer: The president pursuant to a National People's Congress Standing Committee decision
- Inaugural holder: Ye Jinghao
- Formation: September 1956; 70 years ago
- Website: Chinese Embassy – Phnom Penh

The ambassador of China to Cambodia is the official representative of the People's Republic of China to the Kingdom of Cambodia.

== List of representatives ==
Name (English)	Name (Chinese)	Tenure begins	Tenure ends	Note
Ye Jinghao	叶景灏	September 1956	September 1958	
Wang Youping	王幼平	August 1958	February 1962	
Chen Shuliang	陈叔亮	February 1962	May 1967	
Zheng Sixiong	郑斯雄	1967	1969	
Kang Maozhao	康矛召	June 1969	August 1974	
Sun Hao	孙浩	August 1974	March 1982	
Shen Ping	沈平	April 1983	August 1985	
Zhang Dewei	张德维	August 1985	March 1989	
Li Shichun	李世淳	March 1989	October 1991	
Fu Xuezhang	傅学章	October 1991	September 1993	
Yang Yaozong	杨耀宗	September 1993	September 1997	
Xie Yue'e	谢月娥	September 1993	March 1997	
Yan Ting'ai	晏廷爱	May 1997	April 2000	
Ning Fukui	宁赋魁	April 2000	November 2003	
Hu Qianwen	胡乾文	January 2004	December 2005	
Zhang Jinfeng	张金凤	January 2006	March 2010	
Pan Guangxue	潘广学	March 2010	June 2013	
Bu Jianguo	布建国	July 2013	August 2016	
Xiong Bo	熊波	September 2016	September 2018	
Wang Wentian	王文天	November 2018	5 July 2024	
Wang Wenbin	汪文斌	5 July 2024	Incumbent	

== See also ==
- China–Cambodia relations
