= Chen Zhifang =

Chinese diplomat (1906-1990)

- 陈志方

Personal details
- Born: 1906
- Died: December 25, 1990 (aged 83–84)
- Occupation: diplomat

Chen Zhifang (Chinese: 陈志方; 1906 – December 25, 1990) was a Chinese diplomat. He was Ambassador of the People's Republic of China to Syria (1956–1958), Iraq (1958–1960), Uganda (1964–1970), Switzerland (1970–1975) and Vietnam (1977–1978). He was a delegate to the 5th National People's Congress.

Preceded by New office	Ambassador of China to Syria; 1956–1958	Succeeded by vacant until 1962, then Xu Yixin
Preceded by New office	Chinese Ambassador to Iraq; 1958–1960	Succeeded by Zhang Weilie
Preceded by He Ying	Chinese Ambassador to Uganda; 1964–1970	Succeeded by Ge Buhai
Preceded by Zheng Weizhi	Chinese Ambassador to Switzerland; 1970–1975	Succeeded by Li Yunchuan
Preceded by Fu Hao	Chinese Ambassador to Vietnam; 1977–1978	Succeeded by Yang Gongsu
