= Hong Xiaoyong =

Chinese diplomat

- 洪小勇

Chinese Ambassador to Singapore
- In office March 2018 – March 2022
- Preceded by: Chen Xiaodong
- Succeeded by: Sun Haiyan

Chinese Ambassador to Vietnam
- In office May 2014 – February 2018
- Preceded by: Kong Xuanyou
- Succeeded by: Xiong Bo

Personal details
- Born: March 1963 (age 63) Jiangsu, China
- Party: Chinese Communist Party

Hong Xiaoyong (Chinese: 洪小勇; born March 1963) is a diplomat who served as the Chinese Ambassador to Vietnam (2014–2018) and Singapore (2018–2022).

== Biography ==
Born in 1963 in Jiangsu Province, Hong graduated from Peking University. Following graduation, he joined the Ministry of Foreign Affairs in 1984 and served in the Asian department of the ministry from 1984 to 1985. He was appointed as a staff member and attaché at the Chinese Embassy in Japan in 1985, and served till 1989.

From 1989 to 1994, he served as attaché, third secretary, and second secretary within the Asian department. In 1994, he was appointed as second secretary at the Chinese Embassy in Japan and from 1998 to 2003, he served as second secretary, first secretary, deputy director and director of the Asian department. From 2003 to 2007, he served as counsellor to the Permanent Mission of China to the United Nations, and counselor and director of the Asian department in the ministry.

From 2007 to 2011, he served minister counselor at the Chinese Embassy in Singapore, and deputy director of the General Office of the Ministry of Foreign Affairs and counselor of the General Office of the Ministry of Foreign Affairs. From November 2011 to April 2014, Hong served as the Deputy Commissioner of the Office of the Commissioner of the Ministry of Foreign Affairs in Hong Kong.

In May 2014, he was appointed as the Ambassador Extraordinary and Plenipotentiary of the People's Republic of China to the Socialist Republic of Vietnam. On 20 May 2014, he presented his credentials to President of Vietnam Trương Tấn Sang and on 30 July 2014, at a reception hosted by Vietnamese political bureau member Nguyễn Thiện Nhân, Hong stated that relations between China and Vietnam is a "valuable asset of the two nations which should be further developed for future generations." In May 2016, just before President of the United States Barack Obama's visit to Vietnam, Hong met with Minister of Defense of Vietnam Ngô Xuân Lịch and reached an agreement regarding military cooperation between China and Vietnam. Hong's tenure as an ambassador to Vietnam ended in February 2018.

In March 2018, he was appointed as Ambassador Extraordinary and Plenipotentiary of the People's Republic of China to the Republic of Singapore. On 28 March 2018, he presented his credentials to President of Singapore Halimah Yacob. In July 2020, in an interview with Singaporean Chinese newspaper Lianhe Zaobao, Hong stated that China-Singapore relations "has grown into mutually beneficial cooperation between a large country and a small country.” Hong's tenure as ambassador to Singapore ended in March 2022.

== Awards and honors ==
- Friendship Order (Vietnam, 2018)
- “For Peace and Friendship of Nations” insignia of the Vietnam Union of Friendship Association (2018)

Diplomatic posts
Preceded by Chen Xiaodong (陈晓东)	Chinese Ambassador to Singapore; 2018-2022	Succeeded by Sun Haiyan
Preceded by Kong Xuanyou	Chinese Ambassador to Vietnam; 2014-2018	Succeeded by Xiong Bo
