= Jiang Zaidong =

Chinese diplomat (born 1970)

- 姜再冬

Chinese Ambassador to Pakistan
- Incumbent
- Assumed office September 2023
- President: Xi Jinping
- Preceded by: Nong Rong

Chinese Ambassador to Laos
- In office October 2018 – August 2023
- President: Xi Jinping
- Preceded by: Wang Wentian
- Succeeded by: Fang Hong

Personal details
- Born: February 1970 (age 56) China
- Party: Chinese Communist Party
- Children: 1

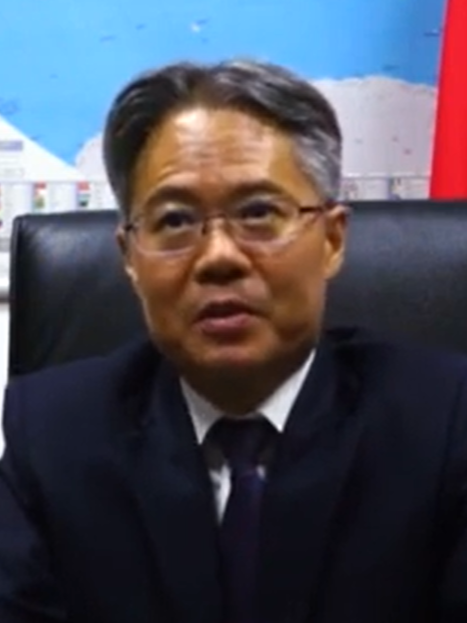

Jiang Zaidong (Chinese: 姜再冬; pinyin: Jiāng Zàidōng; born February 1970) is a Chinese diplomat, serving as Chinese ambassador to Pakistan since 2023. He served as Chinese Ambassador to Laos from October 2018 to July 2024.

== Biography ==
Born in February 1970, he joined the foreign service in 1992, and has served primarily in Vietnam. In 2017, he was appointed deputy director of Department of Asian Affairs, he remained in that position until October 2018, when he was appointed Chinese Ambassador to Laos according the National People's Congress decision. He was succeeded by Fang Hong on 5 July 2024. In September 2023, he was appointed Chinese ambassador to Pakistan, replacing Nong Rong.

== Personal life ==
He is married and has a daughter.

Diplomatic posts
Preceded by Wang Wentian	Chinese Ambassador to Laos; 2018–2024	Succeeded by Fang Hong
Preceded by Nong Rong	Chinese Ambassador to Pakistan; 2023–present	Incumbent
