= List of ambassadors of China to Tunisia =

Coordinates: 36.827382°N 10.173456°E

The Chinese ambassador to Tunisia is the official representative of the People's Republic of China to the Republic of Tunisia.

== List of representatives ==
Designated/accredited	Ambassador	Chinese language zh:中国驻突尼斯大使列表	Observations	Premier of the People's Republic of China	Head of Government of Tunisia	Term end
May 1964	Yao Nian	姚念		Zhou Enlai	Habib Bourguiba	September 1967
February 1972	Hou Yefeng	侯野烽	From 1972 to 1977 he was ambassador to Tunisia.; From 1977 to 1984 he was ambassador to Iraq.	Zhou Enlai	Hédi Nouira	May 1977
August 1977	Cui Jian (diplomat)	崔健	From 1972 to 1977 he was ambassador in Aden (South Yemen).; From 1977 to 1980 he was ambassador in Tunis (Tunisia).	Hua Guofeng	Hédi Nouira	May 1980
December 1980	Meng Yue	zh:孟钺	From 1970 to 1975 he was ambassador in Bamako (Mali).; From 1975 to 1980 he was ambassador in Sofia (Bulgaria).; From 1980 to 1983 he was ambassador in Tunis (Tunisia).	Zhao Ziyang	Mohamed Mzali	May 1983
August 1983	Xie Bangding	zh:谢邦定	(* 1921 en Zhenjiang, Jiangsu Province): In 1948 he joined the Chinese Communist Party.; 1949 was elected Chairman of the newly established National Students' Federation, and representatives of the National Federation to participate in Chinese People's first plenary session.; In 1950, he graduated from Beijing University philosophy department, go to Bula Luo served as secretary of the permanent representative of China to the International Federation of Students; also served as the State Council Culture and Education Committee.; 1951 transferred to Chinese Vice Minister of the Organization Department of the Federation of the Korean people.; CYL Central Committee and later served as Chief of the International Liaison Department, and served as "evergreen" magazine editor.; Xi'an served as the CPC Municipal Committee, deputy director of the Revolutionary Committee of the city during the Cultural Revolution.: 1978 served as vice president of the Chinese People's Association for Friendship with Foreign Countries, the secretary-general.; From 1983 to 1987 he was ambassador to Tunisia.	Zhao Ziyang	Mohamed Mzali	June 1987
March 1987	Zhu Yinglu	zh:朱应鹿	From 1988 to 1991 he was ambassador to Algeria and concurrently accredited in Tunis.; From September 1991 to December 1993 Ambassador to Egypt; From February 1994 to June 1998 he was ambassador to Oslo Norway.; In 1996 he was ambassador to Lebanon.	Li Peng	Zine el-Abidine Ben Ali	October 1991
September 1991	An Huihou	zh:安惠侯	From July 1988 to October 1991 he was ambassador to Algeria.; From December 1991 to August 1993 he was ambassador in Tunis.; From July 1996 to December 1998 he was ambassador to Lebanon.; From November 1998 to August 2001 he was ambassador to Egypt.	Li Peng	Hamed Karoui	August 1993
July 1993	Wu Chuanfu	zh:吴传福	From September 1993 to March 1998 he was ambassador to Tunis.; From July 2000 to January 2004 he was ambassador to Switzerland.	Li Peng	Hamed Karoui	March 1998
May 1997	Lv Guozeng	zh:吕国增	(* August 1951 en Hebei March 31, 2015) Deputy Minister - China Ministry of Foreign Affairs Lu Guozeng.: En 1976 entered the Ministry of Foreign Affairs, Ministry of Foreign Affairs served as clerk of the Africa Division, third secretary, deputy director, the director and staff of the Embassy of People's Republic of China in the Republic of Guinea.; In 1988 he was embassy counsellor in Mauritius.; From 1997 to July 2000 he was ambassador to Tunis.; From 2000 to 2006 he was assistant foreign minister.	Li Peng	Hamed Karoui	July 2000
April 2000	Mu Wen	zh:穆文	From December 1996 to April 2000 he was ambassador to Morocco.; From August 2000 to December 2001 he was ambassador to Tunis.	Zhu Rongji	Mohamed Ghannouchi	December 2001
October 2001	Zhu Bangzao	zh:朱邦造	(*1952 en Yixing, Jiangsu): In 1971 he was teacher in the Nanjing Foreign Language School.; from 1973 to 1977 in Beijing Foreign Language Institute French professional learning; from 1977 to 1979 studied at the Swiss Federal University of Geneva.; In 1979 Department of State to work as clerk, third secretary, deputy director, Department of State Translation Office; In 1985 studied at the French National School of Administration of the Republic; In 1986, deputy director of Department of State Translation Office, First Secretary.; In 1988 he was first secretary in Paris.; From 1992 to 1996 he was employed in the West European Department.; In 1996 he was counselor in Brussels (Belgium).; From 1997 to 2001 he was deputy director of the department of information and spokesman for the Department of State.; From 2002 to 2003 he was ambassador to Tunisia.; In 2004 he was ambassador to Bern, Switzerland.; In 2009 he was ambassador in Madrid, Spain.	Zhu Rongji	Mohamed Ghannouchi	August 2003
June 2003	Liu Yuhe	zh:刘玉和	From 2003 to 2008 he was ambassador to Tunisia.; From April 2008 to May 2014 he was Ambassador to Algeria.	Wen Jiabao	Mohamed Ghannouchi	April 2008
June 2008	Li Beifen	zh:李蓓芬	From December 2004 to April 2008 she was ambassador to Benin.	Wen Jiabao	Mohamed Ghannouchi	December 2010
December 2010	Huo Zhengde	火正德	From November 2006 to October 2010 he was ambassador to Guinea.	Wen Jiabao	Mohamed Ghannouchi	September 26, 2013
September 26, 2013	Bian Yanhua	边燕花	(* August 1957) she holds a university degree: From 1976 to 1982 she was officer in the embassy in Rome (Italy).; From 1982 to 1987 she was officer, attached to the third secretary of the Department of West European Affairs in the Ministry of Foreign Affairs.; From 1987 to 1989 she was third secretary in the embassy in Rome (Italy).; From 1989 to 1991 she was third secretary / second secretary in the Department of West European.; From 1991 to 1993 she was second secretary in the embassy in Rome (Italy).; From 1993 to 2000 she was deputy director and then director of the Department of Western Europe.; From 2000 to 2004 she was counselor in Rome (Italy).; From 2004 to 2009 she was deputy director general of Bureau of Cadres working abroad.; From 2009 to 2013 she was ambassador to Mauritius.; Since September 2013 she is ambassador in Tunis.	Li Keqiang	Ali Laarayedh	March 11, 2023
