= Wang Youping =

Chinese diplomat

- 王幼平

Ambassador of China to the Soviet Union
- In office August 1977 – July 1979
- Preceded by: Liu Xinquan
- Succeeded by: Yang Shouzheng

Ambassador of China to Malaysia
- In office January 1975 – April 1977
- Preceded by: New office
- Succeeded by: Ye Chengzhang

Ambassador of China to North Vietnam
- In office June 1969 – August 1974
- Preceded by: Zhu Qiwen
- Succeeded by: Fu Hao

Ambassador of China to Cuba
- In office May 1964 – January 1969
- Preceded by: Shen Jian
- Succeeded by: Zhang Dequn

Ambassador of China to Cambodia
- In office September 1958 – March 1961
- Preceded by: New office
- Succeeded by: Chen Shuliang

Ambassador of China to Norway
- In office June 1955 – April 1958
- Preceded by: New office
- Succeeded by: Xu Yixin

Ambassador of China to Romania
- In office August 1950 – November 1954
- Preceded by: New office
- Succeeded by: Ke Bainian

Personal details
- Born: Wang Jitan; 1910 Huantai County, Shandong, Republic of China
- Died: 1995 (aged 84–85) Beijing, People's Republic of China
- Party: Chinese Communist Party

Military service
- Allegiance: Republic of China
- Branch/service: National Revolutionary Army; Chinese Red Army; People's Liberation Army Ground Force
- Years of service: 1930–1949
- Unit: 26th Route Army; 5th Legion; Second Field Army

Chinese name
- Chinese: 王幼平
Transcriptions
Standard Mandarin
- Hanyu Pinyin: Wáng Yòupíng

Wang Jitan
- Simplified Chinese: 王际坦
- Traditional Chinese: 王際坦
Transcriptions
Standard Mandarin
- Hanyu Pinyin: Wáng Jìtǎn

Wang Youping (Chinese: 王幼平) (August 10, 1910– March 28, 1995) was a Chinese diplomat. He was a veteran of the Second Sino-Japanese War and the Chinese Civil War.

== Biography ==
Wang joined the Chinese Red Army in 1931 and became a member of the Chinese Communist Party (CCP) in April 1931. He participated in the Long March and served in the army until the founding of the People's Republic of China.

In November 1949, Wang began working in the Ministry of Foreign Affairs of the People's Republic of China. He served as the first Chinese ambassador to four countries: Romania (1950–1954), Norway (1955–1958), Cambodia (1958–1961), and Malaysia (1975–1977). He also served as ambassador to Cuba (1964–1969), North Vietnam (1969–1974), and the Soviet Union (1977–1979).

In March 1952, Wang attended the second National Congress of the Party of Labor of Albania as a representative of the CCP. From September to December 1979, he held the position of Vice Minister of Foreign Affairs. During this time, he led the Chinese delegation to Moscow twice in the rank of Special Representative of the Chinese government, participating in negotiations on Sino-Soviet relations. From December 1981 to April 1982, he served as Advisor to the Minister of Foreign Affairs.

== Honors ==
- Royal Order of Sahametrei (Cambodia), awarded in Phnom Penh on February 4, 1962)

Diplomatic posts
Preceded by New office	Ambassador of China to Romania; 1950–1954	Succeeded by Ke Bainian
Preceded by New office	Ambassador of China to Norway; 1955–1958	Succeeded by Xu Yixin
Preceded by New office	Ambassador of China to Cambodia; 1958–1961	Succeeded by Chen Shuliang
Preceded by Shen Jian	Ambassador of China to Cuba; 1964–1969	Succeeded by Zhang Dequn
Preceded by Zhu Qiwen	Ambassador of China to North Vietnam; 1969–1974	Succeeded by Fu Hao
Preceded by New office	Chinese Ambassador to Malaysia; 1975–1977	Succeeded by Ye Chengzhang
Preceded by Liu Xinquan	Ambassador of China to the Soviet Union; 1977–1979	Succeeded by Yang Shouzheng
