= List of heads of state of Vietnam =

This article lists the heads of state of modern Vietnam since 1945, from the establishment of the Empire of Vietnam to the present day.

== Empire of Vietnam (1945) ==
No.	Portrait	Name (Birth–Death)	Reign			House	Claim
No.	Portrait	Name (Birth–Death)	Start	End	Duration	House	Claim
1		Bảo Đại (1913–1997)	11 March 1945	25 August 1945	167 days	Nguyễn	Son of Khải Định

== North Vietnam ==
=== Democratic Republic of Vietnam (1945–76) ===
Status

Denotes Acting President

No.	Portrait	Name (Birth–Death)	Term of office			Political party
No.	Portrait	Name (Birth–Death)	Took office	Left office	Time in office	Political party
President of the Democratic Republic of Vietnam
1		Hồ Chí Minh (1890–1969)	6 January 1946	2 September 1969	23 years, 239 days	Indochinese Communist Party (until 1951); Worker's Party of Vietnam (from 1951)
—		Huỳnh Thúc Kháng (1876–1947)	31 May 1946	21 September 1946	113 days	Independent
—		Tôn Đức Thắng (1888–1980)	3 September 1969	22 September 1969	19 days	Worker's Party of Vietnam
2		Tôn Đức Thắng (1888–1980)	22 September 1969	2 July 1976	6 years, 284 days	Worker's Party of Vietnam

== South Vietnam ==
=== State of Vietnam (1949–55) ===
Status

Denotes Acting Chief of the State

No.	Portrait	Name (Birth–Death)	Term of office			Political party
No.	Portrait	Name (Birth–Death)	Took office	Left office	Time in office	Political party
Chief of the State of Vietnam
1		Bảo Đại (1913–1997)	13 June 1949	30 April 1955	5 years, 321 days	Independent
—		Ngô Đình Diệm (1901–1963)	30 April 1955	26 October 1955	179 days	Personalist Labor Revolutionary Party

=== Republic of Vietnam (1955–75) ===
Status

Denotes Acting President

No.	Portrait	Name (Birth–Death)	Elected	Term of office			Political party
No.	Portrait	Name (Birth–Death)	Elected	Took office	Left office	Time in office	Political party
President of the Republic of Vietnam
1		Ngô Đình Diệm (1901–1963)	1961	26 October 1955	2 November 1963	8 years, 7 days	Personalist Labor Revolutionary Party
Chief of State of the Republic of Vietnam
2		Dương Văn Minh (1916–2001)	—	2 November 1963	16 August 1964	288 days	Military
3		Nguyễn Khánh (1927–2013)	—	16 August 1964	27 August 1964	11 days	Military
N/A		Provisional Leadership Committee (Note: Members: Dương Văn Minh, Nguyễn Khánh and Trần Thiện Khiêm.)		27 August 1964	8 September 1964	12 days	Military
(2)		Dương Văn Minh (1916–2001)	—	8 September 1964	24 October 1964	46 days	Military
4		Phan Khắc Sửu (1893–1970)	—	24 October 1964	14 June 1965	233 days	Independent
5		Nguyễn Văn Thiệu (1923–2001)	—	14 June 1965	3 September 1967	2 years, 81 days	Military
President of the Republic of Vietnam
(5)		Nguyễn Văn Thiệu (1923–2001)	1967; 1971	3 September 1967	21 April 1975	7 years, 230 days	Military (until 1969)
(5)		Nguyễn Văn Thiệu (1923–2001)	1967; 1971	3 September 1967	21 April 1975	7 years, 230 days	National Social Democratic Front (from 1969)
6		Trần Văn Hương (1902–1982)	—	21 April 1975	28 April 1975	7 days	Independent
(2)		Dương Văn Minh (1916–2001)	—	28 April 1975	30 April 1975	2 days	Independent

=== Provisional Revolutionary Government of the Republic of South Vietnam (1969–76) ===
No.	Portrait	Name (Birth–Death)	Term of office			Political party
No.	Portrait	Name (Birth–Death)	Took office	Left office	Time in office	Political party
Chairman of the Consultative Council of the Provisional Revolutionary Government of the Republic of South Vietnam
1		Nguyễn Hữu Thọ (1910–1996)	8 June 1969	2 July 1976	7 years, 24 days	People's Revolutionary Party of Vietnam (National Liberation Front) (Note: Influenced by the Worker's Party of Vietnam.)

== Reunified Vietnam ==
=== Socialist Republic of Vietnam (1976–present) ===
Status

Denotes Acting President

No.	Portrait	Name (Birth–Death)	Term of office			Political party
No.	Portrait	Name (Birth–Death)	Took office	Left office	Time in office	Political party
President of the Socialist Republic of Vietnam
(2)		Tôn Đức Thắng (1888–1980)	2 July 1976	30 March 1980	3 years, 272 days	Communist Party of Vietnam
—		Nguyễn Hữu Thọ (1910–1996)	30 March 1980	4 July 1981	1 year, 96 days	Communist Party of Vietnam
Chairman of the Council of State of the Socialist Republic of Vietnam
3		Trường Chinh (1907–1988)	4 July 1981	18 June 1987	5 years, 349 days	Communist Party of Vietnam
4		Võ Chí Công (1912–2011)	18 June 1987	22 September 1992	5 years, 96 days	Communist Party of Vietnam
President of the Socialist Republic of Vietnam
5		Lê Đức Anh (1920–2019)	22 September 1992	24 September 1997	5 years, 2 days	Communist Party of Vietnam
6		Trần Đức Lương (1937–2025)	24 September 1997	27 June 2006	8 years, 276 days	Communist Party of Vietnam
7		Nguyễn Minh Triết (born 1942)	27 June 2006	25 July 2011	5 years, 28 days	Communist Party of Vietnam
8		Trương Tấn Sang (born 1949)	25 July 2011	2 April 2016	4 years, 252 days	Communist Party of Vietnam
9		Trần Đại Quang (1956–2018)	2 April 2016	21 September 2018	2 years, 172 days	Communist Party of Vietnam
—		Đặng Thị Ngọc Thịnh (born 1959)	21 September 2018	23 October 2018	32 days	Communist Party of Vietnam
10		Nguyễn Phú Trọng (1944–2024)	23 October 2018	5 April 2021	2 years, 164 days	Communist Party of Vietnam
11		Nguyễn Xuân Phúc (born 1954)	5 April 2021	18 January 2023	1 year, 288 days	Communist Party of Vietnam
—		Võ Thị Ánh Xuân (born 1970)	18 January 2023	2 March 2023	43 days	Communist Party of Vietnam
12		Võ Văn Thưởng (born 1970)	2 March 2023	21 March 2024	1 year, 19 days	Communist Party of Vietnam
—		Võ Thị Ánh Xuân (born 1970)	21 March 2024	22 May 2024	62 days	Communist Party of Vietnam
13		Tô Lâm (born 1957)	22 May 2024	21 October 2024	152 days	Communist Party of Vietnam
14		Lương Cường (born 1957)	21 October 2024	7 April 2026	1 year, 168 days	Communist Party of Vietnam
(13)		Tô Lâm (born 1957)	7 April 2026	Incumbent	201 days	Communist Party of Vietnam

== See also ==
- History of Vietnam (1945–present)
- List of monarchs of Vietnam
- President of Vietnam
  - List of presidents of Vietnam
  - List of spouses of Vietnamese leaders
- List of leaders of South Vietnam
