= Sun Guoxiang =

Chinese politician

- 孙国相

Vice Chairman of Liaoning Provincial People's Congress
- In office October 2018 – June 2022
- Chairman: Zhang Guoqing

Personal details
- Born: February 1965 (age 61) Andong County, Liaoning, China
- Party: Chinese Communist Party (1985–2022; expelled)
- Education: Dongbei University of Finance and Economics

Chinese name
- Simplified Chinese: 孙国相
- Traditional Chinese: 孫國相
Transcriptions
Standard Mandarin
- Hanyu Pinyin: Sūn Guóxiàng

Sun Guoxiang (Chinese: 孙国相; born February 1965) is a former Chinese politician who spent his entire career in his home-province Liaoning. He was investigated by China's top anti-graft agency in June 2022. Previously he served as vice chairman of Liaoning Provincial People's Congress. He was a delegate to the 11th National People's Congress.

== Biography ==
Sun was born in Andong County (now Donggang), Liaoning, in February 1965. He joined the Chinese Communist Party (CCP) in 1985.

He was appointed secretary of Liaoning Provincial Committee of the Communist Youth League of China in November 2002, concurrently serving as president of Liaoning Youth Federation since March 2003. In February 2008, he was named acting mayor of Panjin, confirmed in January 2009. He rose to become party secretary, the top political position in the city, in August 2010. In September 2016, he was transferred to Anshan and appointed party secretary. He took up the post of vice chairman of Liaoning Provincial People's Congress which he held from January 2018 to June 2022, although he remained party secretary of Anshan until October 2018.

=== Downfall ===
On June 2, 2022, he has been placed under investigation for "serious violations of laws and regulations" by the Central Commission for Discipline Inspection (CCDI), the party's internal disciplinary body, and the National Supervisory Commission, the highest anti-corruption agency of China. On August 30, he was expelled from the CCP and removed from public office.

On July 18, 2023, he was sentenced to life imprisonment for bribery in 97.65 million yuan.

Civic offices
Preceded by Wu Hongjian	Secretary of Liaoning Provincial Committee of the Communist Youth League of China; 2002–2008	Succeeded by Cao Aihua
Government offices
Preceded by Chen Shuzhen	Mayor of Panjin; 2009–2010	Succeeded by Jian Biao
Party political offices
Preceded by Chen Shuzhen	Communist Party Secretary of Panjin; 2010–2016	Succeeded by Gao Ke
Preceded by Wang Shiwei	Communist Party Secretary of Anshan; 2016–2018	Succeeded by Han Yuqi
