= Fu Hao (diplomat) =

Chinese diplomat (1916–2016)

Fu Hao (Chinese: 符浩; April 13, 1916 – June 17, 2016), original name Fu Zhongxiao (Chinese: 符忠孝), was a Chinese diplomat and vice-minister of the Ministry of Foreign Affairs of the People's Republic of China. He was born in Liquan County, Xianyang, Shaanxi. He was Ambassador of the People's Republic of China to North Vietnam (1974–1976), Vietnam (1976–1977) and Japan (1977–1982). He was a member of the Standing Committee of the 6th National People's Congress (1983–1988) and 7th National People's Congress (1988–1993). He was a graduate of the Beijing Foreign Studies University and Counter-Japanese Military and Political University.

Preceded by Wang Youping	Ambassador of China to North Vietnam/Vietnam; 1974–1976 (N. Vietnam),1976–1977 (Vietnam)	Succeeded by Chen Zhifang
Preceded by Chen Chu	Ambassador of China to Japan; 1977–1982	Succeeded by Song Zhiguang
