= List of ambassadors of China to Peru =

Coordinates: 12.097059°S 77.048951°W

Ambassador Extraordinary and Plenipotentiary of the People's Republic of China to the Republic of Peru
- 中华人民共和国驻秘鲁共和国特命全权大使 (Chinese)
- National emblem of China
- Ministry of Foreign Affairs of the People's Republic of China; Embassy of China, Lima
- Inaugural holder: Chen Lanbin
- Formation: 11 December 1875; 150 years ago
- Abolished: 1971 (ROC)

The ambassador extraordinary and plenipotentiary of the People's Republic of China to the Republic of Peru (Note: Chinese: 中华人民共和国驻秘鲁共和国特命全权大使; pinyin: Zhōnghuá rénmín gònghéguó zhù bìlǔ gònghéguó tèmìng quánquán dàshǐ; Spanish: Embajador Extraordinario y Plenipotenciario de la República Popular China ante la República del Perú) is the official representative of the People's Republic of China to the Republic of Peru. The ambassador in Lima, appointed by the Chairman of the Standing Committee of the National People's Congress (NPCSC), services the Embassy of the People's Republic of China in Peru.

== Background ==
China and Peru first established relations with the signing of a treaty in Tianjin on June 26, 1874. Peru's first resident ambassador was named the next year, assuming his duties on May 20, 1878, while the Chinese ambassador would only reach Peru in 1883, after the War of the Pacific. Relations between both states started with the Coolie Trade and matured during the 'Hundred Years weakness and poverty' (Wang, 1993) from the 1840s to 1949 of the impoverished Qing China, followed by a republic divided by civil wars and invaded by Japan.

After the establishment of the Republic of China, Peru maintained its relations with the new Kuomintang government. In 1944, the diplomatic status of the two countries was raised to embassy level, and high-level officials of the two countries exchanged frequent visits in the 1950s and 1960s. As a result of the Chinese Civil War, Peru closed its embassy in Beijing in 1946.

In 1971, under the military government of Juan Velasco Alvarado, Peru established relations with the People's Republic of China on November 2, 1971, with the Republic of China severing its relations and closing its embassy in Lima as a result, and the PRC opening its embassy the following year. As such, Peru became the third Latin American country to recognize the Beijing-based government.

In May 1978, the Republic of China (Taiwan) established a "Far East Trade Center" in Lima, renamed the Taipei Economic and Cultural Office in Peru on November 5, 1990, under an executive order approved by then president Alberto Fujimori.

== List of representatives ==
Name		Appointment	Arrival	Credentials	Removed	Resignation	Rank	Title	Head of state
1875: China and Peru formally establish relations; the ambassador in Washington, D.C. becomes accredited to Peru
Chen Lanbin	陈兰彬	December 11, 1875	—N/a	—N/a	June 24, 1881	—N/a	2M	IE	Guangxu
Cheng Tsao-Ju	郑藻如	June 24, 1881	July 1884	—N/a	July 26, 1885	—N/a	2M	IE	Guangxu
Zhang Yinhuan	張蔭桓	July 27, 1885	June 20, 1888	June 27, 1888	September 28, 1889	—N/a	2M	IE	Guangxu
Tsui Kwo Yin	崔國因	March 31, 1889	March 1, 1891	March 6, 1891	September 2, 1893	March 17, 1891	2M	IE	Guangxu
Yang Yü	楊儒	February 8, 1893	—N/a	—N/a	November 23, 1896	—N/a	2M	IE	Guangxu
Wu Ting-fang	伍廷芳	November 23, 1896	—N/a	—N/a	October 26, 1902	—N/a	2M	IE	Guangxu
Liang Cheng	梁誠	July 13, 1902	—N/a	—N/a	July 3, 1902	—N/a	2M	IE	Guangxu
Wu Ting-fang	伍廷芳	September 23, 1907	June 24, 1909	July 2, 1909	December 17, 1909	—N/a	2M	IE	Guangxu
Zhang Yintang	張蔭棠	August 12, 1909	—N/a	—N/a	—N/a	—N/a	2M	IE	Xuantong
Alfred Sao-ke Sze (Note: Unable to travel due to the Xinhai revolution.)	施肇基	October 25, 1911	—N/a	—N/a	—N/a	—N/a	2M	IE	Xuantong
1913: China and Peru formally reestablish relations on May 15
Liu Shih-hsun^{BR}	刘式训	December 31, 1913	—N/a	—N/a	—N/a	May 14, 1914	M	E	Yuan Shikai
Wu Chin-lin	吳振麟	December 26, 1913	May 11, 1914	—N/a	—N/a	—N/a	2S*	CdA	Yuan Shikai
Hsia Yi-Ting^{BR}	夏詒霆	February 11, 1918	February 11, 1921	March 5, 1921	January 1925	—N/a	M	E	Feng Guozhang
Lo Tsung-yee	羅忠詒	September 17, 1920	—N/a	—N/a	December 14, 1923	—N/a	1S*	CdA	Xu Shichang
Shih Yu-ming	史悠明	August 29, 1923	—N/a	—N/a	—N/a	July 1926	1S	CdA	Gao Lingwei
Shi Zhaoxiang	施肇祥	February 14, 1926	June 1926	—N/a	—N/a	January 6, 1929	M	E	Duan Qirui
Wang Teh-fen	王德棻	August 29, 1928	January 6, 1929	—N/a	March 5, 1929	—N/a	3S	CdA	Tan Yankai
Wei Tze-ching	魏子京	January 21, 1929	March 5, 1929	—N/a	September 6, 1930	—N/a	1S	CdA	Chiang Kai-shek
Wei Tze-ching	魏子京	September 6, 1930	September 6, 1930	—N/a	March 7, 1931	—N/a	A(a)	CdA	Chiang Kai-shek
Wei Tze-ching	魏子京	March 7, 1931	March 21, 1931	August 21, 1931	January 23, 1934	—N/a	M	E	Chiang Kai-shek
Li Jun	李骏	March 2, 1934	August 2, 1934	August 6, 1934	October 24, 1944	—N/a	M	E	Lin Sen
1944: Chinese legation upgraded to embassy on September 1
Li Jun	李骏	—N/a	September 1, 1944	—N/a	—N/a	December 20, 1944	M	CdA	Chiang Kai-shek
Pao Chun-chien^{BO}	保君建	October 24, 1944	December 20, 1944	December 22, 1944	February 20, 1956	—N/a	AEP		Chiang Kai-shek
Hsu Shu-hsi^{BO}	徐淑希	February 20, 1956	April 7, 1956	April 30, 1956	December 19, 1962	February 2, 1963	AEP		Chiang Kai-shek
Senba P.W. Seng^{BO}	孫邦華	April 20, 1963	June 16, 1963	June 25, 1963	March 18, 1967	May 30, 1967	AEP		Chiang Kai-shek
Liu Tsung-han	劉宗翰	March 18, 1967	June 5, 1967	June 10, 1967	—N/a	November 4, 1971	AEP		Chiang Kai-shek
1971: Commercial office opened by the China Council for the Promotion of International Trade in Peru
Wang Yanchang	王言昌	September 1971	—N/a	—N/a	—N/a	November 1971	Director		Mao Zedong
1971: China (PRC) and Peru formally establish relations on November 2
Wang Yanchang	王言昌	—N/a	November 1971	—N/a	—N/a	February 1972	C	CdA	Zhou Enlai
Jiao Ruoyu	焦若愚	December 15, 1971	February 1, 1972	February 9, 1972	—N/a	January 2, 1977	AEP		Zhou Enlai
Wang Ze	王泽	May 1977	May 6, 1977	May 25, 1977	—N/a	May 1981	AEP		Zhou Enlai
Xu Huang	徐晃	November 1981	—N/a	December 1981	—N/a	March 24, 1984 (Note: Died in office.)	AEP		Zhao Ziyang
Yang Mai	杨迈	October 1984	—N/a	October 23, 1984	—N/a	March 1988	AEP		Zhao Ziyang
Zhu Xiangzhong	朱祥忠	June 1988	June 3, 1988	June 21, 1988	—N/a	October 5, 1990	AEP		Li Peng
Dai Shiqi	戴诗琪	October 1990	—N/a	October 19, 1990	—N/a	August 1993	AEP		Li Peng
Chen Jiuchang	陈久长	September 1993	—N/a	September 13, 1993	—N/a	November 1996	AEP		Li Peng
Ren Jingyu	任景玉	November 1996	—N/a	December 1996	—N/a	October 2000	AEP		Li Peng
Mai Guoyan	麦国彦	October 2000	—N/a	October 30, 2000	—N/a	December 2004	AEP		Zhu Rongji
Yin Hengmin	殷恒民	December 2004	December 30, 2004	January 5, 2005	—N/a	February 2007	AEP		Wen Jiabao
Gao Zhengyue	高正月	February 2007	February 25, 2007	February 28, 2007	—N/a	July 2009	AEP		Wen Jiabao
Zhao Wuyi	赵五一	August 2009	August 5, 2009	August 7, 2009	—N/a	November 2011	AEP		Wen Jiabao
Huang Minhui	黄敏慧	November 2011	November 15, 2011	November 18, 2011	—N/a	June 2015	AEP		Wen Jiabao
Jia Guide	贾桂德	July 2015	July 21, 2015	August 20, 2015	—N/a	May 2019	AEP		Li Keqiang
Liang Yu	梁宇	November 2019	November 9, 2019	December 11, 2019	—N/a	July 2022	AEP		Li Keqiang
Song Yang	宋扬	August 2022	August 30, 2022	September 29, 2022	—N/a	—N/a	AEP		Li Keqiang

== See also ==
- List of ambassadors of Peru to China
- China–Peru relations
- Embassy of China, Lima
