= Wang Yanchang =

Chinese politician and diplomat (1926–2008)

Ambassador of China to Guyana Accredited to Trinidad and Tobago
- In office August 1979 – February 1983
- Preceded by: Wang Zhanyuan
- Succeeded by: Yang Mai

Personal details
- Born: February 6, 1926 Wendeng, Weihai, China
- Died: June 14, 2008 Beijing, China
- Party: Chinese Communist Party
- Education: Renmin University of China

Wang Yanchang (Chinese: 王言昌; pinyin: Wáng Yánchāng; 1926–2008) was a diplomat of the People's Republic of China. He represented his country as ambassador in Guyana (with concurrent accreditation to Trinidad and Tobago, and as diplomat in other countries, such as Peru, India and Denmark.

== Early life ==
Wang was born in Wendeng on February 6, 1926. An active adherent of the group in 1940, he joined the Chinese Communist Party in 1944. In 1947, he joined the Northeast Branch of Xinhua News Agency and, in 1954, he was transferred to the Department of Foreign Affairs of Renmin University of China to study. After graduating in 1958, he was transferred to the Ministry of Foreign Affairs and served in the Secretary Group of the Party Committee of the Ministry.

== Career ==
Starting in 1960, he served in the Consulate-General in Mumbai, the Party Committee of the Ministry of Foreign Affairs, the Political Department of the Ministry of Foreign Affairs, the Embassy in Denmark, and later served as the counselor of the Embassy in Denmark.

In 1971, China and Peru established commercial offices, with Wang serving as the director of the office in Lima. In the same year, China and Peru established diplomatic relations and he served as Political Counselor of the Embassy in Peru. The Chinese community in Lima, then closely identified with the Republic of China, was referenced in Wang's speech at a reception honouring the establishment of relations between both countries, where he hoped that his "pro-Kuomintang compatriots" would change their political posture and accept the People's Republic.

In 1977, he returned to China and served as deputy editor-in-chief of Guangming Daily. In August 1979, he served as the Ambassador to Guyana and to Trinidad and Tobago. In 1983, he served as deputy director of the Organization Department and deputy director of the Party Committee of the Ministry of Foreign Affairs. In 1984, he served as Assistant Minister of Foreign Affairs and Secretary of the Party Committee of the Ministry of Foreign Affairs. In 1987, he concurrently served as director of the Supervision Bureau of the Ministry of Supervision in the Ministry of Foreign Affairs. In December 1988, he served as Secretary of the Discipline Inspection Commission of the Ministry of Foreign Affairs and member of the Ministry's Party Committee, with the rank of deputy minister. In January 1993, he resigned as Secretary of the Discipline Inspection Commission of the Ministry of Foreign Affairs and a member of the Ministry's Party Committee. Retired in September 1998.

He served as a deputy to the 5th National People's Congress, a member of the 13th Central Commission for Discipline Inspection, and a member of the 8th National Committee of the Chinese People's Political Consultative Conference.

On June 14, 2008, Wang died of an illness in Beijing at the age of 82.

Political offices
| Preceded by Wang Zhanyuan | Ambassador of China to Guyana; Accredited to Trinidad and Tobago; August 1979–February 1983 | Succeeded by Yang Mai |
| Preceded by Position established | Head of the Trade Office of Council for Promotion of International Trade in Peru; September 1971–November 1971 | Succeeded by Himself (as chargé d'affaires) |
