= Liang Yu =

Liang Yu may refer to:

- Liang Yu (footballer), Chinese footballer
- Liang Yu (activist), women's rights advocate in China
- Liang Yu (diplomat), Chinese diplomat
- Yu Liang, Chinese Jin dynasty military general and politician
