= Song Yang =

Song Yang may refer to:

- Song Yang (badminton) (born 1965), Australian badminton player
- Song Yang (diplomat) (born 1967), Chinese diplomat
- Yang Song (born 1989), Chinese trampolinist
- Yang Song (Romance of the Three Kingdoms), a character in the 14th-century novel Romance of the Three Kingdoms
