= List of ambassadors of China to the United States =

Ambassador Extraordinary and Plenipotentiary of the People's Republic of China to the United States of America
- 中华人民共和国 驻美利坚合众国特命全权大使
- National emblem of China

- Flag of China

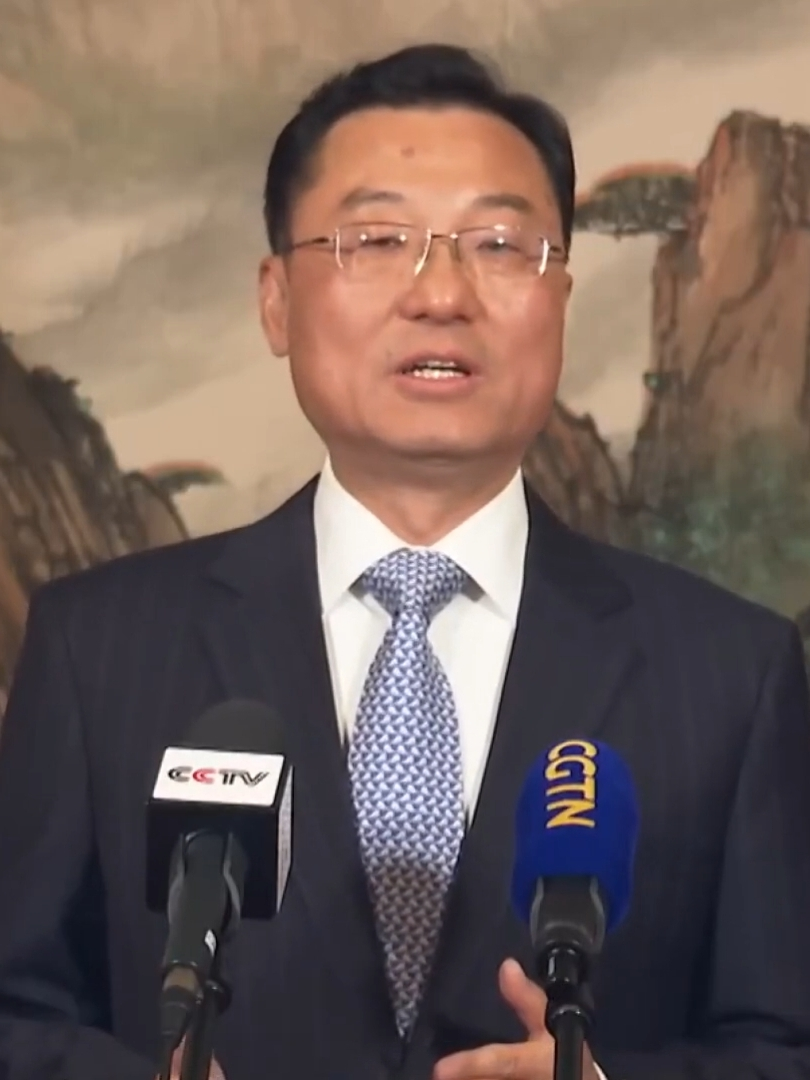
- Incumbent; Xie Feng since 23 May 2023
- Ministry of Foreign Affairs; Embassy of China, Washington, D.C.
- Appointer: The president; pursuant to a National People's Congress Standing Committee decision
- Inaugural holder: Chen Lanbin
- Formation: 11 December 1875; 150 years ago
- Website: us.china-embassy.gov.cn/eng/

The ambassador of China to the United States is the official representative of the People's Republic of China to the United States. The current ambassador is Xie Feng. The official full title of the office is the ambassador extraordinary and plenipotentiary of the People's Republic of China to the United States of America.

== List of representatives ==
This is a list of diplomatic representatives from China to the United States. It includes envoys of the Qing dynasty and the Republic of China from 1875 to 1978, and those of the People's Republic of China since 1973.

Official Full Title	Duration
Imperial Envoy of the Great Qing Country Sent to the United States of America	1875–1912
Envoy of the Republic of China in the United States of America	1912–1935
Ambassador Extraordinary and Plenipotentiary of the Republic of China to the United States of America	1928–1978
Representative of the Cooridination Council for North American Affairs	1979–1994
Representative of the Taipei Economic and Cultural Representative Office in the United States of America	1994–Incumbent
Director of the Liaison Office of the People's Republic of China to the United States of America	1973–1979
Ambassador Extraordinary and Plenipotentiary of the People's Republic of China to the United States of America	1979–Incumbent

=== Qing dynasty ===
Name	Chinese name	Took office	Left office	Monarch	Ref.
Chen Lanbin	陳蘭彬	11 December 1875	24 June 1881	Guangxu Emperor	
Zheng Zaoru	鄭藻如	24 June 1881	26 July 1885	Guangxu Emperor	
Zhang Yinheng	張蔭桓	27 July 1885	28 September 1889	Guangxu Emperor	
Tsui Kwo Yin	崔國因	31 March 1889	2 September 1893	Guangxu Emperor	
Yang Yü	楊儒	1893	23 November 1896	Guangxu Emperor	
Wu Ting-fang	伍廷芳	23 November 1896	12 July 1902	Guangxu Emperor	
Liang Cheng	梁誠	19 July 1902	3 July 1907	Guangxu Emperor	
Wu Ting-fang	伍廷芳	December 1907	12 August 1909	Guangxu Emperor	
Wu Ting-fang	伍廷芳	December 1907	12 August 1909	Xuantong Emperor	
Zhang Yintang	張蔭棠	12 August 1909	25 October 1911	Xuantong Emperor	

=== Provisional government ===
Name	Chinese name	Took office	Left office	President	Ref.
Alfred Sao-ke Sze	施肇基	—	10 October 1913	Sun Yat-sen	
Alfred Sao-ke Sze	施肇基	—	10 October 1913	Yuan Shikai	

=== Beiyang government ===
Name	Chinese name	Took office	Left office	President	Ref.
Kai Fu Shah	劉式訓	1913	1915	Yuan Shikai	
Wellington Koo	顧維鈞	25 October 1915	29 September 1920	Yuan Shikai	
Wellington Koo	顧維鈞	25 October 1915	29 September 1920	Li Yuanhong	
Wellington Koo	顧維鈞	25 October 1915	29 September 1920	Xu Shichang	
Alfred Sao-ke Sze	施肇基	1920	1928	Xu Shichang	
Alfred Sao-ke Sze	施肇基	1920	1928	Cao Kun	
Alfred Sao-ke Sze	施肇基	1920	1928	Duan Qirui	
Alfred Sao-ke Sze	施肇基	1920	1928	Zhang Zuolin	

=== Nationalist government ===
Name	Chinese name	Took office	Left office	Chairman	Ref.
Wu Chaoshu	伍朝樞	1928	1931	Tan Yankai	
Wu Chaoshu	伍朝樞	1928	1931	Chiang Kai-shek	
Yan Huiqing	顏惠慶	1931	1933	Chiang Kai-shek	
Yan Huiqing	顏惠慶	1931	1933	Lin Sen	
Alfred Sao-ke Sze	施肇基	1933	1936	Lin Sen	
Chengting T. Wang	王正廷	1936	1938	Lin Sen	
Hu Shih	胡適	29 October 1938	1 September 1942	Lin Sen	
Wei Tao-ming	魏道明	1942	1946	Lin Sen	
Wellington Koo	顧維鈞	27 June 1946	—	Chiang Kai-shek	

=== Government of the Republic of China after the 1947 constitution ===
Name	Chinese name	Took office	Left office	President	Ref.
Wellington Koo	顧維鈞	—	21 March 1956	Chiang Kai-shek	
Hollington Tong	董顯光	1956	1958	Chiang Kai-shek	
George Yeh	葉公超	August 1958	November 1961	Chiang Kai-shek	
Tsiang Tingfu	蔣廷黻	18 November 1961	29 May 1965	Chiang Kai-shek	
Chow Shu-kai	周書楷	1965	1971	Chiang Kai-shek	
James Shen	沈劍虹	9 April 1971	31 December 1978	Chiang Kai-shek	
James Shen	沈劍虹	9 April 1971	31 December 1978	Yen Chia-kan	
James Shen	沈劍虹	9 April 1971	31 December 1978	Chiang Ching-kuo	

Due to the Republic of China’s expulsion from the United Nations in 1971 and the United States’ recognition of the Peoples’ Republic of China, see the list of representatives of the Taipei Economic and Cultural Representative Office in the United States for representatives after 1979.

=== Liaison Office of the People's Republic of China ===
The official full title of the post was the Director of the Liaison Office of the People's Republic of China in the United States of America (中华人民共和国驻美利坚合众国联络处主任).

No.	Name	Chinese name	Took office	Left office	Ref.
1	Huang Zhen	黄镇	30 May 1973	18 November 1977	
2	Chai Zemin	柴泽民	9 August 1978	23 February 1979	

=== People's Republic of China ===
The official full title of the post is the Ambassador Extraordinary and Plenipotentiary of the People's Republic of China to the United States of America (中华人民共和国驻美利坚合众国特命全权大使).

No.	Name	Chinese name	Took office	Left office	Appointer	Ref.
1	Chai Zemin	柴泽民	23 February 1979	27 December 1982	N/A	
2	Zhang Wenjin	章文晋	4 March 1983	10 April 1985	N/A	
3	Han Xu	韩叙	3 May 1985	18 August 1989	Li Xiannian	
4	Zhu Qizhen	朱启祯	20 October 1989	30 March 1993	Yang Shangkun	
5	Li Daoyu	李道豫	8 April 1993	February 1998	Jiang Zemin	
6	Li Zhaoxing	李肇星	11 March 1998	30 January 2001	Jiang Zemin	
7	Yang Jiechi	杨洁篪	18 February 2001	6 March 2005	Jiang Zemin	
8	Zhou Wenzhong	周文重	3 April 2005	1 March 2010	Hu Jintao	
9	Zhang Yesui	张业遂	14 March 2010	24 February 2013	Hu Jintao	
10	Cui Tiankai	崔天凯	2 April 2013	23 June 2021	Xi Jinping	
11	Qin Gang	秦刚	28 July 2021	5 January 2023	Xi Jinping	
12	Xie Feng	谢锋	23 May 2023	present	Xi Jinping	
