= Pao Chun-chien =

Chinese diplomat (1896–1970)

- Born: 1896; Nantong, Jiangsu, Qing China
- Died: 18 March 1970 (aged 73–74); London, United Kingdom

Pao Chun-chien (Chinese: 保君建; pinyin: Bǎo Jūnjiàn; 1896 – 18 March 1970), courtesy name Jixing (Chinese: 既星), was a diplomat of the Republic of China.

== Career ==
Born in Nantong, he represented his country as a consul-general in Sydney and Calcutta, and as ambassador to Peru and Bolivia, Jordan, Saudi Arabia and Turkey.

He died in London on 18 March 1970 while holding the office of ambassador to Turkey, having been sent there from Turkey for medical treatment. He was buried in Lima, Peru on 23 March 1970.

Political offices
Preceded by Yuan Tse-kien	Ambassador of China to Turkey; April 1967–March 1970	Succeeded by Ni Yue-si
Preceded by Ma Bufang	Ambassador of China to Saudi Arabia; September 1961–June 1966	Succeeded by Li Qin
Preceded by Chih-Ping Chen	Ambassador of China to Jordan; October 1959–April 1967	Succeeded by Chen Jia-shang
Preceded by Position established	Ambassador of China to Bolivia; January 1948–July 1956	Succeeded by Hsu Shu-hsi
Preceded by Li Jun	Ambassador of China to Peru; October 24, 1944–1956	Succeeded by Hsu Shu-hsi
