= Huang Minhui (diplomat) =

Chinese diplomat

Chinese Ambassador to Peru
- In office December 20, 2011 – June 2015
- Appointed by: President Hu Jintao
- Preceded by: Zhao Wuyi
- Succeeded by: Jia Guide

Personal details
- Spouse: Li Jinzhang
- Children: 1

Huang Minhui (Chinese: 黃敏慧; pinyin: Huáng Mǐnhuì) is a diplomat of the People's Republic of China. She served as the Chinese Ambassador to Peru from 2011 to 2015. She was the first female ambassador that China sent to South America.

== Career ==
Huang's career in Latin America dates back to the 1970s, having been a first-hand witness to important periods in the region's history, such as the reforms imposed by the government of Augusto Pinochet in Chile, the 1990 general election in Nicaragua, the transition in Cuba to a post-Soviet era, among others. She also served as an observer in the Organization of American States. She speaks Spanish fluently and was a translator for state and party leaders, including President Li Xiannian, President Yang Shangkun, Premier Zhao Ziyang, General Secretary Hu Yaobang, First Vice Premier Wan Li, and Chairman Deng Xiaoping.

On December 20, 2011, Chinese President Hu Jintao appointed her to replace Zhao Wuyi as the 13th Chinese Ambassador to Peru. She arrived in Peru in 2012. Her work in Peru included supporting joint efforts on economic, trade and cultural issues. During her tenure, she visited Caral, an archaeological site that contains what is considered to be the oldest city in the Americas. She also assisted in the 2014 Goldman Environmental Prize ceremony honoring Peruvian indigenous leader Ruth Buendía.

She retired from her diplomatic career after her tenure as ambassador to Peru came to an end in June 2015. Before her retirement, she wrote an article, "Writing a New Chapter in China-Peru Friendship", that was published in the People's Daily on May 22, 2015.

== Personal life ==
Huang's husband, Li Jinzhang, was the Chinese Ambassador to Brazil for seven years. They have a daughter.

Preceded by Zhao Wuyi	Chinese Ambassador to Peru; November 2011–June 2005	Succeeded by Jia Guide
