= Xu Huang (diplomat) =

Chinese diplomat (1915–1984)

Ambassador of China to Peru
- In office November 1981 – March 24, 1984 †
- Preceded by: Wang Ze
- Succeeded by: Yang Mai

Ambassador of China to Laos
- In office December 1977 – June 1981
- Preceded by: Guo Ying
- Succeeded by: Zhang Zhiguo

Personal details
- Born: 1915; Tai'an, China
- Died: March 24, 1984; Lima, Peru
- Political party: Chinese Communist Party

Xu Huang (Chinese: 徐晃; pinyin: Xú Huǎng; 1915–1984) was a Chinese diplomat. He represented his country as ambassador twice: first to Laos (1977–1981) and second to Peru (1981–1984), where he died in office.

== Biography ==
In 1935, he participated in the Chinese National Armed Self-Defense Association, and, on the same year, he joined the Chinese Communist Party (CCP) in August. After the outbreak of the December 9th Movement, he participated in the petition march. After returning to school, he carried out anti-Japanese propaganda and organized the student union, being elected as the chairman. On December 16, 1935, he led 300 teachers and students to participate in the demonstration.

In the summer of 1936, he was admitted to Peking University and participated in activities of the Chinese National Liberation Vanguard. After the Marco Polo Bridge incident, he returned to Taicheng to participate in the work of the County Anti-Enemy Support Association. In October 1937, he went to Changsha Temporary University to resume his studies, joined the army service group in the south of Hu Zongnan, and worked inside the National Revolutionary Army. After traveling to Shaanxi and Sichuan, he resumed his studies at National Southwestern Associated University in Kunming, where he served as president of the group club and chairman of the student union of Southwest Associated University. Later, he went to teach in Chenggong County, where he developed party members and established local organizations. In June 1941, he went to Mile County from Chenggong to establish a local organization and served as secretary of the county's party committee. He entered Sichuan from Yunnan in 1942. In 1943, he worked in the Chongqing Office of the Eighth Route Army, travelling in July 1943 to Yan'an to participate in the rectification movement. In August 1944, he was transferred to the Central Social Affairs Department of the CCP Central Committee.

From October 1945, where he went to work in the Northeast region and served as Secretary and Director of the Social Department of the Rehe Provincial Committee, to 1954, he served in a series of political posts, mainly in various municipalities and related to the CCP. In 1954, he was transferred to the Ministry of Foreign Affairs and served as deputy director of the Intelligence Department (later renamed the Information Department). From 1960 to 1961, he served as counselor at the Embassy in the German Democratic Republic. After returning to China, he served as deputy director and director of the Consular Department. In 1970, he was appointed Director of the Diplomatic Service. In 1977, he was appointed ambassador to Laos.

Starting in November 1981, he was appointed ambassador to Peru. On March 24, 1984, Xu died of illness in Lima, when he was 69 years old. After his death, Peruvian President Fernando Belaúnde, First and Second Vice Presidents, Fernando Schwalb and Javier Alva Orlandini, went to the Chinese Embassy to express their condolences, and wreaths were sent by fellow party members Peng Zhen, Ulanhu, Qiao Shi, Wang Shoudao, Rong Yiren, Liao Hansheng and Huang Hua. A memorial meeting presided by then Foreign Minister Wu Xueqian was attended by figures such as Ji Pengfei and Yao Guang.
