= Hsia Yi-Ting =

Chinese diplomat (1878–1944)

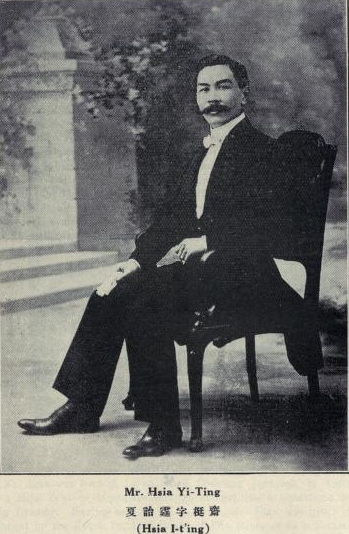
- Born: 1878; Jiangyin, China
- Died: 1944

Hsia Yi-Ting (Chinese: 夏詒霆; pinyin: Xià Yítíng; 1878–1944), was a diplomat of the Republic of China.

== Biography ==
In his early years, he was awarded a tribute student from the Qing Dynasty. Later, he served as translator at the Qing legation in Berlin. After that, he served successively as a member of the Qing Dynasty's Legation in Spain and the First Secretary of the Legation in Paris. In 1912, he served as secretary of the Ministry of Foreign Affairs of the Beiyang government. In February of the following year, he was transferred to Secretary of the State Council. In August of the same year, he went to Japan to serve as the Acting Consul General in Yokohama for one month. Afterwards, he served as diplomatic consul in Belgium and France. In March 1915, he served as counselor of the Ministry of Foreign Affairs.

In March 1916, seeing that the monarchy could no longer be maintained, Yuan Shikai promoted the establishment of the Political Research Association to review the new political system. Xia Yiting became the secretary-general of the Research Association. In April, Xia Yiting became acting deputy minister of foreign affairs. In October, he temporarily acted as the foreign minister of Duan Qirui's cabinet, and later served as advisor to the president and advisor to the State Council. In February 1918, he was appointed as China's Minister to Brazil and Peru. In January 1920, he won the second-class Medal of the Order of the Beiyang Government. In October 1922, he won the first-class Order of the Precious Brilliant Golden Grain with a large ribbon. In 1927, his term ended and he returned to the country.

After that, Xia Yiting moved to Nanjing. In 1936, he returned to Jiangyin, but soon fled to Shanghai due to the outbreak of the Second Sino-Japanese War. He died of illness in Shanghai in 1944, at the age of 66.

== Bibliography ==
- 徐, 友春 (2007). 民国人物大辞典 増訂版. 河北人民出版社 [A Dictionary of Figures of the Republic of China, Extended Edition] (in Chinese). 河北人民出版社 [Hebei People's Publishing House]. ISBN 978-7-202-03014-1.
- 劉, 寿林 (1995). 民国職官年表 [Chronology of official positions in the Republic of China] (in Chinese). 中華書局 [Zhonghua Book Company]. ISBN 7-101-01320-1.
- Who's Who in China (3rd ed.). Shanghai: The China Weekly Review. 1925.
- Who's Who in China (5th ed.). Shanghai: The China Weekly Review. 1936.

Political offices
Preceded by Wu Chin-lin	Chinese Ambassador to Brazil and Peru; 1918–1925	Succeeded by Lo Tsung-yee
