= Ren Jingyu =

Chinese diplomat

Ren Jingyu (Chinese: 任景玉; pinyin: Rén Jǐngyù) is a diplomat of the People's Republic of China.

== Career ==
In 1996, he succeeded Chen Jiuchang as the Ambassador of the People's Republic of China to Peru. In 2000, he was succeeded by Mai Guoyan, and was reassigned as the Ambassador of the People's Republic of China to Chile. In 2003, he succeeded Li Jinzhang as the Ambassador of the People's Republic of China to Mexico.

Preceded by Chen Jiuchang	Chinese Ambassador to Peru; November 1996–October 2000	Succeeded by Mai Guoyan
Preceded by Zhang Shaying	Chinese Ambassador to Chile; December 2000–August 2003	Succeeded by Li Changhua
Preceded by Li Jinzhang	Chinese Ambassador to Mexico; September 2003–February 2007	Succeeded by Yin Hengmin
