= Yin Hengmin =

Chinese politician

- Born: March 1957; Wujiang, Suzhou
- Education: Beijing Foreign Studies University
- Political party: Chinese Communist Party

Yin Hengmin (Chinese: 殷恆民; pinyin: Yīn Héngmín; born 1957) is a politician and diplomat of the People's Republic of China.

== Career ==
In 2004, he succeeded Mai Guoyan as the Ambassador of the People's Republic of China to Peru. In 2007, he succeeded Ren Jingyu as the Ambassador of the People's Republic of China to Mexico. In 2011, he succeeded Zeng Gang as the Ambassador of the People's Republic of China to Argentina. He retired in October 2014. Since 2015, he has served as the Chinese government’s special representative for Latin American affairs.

== Awards ==
- Order of the Aztec Eagle (Mexico)
- Order of May (Argentina)

Preceded by -	Special Representative for Latin American Affairs; 2015–2018	Succeeded by Liu Yuqin
Diplomatic posts
Preceded by Zeng Gang	Chinese Ambassador to Argentina; January 2011–September 2014	Succeeded by Yang Wanming
Preceded by Ren Jingyu	Chinese Ambassador to Mexico; February 2007–December 2010	Succeeded by Zeng Gang
Preceded by Mai Guoyan	Chinese Ambassador to Peru; December 2004–February 2007	Succeeded by Gao Zhengyue
