= Li Jinzhang =

Chinese diplomat (born 1954)

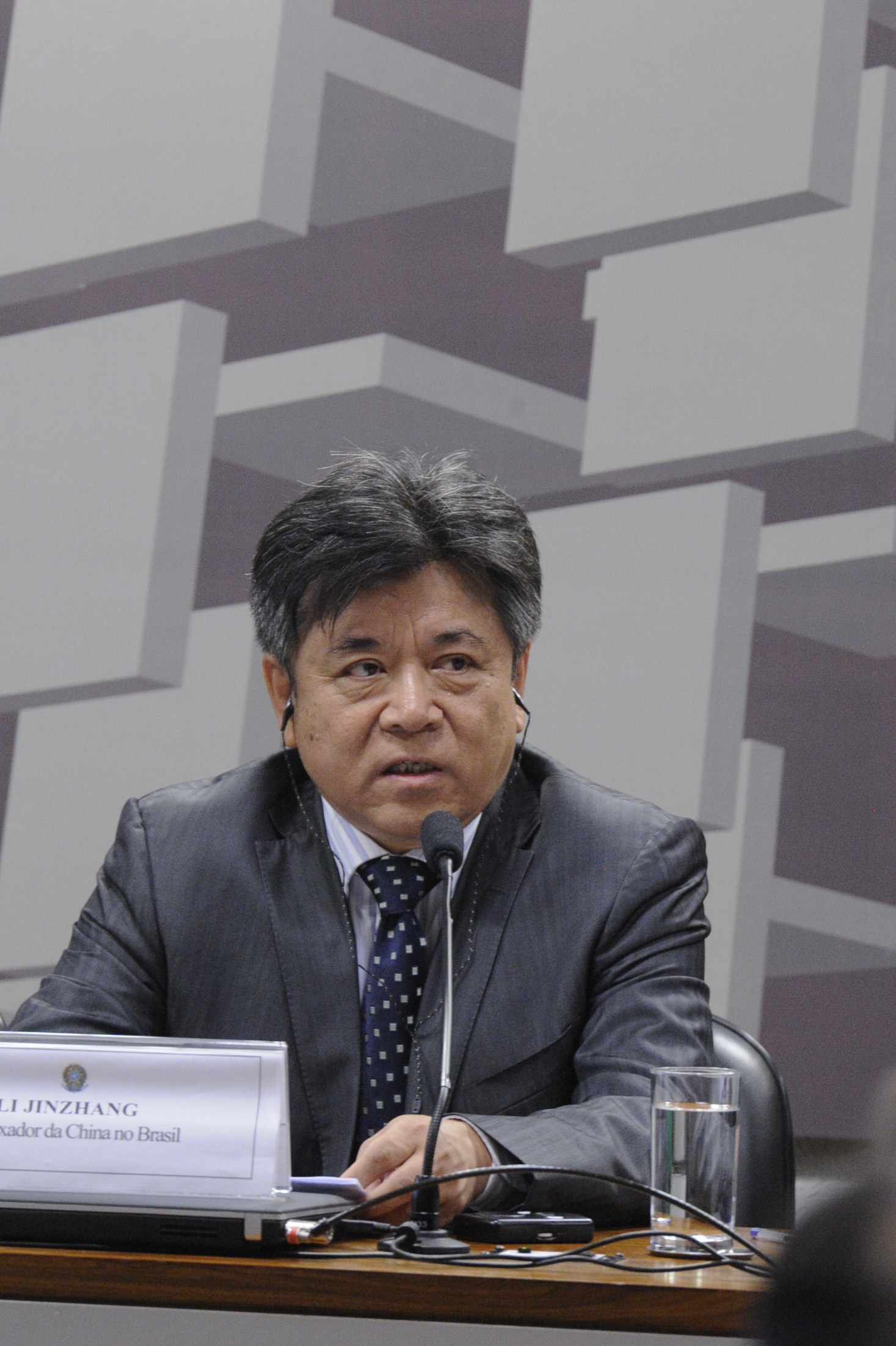

Chinese Ambassador to Brazil
- In office January 2012 – December 2018
- Preceded by: Qiu Xiaoqi
- Succeeded by: Yang Wanming

Chinese Ambassador to Mexico
- In office March 2001 – December 2018
- Preceded by: Shen Yun'ao
- Succeeded by: Ren Jingyu

Personal details
- Born: November 12, 1954; Huanghua, Cangzhou, China
- Spouse: Huang Minhui
- Children: 1

Li Jinzhang (Chinese: 李金章; pinyin: Lǐ Jīnzhāng) is a diplomat of the People's Republic of China. He was ambassador to Mexico from 2001 to 2003, and ambassador to Brazil from 2012 to 2018.

== Biography ==
He graduated from Beijing Foreign Studies University (BFSU) in 1972 and then joined the Ministry of Foreign Affairs and, in the same year, was sent to study at the University of Havana in Cuba.

After graduating, he worked as an employee at the Chinese embassy in Havana. In 1980 he returned to China and served as third secretary and deputy director of the Department of the Americas and Oceania of the Ministry of Foreign Affairs. In 1988 he was appointed First Secretary of the Embassy in Nicaragua. In 1990 he was transferred to the role of Counselor at the embassy in Cuba and three years later he returned once again to study at BFSU. In 1998 he was promoted to Director of the Latin American Department of the Ministry of Foreign Affairs and from 2001 he began his career as an ambassador, serving in Mexico.

In 2003 he returned to China and served as Deputy Minister. In 2006 he was promoted to Vice Minister of Foreign Affairs. In January 2012 he served as Ambassador to Brazil.

In December 2018 he resigned from his duties and officially retired, with his retirement ceremony in the embassy being attended by the Brazilian minister of Foreign Affairs, Nunes Marques. That year Li was awarded "the country's highest diplomatic medal", the Grand Cross Medal of the Order of the Southern Cross.

== Personal life ==
Li's wife, Huang Minhui, was the Chinese Ambassador to Peru from 2011 to 2015.
