= Han Xu (diplomat) =

Chinese diplomat

- 韓敘
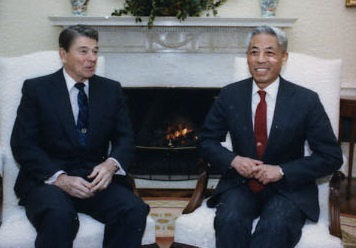
- Han Xu (right) with US President Ronald Reagan in the Oval Office (14 December 1988)

Chinese Ambassador to the United States
- In office 3 May 1985 – 18 August 1989
- Preceded by: Zhang Wenjin
- Succeeded by: Zhu Qizhen

Vice Minister of Foreign Affairs
- In office 1982–1985
- Minister: Wu Xueqian

Chinese Deputy Chief Liaison to the United States
- In office 1973–1979

Personal details
- Born: Shen Chongjian; May 26, 1924 Jiangning, Jiangsu, China
- Died: July 19, 1994 (aged 70) Beijing, China
- Party: Chinese Communist Party
- Spouse: Ge Jiyun
- Parent: Shen Jiayi
- Education: Yenching University
- Occupation: Diplomat

Chinese name
- Traditional Chinese: 韓敘
- Simplified Chinese: 韩叙
Transcriptions
Standard Mandarin
- Hanyu Pinyin: Hán Xù
- Wade–Giles: Han Hsü

Han Xu (May 26, 1924 – July 19, 1994) was a Chinese diplomat who served as the Chinese Ambassador to the United States from 1985 to 1989, and as Vice Foreign Minister of China from 1982 to 1985.

== Early life ==
Han was born May 26, 1924, in Jiangning County, Jiangsu Province. His original name was Shen Chongjian (沈崇健), and Hanxu was his courtesy name, which he later adopted as his full name.

His father, Shen Jiayi (沈家彝), served as a grand justice during the rule of the Chinese Nationalist Government. Because of his father's position in the government, Han received an elite education. In the 1940s, he studied at Yenching University in Beijing where he met Chinese Communist Party (CCP) leaders including the future Premier Zhou Enlai. Following his graduation from Yenching, Han worked as an English professor at the North China Allied University for several years where he met his wife, Ge Jiyun.

During the Second Sino-Japanese War, Han joined the CCP forces as a guerrilla fighter. His unit helped to rescue American pilots who were shot down by the Japanese over the mountainous areas of northern China. He kept bank notes signed by the pilots he helped save as souvenirs. Han's elder brother, Shen Chonghui (沈崇誨), had joined the Republic of China Air Force as a pilot and died in 1937 while bombing the Japanese cruiser Izumo during the Battle of Shanghai.

After the surrender of Japan in 1945, Han served as an interpreter for the peace talks between the CCP and the Nationalists, which were brokered by the United States.

== Career ==
In the wake of the CCP victory over the Nationalists in the Chinese Civil War, Han joined the Ministry of Foreign Affairs where he took the position of Director of the Protocol Department, a position he would occupy from 1949 until 1963. From 1963 until 1965, Han served as the first secretary of the Chinese Embassy in Moscow. As Director of Protocol, Han assisted in US President Richard Nixon's historic 1972 visit to China. According to the US Secretary of State Henry Kissinger, Han was the first person to greet him when he visited China in 1971.

In 1973, Han was promoted to the first deputy chief of the Chinese Liaison Office in Washington, D.C. In the six years Han served the post, he became popular among many in Washington for his sociable attitude and fluency in English.

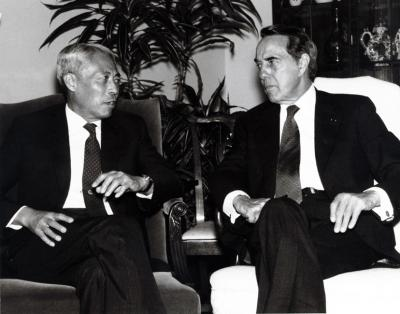
Han Xu (left) with US Senator Bob Dole in 1989

Following his role as deputy chief of the Liaison Office, Han became Vice Minister of Foreign Affairs in 1982. As Vice Minister, Han worked with United States on resolving the Taiwan issue. Over a series of trips and negotiations between then Vice President George H. W. Bush, the two parties came to sign the Third Communiqué that would work to decrease the sale of arms to Taiwan by the United States.

In 1985, Han returned to Washington to become the third Chinese ambassador to the United States. In the aftermath 1989 Tiananmen Square protests and massacre, the Chinese government and the Chinese Embassy in the United States found themselves flooded with demands for a response. On June 24, 1989, nearly three weeks after the conclusion of the events in Beijing, Han penned an article in The New York Times. It overwhelmingly supported the government action, while also acknowledging the "unfortunate loss of life" that had occurred: "There was, I regret to say, loss of life on both sides. I wonder whether any other government confronting such an unprecedented challenge would have handled the situation any better than mine did."

== Later life ==
After leaving his position as ambassador in 1989, Han was made chairman of the Chinese People's Association for Friendship with Foreign Countries. As chair, he continued to meet with current and former U.S. officials such as former president Richard Nixon.

On July 19, 1994, Han died of cancer in his Beijing home. When Henry Kissinger learned of his death, he remarked that Han "did many extraordinary things to further Chinese-American relations."

Diplomatic posts
Preceded by Zhang Wenjin	Chinese Ambassador to the United States; 1985–1989	Succeeded by Zhu Qizhen
