= Liang Yu (diplomat) =

Chinese diplomat

Liang Yu (Chinese: 梁宇; pinyin: Liáng Yǔ) is a diplomat of the People's Republic of China.

== Career ==
In 1990, he entered the Ministry of Foreign Affairs of the People's Republic of China and served in the Latin American Department of the Ministry of Foreign Affairs and the Embassy in Cuba. In 2006, he served as Counselor of the Embassy in Peru. In 2009, he served as counselor of the Latin American and Caribbean Department of the Ministry of Foreign Affairs. In 2010, he served as deputy director of the Foreign Affairs Bureau of the General Office of the National Committee of the Chinese People's Political Consultative Conference. In 2012, he served as Chief Deputy Observer and Minister Counselor of the Permanent Observer Office of the Organization of American States. In July 2017, he served as Ambassador to Bolivia. From November 2019 to July 2022, he served as Chinese Ambassador to Peru.

Preceded by Jia Guide	Chinese Ambassador to Peru; November 2019–July 2022	Succeeded by Song Yang
Preceded by Wu Yuanshan	Chinese Ambassador to Bolivia; July 2017–October 2019	Succeeded by Huang Yazhong
