= Li Jun (diplomat) =

Chinese diplomat (1892–1948)

- Born: 1892; Meixian, Meizhou, China
- Died: May 23, 1948
- Education: University of Liverpool
- Political party: Kuomintang

Li Jun (Chinese: 李骏; pinyin: Lǐ Jùn; 1892–1948), also written Li Chun, courtesy name Hsien-chang (Chinese: 显章) was a diplomat of the Republic of China and a member of the Kuomintang.

== Biography ==
In his early years, Li Jun studied at the National University in Shanghai, Nanyang College, and Beijing Taxation School. Later he went to study in the United Kingdom and France and received a master's degree from the University of Liverpool. Later, he successively served as the Deputy Consul of the Republic of China in Paris, Second Secretary of the Embassy in France, Consul-General in Singapore, Consul-General in Canada, and Consul-General in Paris.

From 1934 to 1944, he served as the Minister Plenipotentiary of the Republic of China in Peru. After returning to China, he served as Director-General of the Protocol Department of the Ministry of Foreign Affairs. The following year, he was appointed as the Minister Plenipotentiary of the Republic of China in Denmark. He died in office in 1948.

Political offices
| Preceded by Wei Tze-ching | Ambassador of China to Peru; March 2, 1934–December 20, 1944 | Succeeded by Pao Chun-chien |
| Preceded by ? | Minister of China to Denmark; 1945–May 28, 1948 | Succeeded by ? |
