= Mai Guoyan =

Chinese diplomat

Mai Guoyan (Chinese: 麥國彥; pinyin: Mài Guóyàn) is a diplomat of the People's Republic of China.

== Biography ==
Mai was born in Zhongshan. He is married to Chen Hongdi, who uses the Spanish name María. A career diplomat, he served as Chinese Ambassador to Peru from 2000 to 2004. During his tenure, he befriended Peruvian diplomat Luis Chang Reyes, who also has roots in Zhongshan.

Preceded by Ren Jingyu	Chinese Ambassador to Peru; October 2000–December 2004	Succeeded by Yin Hengmin
