= Zhu Qizhen (diplomat) =

Chinese diplomat and politician

- 朱启祯

Chinese Ambassador to the United States
- In office 1989–1993
- Preceded by: Han Xu
- Succeeded by: Li Daoyu

Personal details
- Born: 19 December 1927 Yixing, Jiangsu, Republic of China
- Died: 23 April 2014 (aged 86) Beijing, People's Republic of China
- Party: Chinese Communist Party
- Education: St. John's University, Shanghai
- Occupation: Diplomat

Zhu Qizhen (Chinese: 朱启祯; 19 December 1927 – 23 April 2014) was a Chinese diplomat and politician. He served as Vice Minister of Foreign Affairs from August 1984 to October 1989, and the Chinese Ambassador to the United States from 1989 to 1993.

== Career ==
Zhu Qizhen was born in Yixing, Jiangsu province. He graduated from St. John's University, Shanghai in 1948 and joined the Ministry of Foreign Affairs of the newly established People's Republic of China in November 1949. He served at the Chinese embassy in Egypt from 1972 to 1973, and as charge d'affaires at the Chinese embassy in Canberra, Australia from 1973 until 1977, when he was appointed director of the America and Oceania Division, in the Ministry of Foreign Affairs in Beijing. In 1979 Zhu accompanied Deng Xiaoping in the Chinese leader's historic visit to the United States.

In 1985 Zhu was appointed Vice Minister of Foreign Affairs, and from 1989 to 1993 was China's Ambassador to the United States. After returning from the United States he became a member of the standing committee and deputy director of the Foreign Affairs Committee of the 8th National People's Congress.

Zhu retired in 1998. He died in Beijing on 23 April 2014, aged 87.
