= List of ambassadors of Peru to China =

Coordinates: 39.945449°N 116.451321°E

Ambassador of Peru to the People's Republic of China
- Great Seal of Peru
- Ministry of Foreign Affairs; Sanlitun Bangong Lou 1-91, Beijing
- Appointer: The president of Peru
- Inaugural holder: Juan Federico Elmore
- Formation: 1875
- Website: Embassy of Peru in the People's Republic of China

The extraordinary and plenipotentiary ambassador of Peru in the People's Republic of China is the official representative of the Republic of Peru to the Government of the People's Republic of China.

The ambassador to China was also accredited to Japan until 1971, when Peru recognized the PRC, and the Democratic People's Republic of Korea from the establishment of relations in 1988 until 2017, when Peru declared the Korean ambassador as a persona non grata and gave him 5 days to leave the country in response to the country's missile launches earlier that month.

Peru established relations with the Chinese Empire with the signing of a treaty in Tianjin on June 26, 1874. Peru's first Resident Ambassador was named the next year, assuming his duties on May 20, 1878, while the Chinese ambassador would only reach Peru in 1883, after the War of the Pacific.

After the establishment of the Republic of China, Peru maintained its relations with the new Kuomintang government. In 1944, the diplomatic status of the two countries was raised to embassy level, and high-level officials of the two countries exchanged frequent visits in the 1950s and 1960s.

After the establishment of Juan Velasco Alvarado's Revolutionary Government, Peru established relations with the People's Republic of China on November 2, 1971, with the Republic of China severing its relations and closing its embassy in Lima as a result, and the PRC opening its embassy the following year. As such, Peru became the third Latin American country to recognize the Beijing-based government, and has since adhered to the One China policy.

== List of representatives ==
Name	Portrait	Title	Term begin	Term end	President	Notes
1874: China and Peru formally establish relations
Juan Federico Elmore		CdA	May 20, 1878	before 1881	Manuel Pardo	In 1874, Elmore, the Peruvian minister to China and Japan, left for Lake Manzala. Dr. Elmore intended to establish the Peruvian Mission in Japan, after which he would return to Beijing to ratify the treaty with China.
1912: Republic of China formally established
Manuel de Freyre y Santander		MP	1919	1919	Augusto B. Leguía	As Minister Plenipotentiary to Japan and China
Manuel Elías Bonnemaison		MP	August 9, 1929	October 1936	Augusto B. Leguía	(1865–1961)
Ricardo Rivera Schreiber		MP	1936	1941	Óscar R. Benavides	
1944: Relations elevated to embassy level
Santiago F. Bedoya Monjoy		AEP	September 1, 1944	July 28, 1945	Manuel Prado y Ugarteche	First ambassador to China.
Carlos Nicholson Jefferson		AEP	July 28, 1945	October 29, 1948	José Luis Bustamante y Rivero	Nicholson Jefferson, Mr. Carlos Born in Arequipa about 1890 of British parents. ... Appointed ambassador to China in January 1946.
Juan José Sala		CdA	1949		José Luis Bustamante y Rivero	As Chargé d'affaires (a.i.) after the closure of the embassy of Peru due to the Chinese Civil War.
Aníbal Ponce Sobrevilla		AEP	January 6, 1961	March 11, 1965	Manuel Prado y Ugarteche	Although Peru did not have any representative in Taipei for a period about ten years, the recent appointment of His Excellency Anibal Ponce Sobrevilla the Peruvian Ambassador to China has further strengthened the friendly relations between Peru and China.
José Luis De Cossio y Ruiz De Somocurcio		CdA	December 11, 1962		Ricardo Pío Pérez Godoy	General Chen Chia-shang, commander-in-chief of the Chinese Air Force, Admiral Ni Yue - Yes, Commander-in-Chief of the Chinese Navy, and four other Chinese military leaders in recognition of their contributions to the promotion of friendly relations between the two countries.
José Carlos Ferreyros Balta			July 18, 1966	1969	Nicolás Lindley López	Sent to attend the inauguration of Chiang Kai-shek on May 20. He arrived on the 18th.
Jorge Pérez Garreaud		CdA		November 3, 1971	Juan Velasco Alvarado	Final representative to the Republic of China.
1971: Relations between the People's Republic of China (PRC) and Peru formally established; Republic of China (ROC) represented by a Commercial Economic Counselor since 1994
Eduardo Valdez Pérez del Castillo		AEP	November 2, 1971	1975	Juan Velasco Alvarado	
César Espejo Romero		AEP	March 21, 1975	1977	Francisco Morales Bermúdez	
Alfredo Ramos Suero		AEP	March 9, 1977	1980	Francisco Morales Bermúdez	
Juan Alayza Rospigliosi		AEP	January 1, 1981	December 30, 1985	Fernando Belaúnde Terry	
Roberto Villarán Koechlin		AEP	December 30, 1985	before 1990	Alan García	Villarán became ambassador in Santiago de Chile on October 16, 1990
Gabriel Ignacio García Pike		AEP	August 1, 1993	June 7, 1994	Alberto Fujimori	
Jorge César Gordillo Barreto		AEP	June 7, 1994		Alberto Fujimori	
Martha Toledo-Ocampo Ureña		AEP	?	2002?		
Luis Chang Reyes		AEP	December 17, 2002	July 28, 2006	Alejandro Toledo	
Jesús Wu		AEP	March 21, 2007	June 25, 2009	Alan García	Also accredited to Pakistan and North Korea.
Harold Forsyth		AEP	June 16, 2009	August 3, 2011	Alan García	
Gonzalo Gutiérrez Reinel		AEP	November 1, 2011	June 23, 2014	Ollanta Humala	Named as concurrent ambassador to North Korea on March 11, 2012.
Juan Carlos Capuñay Chávez		AEP	August 27, 2014	September 11, 2017	Ollanta Humala	Previously destined to the embassy in Peking in the periods between 1972 and 1976 and 1991–94. Also accredited to the Democratic People's Republic of Korea.
Luis Felipe Quesada Incháustegui		AEP	December 13, 2017	September 27, 2022	Pedro Pablo Kuczynski	Also accredited to Mongolia and Pakistan. Retired in 2022.
Marco Vinicio Balarezo Lizarzaburu		AEP	December 25, 2022	October 10, 2025	Dina Boluarte	Ambassador

== See also ==
- List of ambassadors of China to Peru
- List of ambassadors of Peru to Japan
- List of ambassadors of Peru to South Korea
