= Wang Ze (diplomat) =

Chinese diplomat and politician

Personal details
- Born: 1918; Boye County, Hebei, China
- Died: Unknown
- Political party: Chinese Communist Party

Wang Ze (Chinese: 王泽; pinyin: Wáng Zé; 1918–?) was a Chinese diplomat and politician.

== Career ==
Wang joined the Chinese Communist Party in 1938 and held a number of important party positions during the Second Sino–Japanese War and the Chinese Civil War.

Starting in June 1955, he served as Consul-General in Lashio (Burma). In 1969, he succeeded Yang Gongsu as ambassador to Nepal, being succeeded in 1972 by Cao Chi. In 1972, he served as his country's first ambassador to Mauritius. In 1977, he served as the ambassador to Peru, becoming the country's second ambassador. In 1981, he served as ambassador to Mexico.

Preceded by Cao Keqiang	Chinese Ambassador to Sweden; February 1983–September 1984	Succeeded by Wu Jiagan
Preceded by Liu Pu	Chinese Ambassador to Mexico; July 1981–April 1983	Succeeded by Li Chao
Preceded by Jiao Ruoyu	Chinese Ambassador to Peru; May 1977–May 1981	Succeeded by Xu Huang
Preceded by Position established	Chinese Ambassador to Mauritius; September 1972–January 1977	Succeeded by Wang Ruojie
Preceded by Yang Gongsu	Chinese Ambassador to Nepal; July 1969–August 1972	Succeeded by Cao Chi
Preceded by Guo Jing	Chinese Ambassador to East Pakistan; November 1965–1967	Succeeded by Zhang Ying
Preceded by Position established	Consul-General of China in Lashio; June 1955–July 1961	Succeeded by Yuan Shiqian
