= Zhao Wuyi =

Chinese politician and diplomat

- Born: May 1951; Beijing
- Awards: Order of the Sun, Grand Cross

Zhao Wuyi (Chinese: 趙五一; pinyin: Zhào Wǔyī) is a politician and diplomat of the People's Republic of China.

== Career ==
In 2006, he succeeded Zhang Tuo and served as the Ambassador of the People's Republic of China to Bolivia. In 2009, he succeeded Gao Zhengyue and served as the Ambassador of the People's Republic of China to Peru until 2011.

Preceded by Gao Zhengyue	Chinese Ambassador to Peru; August 2009–November 2011	Succeeded by Huang Minhui
Preceded by Zhang Tuo	Chinese Ambassador to Bolivia; February 2006–October 2008	Succeeded by Qu Shengwu
