= Liu Shih-hsun =

Chinese diplomat (1868–1929)

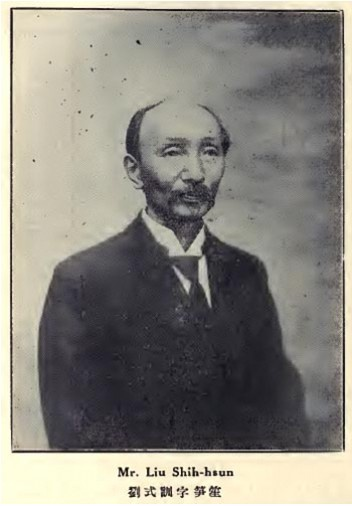
- Born: 1868; Nan-hui Hsien, China
- Died: 1929
- Education: Imperial University of Peking

Liu Shih-hsun (Chinese: 刘式训; pinyin: Liú Shìxùn; 1868–1929), was a Shanghainese diplomat of the late Qing Dynasty and the early Republic of China who served as his country's representative to several countries, including France and Peru.

== Biography ==
In 1879, he was sent by his parents to study at the Shanghai Cantonese Dialect Centre, where he majored in French and also studied classics, history and arithmetic. In 1890, after Liu graduated, he was selected to be sent to the Tongwen Guan in Peking for further studies.

In 1892, he went to Europe with Xue Fucheng, the minister of envoys to the United Kingdom, France, Italy and Belgium, and served as a translator at the legation in France.

Political offices
Preceded by Sun Baoqi	Chinese Ambassador to France; 1905–1911	Succeeded by Dai Chenlin
Preceded by Alfred Sao-ke Sze	Chinese Ambassador to Peru; December 31, 1913–May 14, 1914	Succeeded by Wu Chin-lin
