= Zhu Xiangzhong =

Chinese diplomat (1932–2022)

- 朱祥忠

Chinese Ambassador to Chile
- In office June 1990 – November 1995
- Preceded by: Huang Shikang
- Succeeded by: Wang Chengjia

Chinese Ambassador to Peru
- In office June 1988 – October 1990
- Preceded by: Yang Mai
- Succeeded by: Dai Shiqi

Personal details
- Born: 28 October 1932 Lianshui County, Jiangsu, China
- Died: 24 August 2022 (aged 89) Beijing, China
- Party: Chinese Communist Party
- Education: Suzhou University; Moscow State Institute of International Relations

Zhu Xiangzhong (Chinese: 朱祥忠; pinyin: Zhū Xiángzhōng; 28 October 1932 – 24 August 2022) was a Chinese diplomat who served as Chinese Ambassador to Peru from 1988 to 1990 and Chinese Ambassador to Chile from 1990 to 1995.

== Biography ==
Zhu was born in Lianshui County, Huai'an, Jiangsu, on 28 October 1932. He attended Xiangzhuang Primary School and Huaihai No. 1 High School. He joined the Chinese Communist Party (CCP) in December 1945. In 1950, he was admitted to Jiangsu Normal University (now Suzhou University), majoring in Chinese language and literature. After graduating in 1953, he was sent to study at Moscow State Institute of International Relations on government scholarships.

Zhu joined the Foreign Service in 1960 and has served primarily in the US-Australia Department and Europe-America Department of the Ministry of Foreign Affairs. In 1969, he was assigned to the Department of West European Affairs, and worked there until 1980, when he was despatched to the Chinese Embassy in Cuba. In 1985, he became deputy director of the Department of Affairs of the Americas and Oceania, and held that office until 1988. In June 1988, he succeeded Yang Mai as the Chinese Ambassador to Peru, serving in that position from 1988 to 1990. He served as the Chinese Ambassador to Chile from 1990 until 1995, when he was succeeded by Wang Chengjia. He retired in March 1996.

On 24 August 2022, he died of myocardial infarction, at the age of 89.

== Work ==
- 拉美亲历记——外交官看世界 [Experience in Latin America: Diplomat See the World] (in Chinese). Chengdu, Sichuan: Sichuan People's Publishing House. 2004. ISBN 9787220067075.

== Award ==
- Order of the Sun of Peru (October 1990)

Diplomatic posts
Preceded by Yang Mai	Chinese Ambassador to Peru; 1988–1995	Succeeded by Dai Shiqi
Preceded by Huang Shikang	Chinese Ambassador to Chile; 1990–1995	Succeeded by Wang Chengjia
