= List of ambassadors of China to Mauritius =

Coordinates: 20.251415°S 57.485105°E

Chinese Ambassador to Mauritius
- Incumbent; Li Li since March 2013
- Inaugural holder: Wang Ze
- Formation: September 1972; 54 years ago

The Chinese ambassador to Mauritius is the official representative of the People's Republic of China to the Republic of Mauritius.

== List of representatives ==
Diplomatic agrément/Diplomatic accreditation	Ambassador	Chinese language zh:中国驻毛里求斯大使列表	Observations	Premier of the People's Republic of China	List of prime ministers of Mauritius	Term end
September 1972	Wang Ze	zh:王泽 (外交官)	From May 1977 to May 1981 was ambassador in Peru.; From 07 1981 to April 1983 was ambassador in Mexico.; From 02 1983 to September 1984 was ambassador in Sweden.	Zhou Enlai	Seewoosagur Ramgoolam	January 1977
September 1977	Wang Ruojie	zh:王若杰	From May 1964 to December 1972 was ambassador in Sana'a (North Yemen).; From 1973 May to November 1976 he was ambassador to South Vietnam.; From September 1977 to August 1982 was ambassador in Port Louis (Mauritius).	Hua Guofeng	Anerood Jugnauth	August 1982
November 1982	Chen Feng (diplomat)	zh:陈枫	(1916 – 1986)	Zhao Ziyang	Anerood Jugnauth	November 1984
March 1985	Chen Duan	陳端		Zhao Ziyang	Anerood Jugnauth	May 1988
July 1988	Shi Nailiang	zh:施乃良	From March 1985 until April 1988 was ambassador in Cameroon.; From July 1988 to was ambassador in May 1992 in Port Louis (Mauritius).; From December 1988 to May 1992 he was ambassador to Seychelles.	Li Peng	Anerood Jugnauth	May 1992
July 1992	Yang Yihuai	zh:杨一怀	From January 1988 to May 1992 he was ambassador to Lebanon.; From 07 1992 to April 1995 he was ambassador in Port Louis (Mauritius).; From July 1992 to December 1993 she was ambassador to the Seychelles.	Li Peng	Anerood Jugnauth	April 1995
June 1995	Zheng Aquan	zh:郑阿全	From 06 1995 to August 1998 was ambassador in Port Louis (Mauritius).; From June 1998 to March 2002 he was ambassador to Algeria.	Li Peng	Anerood Jugnauth	August 1998
September 1998	Xia Shouan	夏守安		Zhu Rongji	Anerood Jugnauth	June 2002
June 18, 2002	Wang Fuyuan	zh:王富元	Vang Fuyuan: From December 1996 to March 2000 he was Chinese Ambassador to Guinea.; From June 2002 to December 2003 she was ambassador in Port Louis (Mauritius).; From 08 2003 until March 2007 she was ambassador in Slovenia.	Zhu Rongji	Anerood Jugnauth	December 2003
January 2004	Xu Mengshui	zh:许孟水	From March 1998 to October 2000 was ambassador in Guinea.; From December 2000 to December 2003 she was ambassador to Cameroon.; From January 2004 to February 2006 he was ambassador in Port Louis (Mauritius).	Wen Jiabao	Anerood Jugnauth	February 2006
March 2006	Gao Yuchen	高玉琛		Wen Jiabao	Anerood Jugnauth	April 2009
May 2009	Bian Yanhua	边燕花		Wen Jiabao	Anerood Jugnauth	March 2013
March 2013	Li Li (PRC diplomat)	李立		Li Keqiang	Anerood Jugnauth	
