= Liang Cheng =

Qing dynasty diplomat (1864–1917)

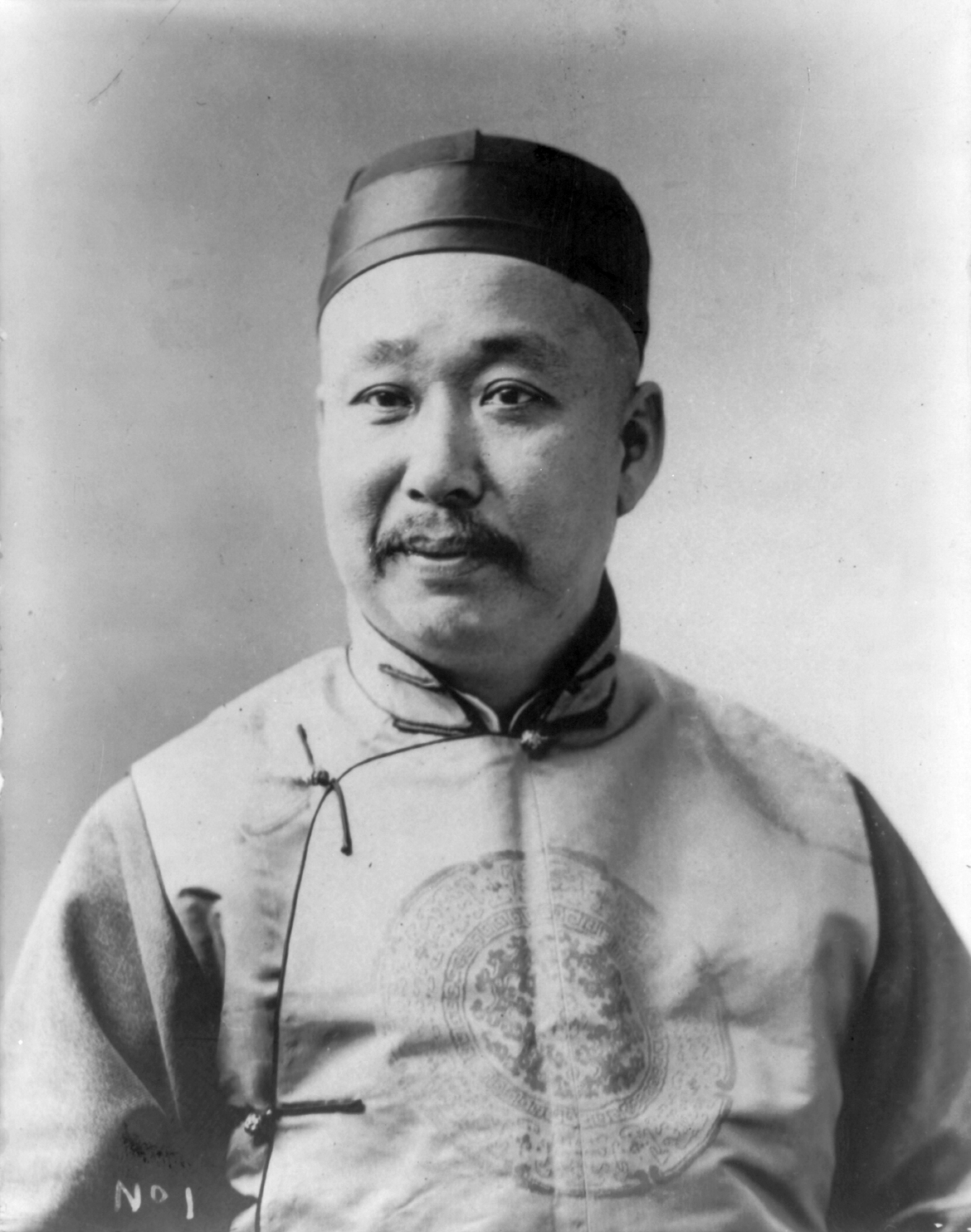

Chinese Ambassador to the United States
- In office July 19, 1902 – 1907
- Preceded by: Wu Tingfang
- Succeeded by: Wu Tingfang

Personal details
- Born: November 30, 1864 Panyu, Guangdong, Qing China
- Died: February 3, 1917 (aged 52) British Hong Kong
- Education: Phillips Academy

Liang Cheng
- Traditional Chinese: 梁誠
- Simplified Chinese: 梁诚
Transcriptions
Standard Mandarin
- Hanyu Pinyin: Liáng Chéng
Yue: Cantonese
- Yale Romanization: Lèuhng Sìhng
- Jyutping: Loeng4 Sing4

Liang Chentung
- Traditional Chinese: 梁震東
- Simplified Chinese: 梁震东
Transcriptions
Standard Mandarin
- Hanyu Pinyin: Liáng Zhèndōng
Yue: Cantonese
- Yale Romanization: Lèuhng Jan dūng
- Jyutping: Loeng4 Zan3 dung1

Liang Pi Yuk
- Chinese: 梁丕旭
Transcriptions
Standard Mandarin
- Hanyu Pinyin: Liáng Pīxù
Yue: Cantonese
- Yale Romanization: Lèuhng Pēi yūk
- Jyutping: Loeng4 Pei1 juk1

Liang Cheng KCMG KCVO (November 30, 1864 – February 3, 1917), courtesy name Liang Chentung, also known as Liang Pi Yuk, and later as Chentung Liang Cheng, was a Chinese ambassador to the United States during the Qing dynasty. He was primarily responsible for negotiating the return payment of all the US share of the Boxer Indemnity for the establishment of Tsinghua University and the Boxer Indemnity Scholarship Program.

== Early life in the United States ==
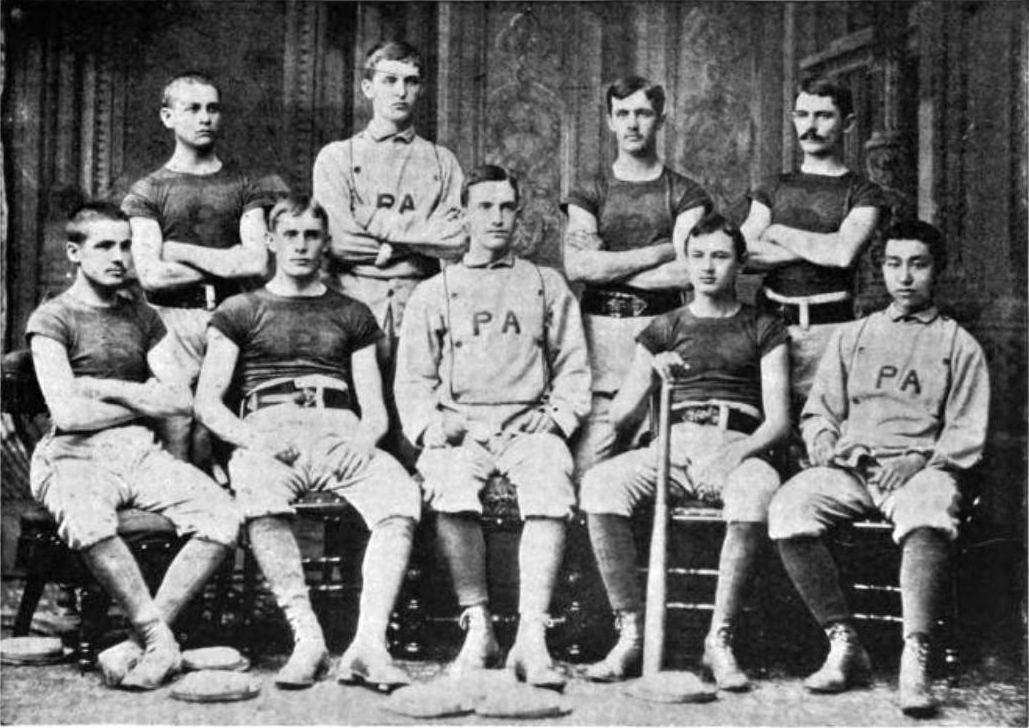
1881 Phillips Academy baseball team. Liang is sitting in the front row on the far right.

Liang was born in Panyu, Guangdong Province. At the age of 12, he was sent to study in the United States as part of the Chinese Educational Mission in 1876. He studied at Phillips Academy in Andover, Massachusetts, but returned to China in 1881 when the program was canceled.

One of the reasons for the cancellation of the mission was that the students were adopting too many American customs, and Liang was no exception. While at Phillips, he became a star baseball player for the school, most famously in a game against Phillips Exeter Academy in 1881, where he batted in three runs with two extra base hits.

== Diplomatic career ==
=== Early career ===
After returning to China, Liang joined the Ministry of Foreign Affairs. Beginning in 1885, he followed Zhang Yinhuan and served in the Chinese embassy to the United States, Spain, and Peru (one embassy served all three countries). He, along with Zhang, also participated in the negotiations for the Treaty of Shimonoseki, following China's defeat in the First Sino-Japanese War.

In 1897, again as part of Zhang's legation, he was in London for Queen Victoria's Diamond Jubilee (60th anniversary of her accession to the British throne), and was named an Honorary Knight Commander of the Order of St Michael and St George. It was at this time that he placed his courtesy name ahead of his given name and became knighted as Sir Chentung Liang Cheng.

During the Boxer Rebellion, Liang accompanied Prince Chun to Germany where the latter was to personally apologize to Kaiser Wilhelm II for the murder of Baron Clemens von Ketteler. The Kaiser wanted to have the Prince kowtow before him as a form of humiliation, but Liang was able to negotiate a compromise and the Prince merely bowed before the Kaiser in a private audience.

=== Ambassador to the United States ===
On July 19, 1902, Liang was appointed the Chinese ambassador to the United States, Spain, and Peru (this later was changed to ambassador to the United States and Mexico, and in late 1903, to just the United States), replacing Wu Tingfang. Shortly after assuming his post, Liang met with President Theodore Roosevelt, who asked him about his Phillips Academy days. As the story goes, Roosevelt asked who Liang thought was the best player on the team. Forgoing the usual Chinese cultural habit of modesty, Liang replied that he was. "From that moment the relations between President Roosevelt and myself became ten-fold stronger and closer," said Liang.

The Boxer Protocol signed at the conclusion of the Boxer Rebellion specified that China was to pay war reparations to the Eight-Nation Alliance in silver, but seven of the countries demanded payment in gold instead. The United States was amenable to silver, but changed its mind in order to preserve unanimity with the rest of the alliance. During those discussions in early 1905, US Secretary of State John Hay had mentioned to Liang that he felt the amount of the indemnity to be paid was too high, and Liang saw an opportunity to have the US return some of that money. Negotiations were initially successful, except that China did not want to reveal what it would do with the returned funds. The US was wary of political corruption and demanded that the funds would be used in "establishing educational institutions and financing foreign study". The Minister of Foreign Affairs Yuan Shikai put forth a counter-proposal that would allocate the money to building roads instead, but the Qing government did not want to present it for fear that the US would want to "interfere out of suspicion" later.

However, the refund of the indemnity did not take place until two years later. Various hurdles, such as Hay's death, mistreatment of Chinese Americans, and the killing of the missionary Eleanor Chestnut in Lianzhou, all caused delays. Furthermore, public opinion in the US was against refunding, and Hay's successor Elihu Root, despite previously being "sympathetic" toward China, now reversed course.

Liang decided to approach Commerce Secretary Oscar S. Straus and Secretary of the Interior James Rudolph Garfield. In April 1907 those two then asked Roosevelt to recheck the actual expenditures of the US Army in China. Thanks to Liang's friendly relationship with Roosevelt, the President agreed to the request. Meanwhile, Yuan had learned that his counter-proposal was never put forth to the US, and as a result, was displeased with Liang who had initiated and advocated the use of the funds towards education. In April or May, the Foreign Ministry recalled Liang to Beijing, but Liang was able to forestall this from happening. Finally on June 15, Liang was informed that the US would indeed repay a portion of its share of the indemnity (this was later increased to 50% of the final payment, and eventually in 1924 to 100%). His negotiations concluded, Liang returned to China; his replacement was the man he succeeded, Wu Tingfang.

The monies that Liang negotiated were used to establish Tsinghua University in Beijing and to fund the Boxer Indemnity Scholarship Program.

=== Later career ===
Upon his return to China, he served as the director of the Guangdong–Hankou Railway, President of the Board of Foreign Affairs, and Comptroller General of Maritime Customs at Beijing. In 1909, he accompanied Prince Rui as a member of the Chinese Imperial Naval Commission to study the navies of western nations. In 1910–11, he became the Chinese Minister to Berlin, and during that time was conferred the Order of the Red Eagle, 1st Class. His final assignment was as China's representative to the First International Opium Convention at The Hague in 1912. When the Qing dynasty fell, he retired to Huangpu village in Guangdong, and then later to Hong Kong, where he died in 1917.

== Family ==
Liang was married three times to women whose names are not recorded, except that one had the surname Huang (黄). His first wife died before he became the ambassador to the United States, and bore him ten children. From his second marriage, he had another son, for a total of eleven children.

He had been engaged to Nellie Yu Roung Ling, daughter of a Qing-dynasty diplomat to France, at least as early as January 1903. But for some unknown reason, the two were never married to each other.

== Honors and awards ==
- Honorary Knight Commander of the Order of St Michael and St George (KCMG)
- Knight Commander of the Royal Victorian Order (KCVO)
- Legion of Honour (France)
- Order of the Rising Sun (Japan)
- Order of Saint Anna, 2nd class (Russia)
- Order of the Red Eagle, 1st Class (Germany)
- Honorary graduate, Amherst College (1885)
- Honorary LL.D, Amherst College (1903)
- Honorary LL.D, Yale University (1906)
