= Yang Mai =

Chinese diplomat (born 1923)

- Born: 1923
- Education: Peking University
- Awards: Order of the Sun, Grand Cross

Yang Mai (Chinese: 杨迈; pinyin: Yáng Mài; born 1923) is a Chinese diplomat who represented his country as ambassador to Peru and to Guyana.

== Biography ==
In 1946, he studied at Peking University. In 1947, he served as a member of the Standing Committee of the Human Rights Protection Committee of the North China Federation of Students. At the beginning of 1948, he served as the commander-in-chief of the joint self-defense force of teachers and students of Haidian University. In May, he left Beijing and went to the Department of Political and Educational Affairs of North China Military and Political University as a theoretical teacher. In May 1950, he was transferred to the Ministry of Foreign Affairs and served as a staff member of the Cadre Education Section of the Personnel Office of the General Office of the Ministry of Foreign Affairs, and was later promoted to deputy section chief. In 1955, the Personnel Department was upgraded to the Personnel Department of the Ministry of Foreign Affairs. He still served as the deputy section chief of the Cadre Education Section of the Personnel Department and was later promoted to section chief. In 1960, he served as the Chief of Cuba Section of the American and Australian Department of the Ministry of Foreign Affairs, and was later assigned as the Second Secretary of the Embassy in Havana. In 1969, he worked at the Hubei Cadre School of the Ministry of Foreign Affairs. In 1971, he served as the head of the Foreign Affairs Section of the Hubei Provincial Revolutionary Committee. In 1972, he served as First Secretary of the Embassy in Argentina. In 1975, he served as First Secretary and Charge d'Affaires of the Embassy in Trinidad and Tobago. After returning to China, he served as director of the fourth division of the Department of Americas and Oceania of the Ministry of Foreign Affairs, and was later promoted to deputy director of the Department of American and Oceanian Affairs of the Ministry of Foreign Affairs. In July 1983, he served as ambassador to Guyana. In October 1984, he served as ambassador to Peru until his resignation in March 1988. In December 1992, the China-Cuba Friendship Association resumed operations, with Yang Mai as vice president.

Preceded by Xu Huang	Chinese Ambassador to Peru; October 1984–March 1988	Succeeded by Zhu Xiangzhong
Preceded by Wang Yanchang	Chinese Ambassador to Guyana; July 1983–October 1984	Succeeded by Ni Zhengjian
Preceded by Zhao Zhengyi	Chinese Ambassador to Colombia; Did not take office March 1983–May 1983	Succeeded by Tao Dazhao
