= Wang Teh-fen =

Chinese diplomat

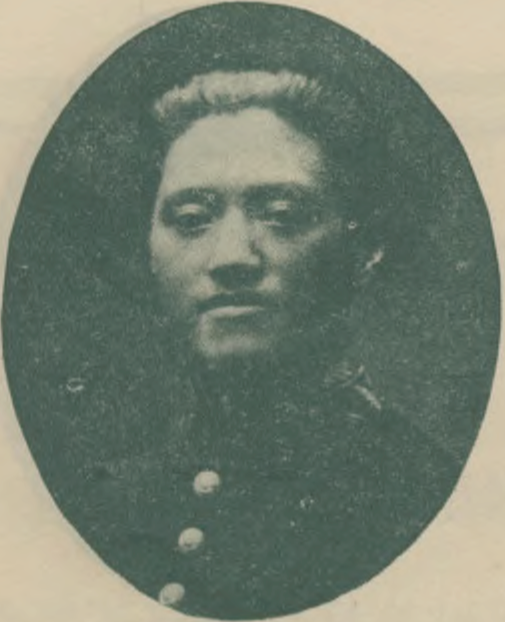
- Born: 1900; Huzhou, Chekiang Province, China
- Died: 20th century

Wang Teh-fen (Chinese: 王德棻; pinyin: Wáng Défēn; 1900–?), courtesy name Songjiao (Chinese: 頌椒), was a diplomat of the Republic of China who represented his country as consul in Makassar and as chargé d'affaires in Peru.

== Biography ==
Born in Huzhou in 1900, he studied in his native district, attending Nanyang Middle School in Shanghai and then studying business.

He once served as the chief of the consulate in Patong, having joined in 1924. In 1926, he became an attaché (Third Secretary) of the Legation in Peru, being named chargé d'affaires in 1929.

In 1930, he was transferred to Consul in Makassar. He was assigned to the post on March 27 of that year and took office on July 1. He served for at least five years. During World War II, he was detained by Japanese forces upon their invasion of the Dutch East Indies.
