= Dai Shiqi =

Chinese diplomat

Dai Shiqi (Chinese: 戴詩琪; pinyin: Dài Shīqí) is a diplomat of the People's Republic of China.

== Career ==
In 1987, he succeeded Liu Fangpu as ambassador of China to Equatorial Guinea. In 1990, Wang Yongcheng took over. He succeeded Zhu Xiangzhong as ambassador of China to Peru. In 1993, Chen Jiuchang took over.

Preceded by Zhu Xiangzhong	Chinese Ambassador to Peru; October 1990–August 1993	Succeeded by Chen Jiuchang
Preceded by Liu Fangpu	Chinese Ambassador to Equatorial Guinea; March 1987–July 1990	Succeeded by Wang Yongcheng
