= Gao Zhengyue =

Chinese diplomat (born 1951)

- Born: January 1951; Luquan, Shijiazhuang
- Education: Beijing Foreign Studies University
- Awards: Order of the Sun, Grand Cross

Gao Zhengyue (Chinese: 高正月; pinyin: Gāo Zhēngyuè) is a diplomat of the People's Republic of China.

== Career ==
In 1975, he graduated from Beijing Foreign Studies University and entered the Ministry of Foreign Affairs of the People's Republic of China. In the same year, he went to El Colegio de México for further studies. Since 1978, he has served in the Embassy in Argentina, the Department of Americas and Oceania of the Ministry of Foreign Affairs, the Embassy in Nicaragua, the Department of Latin America and the Caribbean of the Ministry of Foreign Affairs, the Embassy in Chile, and the Embassy in Bolivia, where he later served as counselor. In 2000, he served as counselor of the Latin American Department of the Ministry of Foreign Affairs. In August 2002, he served as the Consul-General of the People's Republic of China in Barcelona. In February 2007, he served as the Ambassador of the People's Republic of China to Peru. From August 2009 to September 2011, he served as the Ambassador of the People's Republic of China to Colombia.

Preceded by Li Changhua	Chinese Ambassador to Colombia; August 2009–September 2011	Succeeded by Wang Xiaoyuan
Preceded by Yin Hengmin	Chinese Ambassador to Peru; February 2007–July 2009	Succeeded by Zhao Wuyi
Preceded by Meng Gengfu	Chinese Consul-General in Barcelona; August 2002–October 2006	Succeeded by Wang Shixiong
