= Cheng Tsao-ju =

Chinese politician (1827–1894)

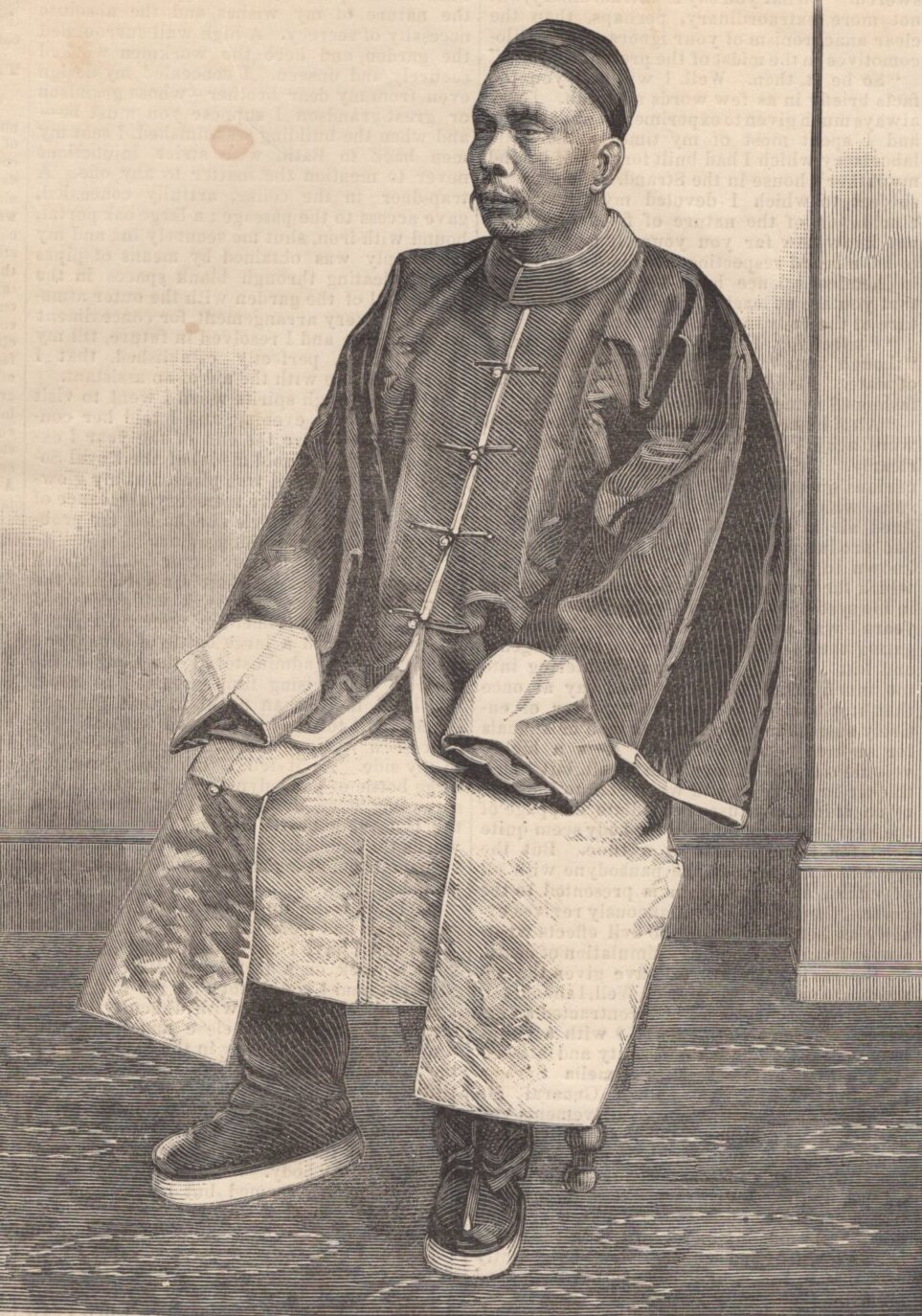
- Cheng Tsao-ju in San Francisco, 1882

Minister of the Court of Imperial Entertainments
- In office April 19 – July 26, 1885 Serving with Yinian
- Preceded by: Zhang Xukai
- Succeeded by: Shao Yuelian

2nd Chinese Ambassador to the United States
- In office June 24, 1881 – July 26, 1885
- Preceded by: Chen Lanbin
- Succeeded by: Zhang Yinhuan

Personal details
- Born: 1827 Zhongshan, Xiangshan County, Guangdong, China
- Died: 1894 (aged 66–67)
- Occupation: politician, diplomat
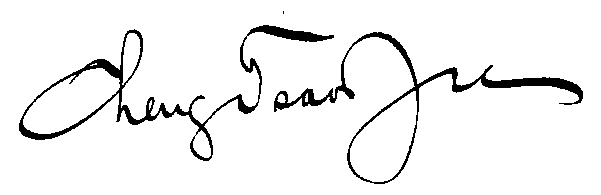
- Signature

Cheng Tsao-ju
- Traditional Chinese: 鄭藻如
- Simplified Chinese: 郑藻如
Transcriptions
Standard Mandarin
- Hanyu Pinyin: Zhèng Zǎorú
- Wade–Giles: Cheng4 Tsao3-ju2
Yue: Cantonese
- Jyutping: zeng6 zou2 jyu4

Cheng Tsao-ju (Chinese: 鄭藻如; pinyin: Zhèng Zǎorú; 1827–1894), courtesy name Zhixiang (Chinese: 志翔), was the second Chinese Ambassador to the United States during the Qing dynasty.

== Biography ==
In 1851, he passed the provincial examination and was subsequently assigned to work in the Shanghai Machinery Bureau. During the Guangxu period, he was transferred to the Tianjin Customs Road in Zhili. In 1881, he was appointed as the imperial envoy to the United States, Spain and Peru. Later, he served as the cabinet minister and minister of Honglu Temple. In the tenth year of Guangxu's reign (1884), he served as deputy envoy of the General Affairs Department, and the following year he was promoted to minister of Guanglu Temple.

Political offices
| Preceded by Chen Lanbin | Chinese Ambassador to the United States (Accredited to Peru and Spain); 1827–1894 | Succeeded by Zhang Yinhuan |
