= Zhang Yinhuan =

Chinese diplomat (1837–1900)

Zhang Yinhuan GCMG
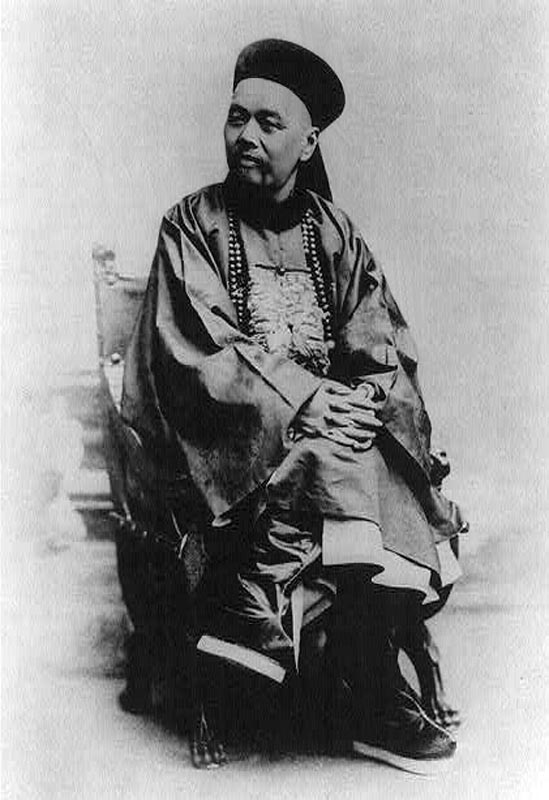

Minister of Zongli Yamen
- In office March 29, 1890 – September 24, 1898
- In office June 8 – September 3, 1884

3rd Chinese ambassador to the United States
- In office July 27, 1885 – September 28, 1889
- Preceded by: Zheng Zaoru
- Succeeded by: Tsui Kwo Yin

Personal details
- Born: 1837 Nanhai, Foshan
- Died: 1900 (aged 62–63) Xinjiang

Zhang Yinhuan GCMG (Chinese: 張蔭桓; pinyin: Zhāng Yīnhuán; 1837–1900), courtesy names Haoluan (Chinese: 皓巒) and Qiaoye (Chinese: 樵野), was the third Chinese Ambassador to the United States during the Qing dynasty.

== Biography ==
At a young age, Zhang failed in his first attempt to enter civil service through taking the imperial examination. But in 1862, he followed his uncle to Jinan, paid money, and obtained the status of Zhejiang. He then went on to became a staff officer in the Shandong Census. His abilities were evaluated by the Shandong Census and Ding Baozhen, and he was recommended to the Taoist, and was promoted to Azechi.

Eventually, he was called to Beijing and joined the Prime Minister's Department of Foreign Affairs, where he was promoted to Sajuro Tobe, and after that held successive positions in the Engineering Department, Criminal Affairs Department, Military Department, Religious Affairs Department, and Office Department. In 1885, he became minister to the United States, Spain, and Peru. During his tenure, he consulted on the issues of overseas Chinese workers.

In 1895, due to the crushing defeat of the Beiyang Fleet in the Sino-Japanese War, the Qing court dispatched Yinhuan and Shao Youlian, the commander of Hunan, as ambassadors with plenipotentiary power to make peace. However, he was refused negotiations in Hiroshima and was eventually replaced by Li Hongzhang and his adopted son Li Jingfang, who signed the Treaty of Shimonoseki.

In 1897, he visited the United Kingdom, the United States, France, Germany, and Russia. In March 1898, he served as deputy plenipotentiary for the Russo-Qing Treaty on Port Arthur and Dalian Concession, which was signed in Beijing (the chief plenipotentiary was Li Hongzhang).

Yinhuan supported the law reform movement and was close to Kang Youwei, so he was exiled to new- established Xinjiang Province after the Hundred Days' Reform. In 1900, he was executed in exile during the Boxer Rebellion.
