= List of ambassadors of China to Trinidad and Tobago =

Chinese Ambassador

Coordinates: 10.671796°N 61.521502°W

Chinese Ambassador to Trinidad and Tobago
- Inaugural holder: Wang Zhanyuan
- Formation: 1974; 52 years ago

The Chinese ambassador to Trinidad and Tobago is the official representative of the People's Republic of China to the Republic of Trinidad and Tobago.

== List of representatives ==
Diplomatic agrément/Diplomatic accreditation	Ambassador	Chinese language zh:中国驻特立尼达和多巴哥大使列表	Observations	Premier of the People's Republic of China	List of prime ministers of Trinidad and Tobago	Term end
June 20, 1974			The People's Republic of China and Trinidad and Tobago established diplomatic relations on June 20, 1974.	Zhou Enlai	Eric Williams	
September 1974	Wang Zhanyuan	王占元	Con residence in Georgetown (Guyana), 1973-1979: Ambassador to Georgetown (Guyana) 1975-1979: Ambassador to Port of Spain 1993: Vilnius	Zhou Enlai	Eric Williams	May 1979
August 1979	Wang Yanchang	王言昌	coaccredited	Hua Guofeng	Eric Williams	February 1983
September 1983	Cui Mingtang	崔明堂		Zhao Ziyang	George Chambers	May 1987
August 1987	Zhang Ruizong	张瑞琮		Li Peng	A. N. R. Robinson	April 1991
June 1991	Cheng Shaoliang	程绍良		Li Peng	A. N. R. Robinson	July 1994
July 1994	Lu Shulin	zh:陆树林	* From July 1994 - March 1998 he was Ambassador of the People's Republic of China to Trinidad and Tobago. From January 1999 - May 2002 he was Chinese Ambassador to Pakistan.	Li Peng	A. N. R. Robinson	March 1998
April 1998	Zhang Songxian	章颂先		Zhu Rongji	A. N. R. Robinson	October 2001
November 2001	Xu Ya'nan	徐亚男		Zhu Rongji	A. N. R. Robinson	January 2004
March 2004	Wang Zhiquan	zh:王治权		Wen Jiabao	George Maxwell Richards	November 2005
February 2006	Huang Xing	zh:黄兴 (外交官)		Wen Jiabao	George Maxwell Richards	July 2009
October 2009	Yang Youming	杨优明		Wen Jiabao	George Maxwell Richards	March 2013
April 2013	Huang Xingyuan	黄星原		Li Keqiang	Anthony Carmona	July 2016
August 2016	Song Yumin	宋昱旻		Li Keqiang	Anthony Carmona	March 2023

== See also ==
- Ambassadors of China
- China–Trinidad and Tobago relations
