= Wu Chin-lin =

Chinese diplomat

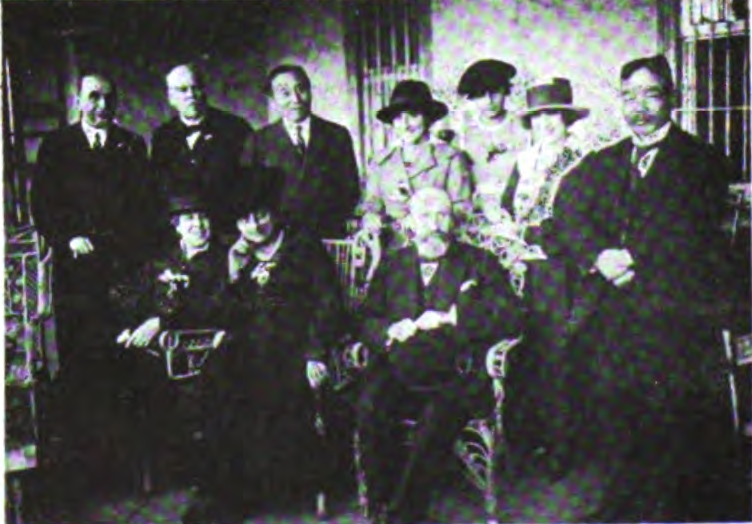
- Born: 19th century Jiaxing, China
- Died: 20th century
- Education: University of Tokyo

Wu Chin-lin (Chinese: 吳振麟; pinyin: Wú Zhènlín; ?–?), also written Chin Lin Woo, was a diplomat of the late Qing Dynasty and the early Republic of China who served as his country's representative to Peru and Uruguay in the early 20th century.

== Biography ==
In October 1898, Wu travelled to Japan to study at his own expense and entered the Japanese–Chinese School. Later, he transferred his official expenses to the First Higher School and the Law Department of Tokyo Imperial University. While in Japan, he joined the Translation and Compilation Society. After returning to China, Wu Zhenlin served as director of the Ministry of Agriculture, Industry and Commerce, and later as deputy clerk of the Statistics Bureau of the Commission for Studying Constitutional Government.

As diplomat, he represented his country in Peru and Uruguay, arriving to the latter on February 26, 1919, to attend the inauguration of Baltasar Brum as special envoy of his country.

Political offices
Preceded by Liu Shih-hsun	Chinese Ambassador to Peru; December 26, 1913–1917?	Succeeded by Hsia Yi-Ting
