= List of ambassadors of China to Guyana =

Coordinates: 6.803142°N 58.137964°W

Ambassador of China to Guyana
- Incumbent; Cui Jianchun since January 2017
- Inaugural holder: Wang Zhanyuan
- Formation: March 1973; 53 years ago

The ambassador of China to Guyana is the official representative of the People's Republic of China to the Co-operative Republic of Guyana.

== List of representatives ==
Designated/accredited	Ambassador	Chinese language zh:中国驻圭亚那大使列表	Observations	Term end
March 1973	Wang Zhanyuan (ambassador)	王占元		May 1979
August 1979	Wang Yanchang	王言昌		February 1983
July 1983	Yang Mai	zh:杨迈	Ambassador of Peru October 1984 to March 1988	October 1984
December 1984	Ni Zhengjian	zh:倪政健	Ambassador of New Zealand October 1987 - October 1991	August 1987
October 1987	Yang Zengye	杨增业		August 1991
September 1991	Wang Baomin	王保民		September 1994
October 1994	Zhang Yu (ambassador)	张愉		December 1996
December 1996	Wang Fuyuan	zh:王富元	Ambassador of Mauritius from 2002 - December 2003, Slovenia August 2003 - March 2007	March 2000
May 2000	Wu Zhenglong (ambassador)	吴正龙		February 2002
March 2002	Song Tao (diplomat)	zh:宋涛 (外交官)		August 2004
September 2004	Shen Qing (ambassador)	沈庆		October 2006
December 2006	Zhang Jungao	张君高		August 2010
August 2010	Yu Wenzhe	zh:于文哲	Ambassador of Ghana June 2007 - July 2010	November 2012
December 2012	Zhang Limin	zh:张利民		January 2017
January 4, 2017	Cui Jianchun	崔建春		Incumbent as of January 2020
