= Chen Jiuchang =

Chinese politician (YYYY–YYYY)

- Born: 1934
- Education: Hunan Normal University

Chen Jiuchang (Chinese: 陳久長; pinyin: Chén Jiǔzhǎng) is a diplomat of the People's Republic of China.

== Career ==
In 1958, he graduated from the Chinese Department of Hunan Normal University and stayed at the school to teach. In 1964, he was transferred to the Ministry of Foreign Affairs of the People's Republic of China and worked successively in the Department of Americas and Oceania of the Ministry of Foreign Affairs, the Embassy in the United States, and the Department of Cadres of the Ministry of Foreign Affairs, and served as deputy director of the Department of Cadres. In September 1990, he served as ambassador of China to Cuba. He later served as ambassador of China to Peru from September 1993 until his resignation in November 1996.

Preceded by Dai Shiqi	Chinese Ambassador to Peru; September 1993–November 1996	Succeeded by Ren Jingyu
Preceded by Tang Yonggui	Chinese Ambassador to Cuba; September 1990–August 1993	Succeeded by Xu Yicong
