= Yang Yü (diplomat) =

Chinese diplomat

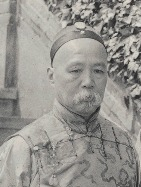
Yang Yü

Yang Yü (Chinese: 楊儒; pinyin: Yáng Rú; 1840 – 17 February 1902) was a diplomat of the Qing dynasty. He was the Chinese ambassador to the United States from 1893-1896 and ambassador to Russia (1896-?).

Yang signed the Gresham-Yang Treaty in 1894 with Walter Q. Gresham, the US Secretary of State. It is a crucial extension of the Chinese Exclusion Act of 1882 and the direct cause for the 1905 Chinese boycott.
