= China–Peru relations =

- China: Peru

Diplomatic mission
- Embassy of China, Lima: Embassy of Peru, Beijing

China–Peru relations (Chinese: 中秘关系; pinyin: Zhōng mì guānxì; Spanish: Relaciones China-Perú) are foreign relations between the People's Republic of China and the Republic of Peru. Peru is the first Latin American country with which China established formal ties, which was done by the Qing dynasty in August 1875. Both nations are members of the Asia-Pacific Economic Cooperation and the United Nations.

Relations between both nations went through three stages: Chinese coolieism as an institutionalization of human capital export to Latin America during the nineteenth century; the Maoist ideology transfer in the 1970s and 1980s; and, from the 1990s onwards, through international trade and cultural and Mandarin language centers—the Confucius Institute.

== History ==
Relations were established more than 160 years ago, intertwined with local social imageries, power structures, and narratives. Peru established relations with the Qing dynasty with the signing of a treaty in Tianjin on June 26, 1874. Peru's first Resident Ambassador was named the next year, assuming his duties on May 20, 1878, while the Chinese ambassador would only reach Peru in 1883, after the War of the Pacific. Relations between both states started with the Coolie Trade and matured during the ‘Hundred Years weakness and poverty’ (Wang, 1993) from the 1840s to 1949 of the impoverished Qing China, followed by a republic divided by civil wars and invaded by Japan.

After the establishment of the Republic of China, Peru maintained its relations with the new Kuomintang government. In 1944, the diplomatic status of the two countries was raised to embassy level, and high-level officials of the two countries exchanged frequent visits in the 1950s and 1960s. As a result of the Chinese Civil War, Peru closed its embassy in Beijing in 1946.

=== Relations since 1971 ===
After the establishment of Juan Velasco Alvarado's Revolutionary Government, Peru established relations with the People's Republic of China on November 2, 1971, with the Republic of China severing its relations and closing its embassy in Lima as a result, and the PRC opening its embassy the following year. As such, Peru became the third Latin American country to recognize the Beijing-based government. Since the establishment of relations between Peru and the PRC, the South American country has adhered to the One China policy.

In May 1978, the ROC established the "Far East Trade Center" in Lima to promote bilateral trade. On November 5, 1990, President Alberto Fujimori approved Supreme Executive Order No. RE014, agreeing to change the name of "Far East Trade Center" to "Taipei Economic and Cultural Office in Peru". On March 3, 1994, Peru established a "Taipei Trade Office" in Taiwan.

Peru and the PRC signed a free trade agreement in April 2009. The agreement was officially ratified by both countries governments on December 6, 2009, and came into effect on March 1, 2010. As of 2025, Chinese investment in Peru is primarily in the resources sector and predominantly mining-related.

Peru joined the Belt and Road Initiative (BRI) in 2019.

President of Peru Dina Boluarte pays a state visit to China to meet with Chinese President and CCP General Secretary Xi Jinping from June 25, 2024, to June 29, 2024.

During a November 2024 visit by Xi Jinping to Peru, Boluarte and Xi celebrated the opening of the Port of Chancay, which is part of the Belt and Road Initiative. Xi described the port as the beginning of a new maritime-land corridor between China and Latin America. The port was built by COSCO Shipping Ports.

In November 2026, Peruvian president Keiko Fujimori visited Shenzhen to attend APEC China 2026. Fujimori met with Chinese leader Xi Jinping, and asked China for help regarding the 2026–2027 El Niño event and said Peru was "introducing countercyclical measures to prevent the economy from slowing" and "like you, ensure that poverty levels continue to decline"; Xi pledged US$15 million in non-repayable aid plus US$7.5 million in machinery.

=== Subnational relations ===
Peru is represented at the Special Administrative Regions of the People's Republic of China at a local level by the Consulate-General of Peru in Hong Kong, which is also accredited to Macau. Macau is, nevertheless, also represented by an honorary consulate. Relations with the regions are carried out within the framework of relations with the People's Republic of China.

==== Hong Kong ====
Hong Kong–Peru relations
- Hong Kong: Peru

Diplomatic mission
- None (Represented by China): Consulate-General of Peru, Hong Kong

Hong Kong–Peru relations are carried out under the larger context of relations with China and date back to the British era of the region.

Many Chinese Peruvians are descendants of coolies that came from East Asia, including then British Hong Kong. Recorded voyages of coolie ships to Peru include the Lady Montagne (February 17, 1850; left with 450 coolies on board), the Albert (September 7, 1850; 156 coolies), the Victory (December 6, 1851; 335 coolies) the Beatrice (January 20, 1852; 300 coolies), the Frederich (January 19, 1869; 379 coolies), etc. In 1870, the Governor of Hong Kong, Richard Graves MacDonnell, accused the Peruvian consul in China, César A. del Río, of being involved in this trade after it was outlawed.

In the 1960s, Peru established honorary consulates in British Hong Kong. A Peruvian delegation of the Public Fishmeal and Fish Oil Marketing Company (Spanish: Empresa Pública de Comercialización Harina y Aceite de pescado) visited Hong Kong in 1970 to study the mainland Chinese market up close. This resulted in the opening of a Commercial Office in Beijing in September of the following year as a prelude of the formalisation of relations in November.

In 1991, Hong Kong was visited by Minister of Economy and Finance Carlos Boloña and President Alberto Fujimori. In 1997, Prime Minister Alberto Pandolfi represented Peru at the Hong Kong handover ceremony.

In 2008, an agreement was signed aiming at the negotiation of a free trade agreement between both regions. Said negotiations started in 2023. In 2022, Peruvian exports were valued at US$ 262 million, while Hong Kong's exports were valued at US$25 million.

==== Macau ====
Macau–Peru relations
- Macau: Peru

Macau–Peru relations (Chinese: 澳门与秘鲁关系; pinyin: Àomén yǔ bìlǔ guānxì; Spanish: Relaciones Macao-Perú; Portuguese: Relações Macau-Peru) are also carried out under the larger context of relations with China and date back to the Portuguese era of the region.

Similar to neighbouring Hong Kong, the early history of relations took place in the context of the coolie trade and within Peru's relations with Portugal. From 1849 to 1857, a large number of ships left for Callao, until the trade was suspended by the British and Chinese authorities. This meant that from 1860 onwards, a second wave of Chinese immigration to Peru took place with Macau serving as its exclusive starting point. The last ship to leave to Peru was the Peruvian Lola, who left in July 1874 and reached Peru with 6 coolies dying in the journey. A year before, the Overseas Ministry had prohibited the trade of coolies to Peru and Cuba due to the conditions they were subject to upon arrival.

Peru is a recurring participant in the annual Macao International Trade and Investment Fair, where trade between both regions is promoted.

==== Taiwan ====
Due to its official relations with mainland China, Peru de jure recognizes Taiwan as part of China. However, since 1978, relations between Peru and the ROC are unofficially maintained through representative offices in Taipei and Lima.

== Public opinion ==
A survey published in 2026 by the Pew Research Center found that 64% of Peruvians had a favorable view of China, while 26% had an unfavorable view. It also found that 72% of Peruvians in the 18-35 age group had positive opinions of China.

== High-level visits ==
Peruvian President Keiko Fujimori and Chinese President Xi Jinping at the APEC summit in Shenzhen, China; November 2026.

Presidential visits from China to Peru

- President Hu Jintao (2008)
- President Xi Jinping (2016, 2024)

High-level visits from Peru to China

- Minister Carlos Boloña (1991)
- President Alberto Fujimori (1991 & 1999)
- President of Congress Víctor Joy Way (1997)
- Prime Minister Alberto Pandolfi (1997)
- President Alejandro Toledo (2005)
- President Alan García (2008)
- President Ollanta Humala (2013)
- President Pedro Pablo Kuczynski (2016)
- President Dina Boluarte (2024)
- President Keiko Fujimori (2026)

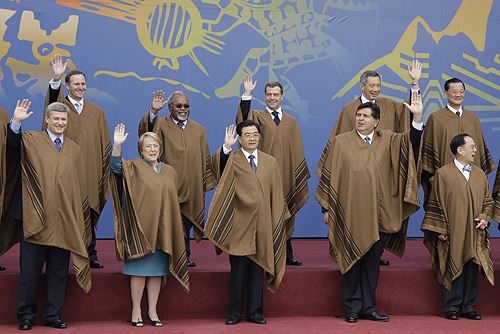
President Alan García and President Hu Jintao in Lima; November 2008.

President Ollanta Humala and President Hu Jintao in Honolulu, Hawaii; November 2011.

President Pedro Pablo Kuczynski and President Xi Jinping in Lima; November 2016.

== Resident diplomatic missions ==
of China in Peru

- Lima (Embassy)

of Peru in China

- Beijing (Embassy)
- Guangzhou (Consulate-General)
- Hong Kong (Consulate-General)
- Shanghai (Consulate-General)

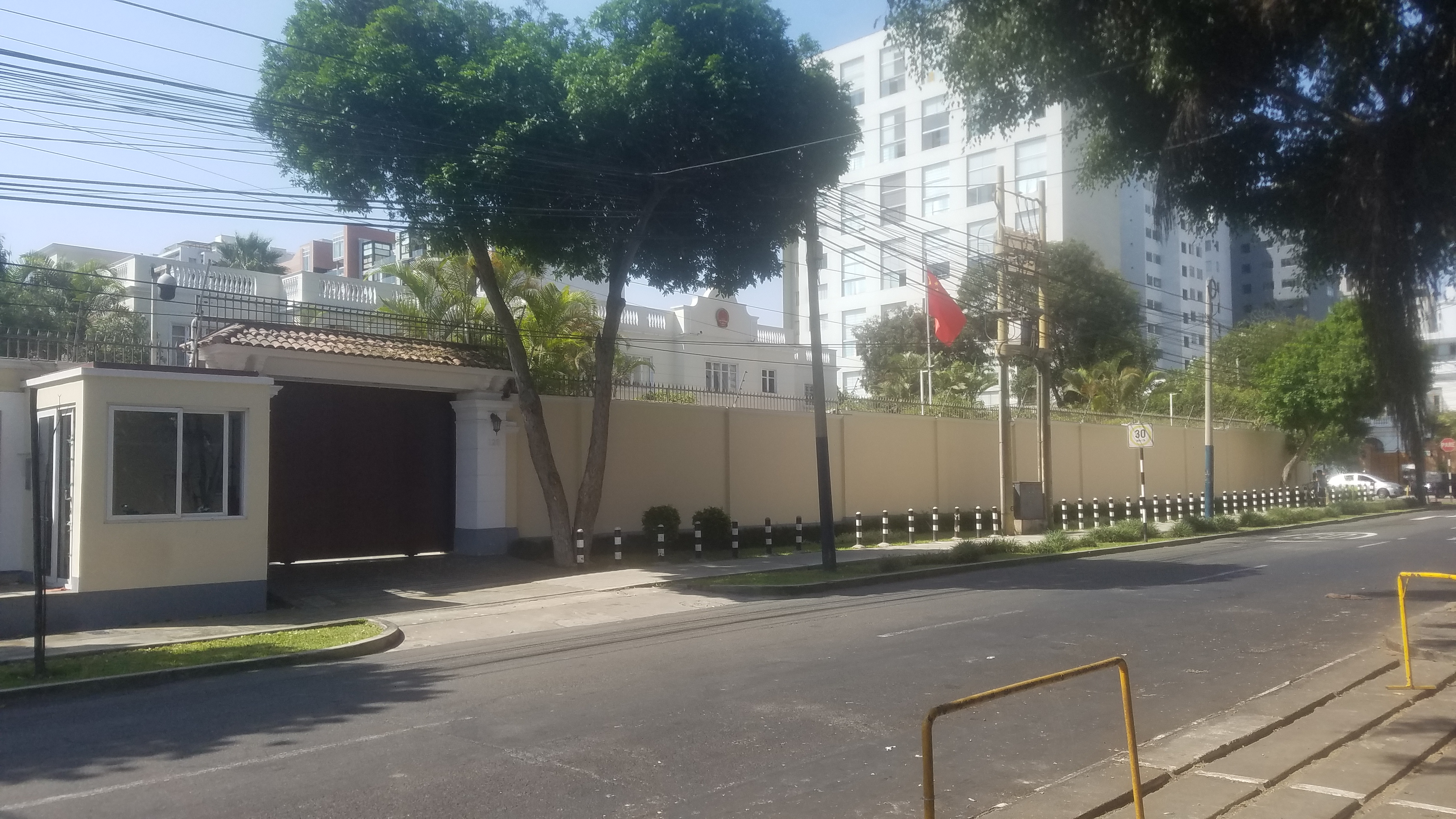
Embassy of China in Lima

== See also ==
- List of ambassadors of China to Peru
- List of ambassadors of Peru to China
- China–Peru Free Trade Agreement

== Bibliography ==
- Basadre Grohmann, Jorge (2014). Historia de la República del Perú [1822-1933]. Vol. 5. El Comercio. ISBN 978-612-306-353-5.
- Clemente Pecho, Jazmina Lizbeth (2020). La importancia de la rectoría del Ministerio de Relaciones Exteriores del Perú en la celebración de instrumentos internacionales: análisis de la celebración de instrumentos con entidades no estatales en el marco de las relaciones del Perú con China y Taiwán (PDF) (in Spanish). Lima: Academia Diplomática del Perú Javier Pérez de Cuéllar. p. 84.
- García Corrochano, Luis (2019). "Las relaciones entre Perú y China en perspectiva histórica". La conexión China en la Política exterior del Perú en el siglo XXI (in Spanish). Lima: PUCP. ISBN 9781909890459.
- Rodriguez Pastor, Humberto (2017). Chinos en la sociedad peruana: 1850-2000 (PDF) (in Spanish).
