= Chen Lanbin =

Chinese politician and diplomat (1816–1895)

- 陳蘭彬
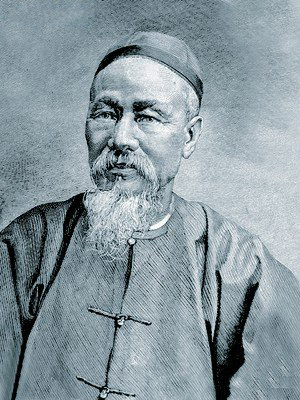

1st Chinese Ambassador to the United States
- In office 11 December 1875 – 24 June 1881
- Preceded by: Position established
- Succeeded by: Cheng Tsao-Ju

Minister of Zongli Yamen
- In office 19 April 1882 – 3 September 1884

Minister of Court of Imperial Sacrifices
- In office 9 September 1876 – 22 March 1878 Serving with Gengfu (until 1877), Hūturi (since 1877)
- Preceded by: Liu Youming
- Succeeded by: Liu Jintang

Personal details
- Born: 1816 Wuchuan district, Guangdong, China
- Died: 1895 (aged 78–79) Wuchuan, Guangdong, China
- Occupation: politician, diplomat

Chen Lanbin
- Traditional Chinese: 陳蘭彬
- Simplified Chinese: 陈兰彬
Transcriptions
Standard Mandarin
- Hanyu Pinyin: Chén Lánbīn
- Wade–Giles: Ch'en2 Lan2-pin1

Li Qiu
- Chinese: 荔秋
Transcriptions
Standard Mandarin
- Hanyu Pinyin: Lì Qiū
- Wade–Giles: Li4 Ch'iu1

Chen Lanbin (traditional Chinese: 陳蘭彬; simplified Chinese: 陈兰彬; pinyin: Chén Lánbīn; 1816–1895), courtesy name Li Qiu (Chinese: 荔秋; pinyin: Lì Qiū), was a Chinese politician and diplomat who was the first Chinese Ambassador to the United States.

Born in Wuchuan City, Guangdong, he passed the Chinese imperial examination in 1853 at the age of 24, and entered the Hanlin Academy. He soon became the head of two departments of the Qing government in succession, and in 1872 he was sent to the United States and named commissioner of the Chinese Educational Commission in Hartford, Connecticut, despite not knowing English. He occupied numerous other positions until 1875, when he began acting as the government's representative in the United States. He was formally named the Chinese Ambassador to the United States, Spain, and Peru in 1878, a position that he held until 1881. A conservative, Chen was often at odds with the progressive oriented Yung Wing, the first Chinese student to graduate from an American university, and a colleague of his.

In 2015, Chen was featured in an article by China Daily, which remembered his efforts in promoting China–United States relations.
