= Song Yang (diplomat) =

Chinese politician (YYYY–YYYY)

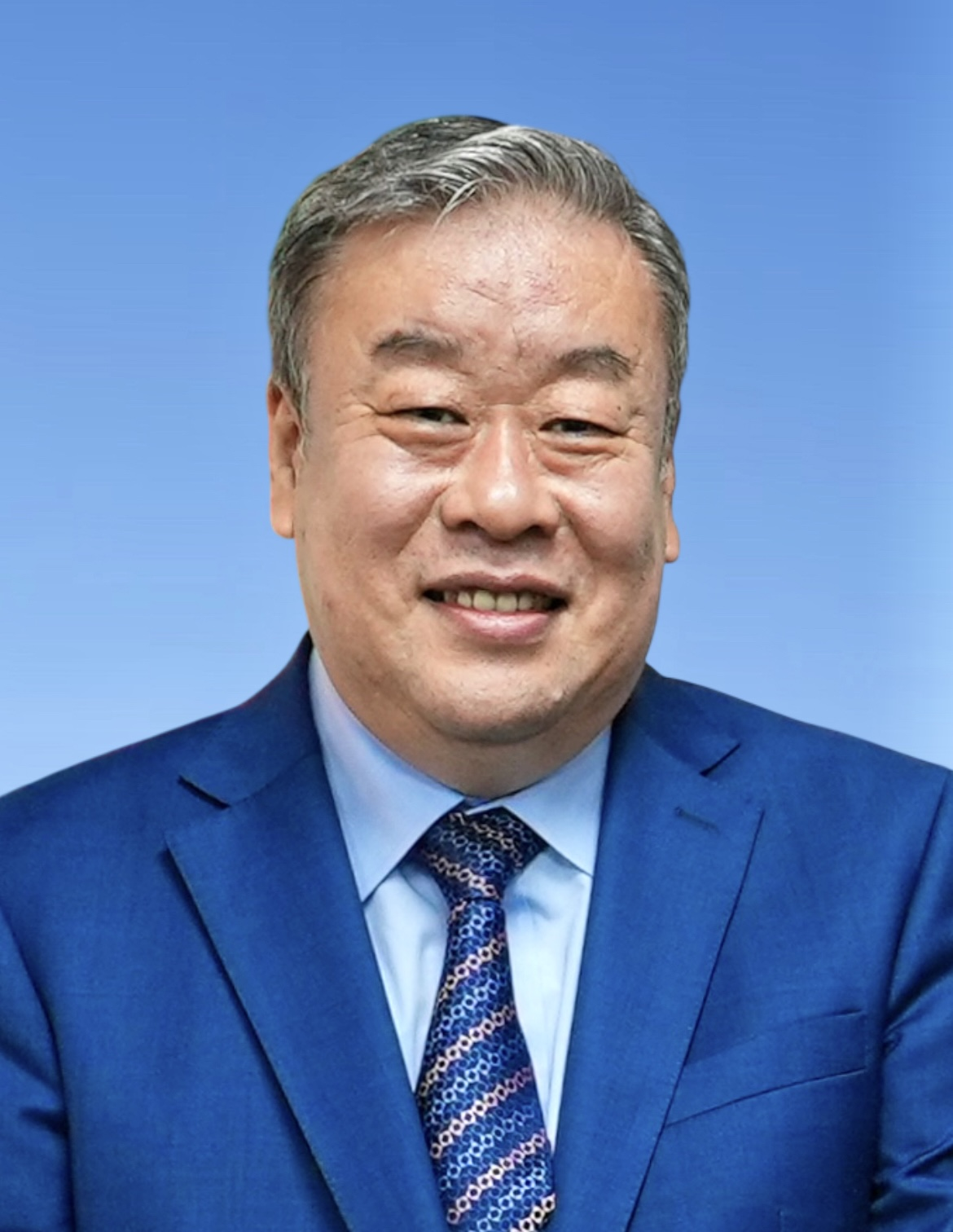
- Portrait, 2026

17th Ambassador of China to Peru
- Incumbent
- Assumed office August 2022
- President: Xi Jinping
- Preceded by: Liang Yu

Personal details
- Born: August 1967

Song Yang (Chinese: 宋揚; pinyin: Sòng Yáng) is a diplomat of the People's Republic of China. Since August 2022, he is the current Chinese Ambassador to Peru.

== Career ==
In 1990, he joined the Ministry of Foreign Affairs of the People's Republic of China and worked successively in the Embassy in Angola, the Western European Department of the Ministry of Foreign Affairs, the Macau Liaison Office, the Office of the Commissioner of the Ministry of Foreign Affairs in the Macau Special Administrative Region and the Embassy in Brazil. He has also served in the Policy Research Department, the Policy Planning Department, and the General Office of the Ministry of Foreign Affairs. In 2012, he served as deputy secretary of the Party Committee of the Ministry of Foreign Affairs (deputy director of the Overseas Affairs Bureau). In December 2013, he served as the Consul General of the People's Republic of China in Rio de Janeiro. In October 2016, he served as the Consul General of the People's Republic of China in São Paulo. In 2017, he served as Minister of the Embassy in Brazil. In 2021, he was appointed as Minister of the Latin America and Caribbean Department of the Ministry of Foreign Affairs. Since August 2022, he serves as the Chinese Ambassador to Peru.

Preceded by Liang Yu	Chinese Ambassador to Peru; August 2022–present	Succeeded by Incumbent
Preceded by Chen Xi	Consul General in São Paulo; October 2016–June 2017	Succeeded by Chen Peijie
Preceded by Chen Xiaoling	Consul General in Rio de Janeiro; December 2013–September 2016	Succeeded by Li Yang
