= Liang Yu (activist) =

Chinese women's rights advocate

Liang Yu (Chinese: 梁钰) is a women's rights advocate in China. She gained attention after providing supplies of sanitary pads for female doctors and nurses in Wuhan during the COVID-19 pandemic. As a social media influencer, she is involved with feminist movements in China.

== Reassurance for Sisters Fighting the Virus ==
=== Background ===
During the initial stage of the COVID-19 pandemic in Wuhan, China, in late January 2020, the Chinese government implemented the lockdowns of Wuhan and other affected cities as a pandemic control measure. Though daily necessities donated from home and abroad had been shipped to those cities, the shortage of sanitary pads went largely unnoticed. By contrast, according to the National Health Commission in China, at least 11,921 medics were sent to Hubei to fight the virus, at least half of which were women. As a result, helping female medics became imperative.

=== Liang Yu's contribution ===
Though the lockdown of cities successfully prevented the spread of the virus, it also caused a severe shortage of medical supplies. Due to a shortage of single-use protective suits, most medics in Wuhan had to wear the same suit for eight hours without eating and resting. As a result, Liang Yu wondered whether female medics on their periods also faced the shortage of sanitary pads. After contacting several female medical workers in Wuhan, Liang Yu realized the severe shortage of female sanitary products and decided to take action.

Liang Yu started donating sanitary pads by herself on February 7, 2020, but she soon realized that her donations were only a drop in the bucket. Therefore, on February 10, she launched an online campaign named "Reassurance for Sisters Fighting the Virus", which called attention from the public for the need for sanitary pads in Hubei. On February 11, her team started donating sanitary pads to hospitals in need. Until February 12, over 140 hospitals reached out to Liang Yu for help. The initiative soon became a trending topic on Weibo, a main social media in China. As more and more people realized the basic need for female medical workers fighting the virus in the front line, donations from the public flooded in.

Along with many volunteers, Liang Yu formed an online platform to coordinate those donations from the public. With the Lingshan Charity Foundation's help, Liang's team raised over $325,000 USD within two days, which was able to purchase 200,000 sanitary pads and 300,000 pairs of underwear. Liang's team also helped coordinate donations of sanitary products, including 190,000 menstrual pads from individuals, groups, and companies. In the end, these donations have reached 37 hospitals in Hubei.

== Menstrual Pad Mutual Help Box ==
=== Summary ===
On October 1, 2020, a Chinese middle school teacher put a box of sanitary pads in the classroom. On October 14, Liang Yu posted a picture of this box on Weibo and gained public attention. A week later, inspired by this idea, Xu Luming, a sophomore at East China University of Politics and Law, put a menstrual pad mutual help box aid box outside four bathrooms in the teaching building. As a result, more and more menstrual pad mutual help boxes appeared on the university campuses in China, creating a national movement. In December 8, the menstrual pad mutual help box movement had spread to over 428 schools in China.

=== Goals ===
The movement aimed to help those whose menstruation comes suddenly and break the "menstruation shame" that is widespread in China. Moreover, the Menstrual Pad Mutual Help Box movement helped to establish the concept of mutual help between women and encourage more girls to care for each other.

== Stand by Her Art Exhibition ==
=== Background ===
With feminism gaining more and more attention from the public, there have been many discussions on social media about problems women face in domestic and workplace fields. To help raise awareness of these issues, Liang Yu and Zhu Yujie (a Chinese author) held an art exhibition focusing on female exploration and expression in Shanghai, China. The exhibition includes paintings, sculptures, installations, photography and performances by 12 female artists.

=== Contents ===
==== The Light of Gaia ====
This show, performed by He Yu, takes place in a dark, silent room. Lying on the floor, she puts a pair of lit candles on her breasts. The audience members then walk to her to light their candles. The faint candlelight gathers together, illuminating the entire room. This performance is meant to be a tribute to Gaia, the mother of all life in Greek mythology.

==== A Room of One's Own ====
This installation, created by Chen Xin, focuses on contemporary feminism spread over the internet. It allows visitors to write down their feelings and then collects these notes into a nearby black box with the label "Silence".

==== Woman Series: IUD ====
This artwork collects over 300 handmade IUDs, showing the sacrifices of women in China due to the one-child policy.
