= Hsu Shu-hsi =

Chinese diplomat (1892–1982)

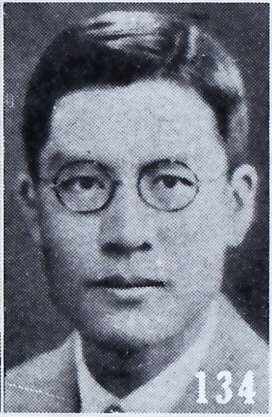
- Born: April 3, 1892; Swatow, China
- Died: January 14, 1982 (aged 89); Westfield, New Jersey, U.S.
- Education: University of Hong Kong
- Political party: Kuomintang
- Awards: Order of the Sun

Hsu Shu-hsi (Chinese: 徐淑希; pinyin: Xú Shūxī; April 3, 1892 – January 14, 1982) was a diplomat of the Republic of China. He represented his country in Canada, Peru and Bolivia.

== Biography ==
Hsu was born in Swatow, the son and grandson of physicians. After graduating from Shantou Huaying Middle School in 1910, he studied at the University of Hong Kong. He later studied at Columbia University in the United States and received a doctorate. After returning to China, he taught at Yenching University and served as dean of the Department of Political Science, dean of the School of Social Sciences, and dean of the Law School.

From 1940, he served as deputy representative of China on the Council of the League of Nations, and in June 1942, acting director of the Asia and Western Affairs Department of the Ministry of Foreign Affairs. With the Chinese Civil War having concluded in 1949, Hsu followed the Nationalist government's retreat to the island of Taiwan, where he successively served as the Ambassador to Peru and Bolivia, plenipotentiary representative of the island's delegation to the United Nations, and Ambassador to Canada since 1956.

Hsu died at the age of 89 on January 14, 1982, at his home in Westfield, New Jersey. He was survived by his wife, Grace Wen-chung Liu—who he married in a ceremony held in 1921 at the Chongwenmen and officiated by John Leighton Stuart—his three sons: Yuan-yo, Fu-cheng Richard, and Charles Chi-chang, and four grandchildren.
