= Zhang Wenjin =

Chinese politician (1914–1991)

Zhang Wenjin (Chinese: 章文晉; 13 July 1914 – 18 February 1991) was a Chinese Deputy Foreign Minister and Ambassador to the United States and Canada.

Zhang participated in historic meetings including Henry Kissinger's secret talks with China's Prime Minister Zhou Enlai in 1971, Zhou's meeting with US President Richard Nixon in 1972, and the Paris peace talks on Vietnam in 1973.

When Kissinger came to China in 1971 as the first step in normalizing relations, Zhang was the Foreign Ministry's senior official in charge of relations with the West.

Zhang's death was reported by the China Central Television, and the cause was not specified.
