= List of ambassadors of China to Mexico =

The Chinese ambassador to Mexico is the official representative of the People's Republic of China to Mexico.

== List of representatives ==
Name (English)	Name (Chinese)	Tenure begins	Tenure ends	Note
Li Shanyi	李善一	May 1972	August 1972	
Xiong Xianghui	熊向晖	8 April 1972	28 August 1973	
Yao Guang	姚广	September 1973	3 May 1977	
Liu Pu	刘溥	August 1977	December 1980	
Wang Ze	王泽	July 1981	16 October 1982	
Li Chao	李超	August 1983	April 1987	
Shi Chunlai	石春来	May 1987	July 1990	
Huang Shikang	黄士康	September 1990	20 May 1994	
Zhang Shaying	张沙鹰	August 1994	January 1996	
Shen Yunao	沈允熬	March 1996	March 2001	
Li Jinzhang	李金章	March 2001	June 2003	
Ren Jingyu	任景玉	September 2003	February 2007	
Yin Hengmin	殷恒民	February 2007	December 2010	
Zeng Gang	曾钢	January 2011	August 2013	
Qiu Xiaoqi	邱小琪	August 2013	April 2019	
Zhu Qingqiao	祝青桥	May 2019		

== See also ==
- China–Mexico relations
