= List of ambassadors of China to Brazil =

Ambassador of China to Brazil
- Embaixador da China no Brasil 中华人民共和国 驻巴西联邦共和国特命全权大使
- National emblem of China

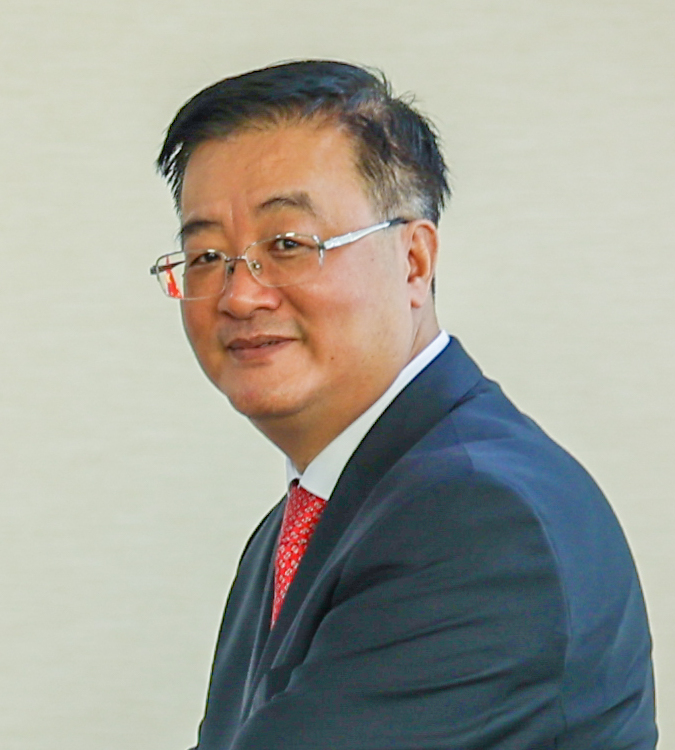
- Incumbent; Zhu Qingqiao since 8 December 2022
- Ministry of Foreign Affairs
- Style: Mr. Ambassador (informal); His Excellency (diplomatic)
- Reports to: Minister of Foreign Affairs
- Seat: SES 813; Av. das Nações, Quadra 813, Lote 52; 70443-900; Brasília
- Appointer: The president pursuant to a National People's Congress Standing Committee decision
- Term length: No fixed term
- Formation: 18 December 1974; 51 years ago
- First holder: Wang Benzou as Chargé d'Affaires ad interim
- Website: Embassy of China in Brasília

The ambassador of China to Brazil is the official representative of the People's Republic of China to Brazil.

== List of representatives ==
Name (English)	Name (Chinese)	Tenure begins	Tenure ends	Note
Wang Benzuo	王本祚	December 1974	May 1975	
Zhang Dequn	张德群	May 1975	January 1982	
Xu Zhongfu	徐中夫	May 1982	June 1985	
Tao Dazhao	陶大钊	August 1985	August 1988	
Shen Yun'ao	沈允熬	September 1988	December 1993	
Yuan Tao	原焘	March 1994	December 1995	
Li Guoxin	李国新	February 1996	April 2000	
Wan Yongxiang	万永祥	May 2000	August 2002	
Jiang Yuande	蒋元德	September 2002	March 2006	
Chen Duqing	陈笃庆	April 2006	February 2009	
Qiu Xiaoqi	邱小琪	March 2009	December 2011	
Li Jinzhang	李金章	January 2012	December 2018	
Yang Wanming	杨万明	December 2018	March 2022	
Zhu Qingqiao	祝青桥	December 2022	Present	

== See also ==
- China–Brazil relations
