= Tsui Kwo Yin =

Chinese diplomat

Tsui Kwo Yin (Traditional Chinese: 崔國因; Simplified Chinese: 崔国因; Hanyu Pinyin: Cuī Guóyīn) (17 April 1831 – 9 May 1908) was the Chinese Minister to the United States, Spain, and Peru from 1889 to 1893. Cui was born in what is today Huangshan City, Anhui Province. The details of his life are not well known beyond a diary that he wrote chronicling his time as Minister.

Liang Jian, a historian at Yunnan Normal University, writes that "Cui Guoyin was the fourth minister sent by the Qing Dynasty to the United States. Under the difficult circumstances of a weak country and the strong anti-Chinese sentiment in the US government and the opposition, he negotiated several times for the US Anti-Chinese Act, protested the discrimination of the US government against Chinese expatriates, and safeguarded the legitimate rights and interests of Chinese expatriates; he tried his best to prevent Senator Blair, who had strong anti-Chinese tendencies, from serving as minister to China; and he advocated that Chinese expatriates in the United States take root and become American citizens.". Historian Michael Hunt believes that Cui was "a lackluster diplomat", because he did not consistently advocate for concrete policies that would assist Chinese citizens living in the United States following the Chinese Exclusion Act of 1882.

His uncle, Cui Zhou(崔洲), was a politician and commanding officer, and his son, Cui Youzhen(崔由楨), was a mob leader and politician.
