= Embassy of China, Lima =

Chinese diplomatic mission in Peru

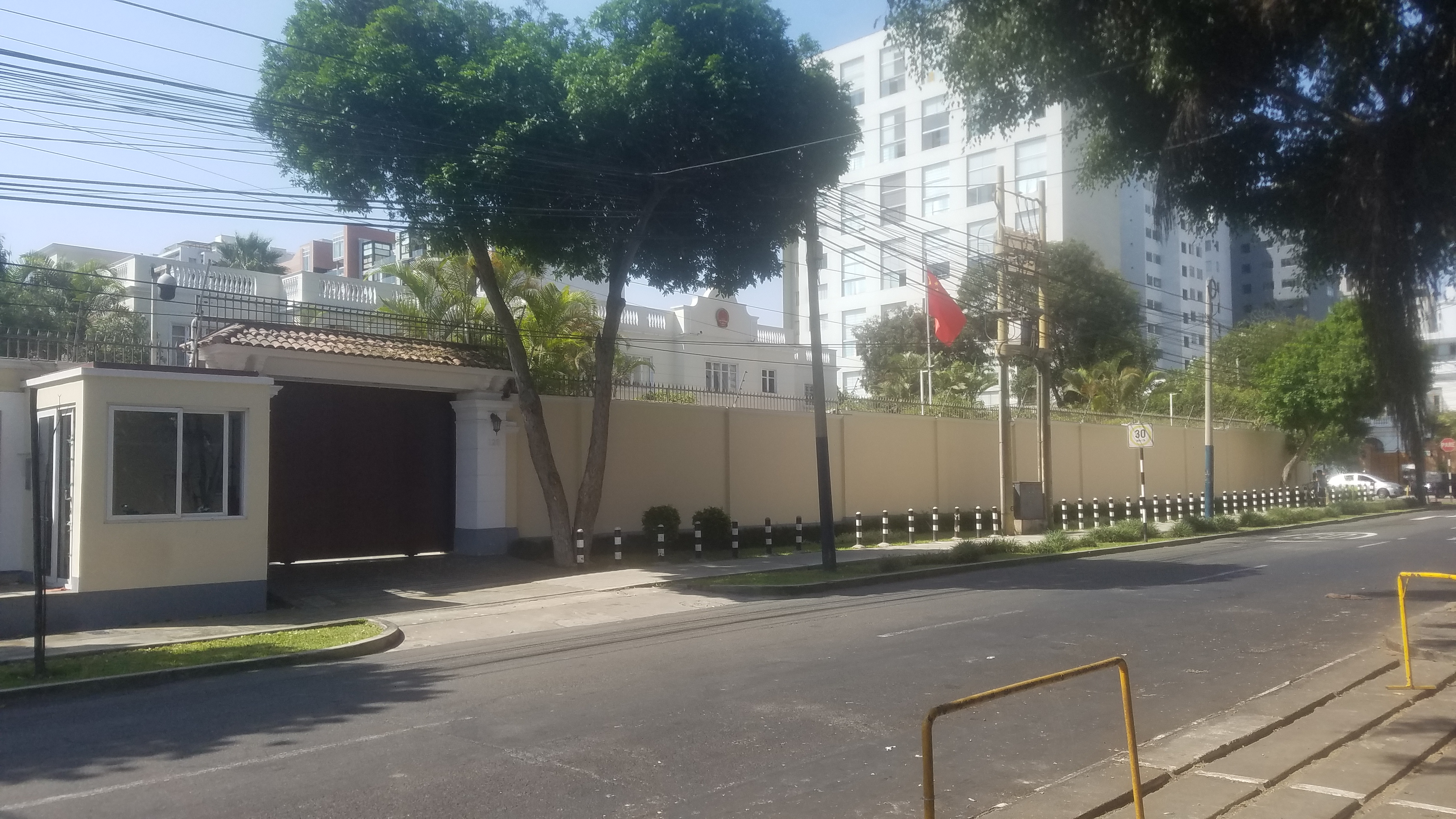
- Location: San Isidro, Lima, Peru
- Address: Jr. José Granda 150
- Opening: February 1972
- Ambassador: Song Yang
- Website: Official website

The Embassy of the People's Republic of China in Peru (Note: Chinese: 中华人民共和国驻秘鲁共和国大使馆; pinyin: Zhōnghuá rénmín gònghéguó zhù bìlǔ gònghéguó dàshǐ guǎn; Spanish: Embajada de la República Popular China en la República del Perú) is the diplomatic mission of the People's Republic of China to Peru. The embassy is serviced by the Chinese ambassador to Peru.

== History ==
The embassy opened in February 1972, one year after the military government of Juan Velasco Alvarado recognized the People's Republic of China instead of the Republic of China as the sole government of China. The Taiwanese government only opened a representative office six years after the closure of its embassy, in 1978.

The embassy's opening was met with festivities organised by pro-Beijing committees, who welcomed the new Chinese ambassador upon his arrival at Jorge Chávez International Airport in numbers that reached up to 500 people. At the time, however, many Chinese Peruvians identified with the Nationalist government in Taipei, which caused a division in the community that faded in the following decades.

In 1985, during the internal conflict in Peru, the embassy was bombed alongside the Soviet and U.S. embassies. The attacks were carried out with dynamite, with the attack on the Chinese embassy destroying its front door. The embassy was again attacked in 1989. In 2000, the embassy was relocated to San Isidro. On January 25, 2023, the building's main entrance was blocked by protestors as part of a series of protests by supporters of former president Pedro Castillo.

=== Residence ===
The ambassador's residence is located within the embassy's grounds, located at 183 Parque Javier Prado street, which faces Alfonso Ugarte Park.

== See also ==
- China–Peru relations
- Taipei Economic and Cultural Office in Peru

== Bibliography ==
- Zhang, Xiaoxu (2022-09-19). "La identidad política de los inmigrantes chinos en el Perú con su país de origen: a principios de la década 1970s". Ibero-América Studies. 4 (2): 30–38. doi:10.55704/ias.v4i2.04. S2CID 252402046.
