= Vanessa Lawrence =

British geographer

Vanessa Lawrence CB FRGS FRICS FRSGS
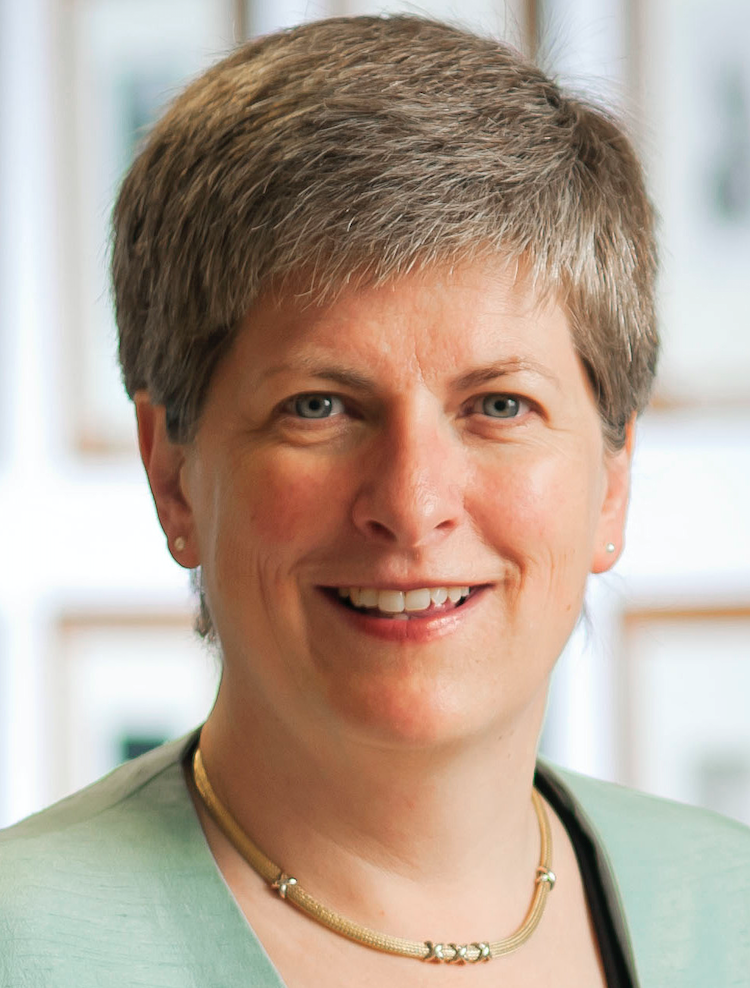

Global Advisor for Geospatial Information to the World Bank Group
- Incumbent
- Assumed office 2015
- President: Ajay Banga; David Malpass; Kristalina Georgieva (Acting); Jim Yong Kim

1st Co-chair of the United Nations Committee of Experts on Global Geospatial Information Management (UN-GGIM)
- In office 2011–2015
- Under Secretary-General: Wu Hongbo; Sha Zukang

Director-General and Chief Executive, Ordnance Survey
- In office 2000 – April 2014
- Preceded by: David Willey
- Succeeded by: Neil Ackroyd

Personal details
- Born: 14 July 1962 (age 64) Amersham, Buckinghamshire
- Occupation: Geographer

- Vanessa Vivienne Lawrence CB HonFREng FRGS FRICS FRSGS CCMI (born 14 July 1962) is a British businessperson, geographer and speaker working internationally.

For 14 years, until April 2014, she was Director-General and Chief Executive of Ordnance Survey, Great Britain's national mapping agency. She was the first woman to hold the post and at the time of her departure had held the Director General role longer than any predecessor in more than a century.

In 2015 Lawrence was appointed Global advisor for geospatial information to the World Bank Group.

The same year, she was also appointed as a Non-Executive Director of the Satellite Applications Catapult Ltd, a Director of Location International, a Location Global Ltd Company and a Member of the Advisory Groups of the Urban Big Data Centre, Seraphim Space LLP, the Space Venture Capital Fund backed by the British Business Bank and Spatial Finance Initiative.

== Biography ==
In January 2008 Lawrence was invested as a Companion of The Most Honourable Order of the Bath (CB) in the New Year Honours List. She has been elected an Honorary Fellow of the Institution of Civil Engineering Surveyors and of the Royal Academy of Engineering. She is also a Fellow of the Royal Institution of Chartered Surveyors, a Companion of the Chartered Management Institute, a Fellow of the Royal Geographical Society, an Honorary Fellow of the Royal Scottish Geographical Society and a Chartered Geographer.

During her career with government she served as the co-founder and inaugural chair of Association of Chief Executives (ACE) which represented the CEOs of Government Agencies, Trading Funds and Non-Departmental Bodies, was the Chair of the Geographic Information Panel that produced the Location Strategy of the United Kingdom known as Place Matters: the Location Strategy for the United Kingdom and was a Non-Executive Director of the Office of the Deputy Prime Minister and the Open Geospatial Consortium

Prior to working in government, she was employed by Autodesk and by Pearson plc in the Longman Group.

She has been awarded the Royal Scottish Geographical Society, Scottish Geographical Medal for conspicuous merit and world-wide repute, the Institute of Directors South-East Director of the Year Award in 2008 and was made the Geospatial Person of the Decade 2000-2010

In 2008 she joined the Council of the University of Cambridge for four and a half years having served on the Council of the University of Southampton from 2001 to 2008.

In 2011 the United Nations elected Lawrence to serve as the inaugural co-chair of its Committee of Experts on Global Geospatial Information Management (UN-GGIM). She served in this role continuously for four years working with others to develop UN-GGIM to be the lead global authority for governments and the private sector in geographic Information. On leaving UN-GGIM after four years, she was awarded a Certificate of Appreciation by the Under-Secretary-General, Dr Wu Hongbo The text of the Certificate read as follows:

"The deep appreciation, respect and gratitude of the United Nations Committee of Experts on Global Geospatial Information Management (UN-GGIM) is presented to Dr. Vanessa V. Lawrence CB. On behalf of all UN Member States, the Committee of Experts appreciates the considerable leadership and dedication of time and effort you have given to promote, shape and guide UN-GGIM since its establishment by the Economic and Social Council of the United Nations (ECOSOC) in 2011. As the inaugural Co-Chair of the Committee of Experts from 2011–2015, your global knowledge and expertise has ensured that significant progress has been made towards achieving the Committee's mandated objectives. Through your leadership the international community has made important progress towards recognising the essential role of geospatial information in global development. With grateful thanks."

In 2020 she was appointed as a Non-Executive Director and Trustee of the Alan Turing Institute for Data Science and AI and a Board Member of the Walker Institute for interdisciplinary Climate Science, University of Reading. In April 2026, the Alan Turing Institute announced that she would serve as interim chair of the board after the former chair Doug Gurr stepped down.

She remains the Honorary Colonel, 135 Geographic Squadron Royal Engineers, and an Honorary Group Captain in 601 Squadron, Royal Auxiliary Air Force, an adjunct professor at the University of Southampton, a Trustee of the Royal Geographical Society and a Patron of The Cure Parkinson's Trust and MapAction.

== See also ==
- United Nations Committee of Experts on Global Geospatial Information Management
- Wu Hongbo
- Ordnance Survey
- Manuel Ntumba

Government offices
Preceded by David Willey	Director-General of the Ordnance Survey; 2000–April 2014	Succeeded by Neil Ackroyd
