= Shi Mingde (diplomat) =

Chinese diplomat (born 1954)

- 史明德
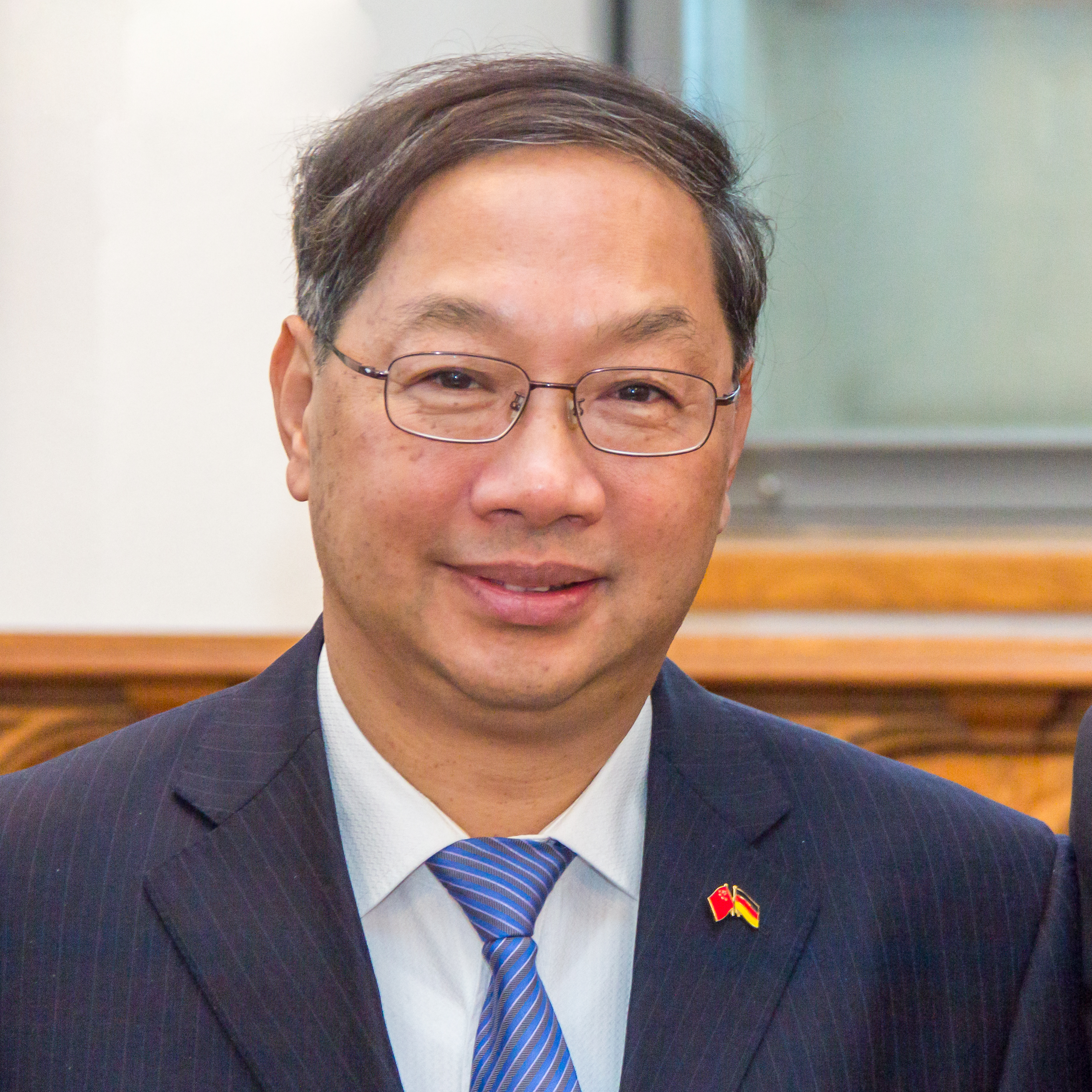
- Shi in January 2016

Chinese Ambassador to Germany
- In office August 2012 – February 2019
- Preceded by: Wu Hongbo
- Succeeded by: Wu Ken

Chinese Ambassador to Austria
- In office August 2010 – August 2012
- Preceded by: Wu Ken
- Succeeded by: Zhao Bin

Personal details
- Born: December 1954 (age 71) Shanghai, China
- Party: Chinese Communist Party
- Spouse: Xu Jinghua
- Children: 1
- Education: Beijing Foreign Studies University

Shi Mingde (Chinese: 史明德; pinyin: Shǐ Míngdé; born December 1954) is a Chinese diplomat who served as Chinese Ambassadors to Austria from 2010 to 2012 and Chinese Ambassadors to Germany from 2012 to 2019.

== Biography ==
Shi was born in Shanghai, in December 1954. In 1972, he was sent to study at the East German Embassy International Student Class.

After graduating in 1975, he worked at there until 1981, when he became a staff member of the Beijing Diplomatic Service Bureau. In 1986, he was sent to the East Germany again and appointed a secretary. Shi returned to China in 1990 and was assigned to the Department of West European Affairs, Ministry of Foreign Affairs. In 1993, he was made a counsellor of the Chinese Embassy in Germany. In 1997, he was recalled to the Department of West European Affairs and was elevated to deputy director. In 2002, he became counsellor of the Chinese Embassy in Germany for the second time. In 2006, he took office as director of the Policy Research Bureau of the Central Foreign Affairs Office. He was designated by President Hu Jintao in August 2010 to replace Wu Ken as Chinese Ambassadors to Austria according the 11th National People's Congress decision. In August 2012, President Hu Jintao named him Chinese Ambassadors to Germany according the 11th National People's Congress decision, and he held this post from 2012 until 2019.

== Personal life ==
Shi is married and has a son. His wife Xu Jinghua (徐静华) is a German language translator.

Diplomatic posts
Preceded by Wu Ken	Chinese Ambassadors to Austria; 2010–2012	Succeeded by Zhao Bin
Preceded by Wu Hongbo	Chinese Ambassadors to Germany; 2012–2019	Succeeded by Wu Ken
