= Chen Xu (diplomat) =

Chinese diplomat

- 陈旭
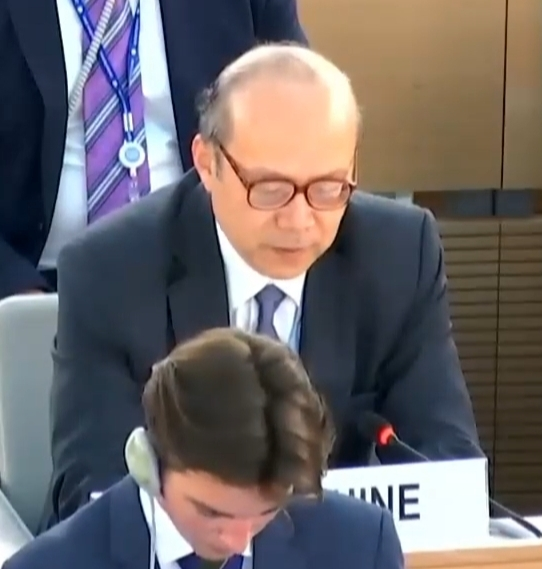
- Chen Xu at the UNHRC in 2023

Permanent Representative of China to the United Nations Office at Geneva and Other International Organizations in Switzerland
- In office 2019–2025
- Preceded by: Yu Jianhua
- Succeeded by: Jia Guide

Director of the Department of European Affairs of the Ministry of Foreign Affairs of the People's Republic of China
- In office 2016–2019
- Preceded by: Liu Haixing
- Succeeded by: Wang Lutong

Chinese Ambassador to the Netherlands
- In office April 2013 – April 2016
- Preceded by: Zhang Jun
- Succeeded by: Wu Ken

Personal details
- Born: February 1962 (age 64) Yanggu County, Shandong, China
- Party: Chinese Communist Party
- Children: 1
- Education: Fudan University; China Foreign Affairs University

Chinese name
- Simplified Chinese: 陈旭
- Traditional Chinese: 陳旭
Transcriptions
Standard Mandarin
- Hanyu Pinyin: Chén Xù

Chen Xu (Chinese: 陈旭; born February 1962) is a Chinese diplomat who was the permanent representative of China to the United Nations Office at Geneva and Other International Organizations in Switzerland, in office from 2019 to 2025. He was previously the director of the Department of European Affairs of the Ministry of Foreign Affairs of the People's Republic of China and before that, Chinese ambassador to the Netherlands.

== Biography ==
Born in Yanggu County, Shandong in February 1962, Chen graduated from Fudan University and China Foreign Affairs University.

Chen worked in the International Department of the Ministry of Foreign Affairs of the People's Republic of China after university in 1985. In 1988, he became a member of the Permanent Mission of the People's Republic of China to the United Nations. He was recalled to the original International Department in 1992. In 1998, he became a counsellor of the Permanent Mission of the People's Republic of China to the United Nations.

Chen returned to China in 2003 and that same year became deputy director of the Foreign Affairs Office of the People's Government of Xinjiang Uygur Autonomous Region. In 2004, he became deputy director of the International Department of the Ministry of Foreign Affairs, rising to director in 2010.

He was designated by President Xi Jinping in 2013 to replace Zhang Jun as Chinese Ambassador to the Netherlands.

He was director of the Department of European Affairs of the Ministry of Foreign Affairs in May 2016, and held that office until 2019.

In 2019, he was appointed permanent representative of China to the United Nations Office at Geneva and Other International Organizations in Switzerland, succeeding Yu Jianhua. He was appointed as a member of the 14th National Committee of the Chinese People's Political Consultative Conference on 17 January 2023 from the Friendship with Foreign Countries Sector. On November 12, 2025, he made a farewell call to Director General Tatiana Valovaya of the United Nations Office at Geneva, effectively ending his role as permanent representative of China to the UN Office at Geneva and Other International Organizations in Switzerland.

== Personal life ==
Chen is married and has a son.

Diplomatic posts
Preceded by Zhang Jun	Chinese Ambassador to the Netherlands; 2013–2016	Succeeded by Wu Ken
Preceded by Yu Jianhua	Permanent Representative of China to the United Nations Office at Geneva and Other International Organizations in Switzerland; 2019–2025	Succeeded by Jia Guide
Government offices
Preceded by Liu Haixing	Director of the Department of European Affairs of the Ministry of Foreign Affairs of the People's Republic of China; 2016–2019	Succeeded by Wang Lutong
