= Embassy of China, Berlin =

Embassy of the People's Republic of China in the Federal Republic of Germany 中华人民共和国驻德意志联邦共和国大使馆
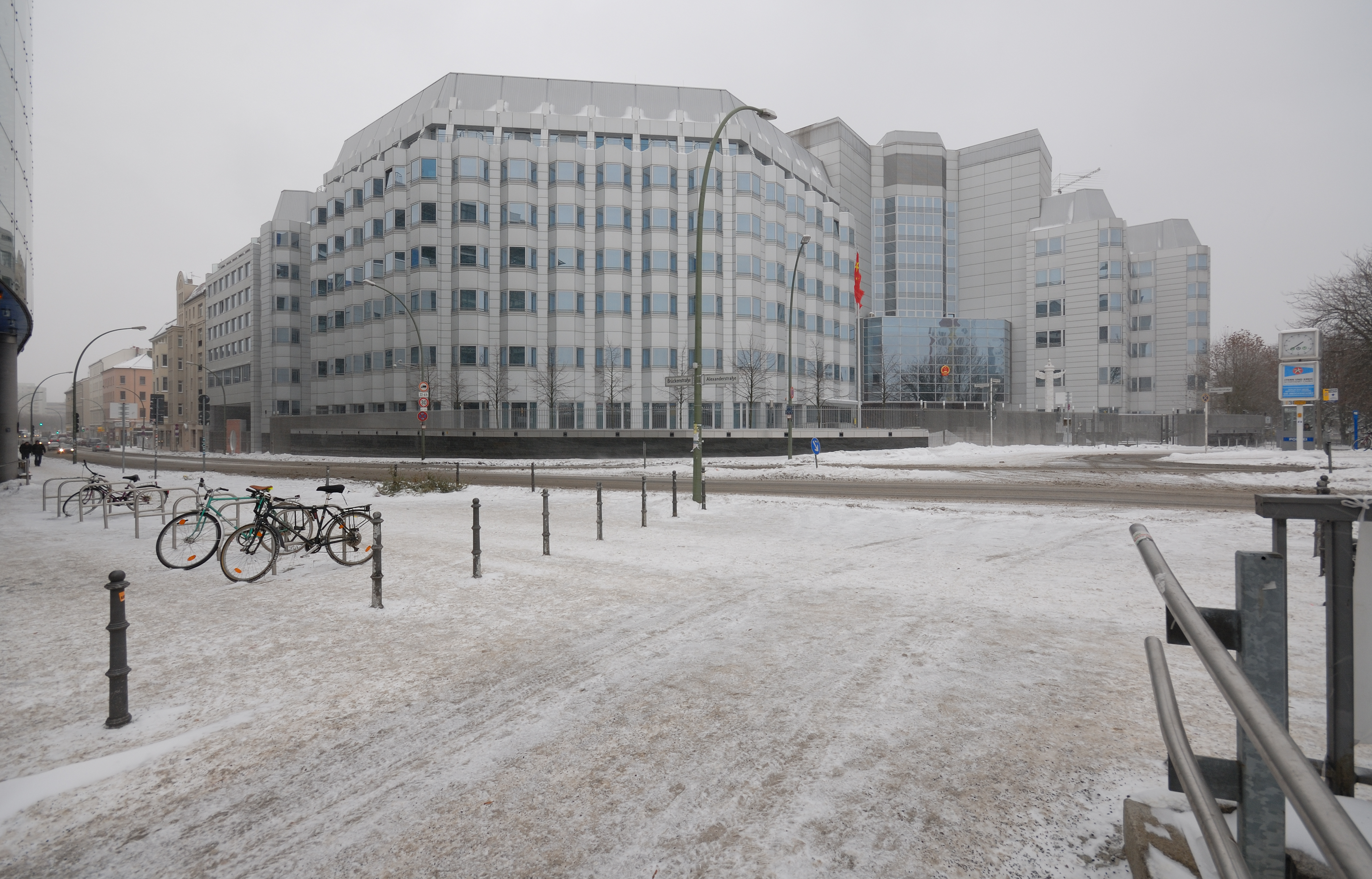
- The Embassy building in Berlin
- Location: Berlin, Germany
- Address: Märkisches Ufer 54, Luisenstadt, Mitte, Berlin
- Coordinates: 52°30′48″N 13°25′2″E
- Opened: 1877; 149 years ago
- Ambassador: Deng Hongbo; since 2024
- Jurisdiction: Federal Foreign Office
- Website: de.china-embassy.gov.cn

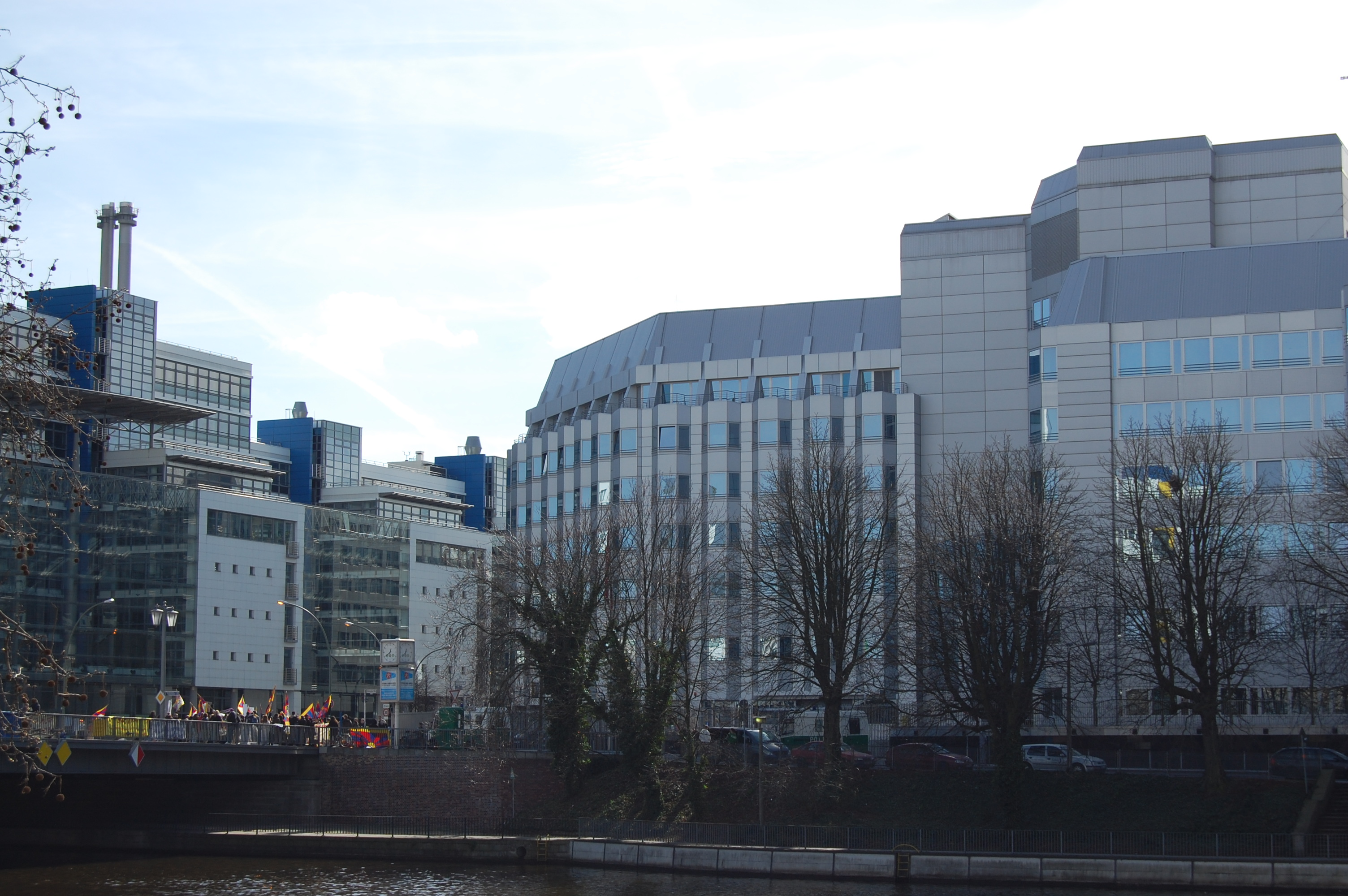
Chinese embassy building at the Jannowitz Bridge

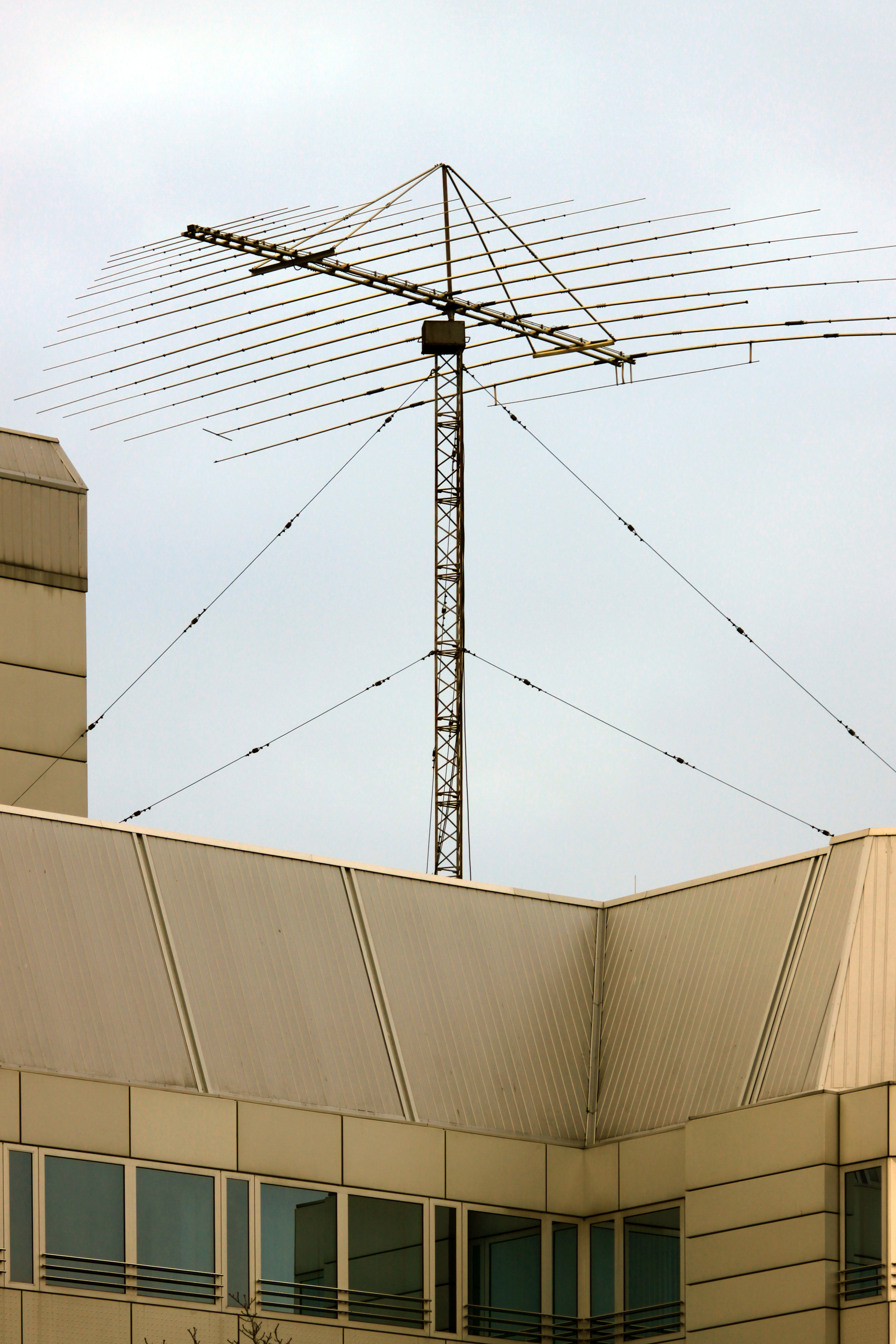
Shortwave antenna on the embassy building, January 2009

The Chinese Embassy in Berlin, officially the Embassy of the People's Republic of China in the Federal Republic of Germany (German: Botschaft der Volksrepublik China in der Bundesrepublik Deutschland; Chinese: 中华人民共和国驻德意志联邦共和国大使馆) is the head of the diplomatic mission of the People's Republic of China in Germany. China has had a diplomatic mission in Berlin since 1877. The current embassy is located at Märkisches Ufer 54 near the Jannowitz Bridge in Luisenstadt in Berlin-Mitte. The seven-storey building, built in 1988 as the FDGB headquarter, was rebuilt from 1999 to 2001 to the present-day embassy.

== History ==
=== Imperial legation in Berlin (1877–1911) ===
The Imperial legation in Berlin was established in 1877 by the Qing dynasty. The first envoy was Liu Xihong. From 1878 to 1890, the legation rented Baron August von der Heydt's villa in the Tiergarten district for an annual rent of 15,000 German marks. In 1889, Theodor Fontane wrote the essay “Auf der Suche. Spaziergang am Berliner Kanal” (“In Search of Something: A Walk Along the Berlin Canal”) about children playing at the wall of the Chinese legation; however, the fact that the children are being given apples by a Chinese man, as reported by Gütinger, does not correspond to the essay, but to a drawing by Arthur Wanjura, a book illustrator; his picture was published in 1887 in issue 22 of the magazine “Das Buch für Alle” (“The book for everyone”), together with other Chinese impressions and may have inspired Fontane.

In 1890, after the banker Karl von der Heydt bought the villa and claimed it as his residence, the Chinese legation moved to In den Zelten No. 14, a street that was, after 1945, incorporated in the area of what later became the Congress Hall. In 1902, Chinese General Yin Tschang was his country's envoy to the legation.

In 1910, China acquired a house at Kurfürstendamm 218 and established its legation there. The building at Kurfürstendamm 218 was mortgaged by the Chinese envoy in 1913 after the end of the Qing dynasty in order to be able to make payments for Chinese nationals stranded in Germany.

=== Diplomatic Mission of the Republic of China (1919–1949) ===
During the Weimar Republic, the legation of the Republic of China remained at Kurfürstendamm 218. In 1921, a consulate general was established in Hamburg. In 1938, the Hamburg consulate general opened a short-lived office in Bremen. In the same year, in the wake of the Anschluss, the Chinese embassy in Vienna was converted into a consulate general. He Fengshan remained in Austria as consul general. On 18 May 1935, China converted the legation in Berlin into an embassy. From autumn 1940, Lieutenant General Gui Yongqing was military attaché in Berlin. In response to the recognition of the Wang Jingwei regime on 2 July 1941, the Republic of China broke off relations with Germany and declared war on Berlin on 9 December 1941.

=== Manchukuo Legation (1938–1945) ===
Since June 1936, a trade commissioner from Manchukuo, a puppet state founded in 1932 by the colonial power Japan on Chinese territory, had been residing in Berlin. On 20 February 1938, Hitler announced the recognition of Manchukuo in a speech to the Reichstag, linking it to Germany's withdrawal from the League of Nations in 1933. However, until the end of its existence in 1945, Manchukuo was only recognised internationally by a few states – mainly the Axis powers and their allies.

On 12 May 1938, Germany and Manchukuo signed a friendship treaty, and on 16 August, Lü Yiwén was appointed as the first chargé d'affaires (with the rank of ambassador) of the Manchukuo legation. After Lü's arrival in November, the legation announced that same month that a consulate general had been established in Hamburg. This was followed by secondary accreditation for Hungary in 1939 and Romania in 1940. Lü was the former governor of Tonghua District and, prior to his appointment, had worked in Manchukuo's Foreign Ministry in Changchun and as secretary to Prime Minister Zhang Jinghui. On 21 November 1938, he presented his credentials to Hitler at the Berghof together with four envoys from other states. The Manchurian legation was located at Lessingstraße 1 in the Hansaviertel district. While the envoy in Berlin, Lü Yiwen, and the consul general in Hamburg, An Chi-Yun, were ethnic Chinese, the majority of the remaining staff of the mission were from Japan, for example, the trade commissioner in Berlin, Hiyoshi Kato (Japanese: 加藤 日吉, Katō Hiyoshi), who had already been active in the run-up to diplomatic recognition, and the vice-consul in Hamburg, Seiroku Sawaguchi.

After 1941, the legation's activities declined. On the one hand, since the summer, the official representatives of the Republic of China under Chiang Kai-shek and Manchukuo's most important opponents were no longer present as competitors on the diplomatic stage. On the other hand, the war in Europe limited the opportunities to promote the Manchukuo project to the public. Nevertheless, in 1942, the tenth anniversary of Manchukuo was celebrated with a concert. The conductor was Ahn Eak-tai, who later composed the national anthem of South Korea.

=== Embassy of the PRC in the GDR (1950–1990) ===
The German Democratic Republic and the People's Republic of China established diplomatic relations on 25 October 1949, shortly after the founding of the GDR. In 1950, the first Chinese ambassador, Ji Pengfei, took up his post in East Berlin. After his diplomatic career, Ji Pengfei became Foreign Minister of the People's Republic. The Chinese mission arrived at Schlesischer Bahnhof station on 11 October 1950. Their journey on the Trans-Siberian Railway had taken them via Moscow. The following day, Ji Pengfei presented his credentials to GDR President Wilhelm Pieck.

In 1951, the embassy was located at Treskowallee 77 in Berlin-Karlshorst (renamed Hermann-Duncker-Straße in 1961 and renumbered to No. 92), and from 1952 to 1973 at Treskowallee 50 (renumbered to No. 26 in 1961). The prestigious building became the representative office of the Libyan Jamahiriya from 1983 to 1989. In 1973, China was given a villa at Heinrich-Mann-Straße 9 in Niederschönhausen, Pankow district, as its new domicile.

In the aftermath of the bloody suppression of the protests in Tiananmen Square on 5 June 1989, the confrontation between opposition groups and the GDR leadership came to a head. The approval of the Chinese leadership's actions signalled by the SED leadership in the official GDR media was seen as an attempt to intimidate the GDR opposition. In June 1989, several unauthorised protest demonstrations took place in front of the Chinese embassy in Niederschönhausen, an extremely rare event in the history of the GDR. The demonstration on 21 June 1989, during which around fifty participants were arrested, attracted particular attention. On the same day, 25 opposition groups issued a joint protest statement, which was sent to the Chinese ambassador.

=== Embassy of the PRC in the FRG (1973–1990) ===
On 11 October 1972, the Federal Republic of Germany, represented by Foreign Minister Walter Scheel, and the People's Republic of China, represented by Foreign Minister Ji Pengfei, agreed to establish full diplomatic relations. Ji Pengfei had been the first ambassador of the People's Republic of China to Germany more than 20 years earlier, when he was the first ambassador to the GDR. In 1973, the Embassy of the People's Republic of China opened in Niederbachem near Bonn.

From 1984 onwards, the embassy was located at Kurfürstenallee 12 in Bonn-Bad Godesberg. After the Decision on the Capital of Germany, the Chinese embassy moved to Berlin and the building in Bonn became a consulate. In 2004, the Chinese government gave up the embassy building on Kurfürstenallee, but it remained in the possession of the People's Republic of China. After renovation, it now serves as a guest house for Chinese diplomats.

== Embassy of the PRC in united Germany ==
The building complex near the Jannowitz Bridge, in use since 1999, was built in 1988 after the plans of Jens Ebert for 182 million marks and was the new seat of the Federal Board of FDGB ("House of Unions"). After Die Wende, it was rebuilt to a congress center ("Berliner Congress Center - BCC"), but soon went out of service. As a result of the Capital Decision in 1991, the Chinese Embassy (in the former West Germany) moved in 1999 from Bonn to Berlin. Both Chinese embassies merged and acquired the congress center. The conversion was carried out according to plans of Novotny Mähner Associated. The building has a silver exterior, decorated with mirrored windows. There is a sculpture of a Chinese guardian lion on the portal.

The Chinese Embassy consists of the following areas:

- Consular department
- Political department
- Department of Press and Public Relations
- Military department
- Culture department
- Department of Science and Technology
- Department of Economics and Trade
- Education Department.

The residence of the Chinese ambassador to Germany is located on Toni-Lessler-Straße in the Grunewald district of Berlin.

In addition to the embassy in Berlin, the People's Republic of China also maintains a branch office in Bonn and consulates general in Düsseldorf, Frankfurt am Main, Hamburg, and Munich.

The Representative Office of the Republic of China (Taiwan) is located on Gendarmenmarkt in Markgrafenstraße in Berlin-Mitte. As the Federal Republic of Germany does not officially recognise the Republic of China due to its One China policy, it does not act as an embassy, but as a permanent representative office.

Since September 2024 the ambassador is Deng Hongbo; his predecessor was Wu Ken.

== See also ==
- List of ambassadors of China to Germany
- China-Germany relations
- Embassy of China, Bonn
- Embassy of Germany, Beijing
