= Manuel Ntumba =

Congolese-Togolese Inventor and Advisor

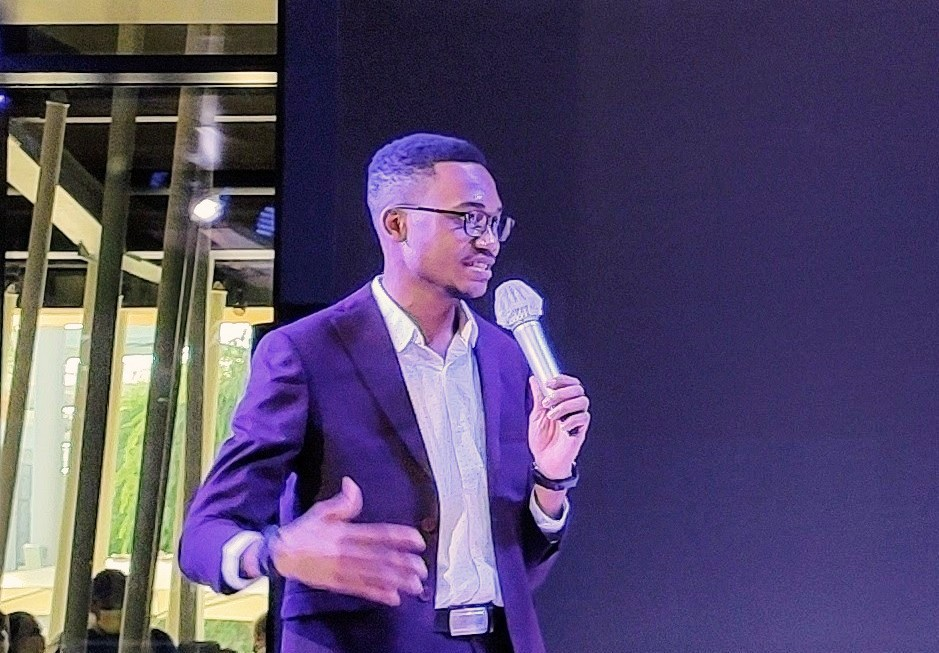
- Manuel Ntumba in 2023

Executive Vice President and Managing Partner of Tod'Aérs Global Network [TGN]
- Incumbent
- Assumed office 01 January 2020
- Governing Board: Igor Lukšić (Chairperson); Piotr Trabinski [fr] (Deputy Chairperson); Pamela Gidi [fr] (Deputy Chairperson); Adriana Marais (Chief Scientist)

Alternate Representative to the Intergovernmental Group on Earth Observations (GEO) - hosted by the World Meteorological Organization (WMO)
- Incumbent
- Assumed office 17 December 2025

Lead Evaluation Expert for the Global Environment Facility (GEF) and the United Nations Environment Programme (UNEP)
- In office November 2024 – April 2026

Advisor and Vice President for West Africa to the UNDRR Private Sector Alliance (ARISE)
- In office 01 January 2024 – 31 December 2024
- Co-chairs: Mahmoud Al-Burai; Terry Kinyua

Advisor to the United Nations Development Programme (UNDP)
- In office 01 July 2023 – 31 December 2023

Member of the Diplomatic Delegation to the United Nations Committee of Experts on Global Geospatial Information Management (UN-GGIM)
- In office 01 June 2022 – 08 September 2023
- Co-chairs: Ingrid Vanden Berghe; Paloma Merodio Gómez; Fernand Bale; Tulu Besha Bedada; (Till August 2022)

Advisor to the 19th Presidential Panel of the African Union (AU) for the mandate 2021-2022
- In office 1 June 2021 – 5 February 2022
- President: Félix Tshisekedi

Personal details
- Relatives: Komla Dodzi Kokoroko [fr]
- Education: Justus Liebig University Giessen (JLU); Universidade Católica Portuguesa (UCP)
- Occupation: Government advisor, geostrategist and inventor
- Awards: Forbes 30 under 30 (2024)

Manuel Ntumba is a Congolese-Togolese inventor, government advisor, and geostrategist. He is the Managing Partner and Executive Vice President of the global public-private partnership Tod'Aérs Global Network [TGN]. Ntumba currently advises governments, intergovernmental organizations, private sectors, multilateral funds and international banks in the strategic planning and the strategic management of multilateral programmes and multinational projects across various sectors.

== Early life and education ==
Ntumba was born to a Congolese father Prof. Shambuyi Ntumba, a University Professor of Business Law from the Democratic Republic of Congo and a Togolese mother. He is the nephew of the current Minister of Environment of Togo Prof. Komla Dodzi Kokoroko [fr], who is also a University Professor of Law. Ntumba graduated in engineering with a specialization in satellite telecommunications and geoinformatics. Since 2022, he is also an Alumni in Public Policy and Management from the Young African Leaders Initiative (YALI), an initiative of the United States Department of State launched in 2010 by President Barack Obama.

Since January 2026, Ntumba pursues a Doctorate’s degree (Ph.D.) in Climate Economics, specializing in Climate Risks, Quantitative Geopolitics, and Financial Markets at Justus Liebig University Giessen (JLU) - under the supervision of Prof. Jürg Luterbacher [de], a former Chief Scientist of the World Meteorological Organization (WMO) and a Member of the Climate Risks Taskforce of the European Central Bank (ECB). Ntumba also pursues a Doctorate’s degree (Ph.D.) in Political Communications, specializing in Governance, Risk, and Compliance (GRC) at Universidade Católica Portuguesa (UCP).

== Career ==
From 2022 to 2023, Ntumba was appointed as a Member of the diplomatic delegation to the United Nations Committee of Experts on Global Geospatial Information Management (UN-GGIM), within the United Nations Economic and Social Council (ECOSOC). Ntumba served as Advisor to the United Nations Development Programme (UNDP), where, from July 2023 to December 2023, he led a project focused on the planning and monitoring of governance reforms for public institutions.

After successfully leading ascension talks between the Intergovernmental Group on Earth Observations (GEO) - hosted by the World Meteorological Organization (WMO) and the Government of Togo for 3 years (2022-2025), Ntumba was appointed Alternate Representative and Ex officio Chief Technical Advisor after Togo became the 117th Member of GEO on 17 December 2025.

Prior to that, Ntumba served as Lead Evaluation Expert for the Global Environment Facility (GEF) and the United Nations Environment Programme (UNEP), where he led the evaluation of UN donors-funded projects from 2024 to early 2026. Ntumba also served as Advisor and Vice President for West Africa to the UNDRR Private Sector Alliance (ARISE), an initiative launched by the United Nations Office for Disaster Risk Reduction (UNDRR) in 2015 to enable public-private partnerships [PPP] and global collaboration between private sectors, public sectors and other stakeholders; to support the implementation of the Sendai Framework for Disaster Risk Reduction.

From 2023 to 2024, Ntumba also works as Principal Consultant for Airbus Intelligence, a division of Airbus Defence and Space (ADS), where he is in charge of public relations (PR) and communication strategies for the Pléiades Neo satellites in Africa, Latin America, the Caribbean and Asia-Pacific. The Pléiades Neo satellite data and imagery services are delivered to support governments, intergovernmental organizations, policymakers, and private sectors with geospatial intelligence in fields such as geostrategy, technological innovation, socio-economic development.

Ntumba completed an executive-level program in financial technology and digital economy from the International Finance Corporation (World Bank Group) and Alipay (Alibaba Group). Ntumba worked as an Advisor on space affairs and geospatial intelligence to the African Union Presidential Panel for the mandate 2021-2022, previously chaired by Félix Antoine Tshisekedi Tshilombo, President of the Democratic Republic of Congo (DRC) and 19th President of the African Union (2021-2022). Where he worked with the current Congolese Education Minister Raïssa Malu, who was then serving as a Member of the Presidential Panel, to develop a roadmap for the use of space technologies, digital transformation, and geospatial applications to achieve the Agenda 2063 of the African Union (AU).

This led later on to the implementation of the first-ever African Forum on Geospatial and Socio-Economic Progress (AfGSEP Forum) under the theme “Space Technologies for Sustainable Development in Africa”. The forum was organized on the sidelines of the ninth edition of the Science and Technology Week (SST), in collaboration with the UNESCO, the Government of the Democratic Republic of Congo, and Tod'Aérs Global Network [TGN].

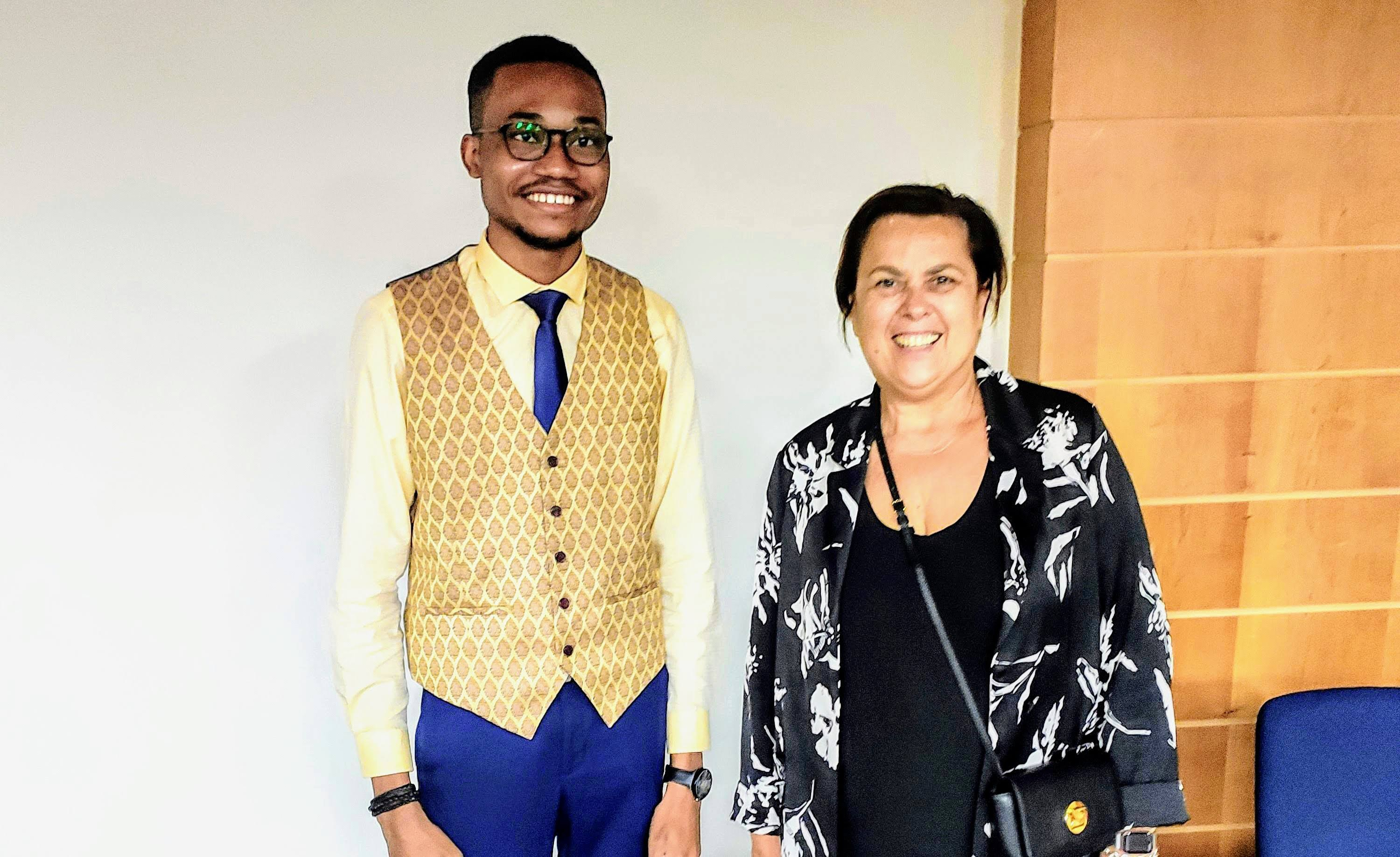
Manuel Ntumba pictured with the Director of the United Nations Office for Outer Space Affairs (UNOOSA) Ms. Simonetta Di Pippo in October 2021.

From 2021 to 2022, Ntumba was a Regional Partnership Manager at the Space Generation Advisory Council - in support of the United Nations Programme on Space Applications, affiliated with the United Nations Office for Outer Space Affairs (UNOOSA) based in Vienna, Austria. Where he was overseeing all regional strategic partnerships for all 54 African countries, and member-states of the United Nations.

Ntumba worked as an expert in geospatial information and earth observation within the consortium on geospatial information of the Erasmus+ Sector Skills Alliance of the European Union, alongside experts from all over Europe.

In 2023, Ntumba briefly served as the African Union (AU) Youth Advisor on Disaster Risk Reduction under the leadership of the African Union Commissioner for Agriculture, Rural Development, Blue Economy and Sustainable Environment Ambassador Josefa Sacko. He served as the Elected Chair of the African Union Youth Advisory Board on Disaster Risk Reduction (AYAB/DRR), jointly coordinated by the Department of Agriculture, Rural Development, Blue Economy and Sustainable Environment (DARBE), the Disaster Risk Reduction (DRR) Unit and the Youth Division of the African Union Commission (AUC).

Tod'Aérs Global Network [TGN], was co-founded by Ntumba in 2020 which is a global public-private partnership (PPP), established with a vision to support global sustainable development, technological innovation, and socio-economic progress worldwide. The network launches the Global Development Policy Initiative (GDPi) in 2022.

In January 2022, Ntumba gave a TED Talk on "Geospatial technologies for socio-economic progress". He recommended the use of geospatial solutions for socio-economic progress and sustainable development. In his presentation, Ntumba demonstrated geospatial-based solutions and applications in the perspective of climate resilience and sustainable development strategies to face climate change.

== See also ==
- Simonetta Di Pippo
- Félix Tshisekedi
- Vanessa Lawrence
- Chido Cleopatra Mpemba
- Aya Chebbi
- Bogolo Kenewendo
