= List of ambassadors of China to the Netherlands =

The ambassador of China to the Netherlands is the official representative of the People's Republic of China to the Netherlands.

== List of representatives ==
=== Republic of China ===
Name (English)	Name (Chinese)	Tenure begins	Tenure ends	Note
Liu Jingren	刘镜人	February 1912	16 September 1912	
Wei Chenzu	魏宸组	22 November 1912	10 December 1913	
Tang Zaifu	唐在复	9 December 1913	29 December 1920	
Wang Guangyi	王广圻	29 December 1920	12 July 1927	
Dai Mingfu	戴明辅	2 September 1927	8 August 1933	
Jin Wensi	金问泗	20 May 1933	15 February 1943	
Jin Wensi	金问泗	15 February 1943	19 March 1945	
Dong Lin	董霖	19 March 1945	46 November 1946	
Wei Gengsheng	魏艮声	1946	1 February 1947	
Zhang Qian	张谦	27 November 1946	27 March 1950	

=== People's Republic of China ===
Name (English)	Name (Chinese)	Tenure begins	Tenure ends	Note
Gu Ji	顾亟	September 1955	November 1955	
Xie Li	谢黎	19 August 1955	26 May 1963	
Li Enqiu	李恩求	20 July 1963	20 July 1966	
Liao Heshu	廖和叔	1966	24 January 1969	
Yu Lianjia	于连甲	1969	1969	
Li Maolai	李茂来	1970	1972	
Li Maolai	李茂来	May 1972	November 1972	
Hao Deqing	郝德青	November 1972	17 October 1974	
Chen Xinren	陈辛仁	January 1975	13 July 1978	
Ding Xuesong	丁雪松	February 1979	September 1980	
Gao Jie	高杰	September 1980	May 1981	
Gao Jie	高杰	May 1981	February 1982	
Guo Jie	郭洁	14 November 1981	May 1984	
Guo Jie	郭洁	May 1984	27 November 1985	
Wang Xingui	王桂新	January 1986	January 1990	
Wang Qingyu	王庆余	March 1990	August 1994	
Wu Jianmin	吴建民	September 1994	December 1995	
Zhu Manli	朱曼黎	January 1996	March 1998	
Hua Liming	华黎明	April 1998	January 2001	
Zhu Zushou	朱祖寿	February 2001	July 2003	
Xue Hanqin	薛捍勤	September 2003	April 2008	
Zhang Jun	张军	April 2008	August 2012	
Chen Xu	陈旭	April 2013	April 2016	
Wu Ken	吴恳	April 2016	February 2019	
Xu Hong	徐宏	May 2019	June 2020	
Tan Jian	谈践	December 2020		

== See also ==
- China–Netherlands relations
