= Paloma Merodio Gómez =

Mexican economist

United Nations Committee of Experts on Global Geospatial Information Management (UN-GGIM)
- Incumbent
- Assumed office 2021 Co-leader with Ingrid Vanden Berghe; Fernand Eanes Bale

Vice President of the National Institute of Statistics and Geography of Mexico
- Incumbent
- Assumed office 2017
- Preceded by: Rolando Ocampo Alcántar

Personal details
- Born: April 10, 1985 (39 years old) Mexico City
- Education: PhD in Economics
- Awards: Geospatial World 50 Rising Stars

Paloma Merodio Gómez (Mexico City, April 10, 1985) is a Mexican official and economist. She is a member of the Board of Governors of the National Institute of Statistics and Geography in Mexico, serving as Vice President responsible for the National Subsystem of Geographic, Environment, Land, and Urban Planning Information (SNIGMAOTU) from 2017 to 2024. She was chair of the United Nations Regional Committee on Global Geospatial Information Management for the Americas (UN-GGIM: Americas) from 2017 to 2021. From 2021 to 2024, she co-chaired the United Nations Committee of Experts on Global Geospatial Information Management (UN-GGIM) one of the subsidiary bodies of the United Nations Economic and Social Council (ECOSOC) that fosters global development through geospatial information management.

== Biography ==
=== Academic background ===
Born in Mexico City on April 10, 1985. She studied for a Bachelor's degree in Economics with a specialization in Political Economy at the Autonomous Technological Institute of Mexico from 2005 to 2009. After graduating, she pursued a Master's in Public Administration in International Development at Harvard University from 2011 to 2013. Subsequently, in 2024, she graduated with honors with a PhD in Economics from the National Autonomous University of Mexico.

=== Professional career ===
She worked at the Ministry of Social Development as the General Director of Evaluation and Monitoring of Social Programs and served at the Mexican Social Security Institute (IMSS) as the Coordinator of Strategic Research. She has been a consultant for the World Bank in Indonesia and for the International Finance Corporation (IFC).

In April 2017, she joined the Board of Governors of the National Institute of Statistics and Geography (INEGI) as the Vice President responsible for the National Subsystem of Geographic, Environmental, Land, and Urban Planning Information (SNIGMAOTU), which is part of the National System of Statistical and Geographic Information (SNIEG) of Mexico. With her appointment in 2017, she became the second woman to be part of the Board of Governors in the 34-year history of the institute, following economist Rocío Ruiz Chávez in 2009. INEGI is the autonomous public body responsible for regulating and coordinating the National System of Statistical and Geographical Information. It is also tasked with collecting and disseminating information about Mexico in terms of territory, resources, population, and economy. This allows for understanding the characteristics of the country and aids in the decision-making process.

In December 2017, in her role as vice president, she assumed the presidency of the United Nations Regional Committee on Global Geospatial Information Management for the Americas (UN-GGIM: Americas) for a five-year term. During the eleventh session of the United Nations Committee of Experts on Global Geospatial Information Management (UN-GGIM), held in August 2021 at the United Nations headquarters in New York, she was elected Co-chair of this committee alongside Ingrid Vanden Berghe of the National Geographic Institute of Belgium and Fernand Eanes Bale of the National Office of Technical Studies and Development in Ivory Coast.

She has been a member of the International Women's Forum, Mexico (IWF) since 2021. This forum seeks to strengthen a network of support by amplifying the voices and stories of its members, increasing presence and support with leadership and equality, and creating visibility.

== Publications ==
=== Book ===
"Women in Statistics and in Geography" was presented on September 6, 2023, at the XXIV International Meeting on Gender Statistics held at the INEGI headquarters in Aguascalientes, Mexico. This book collects the life experiences and contributions of women who have advanced statistics and geography over four decades at the National Institute of Statistics and Geography in Mexico.

=== Selected publications ===
- Arce Peña, N., Warman Diamant, J., Merodio Gómez, P., Aguilar López, J., Ramírez Santiago, A., Rhodes Espinoza, A., Hernández López, S., Rodríguez Ortega, C., Martí Flores, E., Izábal Martínez, J., Navarrete Hernández, A. & Jiménez Nava, F. (2022). Perspectivas para la integración de información oceánica en México.
- Casanova, R., Merodio Gómez, P., Monett Hernández, A. & Ramírez Santiago, A. (2021). Americas' Geospatial Response to COVID-19. In Rajabifard et al., (Eds.), COVID-19 Pandemic, Geospatial Information, and Community Resilience: Global Applications and Lessons (pp. 245–254).
- Céline, J., Merodio Gómez, P., Arriaga, V. & Ramírez Santiago, A. (2023). Citizen science interactions with official geospatial information: Case studies from Mexico. Frontiers in Environmental Science, 10, 01–17.
- Dhu, T., Giuliani, G., Juárez, J., Kavvada, A., Killough, B., Merodio Gómez, P., Minchin, S. & Ramage, S. (2019). National Open Data Cubes and Their Contribution to Country-Level Development Policies and Practices. Data, 4(4), 1–17.
- Juárez Carrillo, O. J., Merodio Gómez, P., Ponce Medina, M. S., Ornelas de Anda, J. L. & Coronado Iruegas, A. A. (2020). Cubo de datos geoespaciales para el uso de las imágenes satelitales en la generación de información geográfica y estadística. REALIDAD, DATOS Y ESPACIO: REVISTA INTERNACIONAL DE ESTADÍSTICA Y GEOGRAFÍA, 11(3), 124–139.
- Kavvada, A., Ishida, C., Juárez Carrillo, J. O., Ramage, S., Merodio Gómez, P. & Friedl, L. (2022). EO4SDG. In Kavvada, A., et al., (Eds.), Earth Observation Applications and Global Policy Frameworks (pp. 145–157). American Geophysical Union.
- Merodio Gómez, P., Pérez García, M., García Seco, G., Ramírez Santiago, A. & Tapia Johnson, C. (2019). The Americas' Spatial Data Infrastructure. ISPRS International Journal of Geo-Information, 8(10), 432.
- Merodio Gómez, P., Juárez Carrillo, O. J., Kuffer, M., Thomson, D., Quiroz, J., Villaseñor García, E., Vanhuysse, S., Abascal, A., Oluoch, I., Nagenborg, M. & Persello, C. (2021). Earth Observations and Statistics: Unlocking Sociodemographic Knowledge through the Power of Satellite Images. Sustainability, 13, 12640.
- Merodio Gómez, P., Limones García, E. & Ramírez Santiago, A. (2020). Strengthening resilience in the Caribbean region through the Spatial Data Infrastructures. International Journal of Cartography, 7(1), 60–77.
- Merodio Gómez, P., Ramírez Santiago, A., García Seco, G., Casanova, R., MacKenzie, D. & Tucker, C. (2022). Ethics in the use of geospatial information in the Americas. Technology in Society, 69, 101964.
- Merodio Gómez, P., Ramírez Santiago, A., García Seco, G., Moreno Mayorga, S. L. & Arias Vizcaino, L. A. (2023). Índice de Vulnerabilidad a COVID-19 en Centroamérica. Revista Geográfica, 166, 25–52.

== Honors and awards ==
- Altered Resume https://www.proceso.com.mx/reportajes/2017/4/12/la-gris-paloma-merodio-otro-capricho-de-pena-nieto-182241.html
- Recognized as a leader in the Geospatial World 50 Rising Stars 2021 initiative for her contributions as a proactive and passionate young professional valuing geospatial technology for society, the environment, and the economy.
- Graduated with honors as Doctor of Economics from the National Autonomous University of Mexico in 2024.
- Received a special mention for her bachelor's degree in economics in 2009.
