= United Nations Group of Experts on Geographical Names =

UN group that standardizes place names

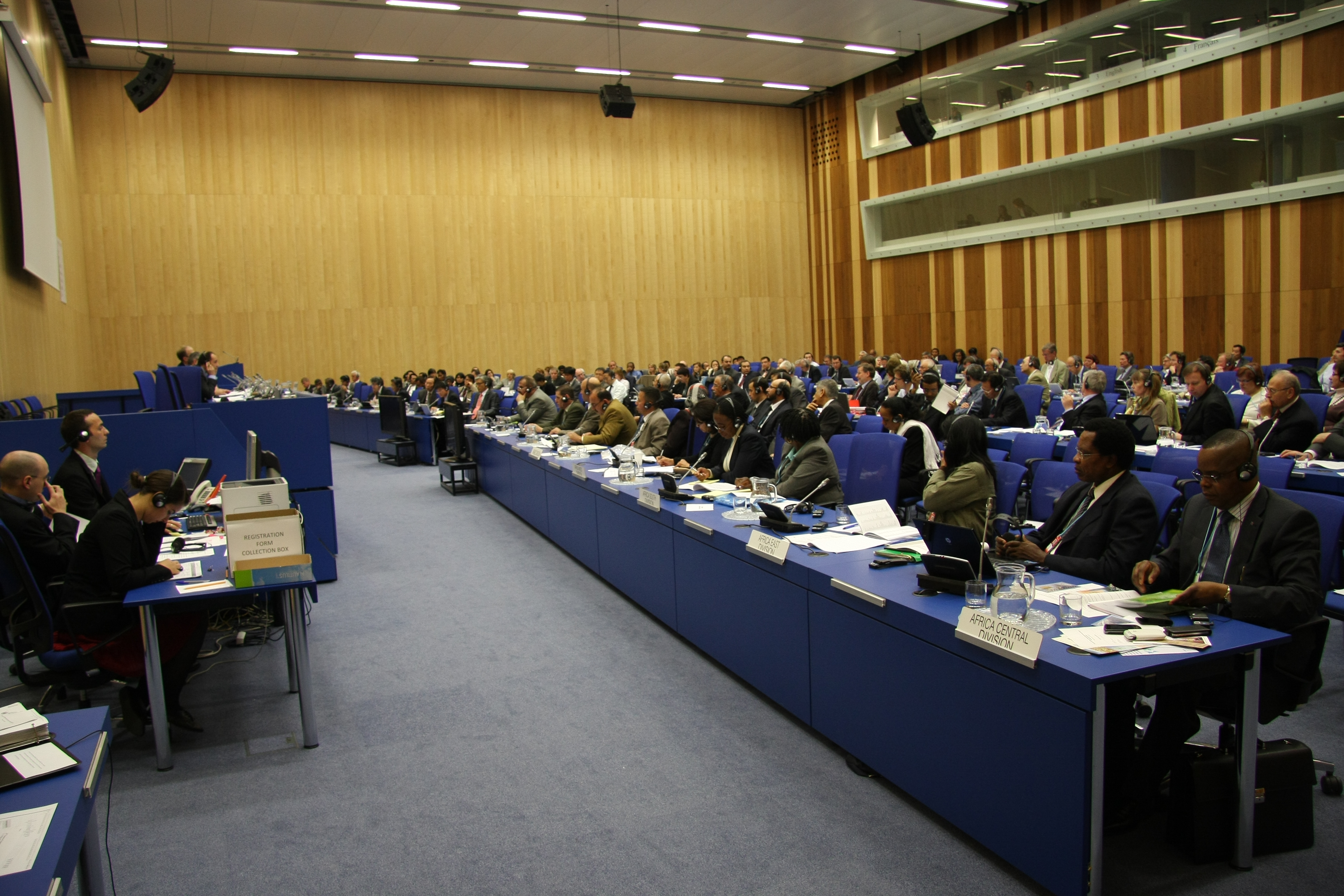
Experts during the 26th Session of the United Nations Group of Experts on Geographical Names (2–6 May 2011, United Nations Office, Vienna)

The United Nations Group of Experts on Geographical Names (UNGEGN) is one of the nine expert groups of the United Nations Economic and Social Council (ECOSOC) and deals with the national and international standardization of geographical names. Every five years it holds the UNGEGN conference. The UNGEGN also publishes international guidelines.

== History ==
The question of standardizing geographical names was raised by the United Nations Cartographic Section of the United Nations Economic and Social Council (ECOSOC) in the late 1940s. After discussions in the 1950s and ECOSOC resolution 715A (XXVII) of 1959, the first meeting of a group of experts was convened in New York City in 1960. This group recommended that a UN Conference on the Standardization of Geographical Names be held. In 1967 this took place in Geneva, with the confirmation that national standardization should be the basis of international standardization.

== Mandate and tasks ==
The remit of UNGEGN is to deal with the problems of domestic and international standardization of geographical names, and to offer suggestions and recommendations for (mainly linguistic) standardization. Being one of the seven expert groups of the United Nations Economic and Social Council, UNGEGN is mandated to follow up on the implementation of resolutions and to continue activities between the United Nations Conferences on the Standardization of Geographical Names held every five years.

UNGEGN aims to emphasize the importance of the standardization of geographical names at the national and international levels, to show the benefits of this, and to assist countries in standardization of geographical names where it is lacking. Furthermore, UNGEGN facilitates and encourages the discussion of the results of work on national standardization and arising issues, the dissemination of best practices, and a wide user community awareness of nationally authorized geographical names.

== Structure ==
UNGEGN reports to the UN Conferences on the Standardization of Geographical Names held at five-yearly intervals. It is supported by a Secretariat provided by the United Nations Statistics Division, and its Bureau. UNGEGN meets formally on two occasions between Conferences and works on names standardization through Working Groups and Special task teams, as well as through Divisions. These so-called Divisions are groups of countries with common interests based on geography and/or language. To interact with other scientific organizations, UNGEGN has appointed a number of liaison officers.

=== Bureau ===
The UNGEGN Bureau consists of a Chair, two Vice-Chairs and two Rapporteurs. The current Bureau is composed as follows:

- Chair: Pierre Jaillard (France)
- Vice-Chairs: Sungjae Choo (Republic of Korea), Hasanuddin Abidin (Indonesia)
- Rapporteurs: Trent C. Palmer (USA), Wendy Shaw (New Zealand)

Former chairpersons:

- Meredith F. Burrill (USA, 1967–1977)
- Josef Breu (Austria, 1977–1982)
- Dirk Peter Blok (Netherlands, 1982–1987)
- Henri Dorion (Canada, 1987–1991)
- Peter E. Raper (South Africa, 1991–2002)
- Helen Kerfoot (Canada, 2002–2012)
- William Watt (Australia, 2012-2019)

=== Divisions ===
UNGEGN is composed of experts from various linguistic/geographical divisions that have been established by the UN Conferences on the Standardization of Geographical Names. Countries decide for themselves the division(s) to which they wish to belong; some belong to more than one division. A division chair is selected within a division and he/she is encouraged to stimulate activities in the standardization of geographical names within the division, through technical meetings, correspondence, etc.

Currently, there are 24 divisions that guide the work of UNGEGN during and between its sessions:

- Africa Central Division
- Africa East Division
- Africa South Division
- Africa West Division
- Arabic Division
- Asia East Division (other than China)
- Asia South-East Division
- Asia South-West Division (other than Arabic)
- Baltic Division
- Celtic Division
- China Division
- Dutch- and German-speaking Division
- East Central and South-East Europe Division
- Eastern Europe, Northern and Central Asia Division
- East Mediterranean Division (other than Arabic)
- French-speaking Division
- India Division
- Latin America Division
- Norden Division
- Pacific South-West Division
- Portuguese-speaking Division
- Romano-Hellenic Division
- United Kingdom Division
- USA/Canada Division

=== Working Groups ===
Under the umbrella of UNGEGN, several Working Groups have been created to follow up topics and issues which cut across the Divisional structure of UNGEGN. In addition, UNGEGN has a Task Team for Africa and coordinates the work of countries in developing their toponymic guidelines.

Currently there are 9 UNGEGN Working Groups:

- Working Group on Country Names
- Working Group on Geographical Names Data Management (until 2021 as Working Group on Toponymic Data Files and Gazetteers)
- Working Group on Toponymic Terminology
- Working Group on Publicity and Funding
- Working Group on Romanization Systems
- Working Group on Training Courses in Toponymy
- Working Group on Evaluation and Implementation
- Working Group on Exonyms
- Working Group on Geographical Names as Cultural Heritage

The former Working Group on Pronunciation was disbanded in 2017.

== Conference ==
The United Nations Conference on the Standardization of Geographical Names is a periodic international conference organised by the United Nations Statistical Commission, the central purpose of which is to facilitate the standardization of national geographical names. The purpose of the Conference is not to settle political disputes between states on the use (or non-use) of particular geographical names.

The conference takes place every five years at United Nations Headquarters in New York City. It can be conducted at a different location, if a country offers to host the conference and to pay the additional costs of hosting the conference away from UN HQ. Each country may send a delegation. Members of these delegations are mainly experts on geographical names from their respective countries.

The most recent conference, the 11th, was held in New York in August 2017.

== Toponymic guidelines ==
Toponymic guidelines (full title: Toponymic guidelines for map and other editors, for international use) are up-to-date documents promoted by the UNGEGN. The aim of these documents is to compile information on toponymic issues of a certain country, especially from the perspective of standardization of geographical names.

=== Origin ===
At the Third United Nations Conference on the Standardization of Geographical Names held in August/September 1977 at Athens, gathering and dissemination of toponymic information was discussed. The great variation in approaches from country to country led Josef Breu, who was elected Chair of the United Nations Group of Experts (UNGEGN) on that very Conference, to initiate the compilation of more or less standardized toponymic guidelines. As a sample for these guidelines he elaborated Toponymic Guidelines for International Cartography of his native Austria and presented them as Working Paper Nr. 5 at the Eighth Session of the UNGEGN, held in February/March 1979 at New York. This sample sticks to the table of contents which Breu had already outlined in 1977.

=== Promotion by UN resolutions ===
The echo on Breu's proposal was positive. In the years to come four resolutions were adopted in favour of the promotion of toponymic guidelines. At the 4th UN Conference on the Standardization of Geographical Names (Geneva, August/September 1982) resolution nr. 4 was drafted, concerning the publication of toponymic guidelines for map and other editors: This resolution presents a checklist on the contents of guidelines and recommends that the toponymic guidelines submitted by Austria should serve as a sample of format and contents. It also recommends that a correspondent should be appointed by the UNGEGN to coordinate the work of developing national toponymic guidelines and to maintain communication with national experts involved in their elaboration.

At the 5th United Nations Conference on the Standardization of Geographical Names (Montreal, August 1987) another two resolutions were passed that concern toponymic guidelines: Resolution nr. 11 recommends that a clear typographical distinction should be made on national maps between toponyms and text items for other purposes. The methods of differentiations should be explained in the national toponymic guidelines.

Resolution nr. 14 of this Conference recommends that countries should be strongly encouraged to publish and keep up to date Toponymic Guidelines, and that the United Nations Secretariat should provide appropriate assistance for their publication and dissemination.

At the 6th UN Conference on the Standardization of Geographical Names (New York, August/September 1992) resolution nr. 14 recommends toponymic guidelines in combined volumes, in at least one of the working languages of the United Nations, and that provision should be made to issue the guidelines in the World Cartography bulletin.

The title of the Toponymic Guidelines was modified in 1982 and 1986. Whereas Breu in his sample used the title Toponymic Guidelines for International Cartography, the above-mentioned resolution nr. 4 of the 4th UN Conference on the Standardization of Geographical Names used the title Toponymic guidelines for map and other editors. In 1986, on the 12th Session of the UNGEGN, it was decided to add for international use to the title.

=== Contents ===
Resolution nr. 4, passed at the 4th UN Conference on the Standardization of Geographical Names in 1982, presented a checklist of items which toponymic guidelines should contain:

- Legal status of geographical names in the respective languages of multilingual countries;
- Alphabets of the language or languages and, furthermore, in the case of non-Roman alphabets and scripts, the officially introduced romanization keys;
- Spelling rules for geographical names;
- Aids to pronunciation of geographical names;
- Linguistic substrata recognizable in the existing place names, but only as far as their knowledge could be of benefit to the cartographer;
- Relationship between dialect(s) and standard language(s);
- Peculiarities of dialect and areal distribution of the main dialects;
- Areal distribution of languages in multilingual countries;
- Names authorities and measures taken in names standardization;
- Source material;
- Glossary of words necessary for the understanding of maps;
- Abbreviations in official maps;
- Administrative divisions.

== See also ==
- Geographic Names Information System (GNIS)
- Toponymy
- United Nations Committee of Experts on Global Geospatial Information Management
