= List of ambassadors of China to Germany =

Coordinates: 52.513806°N 13.418°E

Ambassador of China to Germany
- Incumbent; Shi Mingde since 1 August 2012
- Inaugural holder: Liu Xihong
- Formation: 30 April 1877; 149 years ago

The ambassador of China to Germany is the official representative of the People's Republic of China to the Federal Republic of Germany.

== List of representatives ==
Diplomatic agrément/Diplomatic accreditation	Ambassador	Chinese language zh:中国驻德国大使列表	Observations	Premier of the People's Republic of China	Leader of Germany	Term end
April 30, 1877	Liu Xihong	刘锡鸿		Cixi	William I, German Emperor	August 25, 1878
August 25, 1878	Li Fengbao	zh:李凤苞		Cixi	William I, German Emperor	April 28, 1884
April 28, 1884	Xu Jingcheng	zh:许景澄		Cixi	William I, German Emperor	June 23, 1887
June 23, 1887	Hong Jun	zh:洪钧		Cixi	William I, German Emperor	September 9, 1890
September 9, 1890	Xu Jingcheng	zh:許景澄		Cixi	Wilhelm II, German Emperor	January 7, 1897
November 26, 1896	Huang Zunxian	zh:黃遵憲	has not been accredited	Cixi	Wilhelm II, German Emperor	
June 23, 1897	Lü Haihuan	zh:呂海寰		Cixi	Wilhelm II, German Emperor	December 13, 1901
July 17, 1901	Yinchang	zh:廕昌		Cixi	Wilhelm II, German Emperor	April 25, 1906
September 20, 1905	Yang Sheng	zh:杨晟		Cixi	Wilhelm II, German Emperor	December 30, 1906
November 10, 1906	Zeng Guangquan	zh:曾广铨	has not been accredited	Cixi	Wilhelm II, German Emperor	
April 23, 1907	Sun Baoqi	zh:孫寶琦		Cixi	Wilhelm II, German Emperor	November 24, 1908
September 23, 1908	Yinchang	zh:廕昌		Pu Yi	Wilhelm II, German Emperor	November 8, 1909
March 21, 1910	Liang Cheng	zh:梁诚		Pu Yi	Wilhelm II, German Emperor	November 1, 1912
April 2, 1913	Yan Huiqing	zh:颜惠庆	As a result of Sino-German diplomatic relations, July 1, 1917 withdrawal	Xiong Xiling	Wilhelm II, German Emperor	July 1, 1917
March 14, 1917			Suspension of diplomatic relations Protecting power Denmark	Duan Qirui	Wilhelm II, German Emperor	July 27, 1921
July 27, 1921	Wei Chenzu	zh:魏宸组	November 25, 1925 sent to supervise the national railway preparations	Yan Huiqing	Constantin Fehrenbach	July 27, 1921
November 24, 1926	Huang Fu	zh:黄郛	Due to July 7, 1927, the mayor of Shanghai may not be appointed. has not been accredited	Du Xigui	Wilhelm Marx	
January 23, 1929	Jiang Zuobin	zh:蔣作賓	Concurrently in Austria	Tan Yankai	Hermann Müller (politician)	March 5, 1931
December 30, 1931	Liu Wendao	zh:劉文島	Concurrently in Austria	Chiang Kai-shek	Heinrich Brüning	September 13, 1933
January 6, 1934	Liu Chongjie	zh:劉文島	Concurrently in Austria	Wang Jingwei	Adolf Hitler	May 18, 1935
May 18, 1935	Liu Chongjie	zh:刘崇杰	On May 18, 1935, the German embassy was upgraded to an embassy	Chiang Kai-shek	Adolf Hitler	June 28, 1935
January 21, 1936	Cheng Tien-fong	zh:程天放		Chiang Kai-shek	Adolf Hitler	June 15, 1938
September 21, 1938	Chen Jie	zh:陈介	July 1, 1941 Germany recognized Wang Jingwei regime.	H. H. Kung	Adolf Hitler	July 10, 1941
September 11, 1941	Li Shengwu	李圣五	(*1892) has not been accredited	Wang Jingwei	Adolf Hitler	
September 16, 1941	Li Fang (diplomat) of the Reorganized National Government of the Republic of China)	zh:李芳	Nanking Appoints Minister Li Fang, Commercial Attaché to Berlin. Although it had originally been planned for Mr. Li Sheng-wu, Nanking's newly appointed Ambassador to Germany, to sail for Lisabon aboard the Asama Maru, his position as Chief of the Education Department made his immediate departure impossible.	Wang Jingwei	Adolf Hitler	
November 12, 1938	Lu Yiwen	zh:吕宜文	Lue-I-Wen, Lu-I-Wen, Lu I-Wen, Lü-I-Wen und Lü I-Wen, Manchukuo Minister to the German Empire, In 1938, Germany recognized Manchukuo, Lu Yewen was appointed Minister of Manchuria in Germany, and the Registrar Wang Ti Fu (born in 1911 - 2001 death) and others went to Germany to take office. In May 1939, at the request of the German Ministry of Foreign Affairs, he began to issue a visa for the Jews. In September 1939, he was hinted by the German Ministry of Foreign Affairs, asking him not to continue to issue a visa, but he continued to acquiesce in the payment of his visa until May 1940. They have issued a total of 12,000 visas to the Jews, saving the lives of these people.	Zhang Jinghui	Adolf Hitler	
June 1, 1973	Wang Yutian	zh:王雨田		Zhou Enlai	Willy Brandt	May 1, 1974
September 1, 1974	Wang shu	zh:王殊		Zhou Enlai	Helmut Schmidt	November 1, 1976
August 1, 1977	Zhang Tong	zh:张彤 (外交官)		Hua Guofeng	Helmut Schmidt	October 1, 1982
February 1, 1983	An Zhiyuan	zh:安致远		Zhao Ziyang	Helmut Kohl	April 1, 1985
April 1, 1985	Guo Fengmin	zh:郭丰民		Zhao Ziyang	Helmut Kohl	April 1, 1988
May 1, 1988	Mei Zhaorong	zh:梅兆荣		Li Peng	Helmut Kohl	January 1, 1997
January 1, 1997	Lu Qiutian	zh:卢秋田		Li Peng	Helmut Kohl	December 1, 2001
January 1, 2002	Ma Canrong	zh:马灿荣		Zhu Rongji	Gerhard Schröder	July 1, 2009
August 1, 2009	Wu Hongbo	zh:吴红波		Wen Jiabao	Angela Merkel	August 1, 2012
August 1, 2012	Shi Mingde	zh:史明德		Wen Jiabao	Angela Merkel	February 2019
	Wu Ken				Angela Merkel Olaf Scholz	
	Deng Hongbo				Olaf Scholz	

== See also ==
- China–Germany relations
