= Josef Breu =

Austrian geographer and cartographer (1914–1998)

Josef Breu (6 January 1914, in Trieste – 26 April 1998, in Vienna) was an Austrian geographer and cartographer and for several years Chair of the United Nations Group of Experts on Geographical Names (UNGEGN).

== Life ==
Josef Breu grew up in Budapest (Hungary), Türnitz (Austria), Niesky (Germany) and Klosterneuburg (Austria), where he passed the high-school leaving exam in 1932. In the same year he started studying geography and history at the University of Vienna. His dissertation on the history of Croatian settlements in the south eastern border regions of the German-speaking lands was approved in 1937. Breu, who was a polyglot, worked at the Geography Department of the University of Vienna from 1936 to 1938. In 1939 he started teaching at the Abbey’s Secondary School at Melk, but was drafted to the Wehrmacht in the same year, where he worked for the cartographic service. After World War II Breu worked as a surveyor and private teacher, before he entered the service of the Federal Office for Metrology and Surveying at Vienna (Bundesamt für Eich- und Vermessungswesen). From 1959 until 1966 he again taught at a grammar school. Already in 1959 Breu hat started collaborating with the Vienna based Institute for East and Southeast European Studies (Ost- und Südosteuropa-Institut). From 1966 until 1979, the year of his retirement, he was the head of the geographic department of that institution. After his habilitation in 1974 Breu became a docent at the Geography Department of the University of Vienna. In 1982 he became a corresponding member of the Austrian Academy of Sciences.

== Career ==
Within the Institute for East and Southeast European Studies Breus main field of activity was the Atlas of the Danubian Countries. Josef Breu was also very active in the sphere of toponomastics, especially in the standardization of geographical names. In 1969 he initiated the foundation of the Austrian Board on Geographical Names (Arbeitsgemeinschaft für Kartographische Ortsnamenkunde), that functions as a clearinghouse of the main Austrian federal and provincial authorities and institutions of science and research as well as of private publishers concerned with geographical names. Breu held the chair of this board until 1982. In 1975 he published his Gazetteer of Austria, edited in accordance with the recommendations of the United Nations. This dictionary of geographical proper names of Austria, one of his main works, covers rivers, lakes, glaciers, mountains, passes, mountain ranges, populated places, roads, railways, waterways, etc. It gives a broad range of data with every name, such as correct spelling, pronunciation, indication of the respective topographic category, location, geographical coordinates, elevation above sea level, name of the administrative unit in which the name feature is situated, variant forms (if any) and grammatical references. From 1976 until 1982 Breu held the chair of the Permanent Committee on Geographical Names (Ständiger Ausschuss für Geographische Namen), a board which promotes and coordinates the standardization of toponyms in the German-speaking countries. In 1977 Josef Breu was elected Chair of the United Nations Group of Experts on Geographical Names (UNGEGN), where he had already been active for several years before. The UNGEGN Toponymic Guidelines were established on his initiative.
