= Zhu Zushou =

Chinese diplomat

Ambassador of China to the Netherlands
- In office January 2001 – July 2003
- Preceded by: Hua Liming
- Succeeded by: Xue Hanqin

Ambassador of China to Hungary
- In office September 2003 – January 2007
- Preceded by: Zhao Xidi
- Succeeded by: Zhang Chunxiang

Personal details
- Born: June 1945
- Died: 1 January 2023 (aged 77) Beijing, China
- Education: Beijing Foreign Studies University

Zhu Zushou (Chinese: 朱祖寿, June 1945 – 1 January 2023) was a Chinese diplomat.

== Life and career ==
Zhu served as the Chinese ambassador to the Netherlands from 2001 to 2003, and then ambassador to Hungary from 2003 to 2007. He was then China's representative to the Organisation for the Prohibition of Chemical Weapons from 2007 to 2011.

Zhu died in Beijing of COVID-19 on 1 January 2023, at the age of 77.
