= United Nations Committee of Experts on Global Geospatial Information Management =

UN geospatial information committee

The United Nations Committee of Experts on Global Geospatial Information Management (UN-GGIM) is one of the nine expert groups of the United Nations Economic and Social Council (ECOSOC) and to foster the global development geospatial information.

In 2011 the British geographer Vanessa Lawrence was elected to serve as the inaugural co-chair of United Nations Committee of Experts on Global Geospatial Information Management (UN-GGIM). She served in this role continuously for four years, and was awarded a Certificate of Appreciation by the Under-Secretary-General, Dr Wu Hongbo

== Geospatial Societies ==
The UN-GGIM Geospatial Societies (UN-GGIM GS), previously Joint Board of Geospatial Information Societies (JBGIS), is a coalition recognized by the UN-GGIM:

- IEEE Geoscience and Remote Sensing Society
- International Association of Geodesy
- International Cartographic Association
- International Federation of Surveyors
- International Geographical Union
- International Map Industry Association
- International Society for Digital Earth
- International Society of Photogrammetry and Remote Sensing

Other than the full members above, there are the following observing members of the UN-GGIM GS:

- International Hydrographic Organization
- Urban and Regional Information Systems Association

== Notable members ==
- Vanessa Lawrence, British geographer, and first Co-chair of the United Nations Committee of Experts on Global Geospatial Information Management (2011-2015)
- Ingrid Vanden Berghe, Belgian geospatial specialist and new Co-chair of the United Nations Committee of Experts on Global Geospatial Information Management (2020-)
- Paloma Merodio Gómez, Mexican geographer and new Co-chair of the United Nations Committee of Experts on Global Geospatial Information Management (2022-)
- Fernand Bale, Ivorian geographer and new Co-chair of the United Nations Committee of Experts on Global Geospatial Information Management (2022-)

== See also ==
- United Nations Group of Experts on Geographical Names
- ISC GeoUnions
