= Wu Ken =

Chinese diplomat

- 吴恳
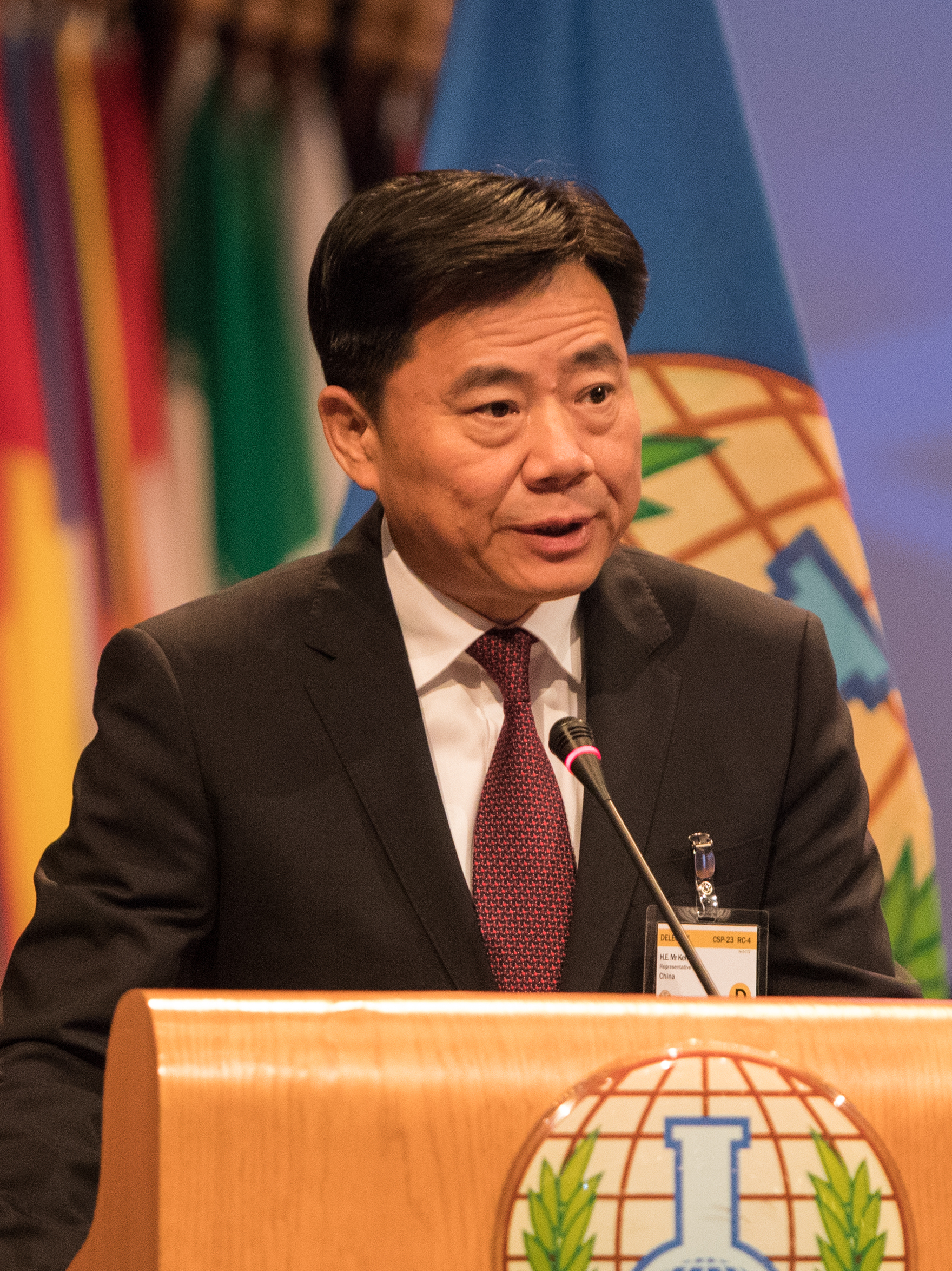

Chinese Ambassador to Germany
- In office March 2019 – August 2024
- Preceded by: Shi Mingde
- Succeeded by: Deng Hongbo

Chinese Ambassador to the Netherlands
- In office April 2016 – February 2019
- Preceded by: Chen Xu
- Succeeded by: Xu Hong

Chinese Ambassadors to Switzerland
- In office September 2010 – July 2013
- Preceded by: Dong Jinyi
- Succeeded by: Xu Jinghu

Chinese Ambassadors to Austria
- In office October 2007 – August 2010
- Preceded by: Lu Yonghua
- Succeeded by: Shi Mingde

Personal details
- Born: January 1961 (age 65) Hunan, China
- Party: Chinese Communist Party
- Education: Wuhan University

Chinese name
- Simplified Chinese: 吴恳
- Traditional Chinese: 吳懇
Transcriptions
Standard Mandarin
- Hanyu Pinyin: Wú Kěn

Wu Ken (Chinese: 吴恳; pinyin: Wú Kěn; born 1961) is a Chinese diplomat who has been serving as the Chinese ambassador to Germany from March 2019 to August 2024.

== Biography ==
Wu was born 1961 in Hunan, China.

Wu Ken started his diplomatic career in the personnel department of the Ministry of Foreign Affairs. After attending a postgraduate course at the University of Frankfurt, Wu Ken worked as an Attaché of the Ministry of Foreign Affairs in the department of Soviet- and Eurasian affairs. In 1990 he was appointed as Attaché and 3rd Secretary of the Chinese embassy in Germany. From 1993 to 1998, Wu Ken occupied the following posts: 3rd secretary, assistant sector leader and sector leader of the personnel department of the Ministry of Foreign Affairs.

In 1998, he was assigned as embassy counselor of the Chinese embassy in Austria. From 2001 to 2007 he worked as the assistant head and later head of the personnel department of the Ministry of Foreign Affairs. Between October 2007 and August 2010, Wu Ken was China's ambassador to Austria. He then served as the Chinese ambassador to Switzerland from September 2010 to July 2013. In May 2016 he was appointed as ambassador to the Netherlands.

He was appointed as the Chinese ambassador to Germany in March 2019. He was appointed as a member of the 14th National Committee of the Chinese People's Political Consultative Conference on 17 January 2023 from the Friendship with Foreign Countries Sector.

In 2025, he was appointed President of the Chinese People's Institute of Foreign Affairs.

Diplomatic posts
Preceded by Lu Yonghua	Chinese Ambassadors to Austria; 2007–2010	Succeeded by Shi Mingde
Preceded by Dong Jinyi	Chinese Ambassadors to Switzerland; 2010–2013	Succeeded by Xu Jinghu
Preceded by Chen Xu	Chinese Ambassadors to the Netherlands; 2016–2019	Succeeded by Xu Hong
Preceded by Shi Mingde	Chinese Ambassadors to Germany; 2019–2024	Succeeded by Deng Hongbo
