= Cheng Tien-fong =

Chinese educator, politician and diplomat

- 程天放
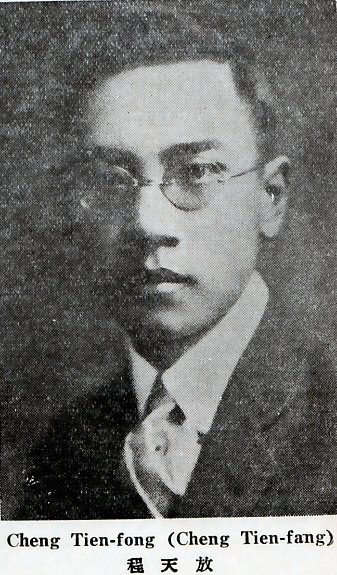

5th Vice President of the Examination Yuan
- In office 1958–1967
- President: Mo Teh-hui; Sun Fo

Minister of Education of the Republic of China
- In office 16 March 1950 – 1 June 1954
- Preceded by: Han Lih-wu
- Succeeded by: Chang Ch'i-yun

Personal details
- Born: 1899 Hangzhou, Zhejiang, Qing dynasty
- Died: 29 November 1967 (aged 67–68) New York City, U.S.
- Party: Kuomintang

Cheng Tien-fong (Chinese: 程天放; pinyin: Chéng Tiānfàng; 1899–1967), was a Chinese educator, politician and diplomat. Cheng was a former President of Zhejiang University, and former Minister of Education of the ROC.

== Biography ==
Cheng's ancestral hometown was Xinjian County, Jiangxi Province. Cheng was born in Hangzhou, Zhejiang Province in 1899 in the late Qing Dynasty. Cheng's birth name was Xueyu (学愉).

Cheng entered Hongdo Middle School (洪都 中学 Hóng-dōu zhōng-xué) in 1912, but soon was transferred into Xinyuan Middle School (心远中学 Xīn-yuǎn zhōng-xué). In 1917, Cheng entered Fudan Public School (复旦 公学 Fù-dàn gōng-xué; now Fudan University) in Shanghai. Cheng graduated in 1919. Cheng was a famous student leader of May Fourth Movement and was elected the president of Shanghai Students' Union.

In 1920, Cheng went to study in USA. In 1922, Cheng graduated with an MA in politics from the University of Illinois Urbana-Champaign. In 1926, Cheng obtained PhD in politics from the University of Toronto. Cheng was the editor-in-chief of a Canadian Chinese newspaper.

Cheng went back to China and was a lecturer at Fudan University. In 1930, Cheng was the acting chairman, equivalent to the current governor, of Anhui Province. In 1932, Cheng was the President of Zhejiang University in Hangzhou. From 1936 to 1938, Cheng was the ambassador of China to Germany (as the first ambassador from the Republic of China to Germany in history). In the 1930s, China maintained 17 diplomatic missions with the most important being the embassies/legations in London, Paris, Berlin, Moscow and Rome with the legations in Warsaw, Prague, Lisbon and Vienna having only a secondary importance. The Chinese diplomats and their families in Europe formed a closely knit group, frequently meeting to discuss developments in Europe and Asia, and in this way came to form a sort of extended family. The Chinese legation in Prague became a favorite meeting place due to the central location of Prague, which made it easy for the Chinese diplomats from across Europe to meet.

The American historian Liang Hsi-Huey, who was the son of Liang Lone, the Chinese minister-plenipotentiary to Czechoslovakia, wrote that Cheng was regarded as the "weakest link" among the Chinese diplomats in Europe. Liang fils wrote that Cheng was appointed ambassador to Germany because he was a "Kuomintang party favorite" whose knowledge of Germany was extremely superficial. Liang wrote that Cheng engaged in "obsequious flattery" of Adolf Hitler in an attempt to win his favor, and his dispatches to Nanking showed a very shallow understanding of National Socialism. By 1936, many of the Chinese diplomats in Europe had come to favor the idea of collective security under the banner of the League of Nations as the best way to rally support from the great powers as China faced increasing aggressive Japanese claims that China was part of the Japanese sphere of influence. Cheng was opposed to these plans for no better reason than Hitler hated the League (which he pulled Germany out of in 1933), arguing that Chinese support for the League would upset the Nazis. Germany was the largest supplier of arms to China while a German military mission was training the National Revolutionary Army, and Cheng's warnings that a League-based foreign policy would strain Sino-German relations carried much weight with Chiang Kai-shek.

The other Chinese diplomats felt that Cheng was too weak a figure to oppose General Hiroshi Ōshima, the Japanese military attaché in Berlin, who was a great friend of Joachim von Ribbentrop. These concerns were increased when Hitler on 4 February 1938 fired Baron Konstantin von Neurath as Foreign Minister and replaced him with Ribbentrop, thereby placing German foreign policy in the hands of a man who was well known for favoring Japan over China. In August 1938, Cheng resigned as ambassador in Berlin and returned to China. In his last message to the Chinese government, which had been forced to relocate to Chongqing, Cheng predicted that Europe was on the brink of war with Germany threatening to invade Czechoslovakia. Cheng was replaced as ambassador by Chen Jie.

From 1939 to 1943, Cheng was the President of National Sichuan University (currently Sichuan University) in Chengdu. Cheng was a representative of China to UNESCO.

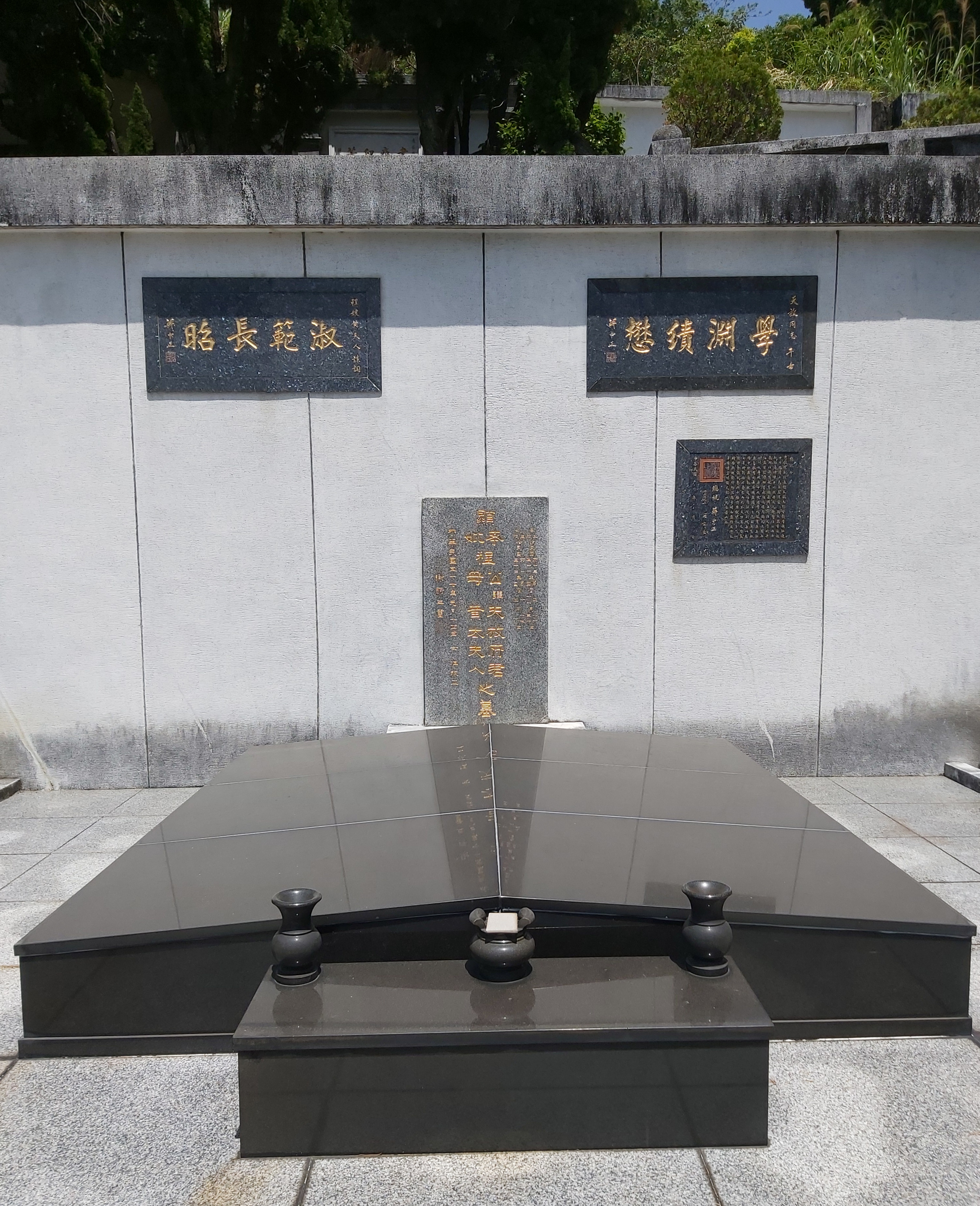
Grave of Cheng Tien-fong in Taipei.

In 1950, Cheng went to Taiwan. From 1950 to 1954, Cheng was the Minister of Education of Taiwan. From 1958 to 1967, Cheng was the Vice President of the Examination Yuan. On 29 November 1967, Cheng died in New York City, United States.

== Books ==
- Liang, Hsi-Huey (1999). "China, the Sino-Japanese Conflict and the Munich Crisis". In Erik Goldstein & Igor Lukes (ed.). The Munich Crisis, 1938 Prelude to World War II. London: Frank Cass. pp. 342–369..
