= List of ambassadors of China to Austria =

The ambassador of China to Austria is the official representative of the People's Republic of China to Austria.

== List of representatives ==
Name (English)	Name (Chinese)	Tenure begins	Tenure ends	Note
Song Enfan	宋恩繁	August 1971	September 1971	
Wang Yueyi	王越毅	September 1971	22 June 1974	
Yu Peiwen	俞沛文	September 1974	January 1980	
Wang Shu	王殊	July 1980	3 December 1985	
Yang Chengxu	杨成绪	December 1985	October 1989	
Hu Benyao	胡本耀	November 1989	March 1994	
Wang Yanyi	王延义	April 1994	October 1997	
Liu Changye	刘昌业	November 1997	July 2000	
Lu Yonghua	卢永华	August 2000	October 2007	
Wu Ken	吴恳	November 2007	August 2010	
Shi Mingde	史明德	August 2010	5 August 2012	
Zhao Bin	赵彬	August 2012	August 2016	
Li Xiaosi	李晓驷	September 2016	2023	
Qi Mei		2023	2025	

== See also ==
- China–Austria relations
