= Sha Zukang =

Chinese diplomat (born 1947)

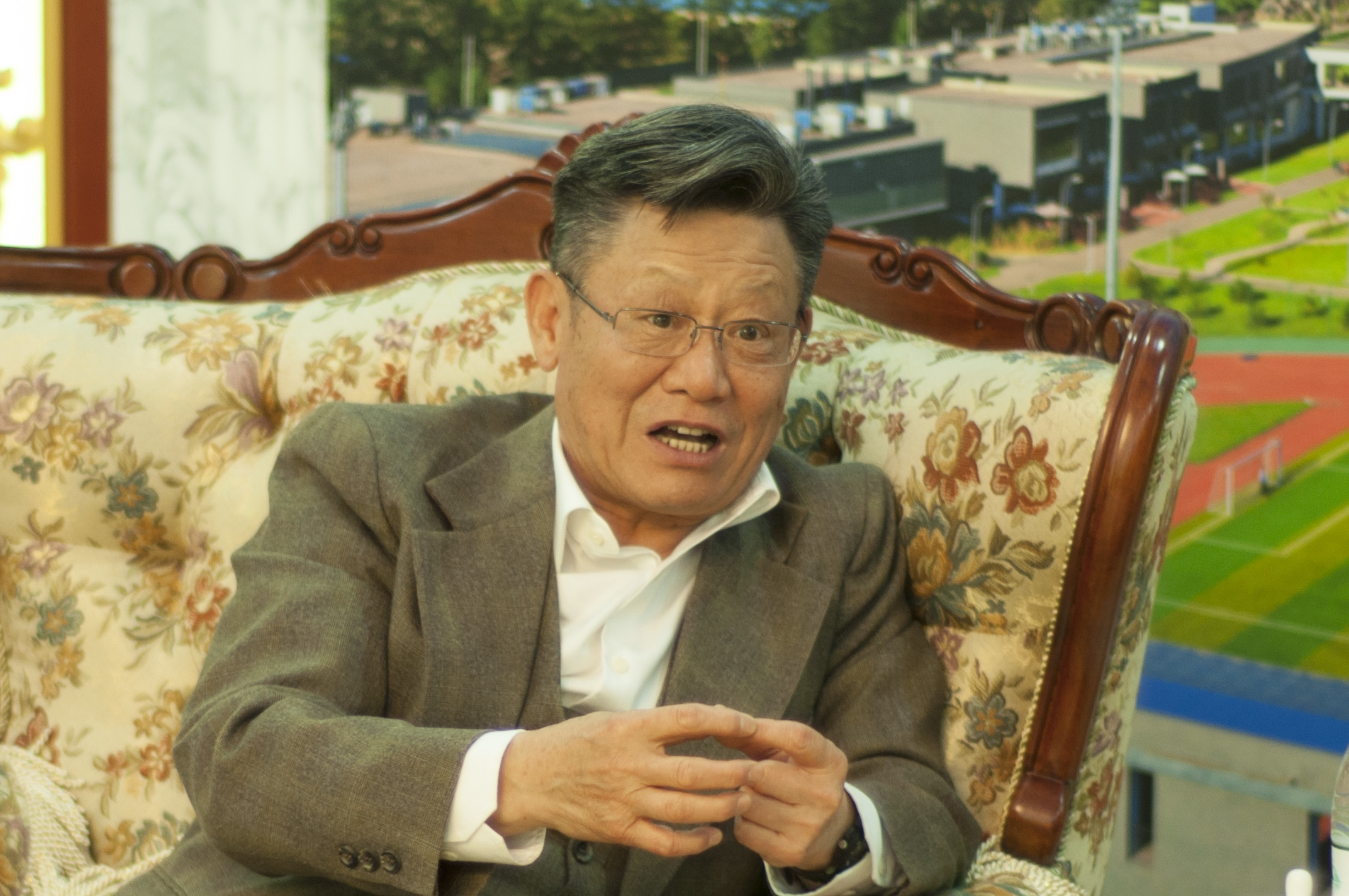
- Sha Zukang in 2015

Under Secretary General, Department of Economic and Social Affairs, United Nations
- In office July 2007 – July 2012
- Preceded by: José Antonio Ocampo
- Succeeded by: Wu Hongbo

Personal details
- Born: 24 September 1947 (age 78) Yixing, Jiangsu, China
- Occupation: United Nations Civil Servant

Sha Zukang (Chinese: 沙祖康; pinyin: Shā Zǔkāng; born 1947) is a Chinese diplomat who was head of the United Nations Department of Economic and Social Affairs from 2007 to 2012. He was previously the Chinese ambassador to the United Nations Office at Geneva.

== Education and diplomatic career ==
A graduate of Nanjing University, Sha started his diplomatic career as a staff member at the Chinese Embassy in the United Kingdom and served in a variety of positions in the Chinese Diplomatic Service. He established the Department of Arms Control in the Ministry of Foreign Affairs and served as its first Director-General from 1997 to 2001. Earlier, he served as Ambassador for Disarmament Affairs and Deputy Permanent Representative of the People's Republic of China to the United Nations Office at Geneva and other international organizations in Switzerland (1995–1997).

== Notable positions ==
He has served as the Chairperson of the Government Group of the Governing Body of the International Labour Organization, President of the Trade and Development Board of the United Nations, Chairman of the Preparatory Committee and the Committee of the Whole of the United Nations Conference on Trade and Development and Coordinator of the Like-Minded-Group of the Human Rights Council.

His latest assignment was as Secretary-General to the Rio Earth Summit, a global conference on sustainable development held in 2012 in Rio de Janeiro.

== Controversies ==
He is noted for being outspoken. In a BBC interview on August 17, 2006, he told the US to "shut up" regarding criticism on arms spending of China, noting that U.S. arms expenditure was half of the world's total. In 2007, Foreign Policy magazine published a satirical commentary purporting to be by Sha, the "UN Secretary for Kicking Butt," and in 2010 called Sha "China's John Bolton" (the famously blunt U.S. ambassador to the UN under President George W. Bush). At an Austrian meeting of UN officials in September 2010, he said to UN Secretary General Ban Ki-moon, "I know you never liked me, Mr. Secretary-General. Well, I never liked you, either" and about Robert Orr, an American UN official, that "I really don't like him." He added that he had come to respect the UN chief and praised Mr. Orr for a speech he had given.
