= Chen Jie (ambassador) =

Chinese politician (1885–1951)

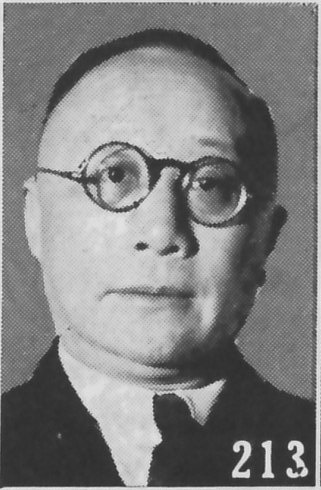

Chinese Ambassador to Germany
- In office 21 September 1938 – 10 July 1941
- President: Chiang Kai-shek

Personal details
- Born: 1885 Hangzhou, Zhejiang Province, Great Qing Empire
- Died: 15 August 1951 (aged 65–66) Buenos Aires, Argentina

Chén Jiè ( 陳介; Wades-Giles: Ch'en Chieh; 1885-15 August 1951) was a Chinese politician and diplomat.

== Civil servant ==
Chen was born in Hangzhou, Zhejiang Province to an upper-class family. After graduating from the Hangzhou Fu High School in 1902, he was sent by the Qing government to study in Japan. Because of the reforms of the Meiji Restoration, Japan was considered to be the most successful Asian nation at the time, and was the preferred place for young Chinese to study. Chen graduated in succession from the Tokyo Hongwen College, Tokyo No. 1 Higher College, and Tokyo Imperial University. In 1907, he went to Germany to study law and economics at the University of Berlin. In 1911, a revolution began that toppled the Qing dynasty, and in 1912 Chen returned to China to serve the newly proclaimed Republic of China. Chen worked as a civil servant, serving as the director of the Commerce Department of the Ministry of Industry and Commerce. In 1916, Chen became a member of the State Council. Chen also taught at Peking University. In 1928, Chen left government service to take up a career in banking.

== Diplomat ==
In 1935, Chen was appointed as the permanent secretary of the Ministry of Foreign Affairs. On 9 July 1937, shortly after the Marco Polo Bridge incident, Chen met with the Japanese diplomat Hidaka Shinkurou to ask that Japan deescalate the crisis, saying that China and Japan were on the brink of war. Chen's meeting was fruitless and all-out war between Japan and China began shortly afterwards. In December 1937, Chen was contacted by Oskar Trautmann, the German ambassador to China, who informed him that his colleague, Herbert von Dirksen, the German ambassador to Japan, had received peace terms from the Japanese. Trautmann informed Chen that the "psychological" moment for peace had arrived as the Japanese were jubilant after taking Nanking, China's capital. Trautmann further noted that the "Rape of Nanking" as the subsequent massacre that followed the fall of Nanking was known was a warning about the Chinese could expect if the peace terms were rejected. Chen for his part indicated that his government was willing to make peace provided that the Japanese terms were moderate. However, the peace terms that Dirksen passed on to Trautmann who in turn passed to Chen were so extreme that the Chinese rejected them.

In September 1938, Chen went to Germany to serve as the Chinese ambassador. Sino-German relations declined rapidly over the course of 1938, and Chen was dispatched to Berlin in an attempt to resuscitate relations. In a point snub, the Germans put off allowing Chen to present his letters of credentials for two months, which much offended the Chinese. On 16 November 1938, Chen arrived at the Reich Chancellery to present his letters of credentials to Adolf Hitler.

In December 1938, Chen ordered Ho Feng-Shan, the Chinese consul in Vienna, to stop issuing visas that allowed Jews to leave Germany, orders that Ho disregarded. Chen called Ho and ordered to stop issuing the "life visas". Ho protested, saying the orders of the Waichiaopu were to maintain a "liberal policy" with regard to Jewish refugees. Chen responded by saying: "If that is so, I will take care of the Foreign Ministry end, you just follow my orders!" Despite Chen's orders, Ho continued to issue the "life visas", leading for Chen to send chancellor Ding Wen to investigate a rumor that Ho was selling the visas, which would have been grounds for sacking Ho. Ding's investigation found no evidence that Ho was selling the visas, which he insisted that he was issuing only for altruistic reasons. In April 1939, Chen had a demerit entered into Ho's file, which made him ineligible for promotion within the Waichiaopu. In August 1939, the Japanese authorities announced that they would be imposing restrictions on Jews coming to Shanghai, but that did not stop Jews from travelling elsewhere with the Chinese visas.

In May 1940, Chen had Ho sacked as the Chinese consul in Vienna. Chen appointed Ding as the new consul in Vienna with orders to reduce the number of visas issued to Jewish refugees down to the "upmost minimal". The Chinese historian Gao Bei wrote that Ho was actually acting in accord with the Waichiaopu's policy with regard to Jewish refugees, and it was Chen was acting contrary to instructions. According to an interview with Chen's daughter, the reason why he was opposed to Ho issuing the "life visas" was because the visas were for the treaty port of Shanghai, China's largest city, which the Japanese had occupied in 1937. Through the Chinese government did not control the Chinese section of Shanghai, it was known that living conditions under Japanese rule were precarious, and Chen seemed to have believed having Jewish refugees settle in the city would only add to its troubles. In addition, the British ambassador to Germany, Sir Nevile Henderson, was opposed to Jewish refugees going to Shanghai. Henderson believed that the Jewish refugees would end up in the International Settlement of Shanghai, and appears to have leaned on Chen on this matter.

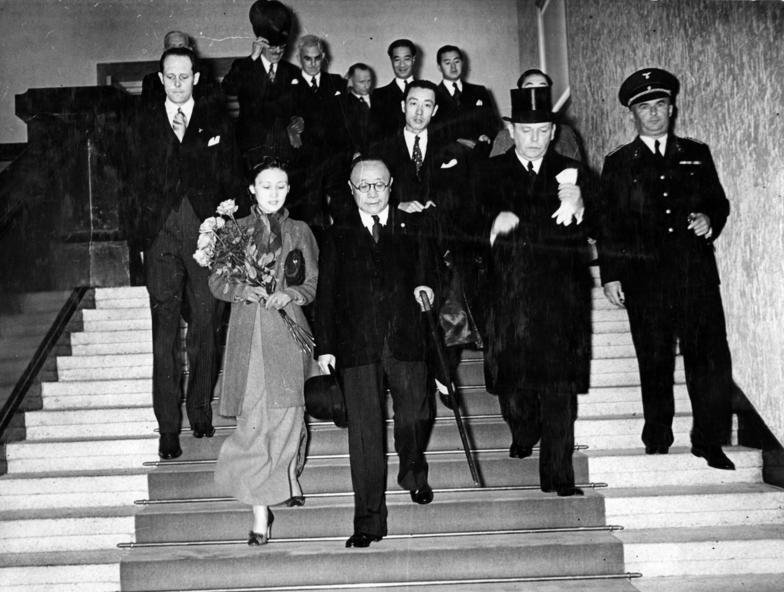
Chen arrives in Berlin, 21 September 1938

After the signing of the Tripartite Pact linking together Japan, Italy and Germany, the German Foreign Minister Joachim von Ribbentrop summoned Chen for a meeting, telling him: "If China does not negotiate peace with Japan quickly, Japan will recognize the Wang regime". Ribbentrop further threatened to have Germany recognize the Wang Jingwei regime, saying that "then China's situation will be even more difficult". As an inducement, Ribbentrop promised "if China negotiates peace with Japan and joins the Axis, Germany can guarantee that Japan will faithfully implement its peace terms". On 1 July 1941, Germany broke off diplomatic relations with China to recognize the Japanese puppet government of Wang Jingwei, causing Chen to leave Berlin.

In September 1943, Chen became the Chinese ambassador to Brazil . On 6 September 1943, he presented his letters of credentials to President Getúlio Vargas at the Catete Palace. In 1944, Chen became the Chinese ambassador to Mexico. In 1943, China and Mexico decided to upgrade their relations from the legation to the embassy level. Thus, when Chen arrived at the Palacio Nacional to present his letters of credentials to President Manuel Ávila Camacho, it was as the first ever Chinese ambassador to Mexico. On 15 August 1945, Chen hosted a lavish banquet at the embassy to celebrate the news that Japan had surrendered. In 1945, he became the Chinese ambassador to Argentina, a post that he was still holding at the time of his death.

== Books ==
- Eber, Irene (2012). Wartime Shanghai and the Jewish Refugees from Central Europe Survival, Co-Existence, and Identity in a Multi-Ethnic City. Berlin: De Gruyter. ISBN 9783110268188.
- Gao, Bei (2013). Shanghai Sanctuary Chinese and Japanese Policy Toward European Jewish Refugees During World War II. Oxford: Oxford University Press. ISBN 9780199840908.
- González, Fredy (2017). Paisanos Chinos Transpacific Politics Among Chinese Immigrants in Mexico. Los Angeles: University of California Press. ISBN 9780520964488.
- Ho, Monte (2005). Several Worlds: Reminiscences and Reflections of a Chinese-American Physician. Singapore: World Scientific. ISBN 9812564098.
- Ho, Feng-Shan (2010). My Forty Years as a Diplomat. Pittsburg: Dorrance Publishing. ISBN 1434970612.
- Moulin, Pierre (2007). Dachau, Holocaust, and US Samurais Nisei Soldiers First in Dachau?. Bloomington: AuthorHouse. ISBN 9781425938017.
- Paldiel, Mordecai (2007). Diplomat Heroes of the Holocaust. New York: Ktav Publishing. ISBN 9780881259094.
- Presseisen, Ernst Leopold (1958). Germany and Japan A Study in Totalitarian Diplomacy 1933–1941. Leiden: Martinus Nijhoff Publishers.
- Tao, Wenzhao (2022). A History of China-U.S. Relations (1911–1949). Berlin: Springer Nature. ISBN 9811697124.
