= Wu Hongbo =

Chinese diplomat

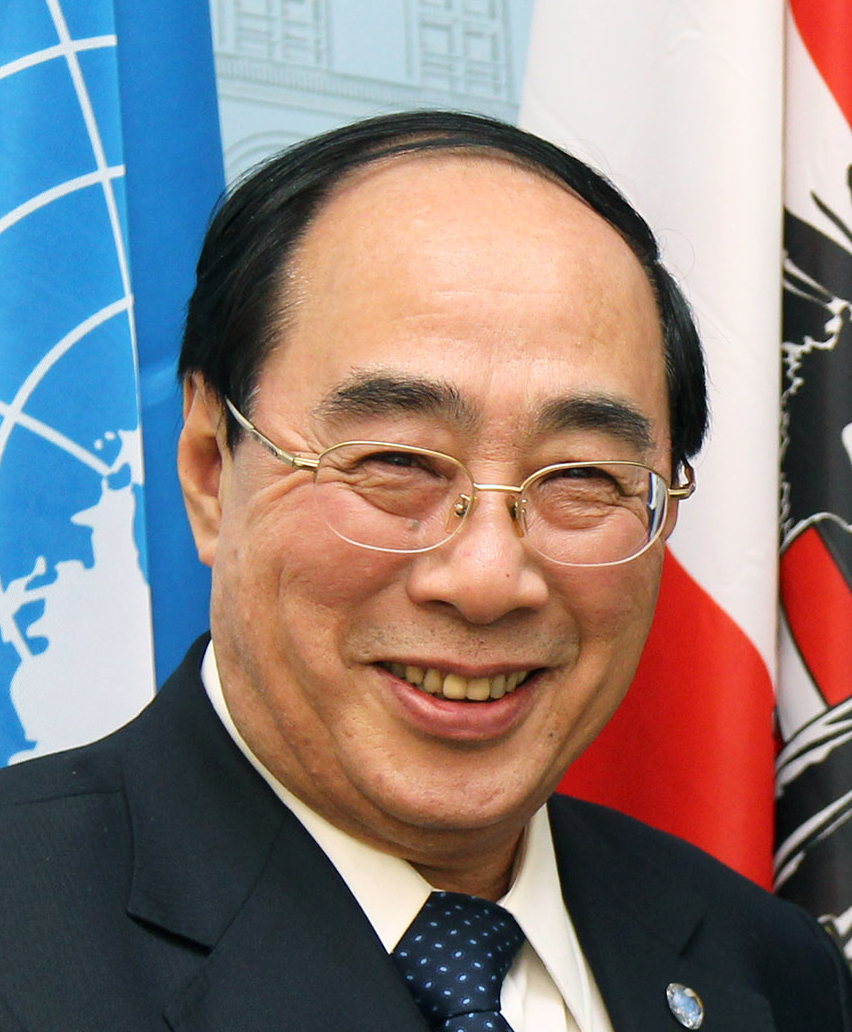
- Wu in December 2012

Special Representative of the Chinese Government for European Affairs
- In office 1 November 2019 – 4 February 2025
- Preceded by: Office established
- Succeeded by: Lu Shaye

United Nations Under Secretary-General for Economic and Social Affairs
- In office July 2012 – July 2017
- Secretary-General: Ban Ki-moon
- Preceded by: Sha Zukang
- Succeeded by: Liu Zhenmin

Chinese Ambassador to Germany
- In office August 2009 – July 2012
- Preceding: Ma Canrong
- Succeeded by: Shi Mingde

Chinese Ambassador to the Philippines
- In office March 2004 – October 2005
- Preceding: Wang Chungui
- Succeeded by: Li Jinjun

Assistant Minister of Foreign Affairs
- In office 2006–2009

Personal details
- Born: May 1952 (age 74) Shandong, China
- Education: Beijing Foreign Studies University; Victoria University of Wellington
- Occupation: Diplomat, UN official

Wu Hongbo (吴红波; Wú Hóngbō; born May 1952 in Shandong) is a Chinese diplomat who served as the special representative of the Chinese government for European affairs from November 2019 to February 2025.

Wu served as the Chinese ambassador to Germany from August 2009 to July 2012. From July 2012 to July 2017, he was the Under-Secretary-General in the United Nations Department of Economic and Social Affairs. He replaced Sha Zukang as the head of DESA.

== Biography ==
Wu Hongbo was born in May 1952 in Shandong. He obtained his degree from the English Department of the Beijing Foreign Languages Institute and commenced his career at the Ministry of Foreign Affairs in 1976 as a clerk in the Diplomatic Service Bureau in Beijing. In 1978, he attended Victoria University of Wellington in New Zealand for advanced studies. In 1980, he joined the staff of the Embassy of the People's Republic of China in New Zealand and returned in 1981 to serve as a clerk in the Diplomatic Service Bureau of the Ministry of Foreign Affairs of the People's Republic of China. In 1987, he assumed the role of Second Secretary and Deputy Director of the Hong Kong and Macao Work Office under the Ministry of Foreign Affairs. In 1988, he assumed the role of Second Secretary at the Chinese Representative Office of the Sino-British Joint Liaison Group. In 1991, he assumed the role of First Secretary and Director of the Hong Kong and Macau Work Office within the Ministry of Foreign Affairs. In 1995, he assumed the role of Representative for the Chinese contingent of the Sino-British Joint Liaison Group, holding the rank of Counselor. In 1997, he assumed the role of Counselor in the Commissioner's Office of the Ministry of Foreign Affairs in Hong Kong. In 1998, he assumed the role of Director of the Hong Kong and Macau Work Office within the Ministry of Foreign Affairs. In November 1998, he assumed the role of Chief Representative for the Chinese contingent of the Sino-British Joint Liaison Group, holding the rank of Ambassador. In 1999, he assumed the position of Deputy Director-General of the Western European Department of the Ministry of Foreign Affairs. In 2000, he assumed the role of Director-General of the Department of Hong Kong, Macao, and Taiwan Affairs of the Ministry of Foreign Affairs, and in August 2002, he was appointed Deputy Commissioner of the Office of the Commissioner of the Ministry of Foreign Affairs in Macao.

In March 2004, he was appointed Ambassador of the People's Republic of China to the Philippines. In October 2005, he assumed the role of Director of the General Office of the Ministry of Foreign Affairs. In 2007, he was elevated to Assistant Minister of the Ministry of Foreign Affairs, overseeing European Regional Affairs, Information, and Consular Affairs. In August 2009, he became Ambassador of the People's Republic of China to Germany. In May 2012, he was designated by United Nations Secretary-General Ban Ki-moon as United Nations Secretariat for Economic and Social Affairs, and in August 2012, he officially assumed this role. In November 2019, he became the first Special Representative of the Chinese Government for European Affairs.
