= Zhang Jun (ambassador) =

Chinese diplomat (born 1960)

His Excellency Zhang Jun
- 张军
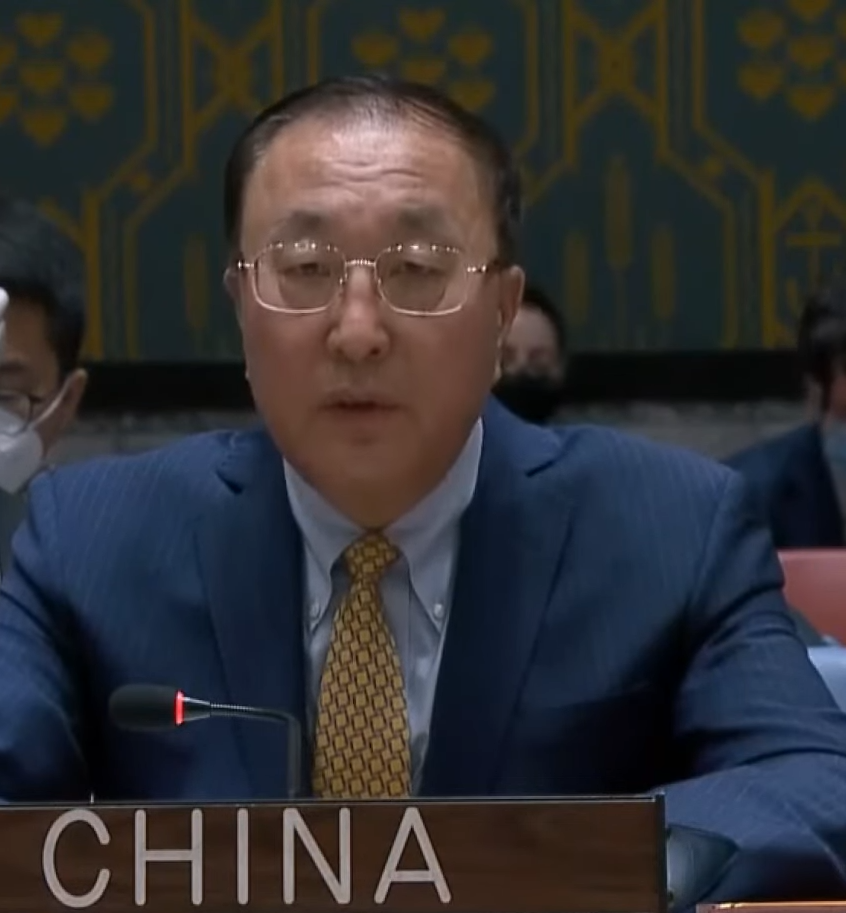
- Zhang in 2022

Permanent Representative of China to the United Nations
- In office 30 July 2019 – 31 March 2024
- Premier: Li Keqiang; Li Qiang
- Leader: Xi Jinping
- Preceded by: Ma Zhaoxu
- Succeeded by: Fu Cong

Personal details
- Born: 15 August 1960 (age 65) Changchun, Jilin, China
- Education: Jilin University (LLB); University of Hull (LLM)
- Website: chnun.chinamission.org.cn

Zhang Jun (Chinese: 张军, born 15 August 1960) is a Chinese diplomat, who has been serving as the 4th Secretary General of the Boao Forum for Asia since April 2024. He served as Permanent Representative of China to the United Nations from July 2019 to March 2024 and as Assistant Minister of Foreign Affairs of China from 2018 to 2019.

== Biography ==
Zhang was born in Changchun, Jilin province in 1960. He earned a Bachelor of Laws from Jilin University in China and a Master of Laws in international law from the University of Hull in the United Kingdom.

From 2007 to 2012, he was the Ambassador Extraordinary and Plenipotentiary of the People's Republic of China to the Kingdom of the Netherlands, and Permanent Representative to the Organisation for the Prohibition of Chemical Weapons. He was appointed to serve as the Permanent Representative of China to the United Nations in July 2019.

In March 2020, May 2021, August 2022, and November 2023, he served as President of the United Nations Security Council by assuming the monthly rotating role among Council members according to alphabetical order in the English language.

In August 2022, Zhang warned that US politician Nancy Pelosi should not visit Taiwan, threatening "This visit is provocative, and if [Pelosi] insists on making it then China will take firm and strong measures to safeguard our national sovereignty and territorial integrity. We allow no one to cross this red line."

He was appointed as a member of the 14th National Committee of the Chinese People's Political Consultative Conference on 17 January 2023 from the Friendship with Foreign Countries Sector. On 31 March 2024, he stepped down as permanent representative.

On 30 April 2024, he was appointed as the 4th secretary general of the Boao Forum for Asia.
