= Africa–China relations =

Bilateral relations between China and African states

- AU: China

Africa

China

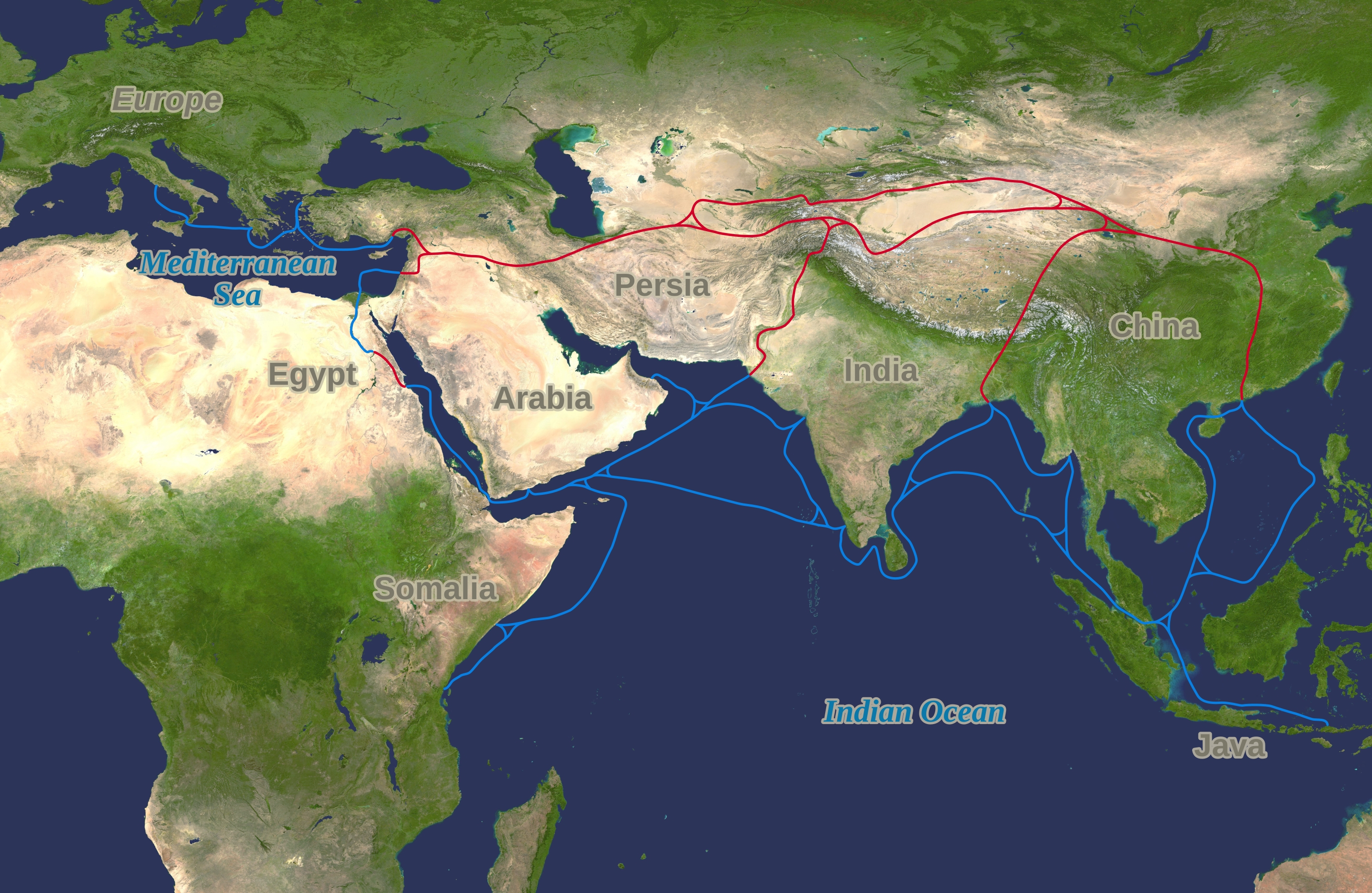
A map indicating trading routes used around the 1st century CE centred on the Silk Road

Africa–China relations, also referred to as Sino-African relations, Afro–Chinese relations and China–Africa relations, are the historical, political, economic, military, social, and cultural connections between China and Africa.

Little is known about ancient relations between China and Africa, though there is some evidence of early trade connections. Highlights of medieval contacts include the 14th-century journey of Moroccan scholar Ibn Battuta, the 14th-century visit of Somali scholar and explorer Sa'id of Mogadishu and the 15th-century Ming dynasty voyages of Chinese admiral Zheng He.

Modern political and economic relations between mainland China and the African continent commenced in the era of Mao Zedong, following the victory of the Chinese Communist Party (CCP) in the Chinese Civil War. At the turn of the 21st century, the modern state of the People's Republic of China (PRC) built increasingly strong economic ties with Africa.

In 1971, China received the support from 26 African nations in the UN to take over the seat from Taiwan. Chairman of the Chinese Communist Party Mao Zedong was grateful for the support and said, "It is our African brothers who have carried us into the UN". Today almost all African nations officially recognise the economically larger China (People's Republic of China) over Taiwan in search of economic advantage (aid, trade and FDI). As of 2026, Eswatini and the self-declared Republic of Somaliland are the only two African states to have official relations with Taiwan, although Eswatini is the only African UN member that officially recognizes the Republic of China rather than the People's Republic.

There have increasingly been closer political, security and economic ties between China and African nations. Trade between China and Africa increased by 700% during the 1990s, and China is currently Africa's largest trading partner. In 2000, the Forum on China–Africa Cooperation (FOCAC) was established as a forum between African countries and China.

The China Africa Research Initiative estimated that there were over 88,371 Chinese workers in Africa in 2022, down from a high of 263,696 in 2015.

== Historical relations ==
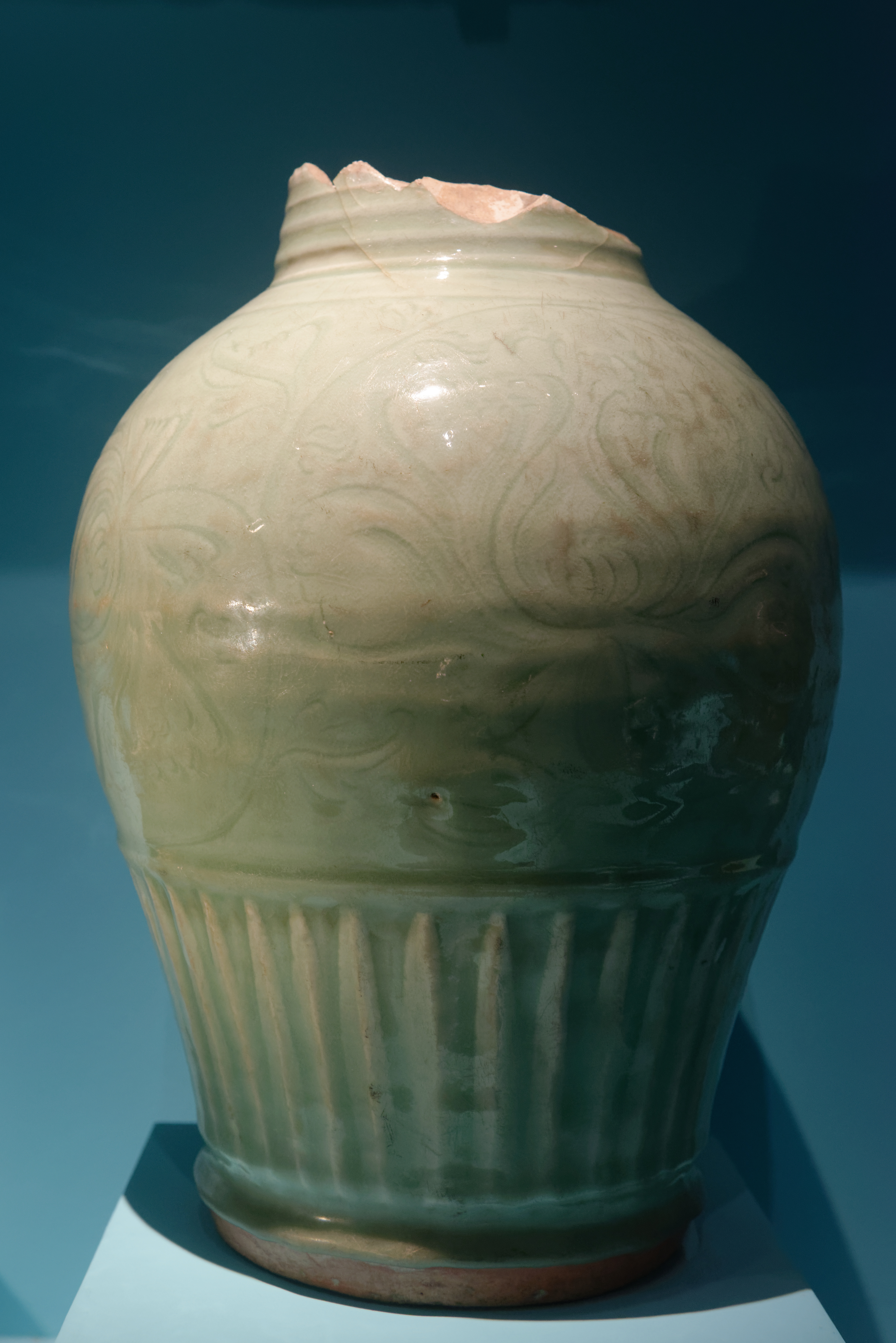
Yuan dynasty era Celadon vase from Mogadishu.

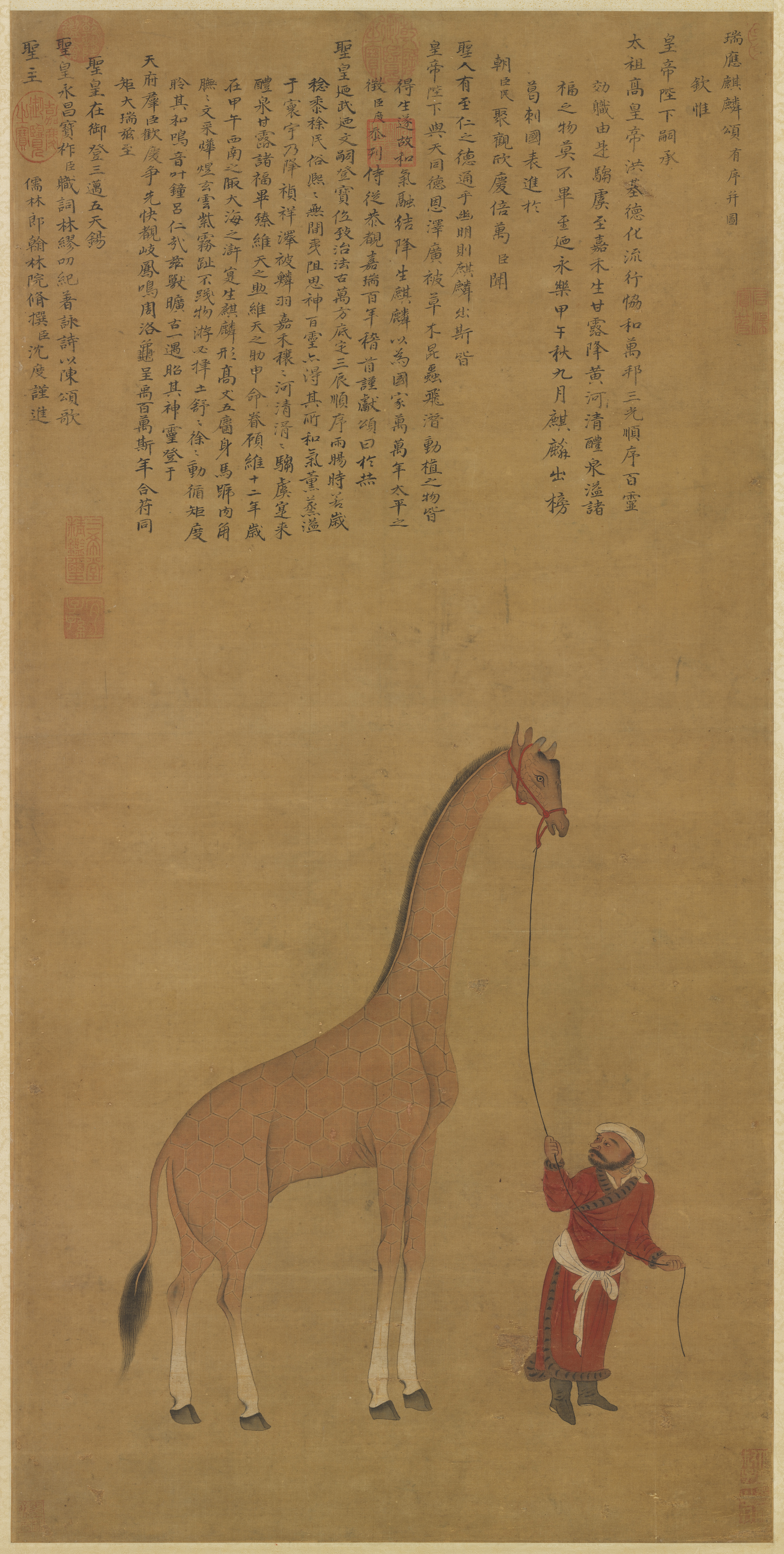
A giraffe brought from Somalia in the twelfth year of Yongle (AD 1415).

China and Africa have a history of trade relations, sometimes through third parties, dating back as far as 202 BC and 220 AD. Ptolemy, writing in Roman Egypt in the second century, knew of China by two separate routes: the Silk Road and the Indian Ocean trade. He identified two Chinese peoples: the Seres or silk people and the Sinai of the southern trade, whose name probably derives from the Qin dynasty.

The first mention of Africa in Chinese sources was in the Yu-yang-tsa-tsu by Tuan Ch'eng-shih (died 863), a compendium of general knowledge where he wrote about the land of Po-pa-li (Berbera).

In 1071, an embassy arrived in China from an unidentified East African kingdom. Since it was a formal tribute mission (in the eyes of the Chinese), it is described in the official History of the Song Dynasty. The name of the kingdom was Ts'eng t'an and it was said to lie inland and mint its coin. This name is probably derived from the Persian Zangistan, and the title of its ruler, a-mei-lo a-mei-lan is probably derived from the Persian amir-i-amiran (emir of emirs).

Archaeological excavations at Mogadishu in the Ajuran Empire and Kilwa, Tanzania have recovered many coins from China. The majority of the Chinese coins date back to the Song dynasty, although the Ming dynasty and Qing dynasty are also represented, according to Richard Pankhurst. In 1226, Chao Jukua, the commissioner of foreign trade at Quanzhou in the Fujian province of China, completed his Chu-fan-chih (Description of Barbarous Peoples) which discusses Zanzibar (Ts'ong-pa) and Somalia (Pi-P'a-Lo).

Giraffes, zebras, and incense were exported to the Ming dynasty of China, making Somalis merchants leaders in the commerce between Asia and Africa while influencing the Chinese language in Somalia in the process.

In the 14th century, Moroccan traveler and scholar, Ibn Battuta, made a long journey to Africa and Asia. He reached China in April 1345 after a stay in India before serving as an envoy of Sultan Muhammad Tughlaq of the Indian Tughlaq dynasty to China. He wrote:

China is the safest, best regulated of countries for a traveler. A man may go by himself on a nine-month journey, carrying with him a large sum of money, without any fear. Silk is used for clothing even by poor monks and beggars. Its porcelains are the finest of all makes of pottery and its hens are bigger than geese in our country.

The 14th-century visit of Sa'id of Mogadishu, the Somali scholar and explorer was another point of Medieval contact between Africa and China.

The Ming dynasty admiral, Zheng He, and his fleet rounded the coast of Somalia and followed the coast down to the Mozambique Channel. The goal of those expeditions was to spread Chinese culture and display Chinese strength. Zheng brought gifts and granted titles from the Ming emperor to local rulers. In October 1415, Zheng He reached the eastern coast of Africa and sent the first of two giraffes as gifts to the Chinese Yongle Emperor.

Other accounts mention Chinese ships sinking near Lamu Island in Kenya in 1415. Survivors are said to have settled on the island and married local women.

Archaeologists have found Chinese porcelains made during the Tang dynasty (618–907) in Kenyan villages; however, these were believed to have been brought over by Zheng He during his fifteenth-century ocean voyages. On Lamu Island off the Kenyan coast, local oral tradition maintains that twenty shipwrecked Chinese sailors, possibly part of Zheng's fleet, washed up on shore there hundreds of years ago. Given permission to settle by local tribes after having killed a dangerous python, they converted to Islam and married local women. Now, they are believed to have just six descendants remaining there. In 2002, DNA tests conducted on one of the women confirmed that she was of Chinese descent. Her daughter, Mwamaka Sharifu, later received a PRC government scholarship to study traditional Chinese medicine (TCM) in China.

National Geographic published an article by Frank Viviano in July 2005 about his visit to Pate Island. During his time on Lamu, ceramic fragments had been found which the administrative officer of the local Swahili history museum claimed were of Chinese origin, specifically from Zheng He's voyage to East Africa. The eyes of the Pate people resembled Chinese, and Famao and Wei were among the names, which were speculated to be of Chinese origin. Their ancestors were said to have been indigenous women who intermarried with Chinese Ming sailors when they were shipwrecked. Two places on Pate were called "Old Shanga", and "New Shanga", which the Chinese sailors had named. A local guide, who claimed to be of Chinese descent, showed Viviano a graveyard made out of coral on the island, indicating that they were graves of Chinese sailors, which the author described as "virtually identical", to Chinese Ming dynasty tombs, complete with "half-moon domes" and "terraced entries".

Archaeologists have discovered glass beads and porcelain from China inside Great Zimbabwe, a medieval stone city located in present-day Zimbabwe.

According to Melanie Yap and Daniel Leong Man in their book "Colour, Confusions, and Concessions: the History of Chinese in South Africa", Chu Ssu-pen, a Chinese mapmaker in 1320, had southern Africa drawn on one of his maps. Ceramics found in Zimbabwe and South Africa dated back to the Song dynasty. Some tribes to Cape Town's north claimed descent from Chinese sailors during the thirteenth century. Their physical appearance is similar to Chinese with paler skin and a Mandarin-sounding tonal language. Their name for themselves is "abandoned people", Awatwa in their language.

== Contemporary relations ==
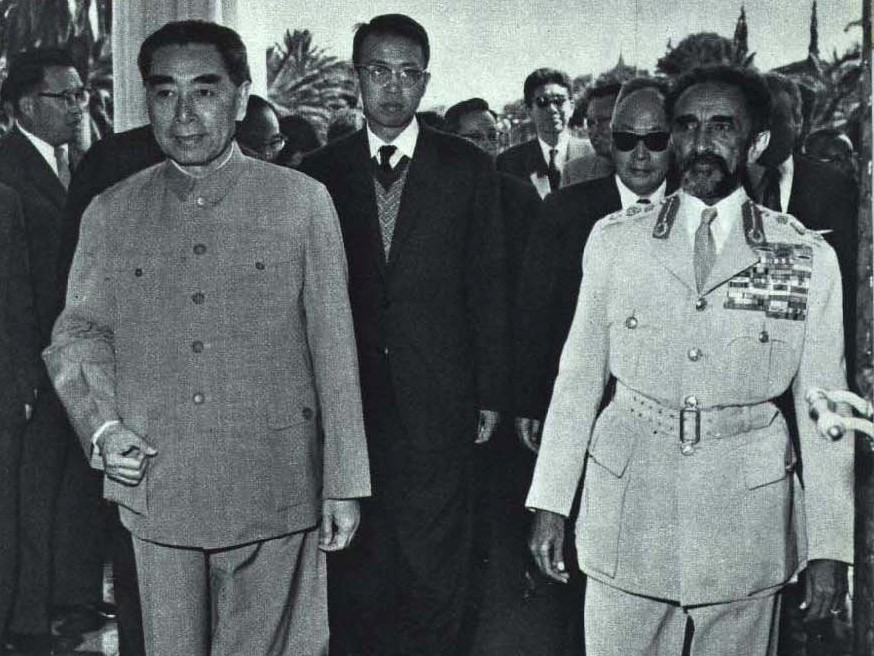
In the 1960s, the People's Republic of China established diplomatic relationships with a host of African countries in quick succession. Pictured is Premier Zhou Enlai meeting with Emperor Haile Selassie on a visit to Ethiopia in 1964.

The establishment of modern China-African relations began in the late 1950s, when China signed bilateral trade agreements with Algeria, Egypt, Guinea, South Africa, and Sudan. Chinese Premier Zhou Enlai made a ten-country tour of Africa between December 1963 and January 1964. Zhou Enlai visited Ghana and established close relations with Kwame Nkrumah, who desired a united Africa. Relations at that time often reflected China's foreign policy in general: China "began to cultivate ties and offer...economic, technical and military support to African countries and liberation movements in an effort to encourage wars of national liberation and revolution as part of an international united front against both superpowers".

Mao Zedong viewed Africa (along with Latin America) as the "First Intermediate Zone," in which China's status as a non-white power might enable it to compete with and supersede both United States and Soviet Union influence.

China works hard to cultivate favorable votes from African countries at the United Nations. It has often been successful, and the voting pattern of the Africa countries which rotate on the Security Council and African members of the Human Rights Council generally align more frequently with China than with the United States, France, and the United Kingdom. The General Assembly votes of African countries and China have also generally aligned.

From the Chinese perspective, collaboration with the African Union and African subregional bodies (such as ECOWAS, SADC, and COMESA) is attractive because these bodies function largely independent of Western influence. China and the Southern African Development Community (SADC) have a long-standing relationship and China provides the SADC with an annual $100,000 grant to help fund its Secretariat.

=== Diplomacy ===
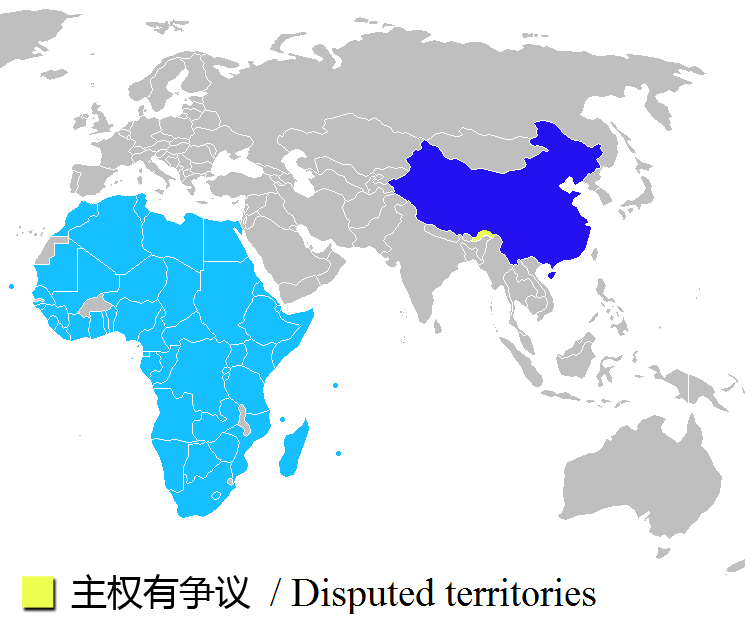
Members of FOCAC

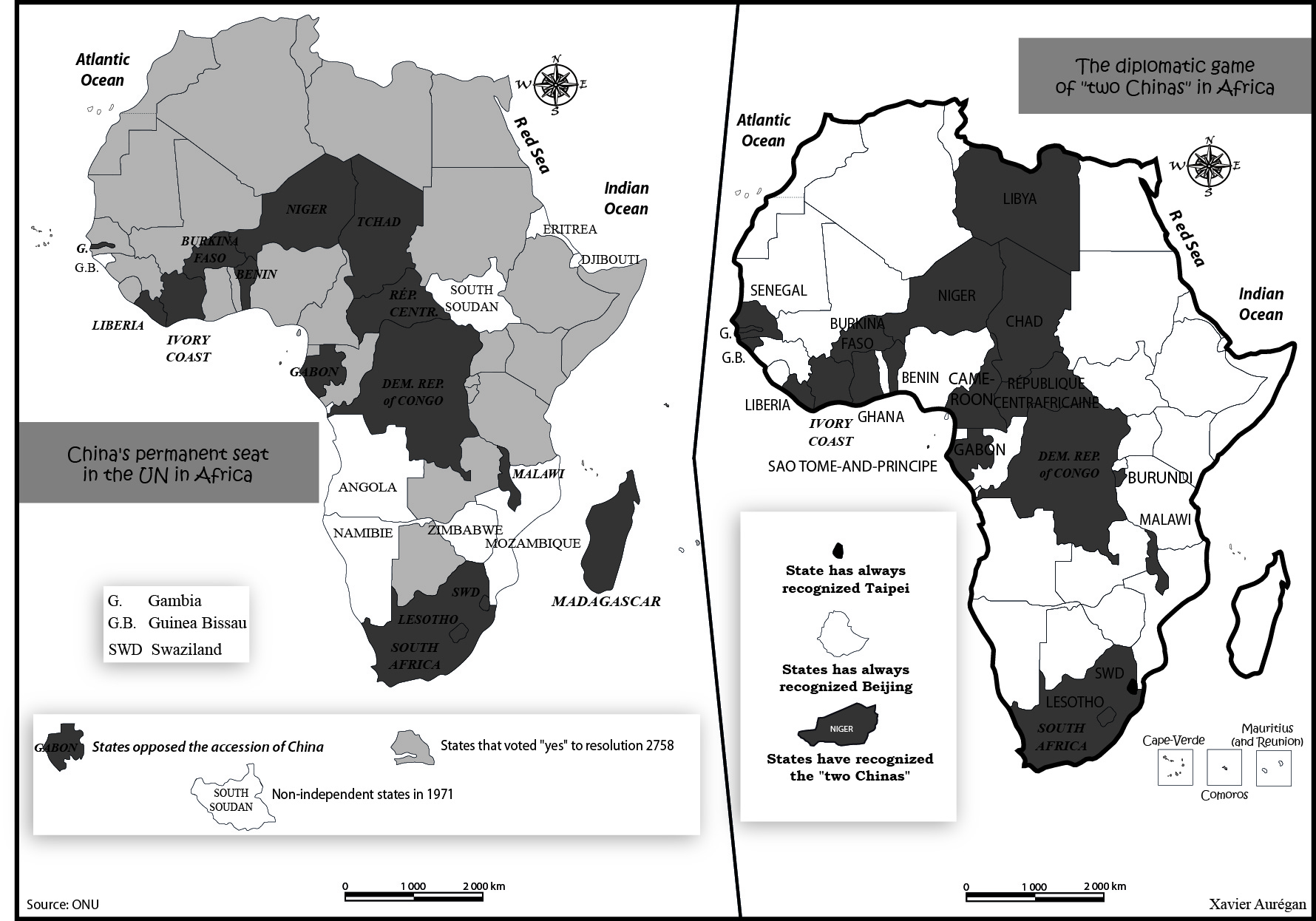
China's permanent seat in the UN in Africa and the diplomatic maneuvers of "two Chinas" in Africa

Early modern bilateral relations were mainly affected by the Cold War and communist ideology. Following the Mao era and continuing as of at least 2023, China seeks relationships with African governments and political parties on the basis of political and security reliability, rather than with regard to ideological ties.

China originally had close ties with the anti-apartheid and liberation movement, African National Congress (ANC), in South Africa, but as China's relations with the Soviet Union deteriorated and the ANC moved closer to the Soviet Union, China shifted away from the ANC towards the Pan-Africanist Congress. The Soviets supported Joshua Nkomo's Zimbabwe African People's Union, and supplied them with arms; Robert Mugabe's attempts to gain Soviet support for his Zimbabwe African National Union were rebuffed, leading him to enter into relations with China. China adopted several principles, among them was the support of the independence of African countries while investing in infrastructure projects.

In the 1970s, the expulsion of Soviet military advisers from Egypt and Sudan was welcomed with arms supplied by China. China, Zaire, and Safari Club (an alliance of intelligence services) shared a common goal in Africa: to curb Soviet influence in the area. Accordingly, both Zaire and China covertly funneled aid to the National Front for the Liberation of Angola (FNLA) (and later, UNITA) to prevent the People's Movement for the Liberation of Angola (MPLA), which was supported and augmented by Cuba, from coming to power. China and Safari Club sent assistance to support the Mobutu regime during the Shaba I conflict in 1977.

The Somali Democratic Republic established good relations with the Soviet Union throughout the Cold War era. When Somalia sought to create a Greater Somalia, it declared war on Ethiopia and took the Ogaden region in three months with Soviet aid. When the Soviet Union shifted its support from Somalia to Ethiopia, the latter retook the Ogaden. This angered Somali President, Siad Barre, who expelled all Soviet advisors and citizens from Somalia. China and Safari Club supported Somalia diplomatically and with token military aid.

The Forum on China-Africa Cooperation (FOCAC), first officially held in Beijing in 2006, following two major ministerial conferences in Beijing and Addis Ababa in 2000 and 2003, is a triennial high-level forum between China and the African nations. FOCAC is the primary multi-lateral coordination mechanism between African countries and China. At the 2018 FOCAC summit, General Secretary of the Chinese Communist Party Xi Jinping emphasized the "Five Nos" which guide its foreign policy in dealing with African countries and other developing countries: (1) non-interference in other countries' pursuit of development paths suitable to their national conditions, (2) non-interference in domestic affairs, (3) not imposing China's will on others, (4) not attaching political conditions to foreign aid, and (5) not seeking political self-interest in investment and financing.

In May 2016, ten African countries signed a declaration during a meeting of the China-Arab States Cooperation Forum (CASCF) which expressed appreciation for China's efforts to resolve its maritime and territorial disputes through dialogue and negotiation. The declaration also stated that the United Nations Convention on the Law of the Sea signatories should have the right to choose their own approach to resolving maritime issues.

Various subregional multilateral groups in Africa, including the Economic Community of West African States (ECOWAS) and the East African Community (EAC) also engage with China.

Wafula Okumu of Pambazuka News wrote in 2005 that for a permanent UN seat for Africa, Nigeria, the largest African country, relied on Chinese support while Egypt looked to the U.S. for backing.

In 2022, the African Union announced its move to establish a delegation with a resident Ambassador to Beijing, China.

From 1991 until at least 2023, each Chinese foreign minister's first overseas visit of the year has been to an African country. In its relations with African countries, China has shown a willingness to grant diplomatic audiences at the highest levels to even delegations from the smaller African countries.

As of 2024, China spends approximately US$1 billion on public diplomacy to Africa in the areas of media, education, and culture.

==== Foreign policy ====
===== China policy towards Africa =====
China's foreign policy towards Africa upon the founding of the People's Republic of China was based on Beijing's "Five Principles of Peaceful Co-existence": a) national sovereignty, b) win-win co-operation, c) mutual non-aggression and non-alignment, d) neutrality and non-interference in internal affairs, and e) equality. Throughout the 1960, China deployed formal and informal foreign policy instruments. Formal instruments included friendship treaties, cultural pacts, financial and technical assistance. When Deng Xiaoping replaced Mao Zedong as China's paramount leader in the late 1970s, his foreign policy focused on establishing co-operative relations with the West. Consequently, Africa lost much of its geopolitical significance to China. Shortly after 1989 however, Beijing relaunched a diplomatic offensive in Africa marked by high-level official visits and increased aid to Africa.

In 1996, Jiang Zemin toured Africa. Following the tour, China signed 20 agreements with African countries on trade, economics, technical, and cultural cooperation.

During the Hu-Wen administration, diplomatic engagement with Africa was framed as part of an effort to build a "Harmonious Society".

The relationship has since grown exponentially with China's foreign policy towards Africa currently shaped by its broader Belt and Road Initiative. During the Xi Jinping administration, China has framed its relations with African countries as part of a focus on major-country diplomacy and building a "community with a shared future for humankind."

===== African foreign policies towards China =====
Africa, particularly sub-Saharan Africa's relationship towards China has been marked by both friendship and friction. African governments are mostly pro-China, whereas civil society tend to be alarmed by the impacts of environmental degradation, wildlife loss and exploitation of local workers, etc. associated with Chinese migrants in African countries.

==== Taiwan ====
The political status of Taiwan has been a key political issue for the People's Republic of China (PRC). In 1971, the support of African nations was crucial in the PRC's joining the United Nations (UN), taking over the seat of the ROC on Taiwan. Many African countries, such as Algeria, Egypt, Ethiopia, and Zambia have stressed their support for a "one-China policy". Only one African country, Eswatini, still maintains relations with Taipei. All African countries except Eswatini recognize the People's Republic of China as the sole government of China and Taiwan as an integral part of China's territory, and support all efforts by the PRC to "achieve national reunification".

==== Xinjiang ====
African countries have generally defended China's treatment of its Muslim minorities. All African countries except Eswatini consider Xinjiang to be China's internal affairs. In July 2019, UN ambassadors of 37 countries, including Algeria, Angola, Cameroon, Congo, DRC, Egypt, Eritrea, Nigeria, Somalia, South Sudan, Sudan, Zimbabwe, and other African states, signed a joint letter to the United Nations Human Rights Council (UNHRC) defending China's treatment of Uyghurs and other Muslim minority groups in the Xinjiang. Algeria, Burkina Faso, Republic of Congo, Djibouti, Nigeria, Somalia, and Zambia were among the 16 countries that defended China's policies in Xinjiang in 2019 but did not do so in 2020.

In 2021, ambassadors from Burkina Faso, Republic of Congo, and Sudan made statements in support of China's Xinjiang policies. African countries which are members of the UNHRC had a significant impact in narrowly defeating a proposal in October 2022 by that body to debate human rights in Xinjiang. Somalia was the only African UNHRC member voting in favor of debate.

==== Hong Kong ====
All African countries except Eswatini consider Hong Kong to be China's internal affairs. Several African countries expressed support for the Chinese government during the 2019–2020 Hong Kong protests. In October 2019, Uganda's Ministry of Foreign Affairs issued a statement that Uganda "firmly supports the one country, two systems policy of the People's Republic of China on the matter of Hong Kong and other areas" and that "Hong Kong's affairs are China's domestic affairs." Also in October 2019, Tanzania's chief government spokesperson stated that the country supports China's one country, two systems policy, that the Hong Kong government was taking the best approach to the situation, and that other countries should support China. In January 2020, Namibia's land reform minister stated that Namibia fully supports Chinese territorial integrity and sovereignty, including with respect to Hong Kong. In June 2020, 53 countries, mostly in Africa, declared their support for the Hong Kong national security law at the UNHRC.

==== Tibet ====
All African countries except Eswatini have declared issues of Tibetan sovereignty to be a Chinese internal matter.

==== Party-to-party relations ====
The International Department of the Chinese Communist Party has served as the principal body coordinating party-to-party relations between African countries and China.

In February 2022, the Mwalimu Julius Nyerere Leadership School opened in Tanzania, with US$40 million in funding by the Central Party School of the Chinese Communist Party. The school was jointly established with the support of the six ruling parties of Tanzania, South Africa, Mozambique, Angola, Namibia, and Zimbabwe.

=== Economic relations ===
China's economic interests in Africa have dramatically increased since the 1990s. In 1980, the total China-African trade volume amounted to US$1 billion. In 1999, it was US$6.5 billion and US$10 billion in 2000. By 2005, the total Africa–China trade volume had reached US$39.7 billion before jumping to US$55 billion in 2006, making China the second-largest trading partner of Africa after the United States, which had US$91 billion in trade with African nations. The PRC also passed its traditional African economic partner and former colonial power, France, which had trade worth US$47 billion. In 2010, trade between Africa and China was valued at US$114 billion and US$166.3 billion in 2011. By 2022, total trade grew to US$282 billion. China has been Africa's largest trading partner since 2009 when it surpassed the United States, and continues to be by far its largest trading partner as of 2022. As of 2024, Africa makes up less than 5% of China's global trade.

During the year 2011, trade between Africa and China increased 33% from the previous year to US$166 billion. This included Chinese imports from Africa equaling US$93 billion, consisting largely of mineral ores, petroleum, and agricultural products, and Chinese exports to Africa totaling US$93 billion, consisting largely of manufactured goods. Trade between the regions also increased further by over 22% year-over-year to US$80.5 billion in the first five months of the year 2012. Imports from Africa were up 25.5% to $49.6 billion during these first five months of 2012 and exports of Chinese-made products, such as machinery, electrical and consumer goods and clothing/footwear increased 17.5% to reach $30.9 billion.

As China began a new town construction boom around 2010, the Chinese government and state-owned enterprises began developing new towns with African governments, including Angola, South Africa, Congo, Ethiopia, and Rwanda. Angola's Quilamba city (developed by CITIC Group) is the largest development of this kind.

Findings from 2017 estimate there are in excess of 10,000 Chinese corporations doing business in Africa, the value of which amounts to more than $2 trillion. The majority of these companies are private multinational corporations investing in China's infrastructure, energy, and banking sectors. Investments from Chinese entrepreneurial migration have culminated in positive (indirect jobs) and negative (displacing local traders) effects in local African societies.

In 2008, one-third of China's oil supplies came from the African continent, mainly from Angola. Investments of Chinese companies in the energy sector reached US$78.1 billion in 2019. In some cases, as in Nigeria and Angola, oil and gas exploration and production deals crossed $2 billion.

In agriculture, Benin and the Sahel countries of Burkina Faso and Mali supply up to 20% of China's cotton needs. While Côte d'Ivoire supplies China with cocoa, from US$39.7 million in 2001 to $113.5 million in 2005, the most significant African provider of coffee is Ethiopia.

The need to protect China's increased investments in Africa has driven a shift away from China's traditional non-interference in the internal matters of other countries to new diplomatic and military initiatives to try to resolve unrest in South Sudan and Mali.

During the December 2015 FOCAC meeting in Johannesburg, South Africa, China's paramount leader Xi Jinping pledged $60 billion over three years in loans and assistance to the African continent. The stated aim of China's effort was to support factories manufacturing goods for export. Along with roads and ports, Nigerian President Muhammadu Buhari showed his desire to finish stalled railway projects along the coastline, specifically a 1,400 km railway from Lagos to Calabar representing approximately 200,000 jobs.

A 2020 report synthesizing close to a hundred studies on Africa–China economic relations finds that economic engagement with China supported Africa's economic transformation. At the same time, criticism against China has been growing from labour unions and civil society groups about the "poor labor conditions, unsustainable environmental practices, and job displacement" caused by Chinese enterprises. According to RAND, China is also thought to be taking advantage of African governments' weaknesses, thereby encouraging corruption and wasteful decision-making.

Effective 1 December 2024, China eliminated tariffs for goods imported from all of the countries that the United Nations categorizes as least developed and with which China has diplomatic relations, including thirty-three African countries. In May 2026, China expanded its zero-tariff policy to cover 53 African countries, excluding only Eswatini due to its diplomatic relations with Taiwan. The expanded policy will remain in effect until 30 April 2028. China is the first major economy to offer unilateral duty-free access to Africa.

==== Communications infrastructure ====
Beginning in the late 1990s, Chinese national champions telecommunications company Huawei built significant amounts of telecommunications infrastructure in sub-Saharan Africa.

To improve commercial relationships and telecommunication services as part of the Belt and Road Initiative (BRI), significant investments in fiber networks have been undertaken. The PEACE Cable (Pakistan & East Africa Connecting Europe) is a 9,300 mile (12,000 km) submarine fiber optic cable owned by a subsidiary of the China-based Hengtong Group and supplied by Huawei Marine. It is expected to reach initial completion in 2021–2022. The Cable's landfall in Pakistan provide for low-latency overland connection to China. The Cable's route is around the Arabian Peninsula, first dividing north into the Red Sea, crossing land in Egypt and then proceeding through the Mediterranean to the Interxion MRS2 Data Center in Marseille, France. The southern fork extends along the east coast of Africa, which in Phase 2 will reach South Africa. Additional landfalls are in Cyprus, Djibouti, Somalia, Kenya, and Seychelles.

In August 2021, China announced more digital projects on the Continent in areas such as the digital economy, smart cities and 5G. These projects are thought to be part of the Digital Africa initiative that was proposed during a trip of Foreign Minister Wang Yi in Africa in 2020.

==== Aid and loans ====
China began its foreign aid program in with assistance to sub-Saharan and Middle Eastern countries. The first sub-Saharan African country to receive Chinese foreign aid was Guinea; the aid assisted Guinea in building its infrastructure following independence from France.

In the 1960s and 1970s, the Chinese government supported African Independence Movements and gave aid to newly independent African nations. China provided significant amounts of aid at a time when it had relatively little in the way of financial resources itself. Among the most notable early projects were the 1,860 km TAZARA Railway, linking Zambia and Tanzania, which China helped to finance and build from 1970 to 1975. Some 50,000 Chinese engineers and workers were sent to the continent to complete the project. By 1978, China was giving aid to more African countries than the United States.

China provides aid in the forms of debt forgiveness, aid grants, concessional loans, and interest-free loans, including through the Forum on China-Africa Cooperation (FOCAC). According to Marxist journalist Martin Jacques in his book When China Rules the World, Chinese aid is "far less restrictive and doctrinaire" and comes with fewer strings attached than Western aid. Unconditional and low-rate credit lines (rates at 1.5% over fifteen years to twenty years) have largely taken the place of more restrictive and conditional Western loans. The sole political condition China requires from aid recipients is recognition of the One China principle.

Following her interviews of African scholars and diplomats, U.S. Professor of International Securities Studies Dawn C. Murphy concludes that many African countries genuinely appreciate this moral stance by China against political conditions for foreign aid.

Estimates regarding the amount of African debt cancelled by China varies. Since 2000, over $10bn in debt owed by African nations to the PRC has been cancelled, according to Le Monde diplomatique. According to a 2020 report by the China Africa Research Initiative at Johns Hopkins, "China has only offered debt write-offs for zero-interest loans", which account for at least $3.4 billion of cancelled debt in Africa between 2000 and 2019.

Scott N. Romaniuk, a researcher at the University of Alberta's China Institute, cautioned that Africa should "beware of 'no strings attached'" regarding development financing from China. He said that China's low-interest loans have been used to trade for extraction rights of proven deposits of natural resources, constraining African countries' future use of these resources. Patrick Bond said, "the conditions on Chinese loans and investments become very clear when the recipient countries have a debt crisis".

In 2015, the China Africa Research Initiative identified 17 African countries with loans from China facing potential default. Kenyan economist Anzetse Were has argued that some African nations' narratives of Chinese debt-trap diplomacy stem from a lack of fiscal transparency and a weaker bargaining position vis-à-vis China.

Although several countries express concern that China has been engaging in debt-trap diplomacy to neo-colonise the continent; however, academics including Deborah Bräutigam have disputed those accusations. Following her review of available data, U.S. Air War College Professor Dawn C. Murphy concluded that calling China's behavior in Africa “neocolonial” is “an exaggeration and misrepresentation.” London School of Economics Professor Keyu Jin writes that the claim that China leads borrowers into a debt trap is misleading. Jin observes that the majority of BRI countries' debt is owed to international organizations or private Western institutions like hedge funds, rather than to China. Jin also writes that China has written off many of its loans and also provided debt relief to borrowers.

The China Africa Research Initiative reported that Chinese financiers loaned $153 billion to African public-sector borrowers between 2000 and 2019; at least or over 80 percent of those loans were used for economic and social infrastructure projects in the transport, power, telecom, and water sectors of underdeveloped and developing countries. A 2007 report published by International Rivers said that several infrastructure projects funded by Chinese loans, such as the Merowe Dam, had a positive impact on the economies of African countries.

As of 2021, China is estimated to hold at least 21% of all African debt. In August 2022, the Chinese foreign ministry announced that it would forgive 23 interest-free loans that matured at the end of 2021 to 17 unspecified African countries.

==== Health care ====
China has been engaged in a kind of "health diplomacy" towards Africa since the 1960s. Health care development and medical assistance have been among the chief areas of support. Between the early 1960s and 2005, more than 15,000 Chinese doctors travelled to Africa to help treat patients in more than 47 countries.

In 2001, the member nations of G8 formed the United Nations-backed Global Fund to Fight AIDS, Tuberculosis and Malaria with an initial budget of $10 billion. In 2007, another additional $1.1 billion was approved in Kunming, China, of which 66% was dedicated to Africa. In September of the same year, China promised the Democratic Republic of the Congo to build 31 hospital units and 145 smaller health care centres, a project due to be completed in March 2010.

During the 2014 Ebola epidemic, China provided financial donations, medical supplies and personnel to Sierra Leone, Ghana, Liberia, and Guinea.

China provided vaccines to African countries during the COVID-19 pandemic. As of November 2021, it had supplied 200 million vaccine doses to Africa, pledged to donate 600 million more doses, and pledged a further 400 million doses via other means such as joint Chinese-African production. China also sent medical teams to Algeria, Zimbabwe, and Nigeria.

==== African Centre for Disease Control ====
Under the Belt and Road Initiative, in 2023 the African Union along with the People's Republic of China is slated to open Phase-1 of the African continent's Centres for Disease Control and Prevention (CDCP) complex.

==== Agriculture ====
Since the mid-1990s, China has encouraged its agricultural enterprises to seek economic opportunities abroad as part of its go out policy.

Agricultural Technology Demonstration Centers are a major component of China's agricultural cooperation with African countries. The function of these centers is to transmit agricultural expertise and technology from China to developing countries in Africa while also creating market opportunities for Chinese companies in the agricultural sector. The Chinese government is motivated to establish these centers out of both an ideological commitment to fostering South-South cooperation with less developed countries and by a desire to increase food security.

China first announced its Agricultural Technology Demonstrations Centers at the 2006 meeting of the Forum on China-Africa Cooperation. It launched 19 of these centers between 2006 and 2018, all in sub-Saharan Africa. As of 2023, Agricultural Technology Demonstration Centers exist in 24 African countries.

=== Security ===
Military cooperation goes back to the Cold War period when China was keen to help African liberation movements. Eritrea's first president Isaias Afwerki, a leader in the fight for independence, received military training in China. Apart from some traditional allies such as Somalia and Tanzania, China also had military ties with non-aligned countries like Egypt. Military equipment worth $142 million was sold to African countries between 1955 and 1977. In July 2017, China set up its first overseas military base in Djibouti, which is a small town located in the Horn of Africa between the Gulf of Aden and the Red Sea, as a logistics facility for peacekeeping missions on the continent. Bertil Lintner, as well as various Indian analysts, have described the base in Djibouti as part of China's "String of Pearls" geopolitical and military strategy in the Indian Ocean.

Among the channels that China has used for security diplomacy with the African countries are the China-Africa Defense and Security Forum (established in 2018) and the China-Africa Peace and Security Forum (which first met in 2019).

The African countries and China also build military-to-military relations through military exchange visits. China generally prioritizes military-to-military exchanges in the security field, because it perceives military personnel as more effective interlocutors in this area than civilians.

According to academic Obert Hodzi, African countries often prefer China's approach to security norms and principles such as non-interventionism and respect for state sovereignty, which effectively limit Western influence in many African countries. David H. Shinn and academic Joshua Eisenman state that the Chinese principle of non-interventionism has long been well received by African countries both because of the historical experience of European colonialism, as well as the fact that many smaller countries often have concerns about outside interference with their sovereignty.

==== Peacekeeping missions ====
In 2004, China deployed around 1,500 military personnel between Liberia and the Democratic Republic of the Congo. Since 2011, it has sent infantry troops describable (arguably) as 'combat' forces.

In July 2007, China supported the passage of UN Security Council Resolution 1769 and contributed troops to African Union-United Nations Hybrid Operation in Darfur (UNAMID). China also has fourteen attachés in fourteen different African countries as of 2007, while eighteen African countries maintain attachés in Beijing.

==== Arms sales ====
Since the 1960s, when China provided small amounts of arms often free of charge to African rebels, liberation movements, and left-wing governments, China's transfer of arms has been an important component of its relations with African countries. Although measures of arms supplies vary, as of 2023 China is often regarded as the third most important source of arms to Africa.

An increasing number of African countries have shifted their source of munitions from traditional providers such as Russia to China due to the competitive prices offered by Chinese suppliers. It is estimated that between 2013 and 2017, Chinese arms imports to Africa totaled 17%, representing a 55% increase compared to the period covering 2009 to 2013. It also sold more arms than any other supplier, with sales to 23 African countries.

Arms sales by China to some African states have troubled critics who point out that some buyers like Sudan are accused of war crimes. Chinese-made drones, especially those made by the Chengdu Aircraft Industry Group, and China Aerospace Science and Technology Corporation, have been sold across Africa, and have been utilized in hundreds of attacks in Egypt, Libya, Yemen, and Nigeria.

Former U.S. military contractor Erik Prince's Frontier Services Group has close ties to the Chinese state-owned CITIC Group and provides security training services to Chinese firms operating in Africa.

==== Military training ====
When China trains African military personnel, it typically does so in China. In conjunction with the Confucius Institutes in Sudan and Democratic Republic of Congo, China has also developed Chinese language training programs for African military personnel.

==== Allegations of espionage ====
The African Union headquarters in Addis Ababa was built and fully funded by the Chinese government. Le Monde wrote that the Chinese government was alleged to have spied on the computer servers at the headquarters from 2012 to 2017. Chinese officials and African Union denied the accusation. African Union Chairman Moussa Faki described the allegations as "all lies" and stated that "no maneuvers could distract and divert us from our mission" of strengthening ties between the AU and China.

In 2018, the African Union replaced its servers.

In June 2019, the African Union Commission and Huawei signed a memorandum of understanding to further increase IT cooperation. Wang stated that the agreement should end rumors of data leakage and that "AU has totally audited their IT system for the whole organization and nothing corroborates what was said in media reports one year ago."

In 2020, Japan's Computer Emergency Response Team (CERT) reported that a suspected Chinese hacking organization dubbed "Bronze President" had hacked and extracted footage from the AU Headquarters' security cameras.

In 2024, academics from the University of Manchester noted that the allegations generated more interest in the global north countries than in Africa.

=== Space cooperation ===
Africa-China space cooperation occurs through a variety of channels, including through BRICS, the China-Brazil Earth Resource Satellite for Africa Program, the Arab Satellite Communications Organization, the China-Arab States BeiDou Global Satellite Navigation System, and the Disaster Monitoring Constellation, and the Belt and Road Initiative.

African countries are increasingly cooperating with China on satellite launches and specialized training. As of 2022, China has launched two satellites for Ethiopia, two for Nigeria, one for Algeria, one for Sudan, and one for Egypt.

The 2022-2024 action plan for FOCAC commits China to using space technology to enhance cooperation with African countries and to create centers for Africa-China cooperation on satellite remote sensing application.

== Culture ==
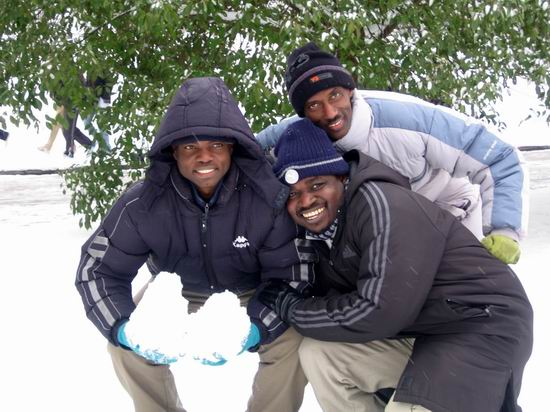
Foreign students at Huazhong Agricultural University, Wuhan

The first overseas Chinese cultural centre in Africa was opened in Mauritius in 1988. Two others followed in Egypt and Benin. The Confucius Institute has at least 54 locations across Africa, in addition to another 27 Confucius Classrooms in various countries (as of 2018).

Historically, little is known about early African immigration to China. As economic and political ties have strengthened, many Africans have relocated to China to seek better economic opportunities. Places dubbed 'Little Africa' and 'Chocolate City' are increasingly receiving new immigrants, mostly Nigerians. Most African immigrants, an estimated 20,000 individuals, are concentrated in the area of Guangzhou. An estimated 10,000 illegal African immigrants were in China as of 2009, with police crackdowns intensifying in that period.

In contrast, early Chinese immigration to the African continent is slightly better documented. In 1724, a few Chinese convicts were brought as laborers to South Africa from the Dutch East Indies (modern-day Indonesia) by the colonial Dutch Empire. In the early nineteenth century, another wave of immigrants were brought to South Africa by the British to work in agriculture, infrastructure building, and mining. In recent years, there has been an increasing presence of Chinese in Africa with one estimate numbering Chinese nationals at one million.

China has also been increasingly involved in sport in Africa. Since 1970, Chinese-owned companies have been building sports stadiums throughout most African countries. Each project costs dozens of millions of dollars, a fee that China gives as a soft loan. The stadiums strengthen China's diplomatic and commercial ties with African countries. African governments accept China's loans because they enable them to promote development projects. On the other hand, concerns have been raised as to the working conditions at these stadiums. Also, some of the stadiums turned out to be white elephants given their meager usage.

=== Film and television ===
==== Chinese broadcasting and film screenings in Africa ====
The Chinese government has funded various projects and companies with a focus on localizing and distributing Chinese film throughout Africa. The first China-African film festival, the Egyptian Film Week, took place in 1957. In 1957 in Cairo the first Chinese Film Week was also organized. In 2019 the first Pan-African Online Film Festival was launched.

In 2002 StarTimes was authorized by the Chinese Ministry of Commerce to start development out of China. Its first operator license was obtained in Rwanda in 2007, and it became known for providing cheaper packages to viewers. StarTimes now has chapters in over 30 countries. In 2018 StarTimes began producing its own content. These were first launched in Nigeria before becoming available to other African countries.

Since 2006 the importance of Chinese investment in African media has been "in all the action plans of the Forum on China-Africa Cooperation." On January 11, 2012, China Central Television opened CCTV-Africa (now CGTN Africa) in Nairobi, Kenya. As of the late 2010s, CGTN Africa continues to struggle against competitors like the BBC and Al Jazeera for ratings. The China-Africa Film and Television Cooperation project, launched in 2012, was founded with the goal of translating and distributing Chinese film and television. Annually the group translates ten series and 52 films into seven African languages.

Some academics have criticized these efforts as an attempt to bolster the Chinese government's influence through employment of soft power. Academic Haina Jin describes these projects as "a reflection of the eagerness on the part of Chinese institutions for increasing the international presence of Chinese films and television dramas and exporting Chinese culture to the world." Other academics, such as Wanning Sun, argues that increasing soft power through film is impossible due to the Chinese government's "top down" style of influence. Academics, such as Julia Strauss, have taken issue with the discussion of soft power as overly simplistic.

==== Chinese Film and Television Set in Africa ====
In 2016 Beijing Huanying Shidai Media released the film Ultimate Hero. The film takes place in a fictional African country named Tukaga. The film grossed CN¥4.5 million at the box office. Yong Zhang and Yiwen Xia describe the film as "making the African setting just a superficial gimmick," which then "failed [...] as an African-themed film."

Wolf Warrior 2, released in China on July 27, 2017; is set in an unnamed Africa country. Filmed in 2016, a majority of the shooting on location was done in South Africa, in cities such as Soweto and Alexandria. The film grossed CN¥5.68 billion at the box office, the equivalent $874 million. While the film has been praised for presenting "a lively imagine of Chinese people in Africa rarely seen in Hollywood-dominated portrayals," it has also been criticized as depicting "nearly all negative stereotypes of Africa," such as child abuse, abject poverty, widespread disease, and government corruption.

In 2011 the show A Beautiful Daughter-in-Law Era premiered in Tanzania. The first Chinese series dubbed into Swahili, the show became a hit. It was referenced by Xi Jinping in a speech in Tanzania on March 25, 2013.

=== Migration ===
Many Chinese men who engaged in gold mining in Ghana married local Black African Ghanaian women and had children with them and then the Ghana government deported illegal miners, leaving the mixed race Chinese fathered children stranded in Ghana while their fathers were sent back to China.

Many Ugandan women have been marrying Chinese businessmen who moved to Uganda.

New interest in Kenya's natural resources has attracted over $1 billion of investment from Chinese firms. This has propelled new development in Kenya's infrastructure with Chinese firms bringing in their own male workers to build roads.

In Kenya, there is a trend of the following influx of Chinese male workers in Kenya with a growing number of abandoned babies of Chinese men who fathered children with local women, causing concern.

=== Racism ===
Human rights and advocacy groups for Africans in China have criticized the use of blackface performances on Chinese television, particularly on the CCTV New Year's Gala.

The expansion of Chinese companies and their investments in Africa has raised issues of Chinese racism against the local population. For example, after a video shot by a Kenyan worker whose Chinese boss referred to Kenyans as "monkeys" went viral in 2018, more examples of discrimination by Chinese nationals in the country, such as separated bathrooms, have emerged.

Around April 2020, African nationals in Guangzhou were being evicted from their homes by local police and told to leave, with no place to sleep, amidst some recent Chinese news articles negatively reporting on Nigerians in the city. The reports of discrimination created controversy in Africa damaging Africa–China relations, and sparked a diplomatic crisis, with African governments and diplomats speaking out against the incidents in Guangzhou. The Nigerian legislator Oloye Akin Alabi posted a video of his confronting the PRC's ambassador Zhou Pingjian over the alleged mistreatment of Nigerians in the city. The governments of Ghana, Kenya, and Uganda have also asked for explanations from the PRC government, and the African Union Commission invited the PRC ambassador to the African Union to discuss the mistreatment allegations. The African ambassadors summarized the complaints in an official protest letter demanding the cessation of reported ejection from hotels or apartments, forced testing and quarantine, the seizure of passports, and threats of visa revocation, arrest or deportation of Africans particularly in the Guangdong province.

In response, authorities in Guangdong encouraged foreigners to report instances of discrimination to a 24-hour support hotline and told businesses and rental houses to treat Chinese and foreigners equally. The COVID-19 targeting of Africans had eased by June 2020.

Reports have highlighted the generalized view in China of Africans as "primitive," with racist attitudes specifically on Chinese social media going untouched by censors. On Chinese social media, Africans are often framed as a demographic threat. Interracial relationships between Chinese women and African men are especially vilified online. Observers have noted the apparent contradiction between the government's foreign policy toward Africa and its tolerance of racial hostility toward Africans on Chinese social media in an otherwise highly censored environment.

== Criticism ==
There are a variety of critical perspectives scrutinizing the balance of power relationship between China and Africa, and China's role concerning human rights in Africa. Increasingly, concerns have been raised by Africans and Western observers that China's relationship with Africa is neocolonialist in nature. As a response to such criticism, China issued the Nine Principles to Encourage and Standardise Enterprises' Overseas Investment, a charter and conduct guide for Chinese companies operating abroad.

=== Environmental degradation ===
Chinese mining and infrastructure projects have been criticized for contributing to destructive levels of pollution and wildlife loss in Africa. Chinese demand for rosewood has incentivized illegal logging and demand for donkey hides for traditional Chinese medicine has been blamed for fueling illegal slaughter of donkeys across the continent, adversely affecting women in rural African communities and contributing to poverty.

=== Illegal fishing in Africa ===
In Africa, the Chinese commercial fishing fleet is responsible for more illegal, unreported and unregulated fishing (IUU) fishing than that of any other nation.

=== Kenya ===
Kenya's relations with China figured prominently in the 2022 Kenyan general election, in which both candidates criticized the country's existing relations with China.

=== Zimbabwe ===
The China-Zimbabwe relationship drew the attention of critics. China was accused of supplying Zimbabwe with jet fighters, vehicles, and other military equipment. China declared in 2007 that it was limiting assistance to humanitarian aid. In July 2008, Chinese diplomatic channels asked Mugabe "to behave", though critics see that as a way for China to protect its interests in this country should a regime change.

=== War in Darfur ===
Another high-profile event of concern for critics of China in Africa was in the run-up to the 2008 Summer Olympics. Human rights groups criticized China for its supportive relationship with the government of Sudan, which had been accused of mass killings in Darfur. China is Sudan's largest economic partner, with a 40% share in its oil, and also sells Sudan small arms. China has threatened to veto UN Security Council actions to combat the war in Darfur. In response, a 2008 editorial in the CCP-owned daily tabloid Global Times stated that "As the Darfur issue is not an internal affair of China, nor was it caused by China, to link the two together is utterly unreasonable, irresponsible and unfair."

Following pressure and criticism from the international community, China appointed a Special Envoy for Africa Issues, Liu Guijin. To facilitate resolution of the Darfur issue, Liu coordinated with the AU, EU, United States, and UN.

== African students in China ==
China has received African students since 1958 as part of its Mao era foreign policy of Afro-Asian solidarity. These educational exchanges emphasized principle of anti-imperialism. In the 1960s and 1970s, African students reported of difficulties living in China, some of which were caused by racial discrimination. Incidents of racism against African students in China later resurfaced, notably in the 1980s in the form of campus protests.

As of 2016, most African students in China were from Anglophone countries. In 2018, the Chinese government announced at the triennial Forum on China-Africa Cooperation that China would increase its scholarship offerings to African students from 30,000 in 2015 to 50,000. According to the Ministry of Education of the People's Republic of China, 81,562 African students studied in China in 2018, a 770% increase compared to 1996. China is now the second largest African student-hosting country behind France. As of 2024, China hosts approximately 80,000 African students per year.

In 2020, according to UNESCO's Global Annual Education Report, China offered 12,000 university scholarships to African students for the next academic year, to support their studies at Chinese universities.

== Public perception ==
In 2013, BB World Public Opinion polls (PIPA) showed positive views towards China in Nigeria (78%), Ghana (68%), however noted a decline in positive views in Kenya to 58%. But 2014 survey later showed an increase in positive public opinion in Kenya (65%), as well as 67% positive opinions in Ghana and an increase to 85% in Nigeria.

A 2015 Pew Global Attitudes survey found majority positive views of China, ranging from 52% to 80% favorable, in Ghana, Ethiopia, Burkina Faso, Tanzania, Senegal, Nigeria, Kenya, Uganda, and South Africa.

Younger Africans report particularly positive views of China. In 2022, Bloomberg reported that the past two decades of China's investments into African infrastructure and its supplying of the continent with affordable consumer goods, has made young Africans feel more positive towards China. A survey conducted by the Ichikowitz Family Foundation in June 2022 and which involves lengthy face-to-face interviews, shown that 76% of 4,507 young Africans across 15 African countries had named China as a foreign power with having the biggest positive influence on their lives, surpassing the US and Europe. The positive views toward China was strongest in Rwanda, Malawi and Nigeria. However, 56 percent of those surveyed also believed in an unsubstantiated theory that COVID-19 was created and intentionally spread by China.

According to academic Rhys Jenkins, public opinion polls in Africa show that a majority of respondents in Africa view China favorably due to the positive impacts of Chinese investment and infrastructure-building.

According to a 2022 survey funded by the European Regional Development Fund and run by Palacky University Olomouc in collaboration with the Central European Institute of Asian Studies, a slightly larger share of Chinese respondents viewed Africans positively rather than negatively and most respondents favoured friendly rather than tough government policies towards Africa.

According to a 2026 poll by the Ichikowitz Family Foundation, around 95% of African respondents aged 18 to 24 consider China's influence on Africa as positive, while 95% saw China as an ally.

== China's foreign relations with African countries ==
Relations between China and Africa

- Algeria–China relations
- Angola–China relations
- Benin–China relations
- Botswana–China relations
- Burkina Faso–China relations
- Burundi–China relations
- Cameroon–China relations
- Cape Verde–China relations
- Central African Republic–China relations
- Chad–China relations
- China–Comoros relations
- China–Democratic Republic of the Congo relations
- China–Republic of the Congo relations
- China–Djibouti relations
- China–Egypt relations
- China–Equatorial Guinea relations
- China–Eritrea relations
- China–Eswatini relations
- China–Ethiopia relations
- China–Gabon relations
- (The Gambia) China–Gambia relations
- China–Ghana relations
- China–Guinea relations
- China–Guinea-Bissau relations
- China–Ivory Coast relations
- China–Kenya relations
- China–Lesotho relations
- China–Liberia relations
- China–Libya relations
- China–Madagascar relations
- China–Malawi relations
- China–Mali relations
- China–Mauritania relations
- China–Mauritius relations
- China–Morocco relations
- China–Mozambique relations
- China–Namibia relations
- China–Niger relations
- China–Nigeria relations
- China–Rwanda relations
- China–São Tomé and Príncipe relations
- China–Senegal relations
- China–Seychelles relations
- China–Sierra Leone relations
- China–Somalia relations
- China–South Africa relations
- China–South Sudan relations
- China–Sudan relations
- China–Tanzania relations
- China–Togo relations
- China–Tunisia relations
- China–Uganda relations
- China–Zambia relations
- China–Zimbabwe relations

== See also ==
- List of diplomatic missions of China
- List of projects of the Belt and Road Initiative
- China-Africa Economic and Trade Expo
- Economy of Africa
- Group of 77
- New Development Bank
- African Chinese
- Sino-Third World relations
- China-Caribbean relations
- Sino-Latin America relations
- Sino-Pacific relations
