= Chinese Friendship Farms in Africa =

Chinese Friendship Farms are part of the agricultural cooperation of the People's Republic of China with many African states. Some of the numerous projects started as development aid, other (and later) engagements lost this aspect.

== Background ==
In sub-Saharan Africa, agriculture in many countries struggles to adapt to the variability of natural conditions, limiting planting to the rainy season and making cultivation nearly impossible during the dry season. The prevalence of monoculture also hampers farmers' ability to increase their income, regardless of whether the harvest is good or bad. Additionally, the utilization rate of arable land remains low in some regions. For instance, the ambassador of the Democratic Republic of Congo (DRC) to China proposed in 2018 that China assist in developing local arable land under the Belt and Road Initiative. Before this, the agricultural utilization rate in the DRC was less than 10%. Recognizing these challenges, Chinese state-owned enterprises decided to leverage their agricultural expertise to introduce more diverse cropping patterns and crop varieties in the region. Many of these efforts are part of China's broader aid to Africa, with the land typically leased from local governments. To attract foreign agricultural investment, countries like Zambia and Mozambique have implemented relevant investment regulations and offered tax incentives.

== Achievements ==
China has established several "Friendship Farms" in countries such as Zambia and Mozambique. In Zambia, China Agricultural Reclamation Group and Jiangsu Agricultural Reclamation Group invested in a friendship farm in 1994, covering 6,850,000 square meters, of which 4,100,000 square meters are cultivable. The farm sows 3.8 million square meters during the rainy season and reduces the sown area to 3.06 million square meters during the dry season, utilizing sprinkler irrigation to grow maize and wheat. As a result, the farm produced over 1,000 tons of crops annually during the 1990s. Similar farms were established by Jiangsu Nongken Group and China Nongken Group in Zambia later in the 20th century.

In Mozambique, a Friendship Farm was developed through a collaboration between a Chinese enterprise from Hubei province and the local Zaga provincial government. The Hubei Provincial Bureau of Reclamation undertook construction and field surveys, with the farm officially beginning operations in April 2007. Since then, over 3,000 local technicians have been trained. These farms also cultivate cash crops. The farm established by China National Reclamation Group (CNRG) in Tanzania in 1999 primarily focuses on sisal, while the Friendship Farm in Zimbabwe, built by Zhangji Farm from Hubei Province, focuses on tobacco. These projects often benefit neighboring local farmers as well, with high-quality agricultural products being purchased by entities such as China National Reclamation Group. Since 2008, China Agricultural Development Group has established seven Friendship Farms in countries like Guinea, Gabon, and Ghana, growing crops such as wheat, surplus rice, soybeans, gaoliang, sisal, and sudangrass by 2019. However, the lack of local infrastructure for warehousing, logistics, and processing often requires Chinese assistance, underscoring the public welfare aspect of these projects. The unstable business environment in countries like Central Africa, Zimbabwe, and Madagascar has also affected related industries, with some projects even forced to halt completely.

Originally this farm was set up in the context of China–Africa Friendship Cooperation. There was not so much economic interest involved … [yet] although Lianfeng was established for a specific state purpose, we are still an enterprise.’

— A Chinese farm team-leader accd. to Brautigam, 2012

Official Chinese government information from 2006 claims that through agricultural cooperation between China and Africa 40 countries could establish "agro technology pilot or demonstration farms and promotion stations under nearly 200 cooperation programs and carried out 23 fishery cooperation projects with 13 African countries." Exchange of technical staff is also an important part of the cooperation (more than 10 000 Chinese specialists sent to Africa). Academic findings from 2009, claim that 14 such agro-technical demonstration stations had been started by China.

The employment mix between Chinese and local African workers varies between projects, yet many projects have a significant positive employment effect in their regions.

Chinese agricultural investment has to be analysed in the global context. It has received (mostly unfairly) exceptional international media coverage.

== Staffing Structure ==
Each Friendship Farm typically operates with a small management team. For example, the farm located on the outskirts of Lusaka, Zambia's capital, has only five managers, with the rest of the staff comprising Chinese technicians and locally employed farmers. In contrast, China National Reclamation Group's sisal farm in Tanzania employs a six-person senior management team and a middle management team, with most of the remaining hundreds of long-term and short-term workers being local farmers.

== Examples ==
The list of projects is long, yet here are a few illustrative examples

- Wanbao Rice Farm, Mozambique, rice
- China-Zambia Friendship Farm, 630 ha, renewable 99 years lease
- Hanhe Farm, Uganda, mushrooms and others, 160 ha
- Hubei-Gaza Friendship Farm, Rwanda, rice,
- Anié Sugar Complex, Togo, sugar cane, 1 300 ha

A comprehensive list of investments can be found in the book 'Will Africa feed China?'

== See also ==
- Large-scale Agricultural Investments
- China-Africa relations
- Development Cooperation
