= China Africa Research Initiative =

Johns Hopkins University research institute

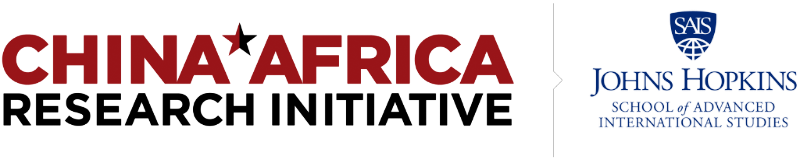
- The CARI logo
- Abbreviation: CARI
- Formation: 2014; 12 years ago
- Headquarters: 1717 Massachusetts Ave NW, Suite 723
- Location: Washington, D.C.
- Director: Deborah Bräutigam
- Website: www.sais-cari.org

The China Africa Research Initiative (CARI) at the Johns Hopkins University School of Advanced International Studies (SAIS) is a research program dedicated to understanding the political and economic aspects of China-Africa relations. Launched in 2014, it is based at the Paul H. Nitze School of Advanced International Studies in Washington, D.C.

SAIS-CARI is focused on producing and promoting analysis of the relationship between China and African countries. It also specializes in conducting evidence-based analysis, fostering collaboration, and training future leaders to understand the economic and political dimensions of China-Africa relations and their implications for human security and global development.

The initiative is directed by Dr. Deborah Bräutigam, SAIS Professor of Comparative Politics and director of the International Development Program (IDEV). She is the author of Will Africa Feed China? (2015), The Dragon's Gift: The Real Story of China in Africa (2009), and the blog "China in Africa: The Real Story." Both of Bräutigam's books use extensive fieldwork and on-the-ground evidence to challenge conventional wisdom on China's relationship with African countries.

== Research ==
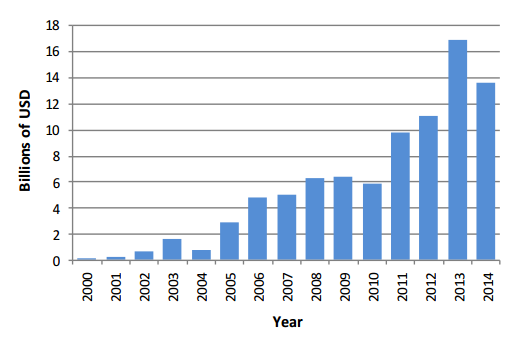
China's annual committed finance to African countries, 2000-2014

== Annual conferences ==
- 2021 – "China’s Overseas Lending in Comparative Perspective," Apr 6–May 18, 2021 (virtual)
  - Keynotes were Kristen Hopewell (University of British Columbia), on “Clash of Powers: US-China Rivalry in Global Trade Governance”, and Stephen Kaplan (George Washington University), on “Globalizing Patient Capital: The Political Economy of Chinese Finance in the Americas”
- 2020 – "Strategic Interests, Security Implications: China, Africa, and the Rest," Sep 22–Oct 2, 2020 (virtual)
  - The 2020 keynote speaker was Prof. Chris Alden, on China's Changing Role in African Security.
- 2019 – "Catalysts, Competition and Learning: Knowledge, Skills, and Technology Transfer in China-Africa Engagements", April 15–16, 2019
  - Presenters discussed aspects including knowledge transfer in entrepreneurship, special economic zones, the manufacturing sector, FDI, and infrastructure.
- 2018 – “Matters of State: Politics, Governance, and Agency in China-Africa Engagement”, April 19–20, 2018
  - Panels discussed the relationship between China, Africa, and the West, African agency and strategic bargaining, leadership, civil society, and state capacity.
- 2016 – "Orient Express: Chinese Infrastructure Engagement in Africa", October 13–14, 2016
- 2015 – "Researching China’s Overseas Finance and Aid: What, Why, How, Where and How Much?", April 10, 2015
- 2014 – "China’s Agricultural Investment in Africa: 'Land Grabs' or 'Friendship Farms'?", May 16, 2014

== SAIS-CARI in the media (selected) ==
SAIS-CARI research has been featured in NPR, Financial Times, The New York Times, The Wall Street Journal, The Economist, Bloomberg, The Washington Post, and more.

== Publications (selected) ==
SAIS-CARI publishes policy briefs, working papers, briefing papers, and economic bulletins on a range of topics concerning the growing relationship between China and Africa. The publications can be found on CARI's website.

== Funding ==
SAIS-CARI currently receives support from Carnegie Corporation of New York to develop a database to track Chinese finance and investments in Africa; construct and maintain the CARI website; publish newsletters, working papers, and policy briefs; host conferences, roundtables, and workshops; and fund the CARI fellowship program for scholars, journalists, researchers and practitioners.

In the past, SAIS-CARI has also received support through a grant from the UK's Department for International Development and the Economic and Social Research Council (DFID/ESRC) for a project on "evidence-based analysis of technology transfer, linkages, learning, and spillovers associated with Chinese investment in African manufacturing, agribusiness, and construction industries."

== See also ==
- Forum on China–Africa Cooperation
- Africa–China relations
- Africa–China economic relations
