= Burundi–China relations =

Bilateral relations

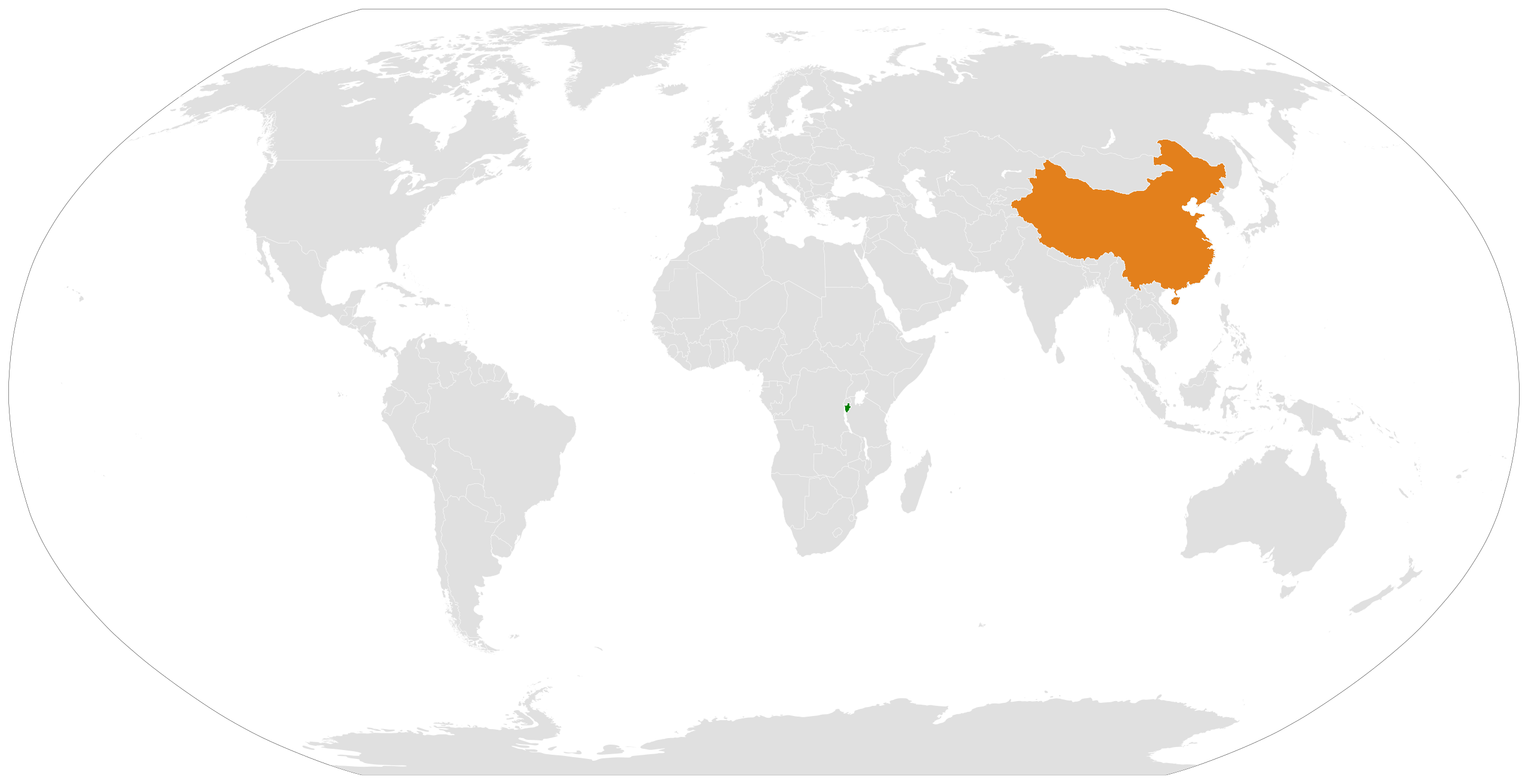

- Burundi: China

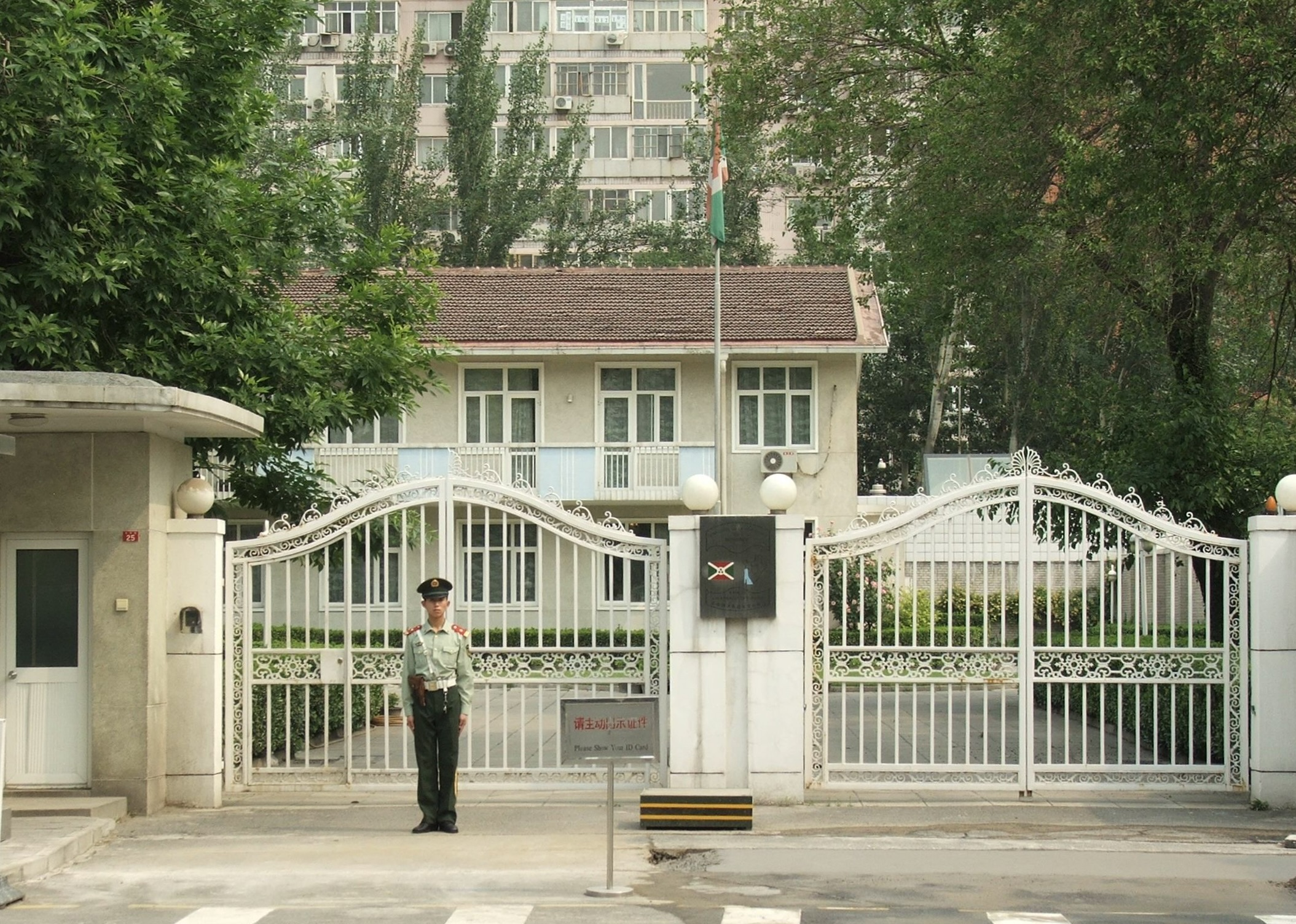
Embassy of Burundi in China

Burundi–China relations refer to the diplomatic, economic, and cultural ties between the Republic of Burundi and the People's Republic of China (PRC). The two countries established formal diplomatic ties in 1963 and, barring a six-year suspension of ties between 1965 and 1971, have maintained a wide of range of bilateral relations since. Over the years, this relationship has deepened, with China seeking to assert a growing role in the central African country's economic development and displace the European Union as its main financial, economic, and diplomatic partner.

== Background ==
Diplomatic relations between Burundi and China were established on December 21, 1963, under CCP Chairman Mao Zedong and King Mwambutsa IV Bangiriceng, respectively. King Mwambutsa broke off diplomatic relations with China in 1965, due to shifting political alliances. Relations were restored under Michel Micombero the first President of Burundi, on October 31, 1971, coinciding with Burundi's support for China's recognition in the United Nations through Resolution 2758.

During the Cold War, China expanded its engagement with African nations, including Burundi, as part of its broader strategy to gain diplomatic allies and counter Western and Soviet influence in Africa. This period saw increased economic aid and technical assistance from China to Burundi. In return, Burundi aligned with China on international issues. Preceding Resolution 2578, Chinese supported the Bujumbura Textile complex (COTEBU), built following a 1972 agreement granting Burundi an interest-free credit to acquire equipment and goods. It marking one of many major industrial projects between the two nations.

In the 21st century, China had viewed Burundi through the lens of its campaign to expand geopolitical influence in Africa through key infrastructure and trade projects such as the Belt and Road Initiative and the Forum on China-Africa Cooperation (FOCAC), at the expense of Europe and the United States, and secure access to natural resources that Beijing deems as vital to its economy. Burundi joined the Belt and Road Initiative (BRI) in 2018.

== Political relations ==
China and Burundi maintain diplomatic relations that are characterized by observers as productive and based on various mutual interests, while their foreign policy stances often align on international issues. Burundi recognizes the PRC as the sole government of mainland China and Taiwan, within the framework one China principle. In this context, Burundi supports efforts by the PRC to "achieve national reunification," and moreover considers the issues of Hong Kong, Xinjiang and Tibet to be solely Chinese internal affairs. In return, China has backed Burundi in international forums, advocating principled non-interference in internal affairs, consistent with China's broader African diplomacy. In June 2020, Burundi was one of 53 countries, backed Beijing's Hong Kong national security law at the United Nations.

In 2023, Burundian President Évariste Ndayishimiye met with CCP General Secretary Xi Jinping in Chengdu, where both leaders reaffirmed their commitment to deeper economic and political collaboration. The meeting emphasized Burundi's continued support for China's global initiatives and China's role in Burundi's infrastructure and development projects. In September 2024, Ndayishimiye visited China to attend that year's FOFAC Summit in Beijing, following which he traveled to Foshan, Guangdong to view clean energy facilities and examine applicability to serve Burundi's energy needs.

== Economic relations ==
=== Infrastructure ===
Since the construction of COTEBU, China has continued investment in various Burundian infrastructure and development projects. China has constructed roads, bridges, and assisted building the Prince Louis Rwagasore Clinical Hospital in Bujumbura, and continues to support it through medical training programs. In 2019, China gifted a new $22 million presidential palace to the Burundi government. In February 2022, the countries signed an agreement to expand and upgrade Burundi's lone airport, Melchior Ndadaye International Airport. In January 2025 Burundi co-signed a deal alongside Tanzania with two Chinese firms to build a 282 km-long railway to transport metals from Burundi to Tanzania's Dar es Salaam port. The railway's Burundi section is 84 km in length, linking Musongati to Malagarasi.

=== Trade relations ===
Trade between Burundi and China has grown over the decades since diplomatic relations were established. Burundi's primary exports are agricultural products such as coffee and tea, while its main imports are Chinese-manufactured goods, including machinery, textiles, and electronics. However, the trade balance has been skewed in China's favor, with Burundi importing significantly more than it exports from Beijing.

In the early 2000s, Chinese annual exports to Burundi were valued at $2.718 million, while Burundi's exports to China stood at $491,000. More recently, according to Observatory Economic Complexity's 2022 data, that trade deficit has only widened. Burundi's exports to China were valued at approximately $9.25 million, $8.53 million solely from exporting tea. Whereas China's exports to Burundi stood at $104 million, highlighting a significant trade deficit. China remains one of Burundi's largest trade partners, with key imports including construction materials, refined petroleum, and pharmaceutical products.

=== Educational and cultural exchange ===
China has offered scholarships and vocational training programs for Burundian students, seeking to strengthen ties through "soft power." Burundian students have studied in China under government-sponsored programs, with the intent of fostering long-term diplomatic and professional relationships between the two nations. According to Chinese media, in 2024 more than 50 Burundians relocated to China for further higher education, and over 300 travelled to China for seminars and other education visits.

In 2012, China founded a Confucius Institute at the University of Burundi to teach Chinese to local students. According to Chinese Ambassador to Burundi Zhao Jiangping, more than 30,000 students learned Chinese at the Institute in its first decade of operation. Since 2018, China's embassy in Burundi has offered scholarships to local master's degree students. In May 2025 Chinese government donated $1.5 million via its national development agency China International Development Cooperation Agency (CIDCA) to the United Nations World Food Programme (WFP) to provide meals for thousands of Burundian students.
