= China–Eritrea relations =

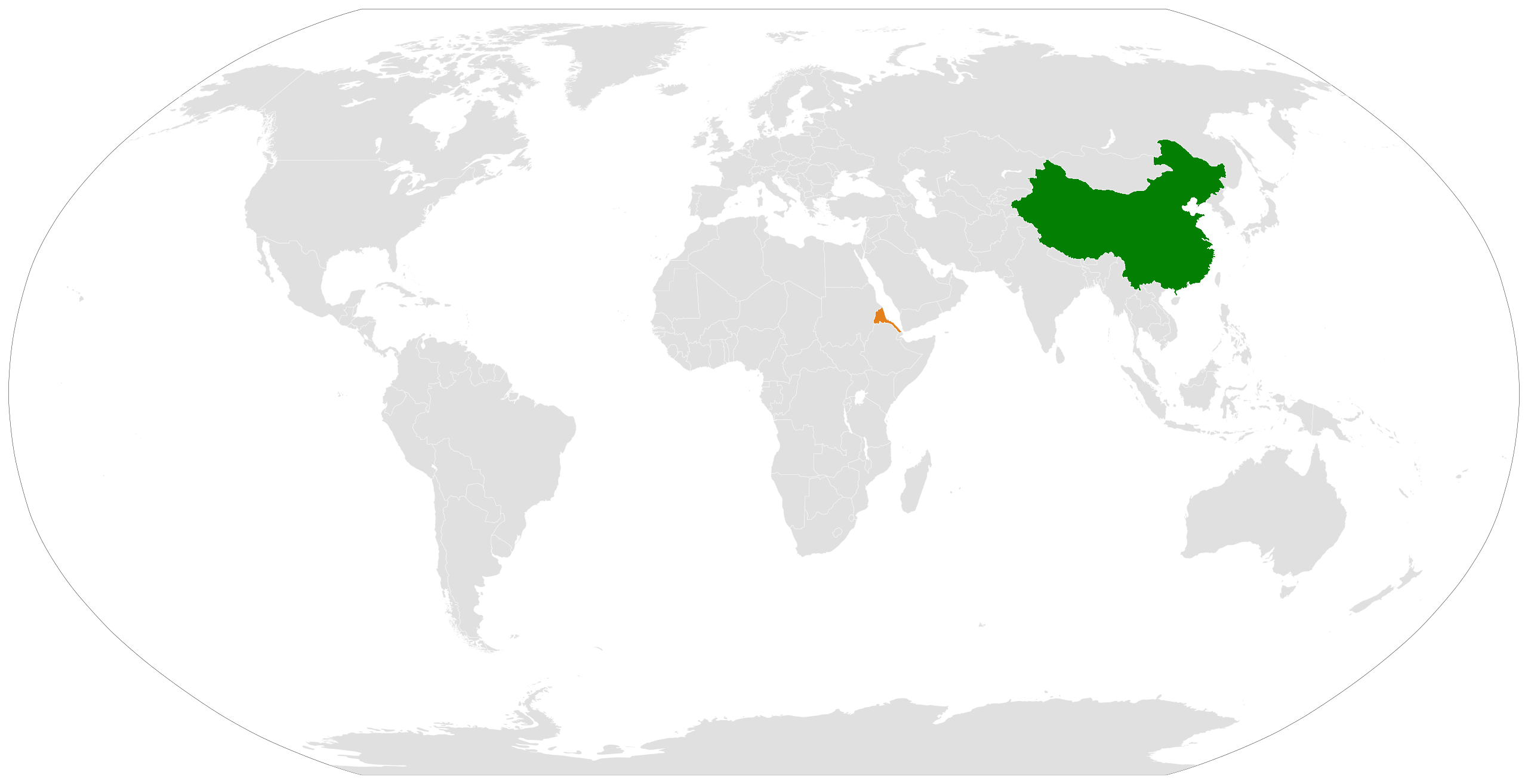

- Eritrea: China

Diplomatic mission
- Eritrean Embassy, Beijing: Chinese Embassy, Asmara

China–Eritrea relations refers to the current and historical relationship between China and Eritrea. Eritrea gained independence from Ethiopia in 1993 and, as of 2007, relations between the two states registered "smooth growth".

== Prior to independence ==
China supported the Eritrean independence movement through the Eritrean Liberation Front and later the Eritrean People's Liberation Front. Beginning in 1967, today's Eritrean President Isaias Afewerki received military training in China.

== Diplomatic relations ==
The People's Republic of China of Eritrea established diplomatic relations on May 24, 1993.

Eritrea follows the one China principle. It recognizes the People's Republic of China as the sole government of China and Taiwan as an integral part of China's territory, and supports all efforts by the PRC to "achieve national reunification". It also considers Hong Kong, Xinjiang and Tibet to be China's internal affairs.

In June 2020, Eritrea was one of 53 countries who backed the Hong Kong national security law at the United Nations.

Eritrea joined the Belt and Road Initiative (BRI) in 2021.

== Economic relations ==
Eritrea borrowed $3 million in 1994 to buy Chinese agricultural machinery. In 2001, China canceled Eritrea's debt by granting Eritrea a grant for the same amount. China has financed a number of development projects, including a 200-bed hospital in the Eritrean capital of Asmara. In April 2006, China granted Eritrea a loan of $23 million to improve communication infrastructure. In January 2007, China and Eritrea signed economic deals, which included the removal of tariffs on Eritrean products imported to China, the partial cancellation of Eritrea's debt to China and an extension of Chinese technical assistance to Eritrea, particularly in the health sector.

== Visits ==
In 2001, Chinese vice-minister for foreign trade and economic cooperation, Zhou Keren, visited Eritrea on a 3-day visit. In early 2007, Chinese foreign minister Li Zhaoxing visited the country as part of a tour of Africa.

Chinese foreign minister Wang Yi traveled to Asmara on January 4-5, 2022. The Chinese FM met with Eritrean foreign minister and President of Eritrea at the State House in Asmara. Eritrea in 2021 signed an agreement on the BRI. Both countries in 2022 agree to a massive economic development deal, the first in Eritrea. Eritrean President visited China on an official state visit in spring of 2023. Eritrean & Chinese leaders held talks. Eritrean President visited corporate infrastructure companies and investment firms.

== See also ==
- Sino-African relations
