= China–Lesotho relations =

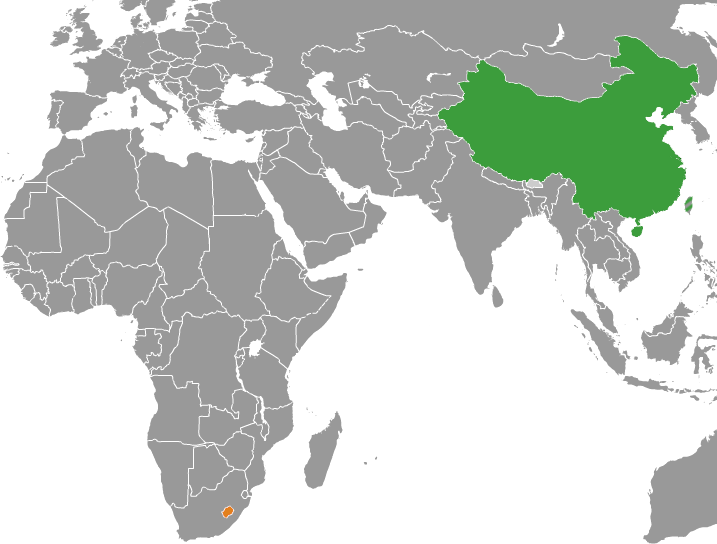
- China: Lesotho

Diplomatic mission
- Embassy of China, Masuru.: Embassy of Lesotho, Beijing

The People's Republic of China and Lesotho maintain historical, political, economic, trade, aid, healthcare and migration connections.

Modern relations include imports and exports, the Belt and Road Initiative and financial assistance through the COVID-19 pandemic. The cultural connection with migration also plays a role in their current relations.

== Historical relations ==
The China-Lesotho Cooperation is a prominent bilateral relationship, dating back to the rule of Prime Minister Leabua Jonathan. The People's Republic of China (PRC) was involved in funding the Basutoland Congress Party (BCP) from 1964. In 1983, Prime Minister Jonathan visited the PRC, resulting in Lesotho recognising Beijing. This led to economic and technical cooperation along with cultural exchange agreements between Lesotho and China. Lesotho maintained ties with Beijing, excluding the 1990 – 1994 period when Lesotho aligned with Taiwan.

Trade is the original connection between Lesotho and China which began from 1778. Exports from Lesotho range from elephant tusks, believed to be superior in Chinese culture in comparison to Asian Ivory, to medicinal and perfumery exports including oil of storax. Imports from China to Lesotho include fine art objects, gold, silver and copper.

The Chinese population in South Africa grew during the republican era (1912 – 1949) by 1,040 from 1911 to 1936 and a further 1,400 from 1936 to 1946. This resulted from the connection with consulate-general Liu Ngai, who the British government recognised as the consulate-general for Lesotho.

== Political relations ==
Lesotho and the People's Republic of China established diplomatic relations on April 30, 1983. When Lesotho recognized the Republic of China (Taiwan) in April 1990, the PRC suspended relations. Relations between Lesotho and the PRC resumed in January 1994.

The 2008 Tibetan unrest joined Lesotho and China together as China sought after diplomatic support. Lesotho was among several African countries that delivered said support.

Lesotho follows the one China principle. It recognizes the People's Republic of China as the sole government of China and Taiwan as an integral part of China's territory, and supports all efforts by the PRC to "achieve national reunification". It also considers Hong Kong, Xinjiang and Tibet to be China's internal affairs.

In June 2020, Lesotho was one of 53 countries that backed the Hong Kong national security law at the United Nations.

== Economic relations ==
In an attempt to boost social development and economic growth, China has diplomatic and international cooperation's with Lesotho on both a bilateral and multilateral scale. Examples include China-Lesotho Cooperation, Forum on China Africa Cooperation, and the African Union's Agenda 2063. These platforms occur via the Belt and Road Initiative (BRI).

Lesotho joined the BRI in 2019. The BRI connects China, Central Asia, and Europe, aiming to “encourage connectivity, economic flow, job opportunities, investment and consumption, cultural exchanges and the spirit of regional cooperation between Asia, Europe and Africa by jointly building trade routes”. This initiative influences development on a global scale by fostering closer ties between countries. Through this, the Chinese-Lesotho relations can use both international and domestic markets to facilitate cultural exchange and integration, trust between the two countries and ultimately boosting capital inflows.

An example of this is the HaMpiti to Sehlabathebe 91 km Road Project, costing US$128 million, it has the potential to generate over 300 employment opportunities through local procurement and contracting.

Further examples of beneficial projects to both China and Lesotho include; The Radio and Television Network Expansion Project, Technical Cooperation Project of Land use and Physical Planning, the New Lesotho State Library Project and the Chinese Enterprise and Textile Investment in Lesotho.

Lesotho is considered a mountainous region that seems to be fertile ground for Chinese trade and investments. Further, the cooperative ventures attracted to the region, boost the economy. Prior to the Chinese era of investment in Lesotho, remittance from Basotho was the core source of income for many in Lesotho. This came from the mining industry. The instability of employment in Lesotho has seen many households struggle. The Chinese investment, in particular the focus in the clothing textile industries, has become essential for the Basotho people.

From 2000 to 2012, there are approximately 33 Chinese official development finance projects identified in Lesotho through various media reports. These projects range from an MOU between ZTE and Lesotho government for the provision of industrial communication devices, training, and a stake in Telecom Lesotho in 2006, to funding the construction of a new parliament building in Maseru in 2007.

== Trade relations ==
Lesotho is in a trade deficit with China. Between 2002 and 2009 China restricted imports to fewer than two million compared to the 51 million Lesotho imported. In 2004 “Chinese export of clothing and textile products from Lesotho to the world stood at US$ 494,155,000”. This increasing import level into Lesotho from China is positive for local low-income consumers as it reduces cost and increases variability of goods and services. For the economy, this is a detriment.

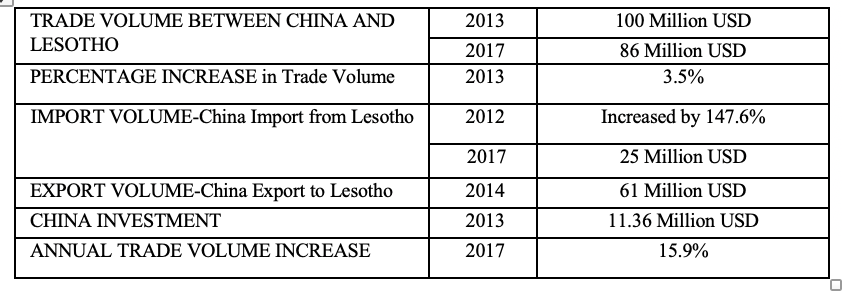
Figure 1: Chinese-Lesotho Trade Factors Trends

The Chinese have invested in Lesotho in small, medium and heavy industries, with a heavy focus on small retail and wholesale shops. Lesotho is home to one of the largest textile and clothing industries in Sub-Saharan Africa, primarily owned by the Chinese, holding 35 of 41 industries, and employing over 40,000 Basotho. Recently, the growth in export-oriented manufacturing, led by the clothing and textile sub-sector, has contributed greatly to development in Lesotho. This sector provides annual earnings of 500 million Maloti and minimum wages sit at 770 Maloti. The involvement from the Chinese facilitated great employment opportunities, with a 7% increase between 1997 and 2004, and thereby economic growth, with a reversal in Lesotho's negative growth in real gross national income in 2002.

== Aid and Loans Relations ==
Chinese aid is considered as financial assistance for key investments, limited debt relief, provision of training and scholarship programmes, technical assistance, tariff exemption, and peace keeping forces. The history of aid relations between China and Lesotho is long standing, steadily increasing since 2013, and includes construction of roads, State Library, Lesotho Parliament Building and the Manthabiseng Convention Centre.

Lesotho and China “signed 14 economic and technical assistance agreements between 1983 in 2005”. China further delivered grant funding for the National Convention centre and National Library and archives building. During the prominent drought years, China facilitated food aid, interest free loans and removed the majority of Lesotho's debt in 2001.

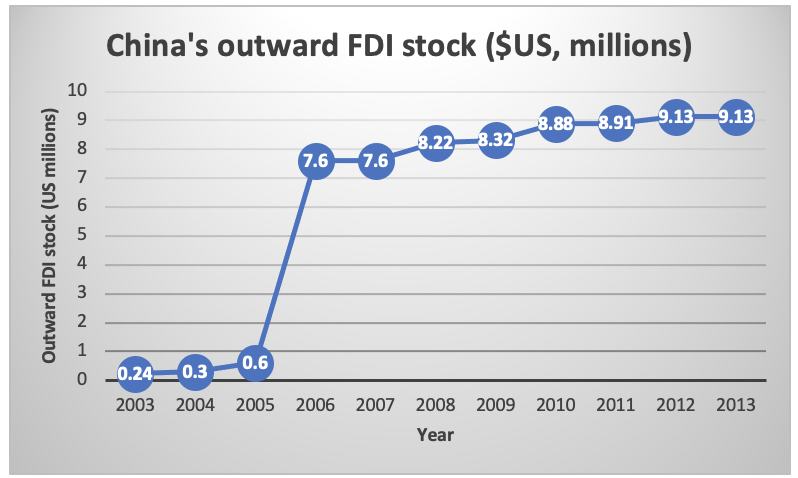
Figure 2: China's Outward FDI Stock to Lesotho

In recent years, Chinese aid has been in the form of scholarships to Basotho children to study sciences and engineering. Further, in 2002 – 2004, the Chinese government provided 2000 tons of yellow maize to the Lesotho Emergency Aid Programme. In 2005 the government delivered a grant of one million USD. Furthermore, the Chinese government has granted interest-free loans, primarily for agricultural cooperation projects “to facilitate the establishment of vegetable farms and farming related personnel training”. USAID bureaucrats aimed to coordinate this project with nationalist China in order to limit Lesotho's dependence on food imports.

Over $2,000,000 in equipment and medicine was provided in combination with annual training for specialists.

In addition to financial, trade and investment support, China has delivered aid in the form of funded workshops and seminars to Basotho in telecommunications, solar energy application technology. The trainings sat at 160 in 2005.

== Healthcare ==
In June 2020, The People's Republic of China donated 1 million Maloti to Lesotho in order to combat the hunger caused by drought and COVID-19. In August 2020, the aid assistance from China continued. Deputy Minister of Health Nto Moakhi explained the Chinese Embassy had donated medical equipment to Lesotho in an attempt to combat the COVID-19 pandemic. The equipment is supposedly “the best quality there is on the market”. China has since contributed six batches of PPE to Lesotho. In 2024, China donated 800 million Maloti to Lesotho for the construction of Maseru District Regional Hospital and Eye Clinic.

== Migration ==
Both Chinese and Basotho families are separated due to migration. Approximately 5,000 Chinese live in Lesotho and similarly to the Basotho, live in rural areas, leaving family behind. The purpose of migration for the two however varies based on economic circumstances. The Basotho use migration as a coping strategy i.e., their remittances are leant upon for food and healthcare. Conversely, the Chinese use remittances as a means to invest in education for their children.

=== Migration and the Economy ===
Among the Basotho people, there is a consensus that the Chinese migrant's impact negatively on the business sector as they threaten small-scale wholesale and retail businesses. Whilst this perception cannot be quantified, it is the view of the majority of the Basotho but cannot account for the total population. The Basotho despise the status and wage differences between the Chinese and Basotho employees, and the Chinese feel victimised through hostility.

Despite the general negative outlook, Chinese migrants have increased trade and employment opportunities by 46%. Particularly in rural regions, the Chinese have developed new shops, eliminating travel time for daily provisions and ultimately boosting employment, with 74% of shop managers and 65% of shop assistants reporting the majority of workers were Basotho.

Local law states that small retail shops (less than 1,000m^{2}) are reserved for Basotho. However, some Chinese migrants’ manoeuvre around this law through renting shops from Basotho in exchange for a fixed monthly sum.

== Criticism ==
Some critics argue the BRI, whilst seeming positive, becomes a channel for the Chinese government to “expand its global political influence and power.”

With regards to the effect of Chinese investment in Lesotho, the locals recognise the benefit of poverty alleviation, however, believe the Chinese should “concentrate on creating jobs in big factories and wholesale shops”.

== Extradition ==
China has an extradition treaty with Lesotho.

== See also ==
- Foreign relations of China
- Foreign relations of Lesotho
- Africa–China relations
