= China–Liberia relations =

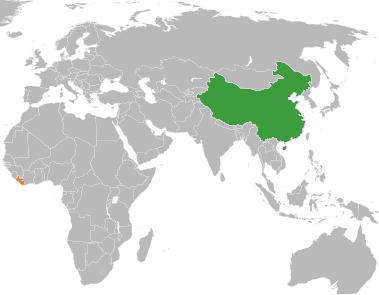

- China: Liberia

China–Liberia relations refer to the bilateral relations of the People's Republic of China and Liberia. Official relations began in 1977, but were broken on multiple occasions, only to be reformed later on. As of 2009, significant amounts of both investment and foreign aid came from China to Liberia.

== History ==
Relations between the People's Republic of China (PRC) and Liberia have been broken and reestablished several times since February 17, 1977, when diplomatic relations between the PRC and Liberia were first formed. The PRC broke off relations with Liberia on October 10, 1989, in response to Liberia's recognition of the Republic of China (Taiwan). Taiwan had offered $200 million in aid to Liberia for education and infrastructure in exchange for this recognition. The PRC reestablished relations with Liberia on August 10, 1993, and opened an embassy in Monrovia, making Liberia one of the few nations which established diplomatic ties to both the PRC and ROC. The first Liberian ambassador to China was John Daniel Cox, from 1977 to 1981.

In 1997, Charles Taylor's government proclaimed to recognize "two Chinas" and the PRC subsequently severed diplomatic relations. In addition, following the transfer of sovereignty over Hong Kong, Liberia's consulate, established during British rule, was forced to close.

Liberia dropped diplomatic relations with the ROC on October 12, 2003, and reestablished ties with the People's Republic of China. This move was seen largely as a result of the PRC's lobbying in the UN and plans to deploy a peacekeeping force in Liberia.

During the Ebola outbreak in western Africa, Liberia was one of the countries to which China's People's Liberation Army provided medical personnel.

Liberia joined the Belt and Road Initiative (BRI) in 2019.

== Economic relations ==
From 2000 to 2011, there are approximately 68 Chinese official development finance projects identified in Liberia through various media reports. These projects range from renovating and constructing the Fendell Campus for Engineering of the University of Liberia, to a US$10 million contract with the Government of Liberia for the construction of a 100 bedroom hospital in Nimba County in 2008.

== Political relations ==
Liberia follows the one China principle. It recognizes the People's Republic of China as the sole government of China and Taiwan as an integral part of China's territory, and supports all efforts by the PRC to "achieve national reunification". It also considers Hong Kong, Xinjiang and Tibet to be China's internal affairs.

== Cultural relations ==
In October 2009, the Chinese embassy in Monrovia opened language Chinese language courses for Liberians. The need for such courses was due to the growing business relations and the lack of Chinese speakers among Liberian citizens. The Liberians hoped to work for and study in China.

== See also ==
- Sino-African relations
