= China–Guinea-Bissau relations =

- China: Guinea-Bissau

China–Guinea-Bissau refers to the current and historical relationship between the People's Republic of China (PRC) and Guinea-Bissau. Relations were established in March 1974, several months before Guinea-Bissau's September 1974 independence. From 1990 to 1998, Guinea-Bissau maintained diplomatic relations with the Republic of China (Taiwan) rather than with the People's Republic. Relations were reestablished in 1998 and maintained since.

== History ==
The PRC was one of the African Party for the Independence of Guinea and Cape Verde's (PAIGC) "most enthusiastic supporters" during the twelve year (1963–1974) struggle for independence. On March 15, 1974, Guinea-Bissau established formal diplomatic relations. When the PAIGC led the country to independence in 1974, it maintained close relations with the Chinese Communist Party until the 1990 break in favor of Taiwan. The first bilateral visit occurred in July 1975, when Guinea-Bissau's first foreign minister Victor Saúde Maria visited China. Guinea-Bissauan Presidents João Bernardo Vieira (1982) and Koumba Yala (2002) visited China as well.

The PRC suspended relations after Guinea-Bissau's recognition of Taiwan in May 1990. In April 1998, Guinea-Bissau and the PRC restored relations.

During the Ebola outbreak in western Africa, Guinea-Bissau was one of the countries to which China's People's Liberation Army provided medical personnel.

Guinea-Bissau joined the Belt and Road Initiative (BRI) in 2021.

== Economic relations ==
The two countries signed a number of bilateral economic agreements from 1974 to 1990; China built a stadium, hospital and other technological facilities. After the resumption of relations in 1998, China focused on enhancing agricultural production, housing, fisheries and power generation. Since the first Forum on China Africa Cooperation in 2000, Beijing has successfully delivered $113 million in Official Development Assistance to Guinea-Bissau. Major officially financed development projects in Guinea-Bissau include:

- $48.5 million to modernize Guinea-Bissau's telephone network
- $18 million to construct a parliamentary building in 2003
- Cancellation of $5.8 million of Guinea-Bissau's debt to China in 2001

As of 2002, Guinea-Bissau imported approximately US$4.5 million of Chinese goods.

Guinea-Bissau and China both participate in the multi-lateral group Forum Macao, which China formed in 2003 to increase economic and commercial cooperation between China and the Portuguese-speaking countries.

In 2010, China announced a $1 billion fund designed to increase trade between the PRC and Portuguese speaking countries.

In 2017, China announced that it was to invest $184 million to build a biomass power plant.

== Political relations ==
Guinea Bissau follows the one China principle. It recognizes the People's Republic of China as the sole government of China and Taiwan as an integral part of China's territory, and supports all efforts by the PRC to "achieve national reunification". It also considers Hong Kong, Xinjiang and Tibet to be China's internal affairs.

In June 2020, Guinea-Bissau was one of 53 countries backed the Hong Kong national security law at the United Nations.
