= Benin–China relations =

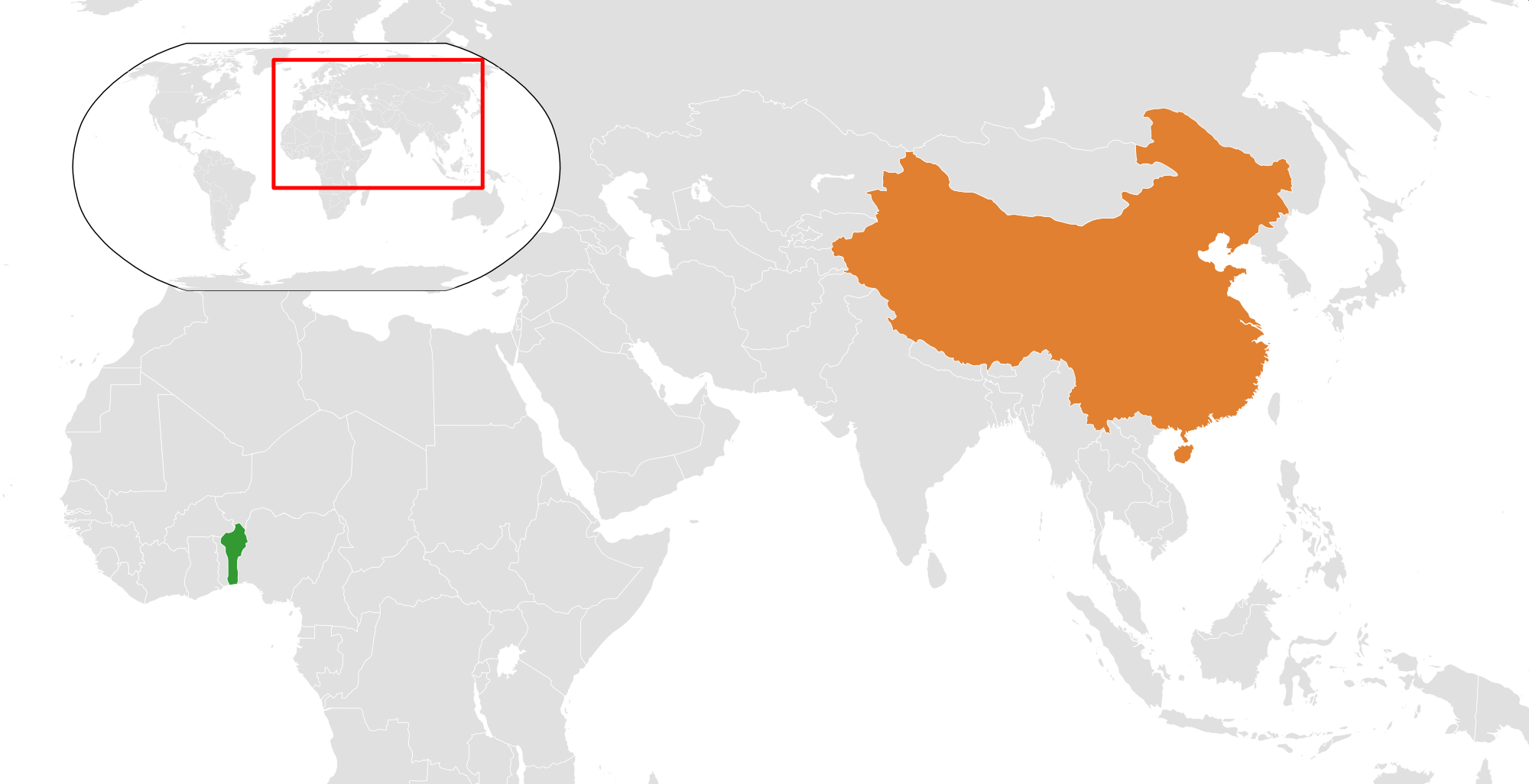
- Benin: China

Benin–China relations refers to the current and historical relationship between Benin and the People's Republic of China.

== History ==
Relations first established bilateral relations on November 12, 1964. In January 1966, Benin recognized the Republic of China (Taiwan) and withdrew relations from the People's Republic. Benin and PR China reestablished relations in December 1972 under the regime of Mathieu Kérékou in Benin. Benin and PR China regularly exchanged high level visits, with Kérékou personally visiting Beijing in 1976, 1986 and 1998. Relations have focused on commercial development. Since 1972, Benin has supported PR China's One China Policy.

== Economic relations ==
China has aided Benin in the creation of a number of public works projects, including a hospital in Lokossa and Cotonou Friendship Stadium. More recent Chinese development finance to Benin includes a 160 million yuan grant for construction of an overpass in Cotonou as well as the construction of an Economy and Trade Development Center. Zhejiang Tianshi International Economic and Technological Cooperation Co completed construction of the center in 2009 at a total cost of 50 million yuan. In the 1990s and 2000s, Benin was a major consumer of Chinese goods; for example, in 2002, the total trade value of exchanges between the two countries was approximately US$437 million; Benin exported about 17 million US dollars' worth of goods to China, while Benin imported 420 million US dollars' worth of Chinese goods.

In March 2018, President Patrice Talon approved China to develop a railway linking Cotonou with Niamey, with an estimated cost of US$4 billion.

Benin is part of the Belt and Road Initiative (BRI).

== Cultural relations ==
Following the establishment of relations, China founded a "China Cultural Center" in Cotonou. Approximately 25 Beninese students study yearly in China.

== Sovereignty ==
Benin follows the one China principle. It recognizes the People's Republic of China as the sole government of China and Taiwan as an integral part of China's territory, and supports all efforts by the PRC to "achieve national reunification". It also considers Hong Kong, Xinjiang and Tibet to be China's internal affairs.
