= Cape Verde–China relations =

- Cape Verde: China

Cape Verde–China relations refers to the current and historical relationship between the People's Republic of China and Cape Verde. The two states established bilateral relations on April 25, 1976, shortly after Cape Verde gained independence from the Portuguese Empire. Cape Verde is an adherent to PR China's One China Policy. In the mid-1990s, a number of Chinese capitalists began investing in the island nation and relations grew during the 2000s as a result.

== History ==
In 1980, Cape Verde and China signed an Economic and Technical Cooperation Agreement through which China would construct a parliamentary hall for Cape Verde. The hall was finished in 1985.

Since the first Forum on China Africa Cooperation conference in 2000, the Chinese government has successfully delivered $63.5 million in development finance. These projects include $4.4 million for construction of the Poilão dam in the Santa Cruz, $22 million to build a sports stadium in Monte Vaca, and $2.3 million in debt forgiveness.

Cape Verde and China both participate in the multi-lateral group Forum Macao, which China formed in 2003 to increase economic and commercial cooperation between China and the Portuguese-speaking countries. During the 2010 Forum Macao meeting, Chinese Premier Wen Jiaobao announced the creation of a $1 billion fund aimed at boosting trade between China and Portuguese speaking countries.

Cape Verde joined the Belt and Road Initiative (BRI) in 2018.

Cape Verde follows the one China principle. It recognizes the People's Republic of China as the sole government of China and Taiwan as an integral part of China's territory, and supports all efforts by the PRC to "achieve national reunification". It also considers Hong Kong, Xinjiang and Tibet to be China's internal affairs.

== Bibliography ==
- Cardenal, Juan Pablo; Araújo, Heriberto (2011). La silenciosa conquista china (in Spanish). Barcelona: Crítica. p. 88. ISBN 9788498922578.
