= China–Guinea relations =

- China: Guinea

China–Guinea relations refer to the bilateral relations between China and Guinea. China and Guinea established diplomatic relations on October 14, 1959.

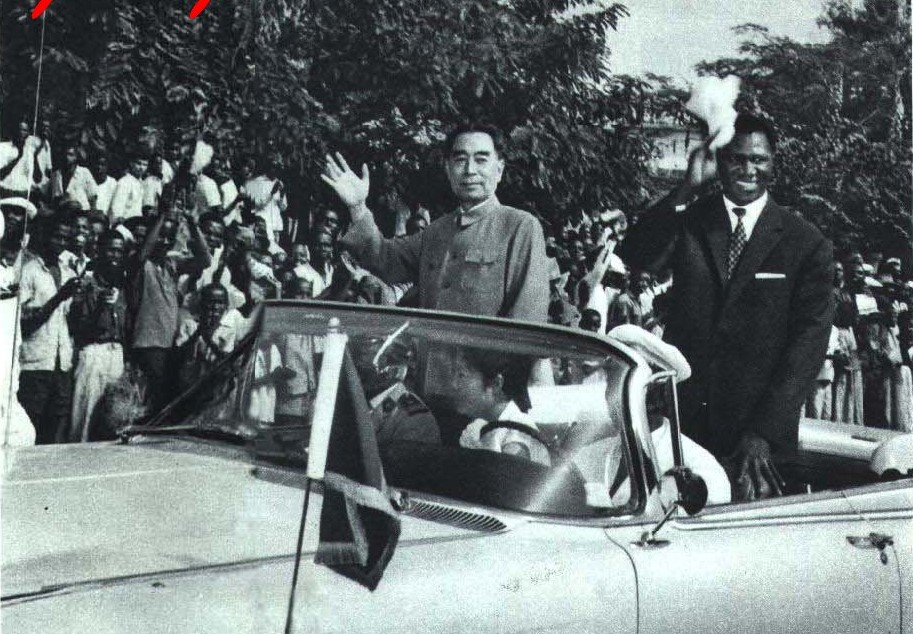
Chinese premier Zhou Enlai and Guinea's president Ahmed Sékou Touré in 1964

== Diplomatic relations ==
From Guinean independence in 1958 onwards, under the leadership of the socialist president Ahmed Sékou Touré, the country developed a good relationship with Maoist China (rather than the Republic of China). In June 2020, Guinea was one of 53 countries who backed the Hong Kong national security law at the United Nations.

During the Ebola outbreak in western Africa, Guinea was one of the countries to which China's People's Liberation Army provided medical personnel.

== Economic relations ==
Along with Ghana and Mali, two other newly independent states under leftist governments, Guinea was one of the first countries in Africa to receive Chinese aid. Throughout the 1960s, Chinese loans helped Guinea to construct an oil pressing factory, a bamboo processing center, a series of paddy fields and other significant projects. Radio-Conakry reported that two countries signed a trade agreement worth 3.4 million pounds on 6 February 1971.

From 2000 to 2011, there were approximately 31 Chinese official development finance projects identified in Guinea through various media reports. These projects range from the construction of a 150-bed hospital at Kipe in 2008, to an aid package worth US$5.2 million in 2007.

Guinea joined the Belt and Road Initiative (BRI) in 2018.

=== Bauxite ore ===
China is Guinea's chief customer for its principal export, bauxite (aluminum ore), consuming half of Guinea's production, which provides half of China's aluminum (China, in turn, provides half of the world's aluminum). In the 21st century, the relationship has been facilitated by China's ties to President Condé

== Political relations ==
Guinea follows the one China principle. It recognizes the People's Republic of China as the sole government of China and Taiwan as an integral part of China's territory, and supports all efforts by the PRC to "achieve national reunification". It also considers Hong Kong, Xinjiang and Tibet to be China's internal affairs.
