= China–Niger relations =

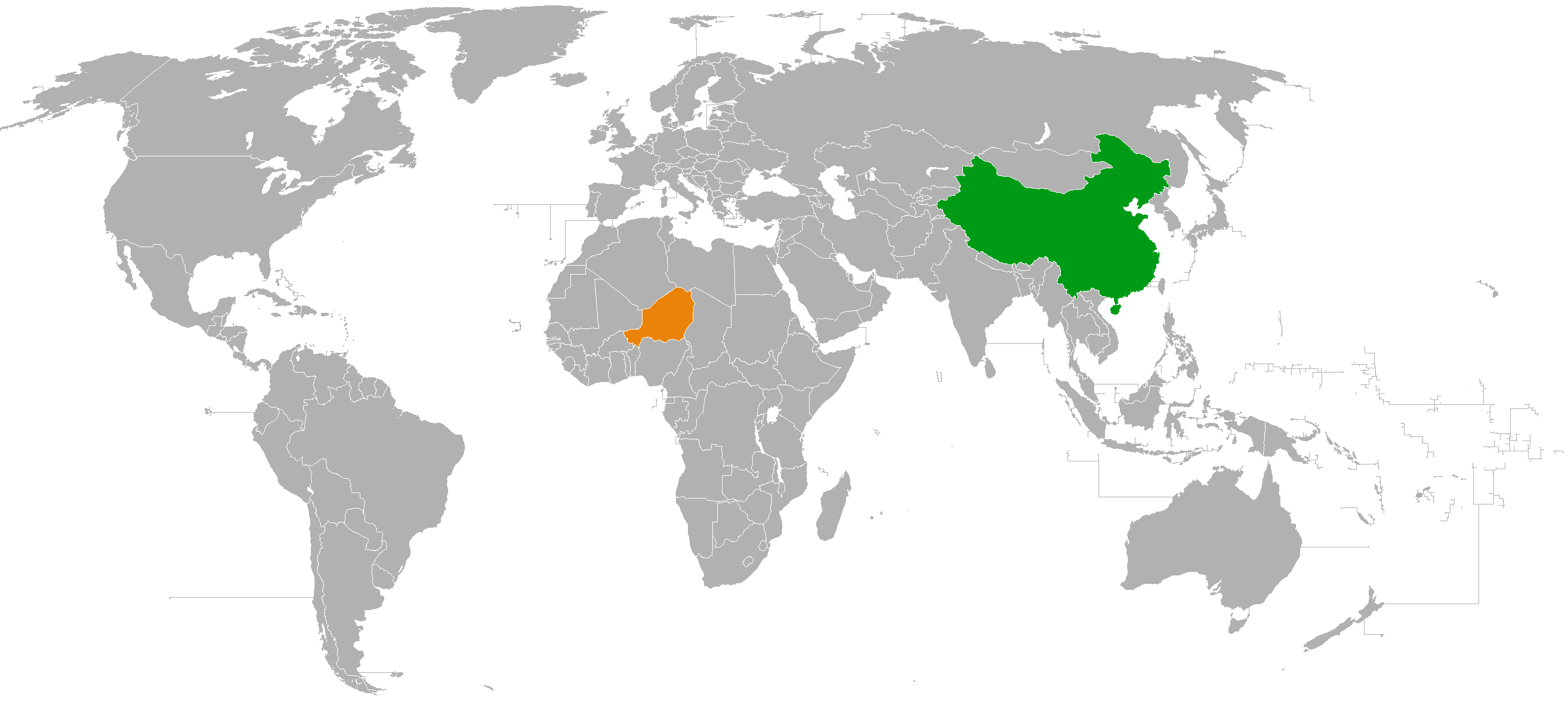
- China: Niger

The People's Republic of China (PRC) and Niger established diplomatic relations in July 1974. The PRC has an embassy in Niamey and Niger has an embassy in Beijing.

== History ==
On August 2, 1960, the government of the People's Republic of China sent a telegram to Hamani Diori, then Prime Minister of Niger, congratulating Niger on its independence. However, under Diori's leadership, Niger established diplomatic relations with the Republic of China in 1963 and opposed the People's Republic of China's seat in the United Nations when the issue of China's representation was discussed at the United Nations General Assembly.

China established diplomatic relations with Niger on July 20, 1974. In the communiqué on the establishment of diplomatic relations, Niger recognized that the People's Republic of China was the only legitimate government representing all Chinese people and that Taiwan was a territory of the People's Republic of China. After the establishment of diplomatic relations, the People's Republic of China assisted in the construction of a dam and ship lock in Niger.

On June 19, 1992, the transitional government of Niger declared the reestablishment of the "diplomatic relations" with Taiwan. On June 27, after repeated representations from China, the Prime Minister's Office of Niger issued a communiqué to revoke the decision to resume diplomatic relations with the Republic of China. On July 22, the Niger government issued another communiqué to confirm that the decision to resume diplomatic relations with the Republic of China was valid. On July 30, the People's Republic of China protested against Niger's violation of its commitments in the communiqué on the establishment of diplomatic relations and severed diplomatic relations with Niger. After the two countries severed diplomatic relations, some Chinese private enterprises continued to do business in Niger. In 1996, Ibrahim Barre Mainassara launched a military coup and came to power. He attached great importance to relations with China and China and Niger resumed diplomatic relations on August 19, 1996.

From 2000 to 2011, there are approximately 37 Chinese official development finance projects identified in Niger through various media reports. These projects range from developing a uranium mine complex in Azelik in 2006, to the construction of the Second bridge across the Niger river, and a $12 million debt relief in 2001.

Niger participates in the Belt and Road Initiative (BRI).

In June 2020, Niger was one of 53 countries that backed the Hong Kong national security law at the United Nations.

In March 2025, Niger officials ordered three Chinese officials working in the oil sector, including for China National Petroleum Corporation, to leave the country.

== Economic relations ==
According to the Commercial Counselor's Office of the Chinese Embassy in Niger, because Niger's export commodities were not diversified enough to meet the needs of the Chinese market, Niger once recorded zero exports to China, resulting in a trade surplus. Therefore, in 2004, China promised not to impose tariffs on the least developed countries in Africa, hoping to encourage Niger to export goods to China.

== Sovereignty issues ==
Niger follows the one China principle. It recognizes the People's Republic of China as the sole government of China and Taiwan as an integral part of China's territory, and supports all efforts by the PRC to "achieve national reunification". It also considers Hong Kong, Xinjiang and Tibet to be China's internal affairs.

== Cultural relations ==
In addition to economic and trade cooperation, China and Niger have also signed a cultural and educational cooperation agreement. In 2008, 223,000 Nigeriens went to China to study, more than the number of Chinese students studying abroad that year. In 2010, China Radio International officially began broadcasting French and Hausa programs in the Nigerien cities of Agadez, Maradi and Zinder.

Niger participated in the 2010 Shanghai World Expo in China. Its pavilion was located in the African Pavilion with the theme of "Controlling Urban Expansion and Promoting Urban Development". The pavilion displayed Niger's cultural relics and handicrafts, and also introduced the country's agricultural and urbanization development. Although Niger experienced a military coup in the same year, causing chaos, the person in charge of the Niger exhibition area said that the determination to participate in the World Expo would not waver.

== Assistance ==
China has provided assistance to Niger on many occasions. Since 2008, China National Petroleum Corporation has effectively built the country's oil industry by building a crude oil development base, oil pipelines and refineries in the Sahara Desert; since then, Chinese companies have assisted Niger in producing and processing oil, making Niger an oil exporter while creating jobs. In February 2015, Mohamed Bazoum, then Niger's Minister of Foreign Affairs, Cooperation and African Integration, met with Wang Yi, Minister of Foreign Affairs of the People's Republic of China. He lamented that it was China that helped Niger successfully produce oil, and Wang Yi expressed China's willingness to cooperate with African countries for development.

Since the two countries established diplomatic relations in 1974, the People's Republic of China has sent 17 medical teams to Niger (as of late October 2014). On March 31, 2015, the Chinese Embassy in Niger donated a flour mill to a local charity foundation in the hope of increasing the production capacity of Niger's poor and improving their lives. In April of the same year, the Chinese government provided Niger with more than 10,000 water pumps and spare parts in the hope of making local food production more stable.

China built two primary schools in Niamey, Niger, and later donated teaching and sports supplies to the two schools, built water wells and carried out maintenance work for the two schools.

On February 19, 2021, the General Seyni Kountche Bridge, funded by the Chinese government, was completed and opened to traffic. Nigerien President Mahamadou Issoufou and Chinese Ambassador to Niger Zhang Lijun attended the opening ceremony held in the capital Niamey. The General Seyni Kountche Bridge project is also the largest project in the history of Chinese government aid to Niger.

== See also ==
- Oil and mining industry of Niger
