= China–Malawi relations =

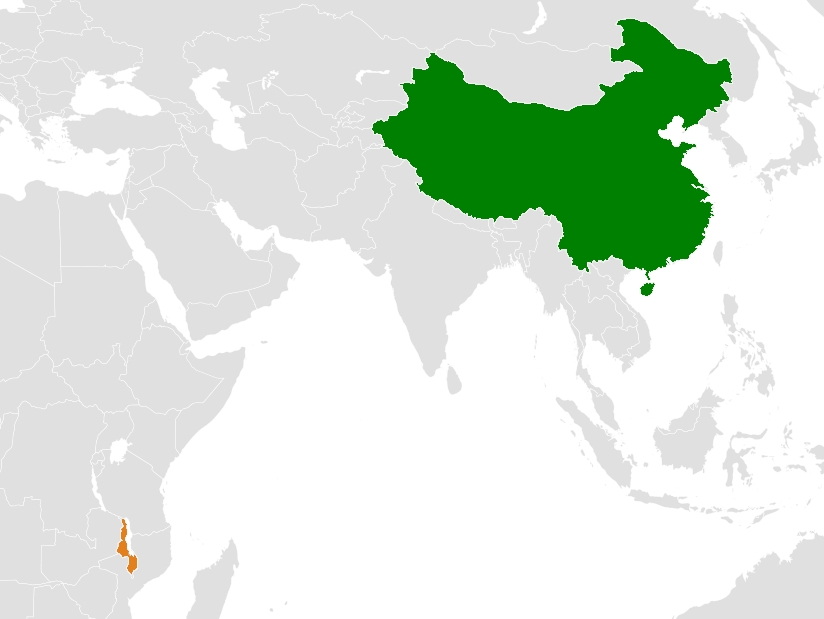
- Malawi: China

Diplomatic mission
- Embassy of Malawi, Beijing: Embassy of China, Lilongwe

China–Malawi relations refers to the diplomatic relations between Malawi and China. Malawi has an embassy in Beijing. China has an embassy in Lilongwe. Malawi had relations with the ROC based on Taiwan, but broke the relations in 2008.

== History ==
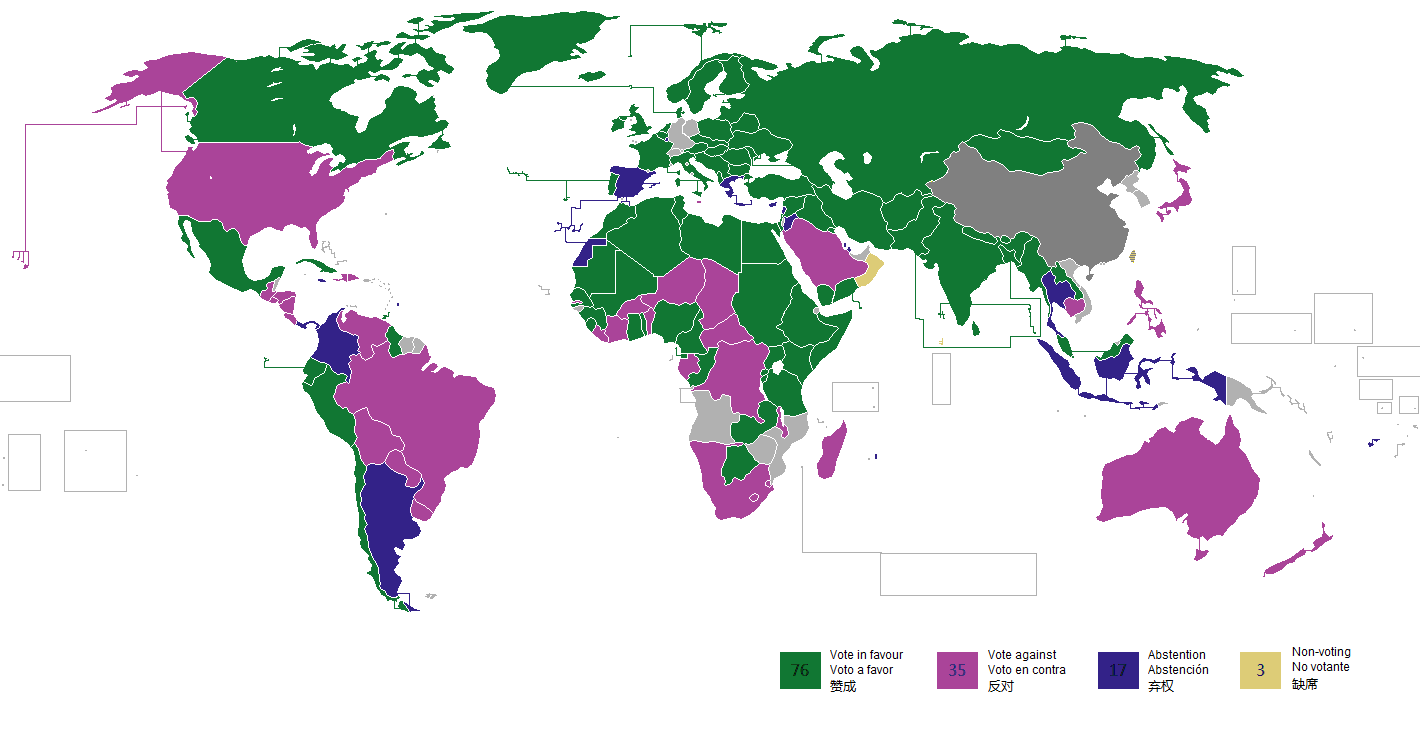
Malawi voted against in an attempt to keep the seat of Nationalist China in the United Nations.

Malawi and China have had diplomatic relations since 2008, when Malawi established ties with China over Taiwan. On December 28, 2007, the Chinese Foreign Ministry announced in Beijing that China and Malawi had established diplomatic relations. To do so, Malawi had to cut off the 41-year-old relationship it had with Taiwan. Then Malawi Minister for Foreign Affairs, Joyce Banda, stated that, "The government of the Republic of Malawi recognizes that there is but one China in the world ... and that Taiwan is an inalienable part of China's territory." Malawi and China then formalized their relations by the signing of a joint communique in Beijing.

Upon the 2012 death of Malawi President Bingu wa Mutharika, many people wondered what would happen to the China–Malawi relationship with the new president of Malawi, Joyce Banda. The Chinese ambassador to Malawi, Pan Hejun, assured everyone, "The relationship between Malawi and China is at all time high and we very much support reforms president Mrs. Banda is undertaking and I want to assure her and all Malawians of our continued financial support in all sectors of the economy."

In a speech given by Pan Hejun, he stated why China is interested in developing relations with Malawi. He stated the long history between the two nations and he also stated how the African nations helped China in the past by saying, "We Chinese people never forget that in 1972, it was the African brothers, together with other friendly countries helped China restore its seat in the United Nations." He finished up his statement by saying how China has given great culture and fortune to the African nations, and how these two nations and their relationship has high hopes for the future.

Malawi has served as a source of illegal wildlife trafficking to China, particularly products related to ivory and pangolins.

Malawi follows the one China principle. It recognizes the People's Republic of China as the sole government of China and Taiwan as an integral part of China's territory, and supports all efforts by the PRC to "achieve national reunification". It also considers Hong Kong, Xinjiang and Tibet to be China's internal affairs.

== Economic relations ==
From 2000 to 2012, there are approximately 21 Chinese official development finance projects identified in Malawi through various media reports. These projects range from a $70 million grant to build the Karonga-Chitipa highway linking Malawi with neighbouring Zambia in 2008, to an $80 million loan from the Export Import Bank of China to construct a university for science and technology in the district of Thyolo in 2011.
