= Zhou Pingjian =

Chinese ambassador to Nigeria

Zhou Pingjian (Chinese: 周平剑; pinyin: Zhōu píngjiàn) is the former Chinese ambassador to Nigeria. Zhou was confirmed in 2016. He left the post in 2020.

Zhou Pingjian is the current Chinese ambassador to Kenya.
