= Ultimate Hero =

- Poster
- Chinese: 终极硬汉
- Directed by: Cui Lei; Dragon Chen
- Production companies: Shanxi Media Group; Beijing Tianxing Brother Entertainment; Sichuan Luzhou Tianxing Entertainment Art Specialty Institute; Beijing Daai Lianmeng Media
- Distributed by: Beijing Huanying Shidai Media
- Release date: August 19, 2016 (China)
- Running time: 95 minutes
- Countries: China; United States
- Languages: Mandarin; English
- Box office: CN¥4.5 million (China)

Ultimate Hero (Chinese: 终极硬汉) is a 2016 Chinese-American action adventure crime film directed by Cui Lei and Dragon Chen. It was released in China by Beijing Huanying Shidai Media on August 19, 2016.

== Plot ==
Ultimate Hero follows a man named Han Feng as he attempts to stop a gang of arms smugglers in Africa, from getting their hands on a very rare new energy ore stone.

== Cast ==
- Dragon Chen
- Alexandre Bailly
- Luc Bendza
- Zeddy Benson
- Gian Derek
- Warwica Gilles
- Doug Babaru
- Israel
- Liu Yongqi
- Yu Zhenhuan

== Reception ==
The film has grossed CN¥4.5 million at the Chinese box office.
