= China–Eswatini relations =

- China: Eswatini

China–Eswatini relations refers to the bilateral relations between the People's Republic of China and the Kingdom of Eswatini. The two countries have never established diplomatic relations. Eswatini established diplomatic relations with the Republic of China after its independence in 1968 and has maintained such relations to this day. Currently, China's affairs with Eswatini are also handled by the Embassy of China in South Africa.

== History ==
Since Swaziland established diplomatic relations with the Republic of China at the beginning of its independence, there are few official exchanges between Swaziland and the People's Republic of China. In September 1972, Premier Zhou Enlai of the State Council of the People's Republic of China sent a congratulatory message to Swaziland on the fourth anniversary of its independence. In October 1992, Gu Yingqiu, Executive Vice President of the Chinese Red Cross Society, led a delegation to attend the 30th Executive Council Meeting of the International Federation of Red Crosses held in Mbabane, during which he met with King Mswati III of Swaziland. In May 2018, after Burkina Faso severed diplomatic relations with the Republic of China and established diplomatic relations with the People's Republic of China, Chinese Foreign Minister Wang Yi called on Swaziland to participate in the Forum on China-Africa Cooperation, but the Republic of China Foreign Minister Joseph Wu quoted the Swaziland ambassador as saying that he disdained the call from the People's Republic of China.

On January 31, 2020, the Embassy of China in South Africa issued a statement criticizing Eswatini, saying that "without diplomatic relations, there are no commercial interests" and that "it is an embarrassing situation that Eswatini openly defies the one-China principle and maintains so-called 'diplomatic relations' with Taiwan, a province of the People's Republic of China." It also pointed out that "Swatini has no diplomatic relations with China, but enjoys economic and trade benefits, which is unfair to more than 1.4 billion Chinese people." The government of China also stipulates that citizens of Eswatini can only apply for visas at the country's embassy in South Africa.

On March 22, 2024, when asked to comment on the visit of the Prime Minister of Eswatini to Taiwan, the spokesperson of the Chinese Ministry of Foreign Affairs said that "the Taiwan authorities use the hard-earned money of the people on the island to support a small number of powerful people in Eswatini" and "the small number of people in power in Eswatini are going against the trend and maintaining so-called "diplomatic relations" with Taiwan. This is unpopular and is doomed to not last long."

In stark contrast to the current monarchy in Eswatini, the Communist Party of Swaziland, which is firmly opposed to the former, strongly condemned the latter's continued diplomatic relations with the Republic of China, and even accused the latter of "trying to pose as a bona fide nation state have always been designed as a means of destabilizing the PRC". It also stated that it would abolish the monarchy in Eswatini in the future and establish diplomatic relations with the People's Republic of China after successfully seizing power.
