= China–Mauritania relations =

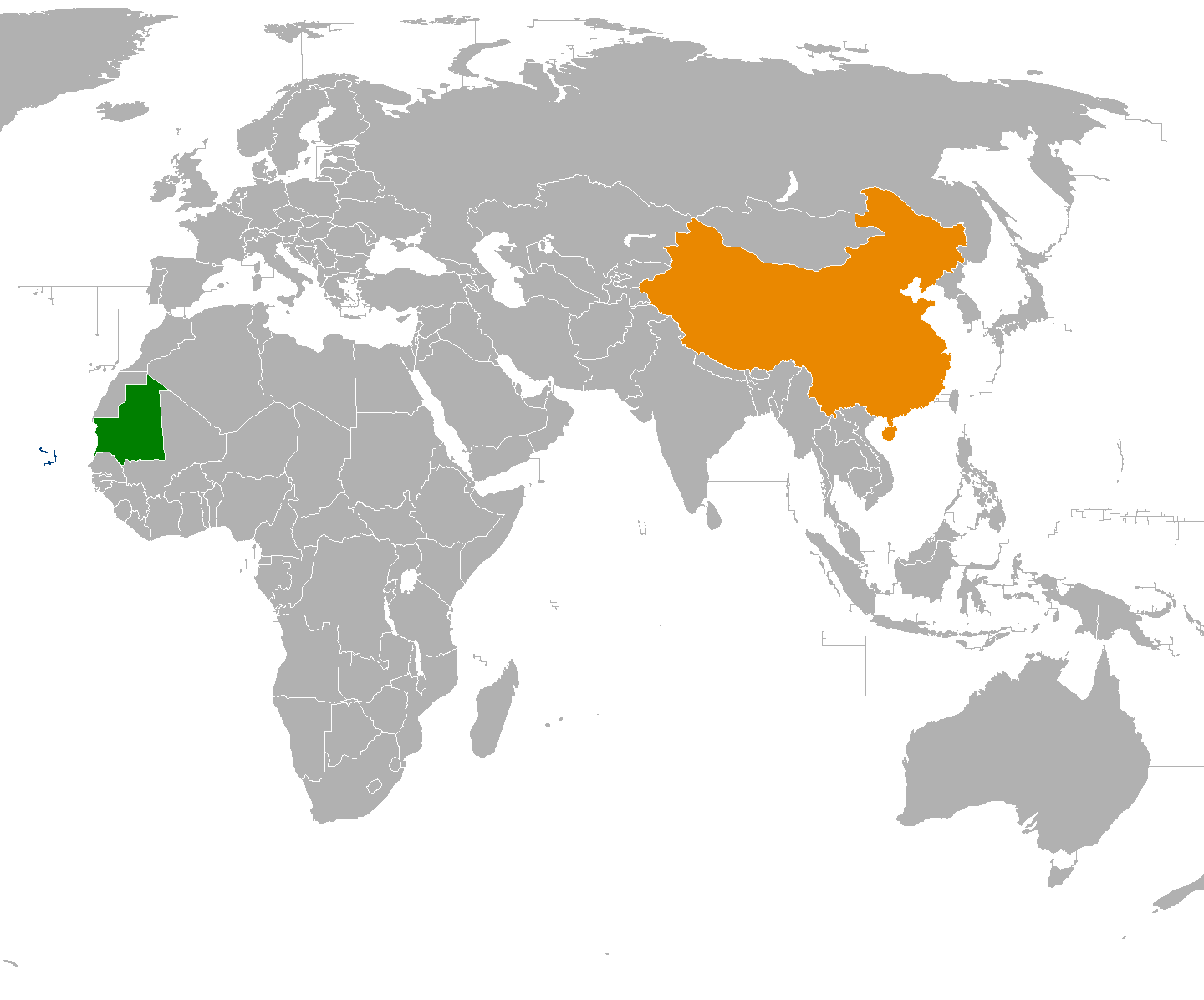
- Mauritania: China

Diplomatic mission
- Mauritanian Embassy, Beijing: Chinese Embassy, Nouakchott

China–Mauritania relations refer to the bilateral relations between China and Mauritania. China and Mauritania established diplomatic relations on July 19, 1965.China has an embassy in Nouakchott. Mauritania has an embassy in Beijing.

== History ==
The government of Mauritania enjoys close ties with the government of the People's Republic of China. In recent years, they have signed a series of agreements and exchanged a series of diplomatic gestures that have strengthened their relationship. The Chinese government has recently shown particular interest in Mauritania's oil deposits. Oil production in Mauritania began in February 2006, and by May of the same year the Chinese and Mauritanian governments signed an agreement on social and economic cooperation. In October 2006, the state-owned China National Petroleum Corporation began drilling oil wells in Mauritania, and has three other prospecting permits in Mauritania. The Mauritanian government sees oil production as a significant means of boosting economic growth.

During the campaign for Mauritania's presidential elections in March 2007, candidate Sidi Ould Cheikh Abdallahi praised Mauritania's growing ties with China, promising to "continue the path of strengthening the bilateral relations with all my efforts".

== Political relations ==
Mauritania follows the one China principle. It recognizes the People's Republic of China as the sole government of China and Taiwan as an integral part of China's territory, and supports all efforts by the PRC to "achieve national reunification". It also considers Hong Kong, Xinjiang and Tibet to be China's internal affairs.

In June 2020, Mauritania was one of 53 countries that backed the Hong Kong national security law at the United Nations.

== Economic relations ==
In 1977, China and Mauritania signed an agreement for China to provide Mauritania with an interest free loan over US$150 million and to build Mauritania's Friendship Port of Nouakchott. China completed the port and gave control of it to Mauritania in July 1986, making it Mauritania's first deep-water port. At the time, it was the second largest Chinese foreign aid project. China also provided Mauritania with other financing for transportation infrastructure over the course of the 1970s and 1980s.

From 2000 to 2012, there are approximately 15 Chinese official development finance projects identified in Mauritania through various media reports. These projects range from extending the Nouakchott Port by 900 meters through a preferential loan of 2 billion Chinese yuan from China's Ex-Im Bank, to a loan of US$136 million from Chinese government to construct a new international airport at Nouakchott.

Mauritania joined the Belt and Road Initiative (BRI) in 2018.
