= List of diplomatic partnerships of China =

Countries with which China has established diplomatic partnerships

People's Republic of China Traditional friendly and cooperative relations (North Korea; outside the partnership system) Comprehensive strategic partnership of coordination (Russia) All-weather strategic partnership Comprehensive strategic partnership Strategic partnership Partnership Friendly cooperative relationship Diplomatic relationship Special friendship in the new era (Cuba) Constructive strategic and stable relationship (United States) Mutually beneficial relationship based on common strategic interests (Japan) No diplomatic relations

This is a list of countries with which the People's Republic of China has established diplomatic partnerships. Partnership refers to an international cooperative relationship in which countries (regions, organizations) cooperate in the political, economic, scientific, cultural and other fields because of trust. As of the end of May 2024, China maintains diplomatic relations with 185 countries, of which 180 it has signed cooperation or partnership agreements with; if international organizations are included, the number rises to 190. The diplomatic levels of China can be roughly divided into five types: general partnership, comprehensive or all-round partnership, general strategic partnership, comprehensive, global or all-round strategic partnership, and all-weather or permanent strategic partnership. A community of shared destiny relationship has also emerged in recent years.

== Framework ==
China establishes bilateral partnerships with other countries that range from broad strategic partnerships to those with more discrete areas of cooperation. The diplomatic levels of China can be roughly divided into five types: general partnership, "comprehensive" or "all-round" partnership, general strategic partnership, "comprehensive", "global" or "all-round" strategic partnership, and "all-weather" or "permanent" strategic partnership. "Comprehensive strategic partnerships" are the broadest, with "strategic partnerships" and "comprehensive cooperative partnerships" used to describe relations with less broad cooperation. Partnership refers to an international cooperative relationship in which countries (regions, organizations) cooperate in the political, economic, scientific, cultural and other fields because of trust. China generally avoids signing formal alliances and bilateral treaties. It describes this position as "relationship based on partnership rather than alliance" (jieban bujiemeng).

As of the end of May 2024, China has diplomatic relations with 185 countries, of which 180 it has signed cooperation or partnership agreements; if international organizations is added, the number reaches 190.

== Community of shared future ==
A map of countries with which China has established community of shared future partnerships

"Community of shared future” refers to countries or international organizations that have established a high-level strategic partnership with China and have carried out broader and deeper cooperation, while expressing their recognition of China's values of promoting "building a community of shared future for mankind”, participating in China's Belt and Road initiative and supporting China's global initiatives, and are willing to support and cooperate in China's vision of global governance.

=== Bilateral community of shared future ===
Name	Chinese name	Countries	Ref.
All-weather community of shared future in the new era	新时代全天候命运共同体	Cambodia	
High-quality, high-level and high-standard community of shared future in the new era	高质量、高水平、高标准的新时代命运共同体	Laos	
Closer community of shared future in the new era	新时代更加紧密的命运共同体	Pakistan	
Community with a shared future for mankind in the new era	新时代命运共同体	Egypt, Gabon, Kenya, Mozambique, Serbia, Solomon Islands, Togo	
High-level community of shared future	高水平命运共同体	Nigeria, Republic of the Congo, Senegal, South Africa, Zimbabwe	
Community of shared future	命运共同体	Cuba, Malaysia, Myanmar, Turkmenistan, Uzbekistan	
Community with a shared future of everlasting friendship, high mutual trust and shared future	世代友好、高度互信、休戚与共的命运共同体	Kazakhstan	
Community of shared future with everlasting friendship, shared weal and woe, mutual benefit and win-win	世代友好、休戚与共、互利共赢的命运共同体	Tajikistan	
Community of shared destiny with good neighborliness, friendship and shared prosperity	睦邻友好、共享繁荣的命运共同体	Kyrgyzstan	
Community of shared future for mankind: peaceful coexistence, mutual assistance and win-win cooperation	和平共处、守望相助、合作共赢的命运共同体	Mongolia	
Community with a shared future for a more just world and a more sustainable planet	更公正世界和更可持续星球的命运共同体	Brazil	
More stable, more prosperous and more sustainable community with a shared future	更为稳定、更加繁荣、更可持续的命运共同体	Thailand	
Strategically significant community of shared destiny	具有战略意义的命运共同体	Vietnam (Note: Translated as "community of shared future” by the Vietnamese side.)	
Community with a shared future with regional and global influence	具有地区和全球影响力的命运共同体	Indonesia	

=== Multilateral community with a shared future ===
Name	Chinese name	Organization/region	Ref.
All-weather community of shared future in the new era	新时代全天候命运共同体	African Union	
Community of shared future in the new era	新时代命运共同体	Arab League	
Closer community of shared future	更为紧密的命运共同体	ASEAN, Central Asia, Pacific island nations	
Community of shared destiny	命运共同体	Community of Latin American and Caribbean States	

== Partners ==
Strategic partnership requires that the cooperation between the two sides is based on national security interests and has consistency in terms of overall, global and core interests. Comprehensive strategic partnership means that the two sides have a wider range of cooperation areas. It is a higher level of strategic relationship and covers a more comprehensive range. There is no specific explanation for the modifiers such as "new era", "all-weather" and "all-round". In short, they all represent that the bilateral cooperation is closer than the general comprehensive strategic partnership, and the areas of bilateral cooperation are deeper and broader.

=== Comprehensive strategic partnership of coordination ===
Name	Chinese name	Countries	Ref.
Comprehensive strategic partnership of coordination for a new era	新时代全面战略协作伙伴关系	Russia	

=== All-weather strategic partnership ===
Name	Chinese name	Countries	Ref.
All-weather comprehensive strategic partnership for a new era	新时代全天候全面战略伙伴关系	Hungary, Uzbekistan	
All-weather comprehensive strategic partnership	全天候全面战略伙伴关系	Belarus	
All-weather strategic cooperative partnership	全天候战略合作伙伴关系	Pakistan	
All-weather strategic partnership	全天候战略伙伴关系	Ethiopia, Venezuela	
Permanent comprehensive strategic partnership	永久全面战略伙伴关系	Kazakhstan	

=== Comprehensive strategic partnership ===
Name	Chinese name	Countries	Ref.
Comprehensive strategic partnership in the new era	新时代全方位战略合作伙伴关系	South Africa	
Comprehensive strategic partnership in the new era	新时代全面战略合作伙伴关系	Tajikistan	
Comprehensive strategic partnership of mutual respect and common development in the new era	新时代相互尊重、共同发展的全面战略伙伴关系	Solomon Islands	
Comprehensive strategic partnership in the new Era	新时代全面战略伙伴关系	Kyrgyzstan	
Comprehensive strategic cooperative partnership	全面战略合作伙伴关系	Angola, Bangladesh, Cambodia, Democratic Republic of the Congo, Equatorial Guinea, Gabon, Guinea, Kenya, Madagascar, Maldives, Mozambique, Myanmar, Namibia, Republic of the Congo, Senegal, Sierra Leone, Tanzania, Thailand, Vietnam, Zambia, Zimbabwe	
All-round strategic partnership	全方位战略伙伴关系	Germany	
Long-term, consistent comprehensive strategic partnership	长期稳定的全面战略伙伴关系	United Kingdom	
Comprehensive strategic partnership of mutual respect and common development	相互尊重、共同发展的全面战略伙伴关系	Cook Islands, Fiji, Micronesia, Niue, Papua New Guinea, Samoa, Tonga, Vanuatu	
Comprehensive strategic partnership	全面战略伙伴关系	Algeria, Argentina, Australia, Azerbaijan, Bahrain, Brazil, Chile, Denmark, Djibouti, Ecuador, Egypt, France, Georgia, Greece, Indonesia, Iran, Italy, Laos. Malaysia, Mexico, Mongolia, New Zealand, Nigeria, Peru, Poland, Portugal, Rwanda, Saudi Arabia, Serbia, Spain, Timor-Leste, Togo, Turkmenistan, United Arab Emirates, Uruguay	

=== Strategic partnership ===
Name	Chinese name	Countries	Ref.
Strategic partnership for development and prosperity	面向发展与繁荣的世代友好的战略合作伙伴关系	Nepal	
Strategic partnership of sincere mutual assistance and everlasting friendship	真诚互助、世代友好的战略合作伙伴关系	Sri Lanka	
Strategic cooperative partnership	战略合作伙伴关系	Afghanistan, Bangladesh, Brunei, South Korea, Suriname	
Mutually beneficial strategic partnership	互惠战略伙伴关系	Ireland	
Strategic partnership for innovation	创新战略伙伴关系	Switzerland	
Strategic partnership	战略伙伴关系	Armenia, Benin, Bolivia, Botswana, Bulgaria, Burkina Faso, Central African Republic ,Chad, Colombia, Comoros, Costa Rica, Cyprus, Czech Republic, Eritrea, Guinea-Bissau, Iraq, Jamaica, Jordan, Kuwait, Lesotho, Liberia, Malawi, Mali, Mauritania, Mauritius, Morocco, Nicaragua, Niger, Oman, Palestine, Qatar, São Tomé and Príncipe, Seychelles, Slovakia, Somalia, South Sudan, Sudan, Syria, Tunisia, Ukraine	
New strategic partnership	新型战略伙伴关系	Canada	
Closer development partnership	更加紧密的发展伙伴关系	India	
Strategic partnership	战略合作关系	Turkey	
Friendly strategic partnership	友好战略伙伴关系	Austria	

=== Partnership ===
Name	Chinese name	Countries	Ref.
All-round friendly and cooperative partnership	全方位友好合作伙伴关系	Belgium	
Comprehensive, friendly and cooperative partnership	全面友好合作伙伴关系	Romania	
Open and pragmatic comprehensive cooperative partnership	开放务实的全面合作伙伴关系	Netherlands	
Comprehensive partnership	全面合作伙伴关系	Croatia, Trinidad and Tobago, Uganda	
New-type cooperative partnership	面向未来的新型合作伙伴关系	Finland	
Comprehensive strategic partnership	全面战略合作关系	Philippines	
Innovative comprehensive partnership	创新全面伙伴关系	Israel	
All round high quality future oriented partnership	全方位高质量的前瞻性伙伴关系	Singapore	

=== Special partnership ===
Name	Chinese name	Countries	Ref.
Special friendship in the new era	新时代特殊友好关系	Cuba	

== Non-partner ==
Name	Chinese name	Countries	Ref.
Friendly cooperative relations	友好合作关系	Andorra, Antigua and Barbuda, the Bahamas Barbados, Bosnia and Herzegovina, Burundi, Cameroon, Dominica, Estonia, Guyana, Iceland, Ivory Coast, Latvia, Lebanon, Libya, North Macedonia, Norway, San Marino, Slovenia, Sweden, Yemen	
Traditional friendly relations	传统友好关系	Albania	
Friendly relations	友好关系	Cape Verde, Ghana, Malta	
Constructive Strategic and Stable Relationship	建设性战略稳定关系	United States	
Mutually beneficial relationship based on common strategic interests	战略互惠关系	Japan	
Regular diplomatic relations		Dominican Republic, El Salvador, Grenada, Honduras, Kiribati, Lithuania, Montenegro, Panama	

== Other ==
Name	Chinese name	Countries	Note	Ref.
Traditional friendly and cooperative relations	传统友好合作关系	North Korea	Due to the Treaty on Friendship, Cooperation and Mutual Assistance between China and North Korea, which is currently the only defense treaty China has with any nation, North Korea is outside China's diplomatic partnership system.	

== Multilateral partnerships ==
Name	Chinese name	Organization	Ref.
Comprehensive strategic partnership	全面战略伙伴关系	Association of Southeast Asian Nations, European Union, Pacific Islands Forum	
New strategic partnership	新型战略伙伴关系	African Union	
Strategic partnership	战略伙伴关系	Arab League, Gulf Cooperation Council	
Comprehensive partnership	全面合作伙伴关系	Community of Latin American and Caribbean States	
