= China–Mozambique relations =

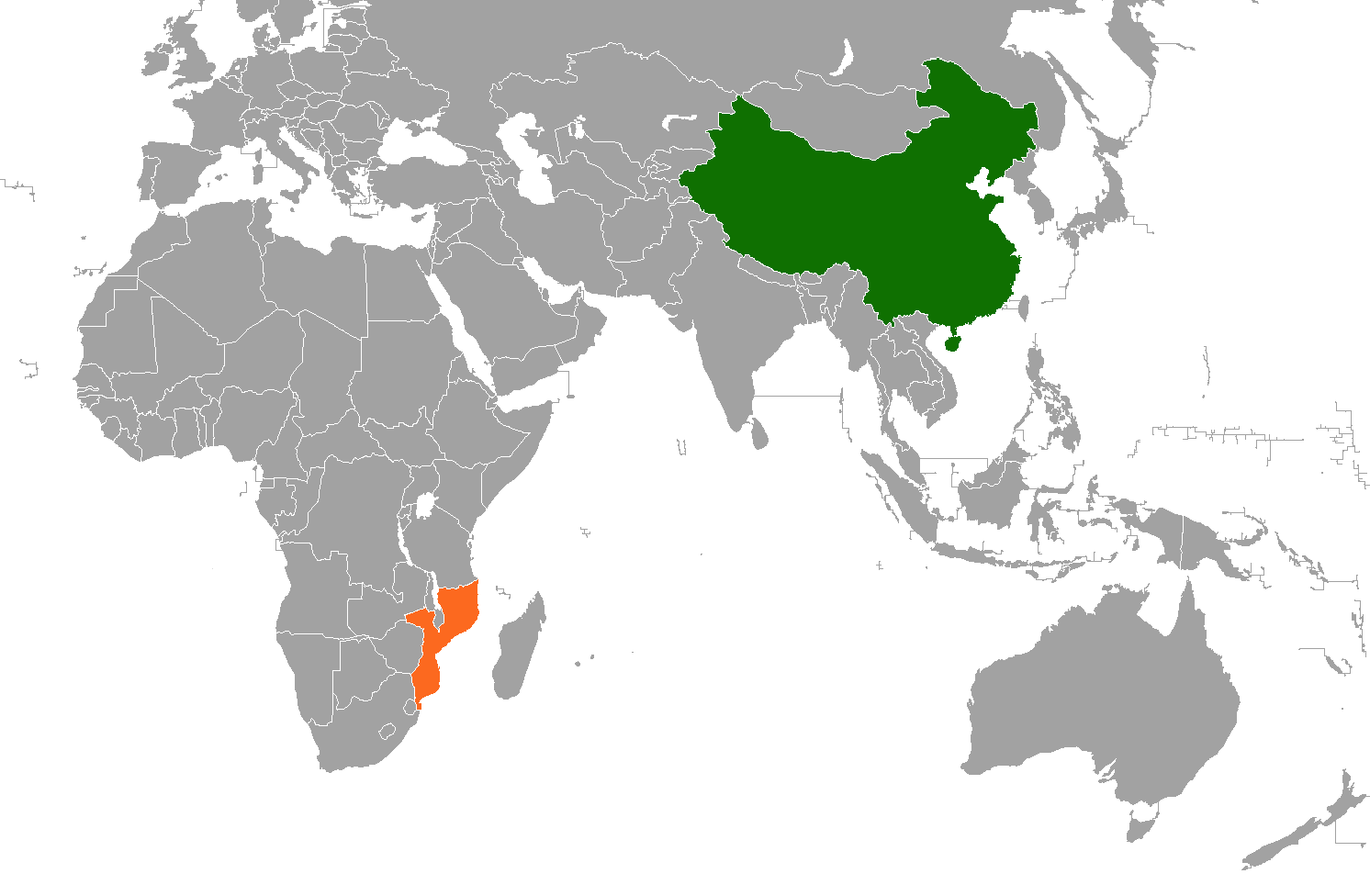
- China: Mozambique

China–Mozambique relations date back to the 1960s, when China began to support the struggle of Mozambique's Marxist-oriented FRELIMO party against Portuguese colonialism. Diplomatic relations were formally established on 25 June 1975, soon after Mozambique gained independence from Portugal. In November 2006, Mozambique became the thirteenth African country to be added to China's official list of tourism destinations. The two countries established a strategic partnership in 2016.

== Bilateral visits ==
Hu Jintao, president of the People's Republic of China, made an official visit to Mozambique in February 2007, during which he and Armando Guebuza, the president of Mozambique, pledged further cooperation in the areas of economy, technology, agriculture, education and sports. Shanghai and Maputo share a sister city relationship.

In 2016, China and Mozambique signed a strategic partnership.

== Movement of people ==
From 1992 to 2003, 22 Mozambicans went to China as international students. Estimates for the number of Chinese nationals residing in Mozambique as of 2007 ranged from 1,500 to 12,000.

== Sovereignty issues ==
Mozambique follows the one China principle. It recognizes the People's Republic of China as the sole government of China and Taiwan as an integral part of China's territory, and supports all efforts by the PRC to "achieve national reunification". It also considers Hong Kong, Xinjiang and Tibet to be China's internal affairs.

In June 2020, Mozambique was one of 53 countries that backed the Hong Kong national security law at the United Nations.

== Economic relations ==
Mozambique and China both participate in the multi-lateral group Forum Macao, which China formed in 2003 to increase economic and commercial cooperation between China and the Portuguese-speaking countries.

China's pattern of trade with Mozambique differs from that with their major trading partners on the African continent, such as Angola, Nigeria, and Sudan. China mainly imports agricultural and fisheries products from Mozambique, but few raw materials, while exporting manufactured goods and machinery. Between 2004 and 2006, bilateral trade tripled in value from US$70 million to US$210 million, making China one of Mozambique's three largest trading partners, behind South Africa and Portugal. China has also become a major buyer of Mozambican timber; despite local regulations forbidding the export of unprocessed logs, which aim to force foreign countries hoping to gain access to Mozambican resources to invest in setting up processing facilities in the country, many logs are exported illegally. Chinese businessmen are not typically involved in the actual practise of logging; instead, it is performed mainly by locals, who then bring the logs to buyers in port cities.

China has also become an increasingly important player in Mozambique's construction industry; over one-third of Mozambique's new road construction is now carried out by Chinese contractors. Contractors from other countries, who have been losing out on business due to their higher costs, complain that the Chinese contractors make no effort to transfer skills or technology to locals, and do not make use of local or regional labour subcontractors, instead preferring to import and manage their own workers. However, Chinese-run construction sites are better-organised and have a lower rate of pilferage. In the first 10 months of 2012, the value of trade was US$1.1 billion, with Mozambique being the 23rd largest trading partner of China.

Mozambique joined the Belt and Road Initiative (BRI) in 2018.

=== Aid ===
In addition to trade, China has begun providing development aid to Mozambique as well. The Export-Import Bank of China have made soft loans to Mozambique for infrastructure construction, for example providing US$60 million in 2006, and have twice cancelled large proportions of the country's debt to China, forgiving US$22 million in 2001 and US$30 million in 2007. They have also built a number of government buildings and public facilities free of charge, such as the national parliament building and the national stadium. According to AidData, from 2000 to 2012, there are approximately 52 Chinese official development finance projects identified in Zimbabwe through various media reports.

On its 2017 medical mission to Africa, the People's Liberation Army Navy hospital ship Peace Ark traveled to Mozambique where its staff treated 9,881 Mozambiquan patients.

== Bibliography ==
- Cardenal, Juan Pablo; Araújo, Heriberto (2011). La silenciosa conquista china (in Spanish). Barcelona: Crítica. pp. 187–194, 225–228. ISBN 9788498922578.
