= Chinese Mozambican =

Chinese Mozambican or Mozambican Chinese may refer to:

- China–Mozambique relations
- Ethnic Chinese in Mozambique
- Mozambicans in China
- Multiracial people of Chinese and Mozambican descent
