= List of ambassadors of China to Gabon =

The ambassador of China to Gabon is the official representative of the People's Republic of China to Gabon.

== List of representatives ==
Name (English)	Name (Chinese)	Tenure begins	Tenure ends	Note
Zhu Guanghai	朱广海	June 1974	August 1974	
Liu Yingxian	刘英仙	August 1974	November 1979	
Liu Yufeng	柳雨峰	November 1979	July 1984	
Tian Yimin	田逸民	July 1984	November 1988	
An Fengshi	安峰石	November 1988	September 1992	
Sun Zhirong	孙治荣	September 1992	December 1995	
Zuo Shusen	左树森	December 1995	November 1998	
Guo Tianmin	郭天民	November 1998	December 2002	
Fan Zhenshui	范振水	December 2002	August 2004	
Xue Jinwei	薛金维	August 2004	October 2008	
Li Fushun	李福顺	October 2008	October 2011	
Sun Jiwen	孙继文	October 2011	April 2016	
Hu Changchun	胡长春	April 2016	September 2022	
Li Jinjin	李津津	September 2022	March 2024	

== See also ==
- China–Gabon relations
