= List of ambassadors of Togo to China =

Coordinates: 39.941768°N 116.454531°E

Ambassador of Togo to China
- Incumbent; Nolana Ta Ama since May 30, 1997
- Inaugural holder: Massenou Dodji Pedanou
- Formation: 1975

The Togolese Ambassador in Beijing is the official representative of the Government in Lomé to the Government of China.

== List of representatives ==
Diplomatic agreement/designated/Diplomatic accreditation	Ambassador	Observations	List of presidents of Togo	Premier of the People's Republic of China	Term end
September 1, 1972		Togo (Diplomatic relations established September 1972	Gnassingbé Eyadéma	Zhou Enlai	
1975	Massenou Dodji Pedanou		Gnassingbé Eyadéma	Zhou Enlai	1975
1975	Anani Akakpo-Ahianyo		Gnassingbé Eyadéma	Zhou Enlai	1978
1979	Blora Yao Agbo		Gnassingbé Eyadéma	Hua Guofeng	1982
1983	Boomdera Allassounouma	Boomdera Alla-Ssounouma	Gnassingbé Eyadéma	Zhao Ziyang	
April 3, 1987	Yao Bloua Agbo		Gnassingbé Eyadéma	Li Peng	
May 30, 1997	Nolana Ta Ama		Gnassingbé Eyadéma	Li Peng	

- China–Togo relations
