= China–Sudan relations =

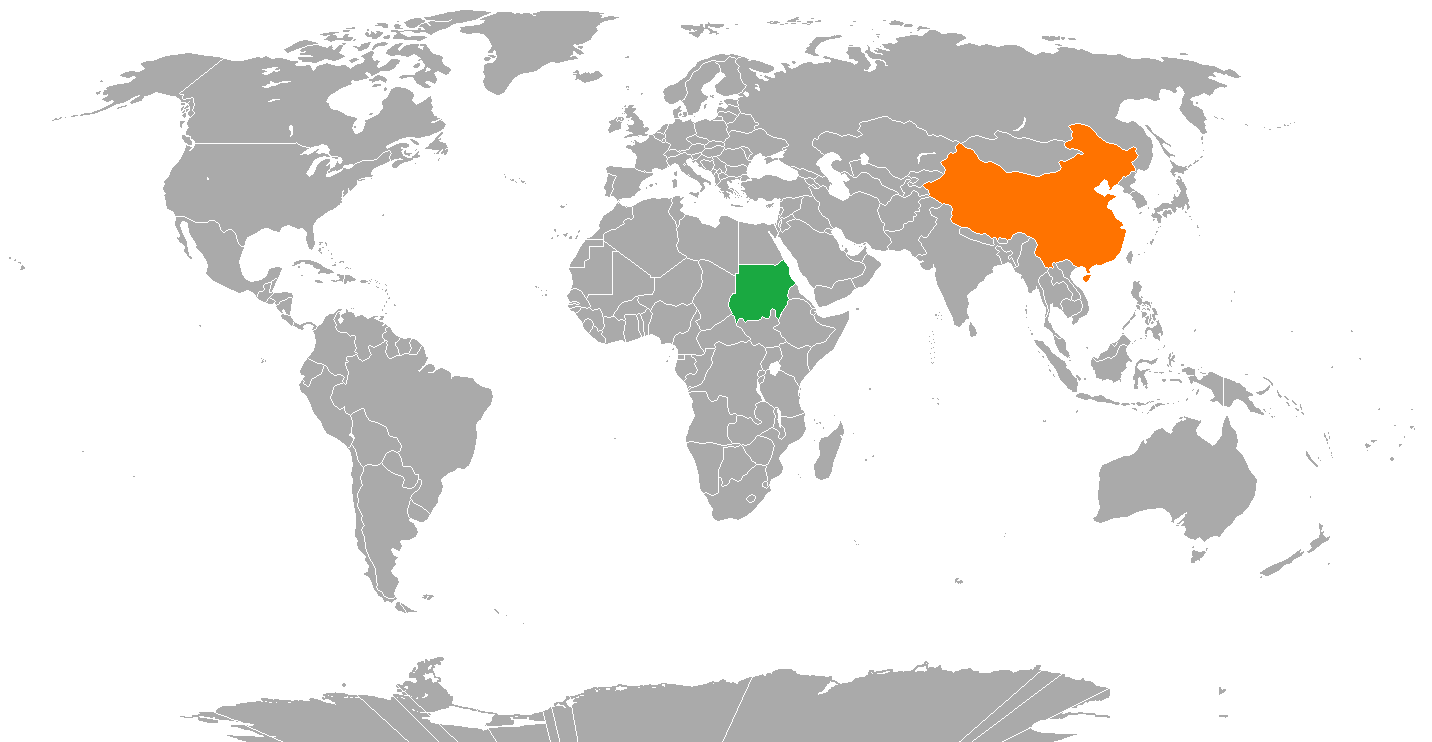

- Sudan: China

Diplomatic mission
- Sudan Embassy, Beijing: China Embassy, Khartoum

China–Sudan relations are the bilateral relations between the People's Republic of China and the Republic of Sudan. China is currently one of Sudan's largest trade partners, importing oil and exporting low cost manufactured items as well as armaments into the country. Both states enjoy a very robust and productive relationship in the fields of diplomacy, economic trade, and political strategy. They formally established diplomatic relations on February 4, 1959, when Sudan formally recognized the sovereignty of the People's Republic of China and have since become close global allies, supporting each other in times of internal crises and international controversy such as during the Second Sudanese Civil War, the Darfur Crisis, and the Xinjiang Conflict. China continues to provide massive support to Sudan by developing its oil resources and supplying millions of dollars in loans, aid, foreign direct investments, and humanitarian assistance. In return, Sudan has become a reliable political and economic ally in the international arena, allowing China to maintain a significant stake in its oil sector.

== History ==
Chinese-Sudanese relations began when Sudan was among the first countries to formally recognize the People's Republic of China in 1959. Since then, relations have amicably developed based on the principles of non-interference, respect for territorial integrity and sovereignty, and mutual benefits and equality.

Economic relations were officially established in the 1960s when both countries signed a 1962 agreement on Economic and Technical Cooperation (ETC) which remains effective today. From this, China began exporting manufactured and capital goods in exchange for Sudan's well sought after cotton. However, it was not until the signing of the 1970 Agreement in Economic and Technical Cooperation and a Cultural, Scientific and Technical Protocol that trade relations were significantly strengthened. In fact, during this time, China began providing aid to Sudan in the form of free-interest loans with no-strings attached, though, this can be viewed more as a symbolic act rather than a political one. Much of this aid was distributed to internal projects such as the building of roads and bridges, investment in textile and agriculture, and the construction of the multi-purpose conference center "Friendship Hall" in Khartoum. Not only did China provide economic support, but also supplied its own workers to help execute various aid projects and sent out batches of doctors to work in Chinese built hospitals that had opened in various parts of Sudan. This contribution allowed Sudan to meet several infrastructural needs and demands for medical services, especially in rural and suburban areas.

Bilateral relations reached unprecedented economic proportions in the 1990s as China became a key player in the development of Sudan's oil sector. During a state visit in 1970, President Gaafar Nimeiri asked China for assistance in several areas including oil prospecting, but was advised to turn to the United States which was more technologically advanced at the time. Several American companies like Chevron began the search for oil which was discovered in the Unity State of Southern Sudan in 1978. However, American-Sudanese relations soon disintegrated with the ousting of Nimeiri from power via military coup. Eventually, in 1997, the U.S. placed sanctions on Sudan, banning all American companies from engaging in its oil sector, after allegations came to light that the government of Omar al-Bashir was supporting terrorists and committing human rights violations. Thus, like Nimeiri, Bashir decided to travel to China in 1995 to request help in developing its oil sector and, this time, China agreed. This appeal came at an opportune moment since China had grown considerable interest in acquiring foreign oil reserves as its own oilfields had already surpassed peak production.

In 2015, the China and Sudan signed a strategic partnership. Sudan joined the Belt and Road Initiative (BRI) in 2018.

== Political relations ==
Sudan follows the one China principle. It recognizes the People's Republic of China as the sole government of China and Taiwan as an integral part of China's territory, and supports all efforts by the PRC to "achieve national reunification". It also considers Hong Kong, Xinjiang and Tibet to be China's internal affairs. In June 2020, Sudan was one of 53 countries that backed the Hong Kong national security law at the United Nations. During the summer of 2019, a support letter was sent to the United Nations Human Rights Council from 37 African, Asian, and Latin American countries who have come to China's defense praising Beijing's achievements in the field of human rights. In the letter, of which Sudan is a signatory, states claim that China has faced grave challenges of terrorism and extremism in which it has taken a series of counter-measures to bring back peace, security, and stability to the region. In 2021, Sudan's ambassador to China, Gafar Karar Ahmed, spoke in support of China's Xinjiang policies at the "Xinjiang in the Eyes of African Ambassadors to China" event. Ahmed stated that the Xinjiang issue is not about human rights, but rather is a political weapon used by Western countries against China.

=== Second Sudanese Civil War ===
The Second Sudanese civil war lasted from 1985 to 2005 and was fought primarily between Khartoum-based government forces in the north and the southern-based rebels. Around 1 to 2 million civilians were killed mostly as a result of starvation and disease. The conflict finally ended with a peace agreement mediated by the Intergovernmental Authority on Development (IGAD) in East Africa. Though China has held onto its commitment of non-interference, a policy that Western countries have often unsuccessfully upheld, the dynamics of the Second Sudanese civil war pressured China's engagement to influence the goals of both the Sudanese government and the Sudan People's Liberation Army and their capabilities to pursue them. At the start of the conflict in 1983, the oilfields in the south were becoming increasingly difficult to explore and with the termination of Chevron's oil installations in 1984, President Bashir sought out China's support. By 1995, China provided major loans for infrastructure improvements, invested $6 billion in the oil sector, and constructed the Greater Nile Pipeline to Port Sudan. The Chinese government took on what seemed like a more neutral approach to the conflict, justifying support for the government of Sudan and opposing the UN's urge for sanctions on the basis of respecting state sovereignty. In 2011, after the secession of South Sudan, China reiterated its commitment to maintaining a close relationship with Khartoum asserting that it would continue supporting the country's development efforts in the oil, agricultural, and mining sectors. Many scholars debate the aims and motives of this response with some arguing that there were no indications that China would benefit substantially if one party were to win while others have claimed that China favored the Sudanese government because it was the only receiver of resources and since the country's main point of contact was through Bashir.

=== Darfur crisis ===
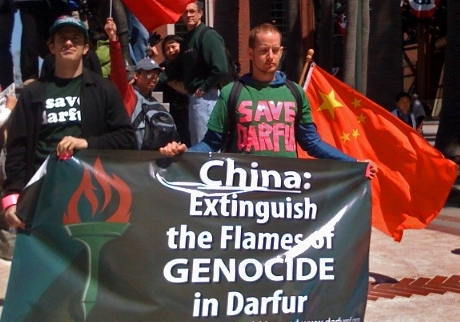
Protesting against China's role in the Darfur Conflict.

Members of the United States Congress, advocacy groups such as the Save Darfur Coalition, and some Hollywood actors called for a boycott of the 2008 Olympic Games in Beijing seeking to pressure China to halt its arms sales and withdraw investments from Sudan. The Save Darfur coalition had turned its attention to China after failing to persuade Western governments to intervene directly. The Save Darfur coalition's view was that China had close ties with Sudan especially in the oil industry and had resisted United Nations Security Resolutions on the crisis in Darfur. China initially opposed any special responsibility to act with regard to the crisis. China's Special Representative on African Affairs Liu Guijin stated that "Darfur is not China's Darfur. Firstly, it is Sudan's Darfur and second it is Africa's Darfur."

After the West had imposed sanctions on Bashir and his government, he publicly commented on the strength of bilateral relations between China and Sudan stating:

From the first day, our policy was clear: To look eastward, toward China, Malaysia, India, Indonesia, Russia, and even Korea and Japan, even if the Western influence upon some [of these] countries is strong. We believe that the Chinese expansion was natural because it filled the space left by Western governments, the United States, and international funding agencies. The success of the Sudanese experiment in dealing with China without political conditions or pressures encouraged other African countries to look toward China.

China responded to international pressure and in February 2007, President Hu Jintao visited Khartoum to pledge a $13 million interest-free loan to build a new presidential palace, $4.8 million in humanitarian assistance to Darfur, and wrote off $70 million of Sudan's debt to China. During the visit, he insisted privately that Bashir settle the Darfur conflict and established four principles for handling the issue. First, he reiterated respect for Sudan's sovereignty and territorial integrity and supported the continuation of Sudan's unity. Second, he called on the disputing parties to resolve the problem through dialogue and consultation. Third, he stated that the African Union and the United Nations should play a constructive role in the peacekeeping process. Lastly, he urged the promotion of stability in Darfur and improvement in living conditions for the local people. This approach departed from China's traditional foreign policy principle of non-interventionism. China also ended up supporting a UN resolution in late April 2007 that urged the Sudanese government to support, protect, and facilitate all humanitarian operations in Darfur. In July 2007, China support of the passage of UN Security Council Resolution 1769 and contributes troops to UN-AU hybrid peacekeeping force(UNAMID). This demonstrates how China needed to strike a balance between its interests in Sudan and the criticism it was receiving from the West. Its desire to successfully hold the 2008 Beijing Olympics warranted its involvement in Sudanese affairs. China's mediation efforts were widely praised within the international community.

=== Coup against Omar Bashir ===
Sudan's longtime president Omar al-Bashir was overthrown in a military coup on April 11, 2019, after almost 30 years as the leader of Sudan. Once his staunchest supporter, China instead supported the new leadership to ensure stability, since Sudan is a strategic location on the prospective Belt and Road initiative.

== Economic relations ==
=== Prospects of oil ===
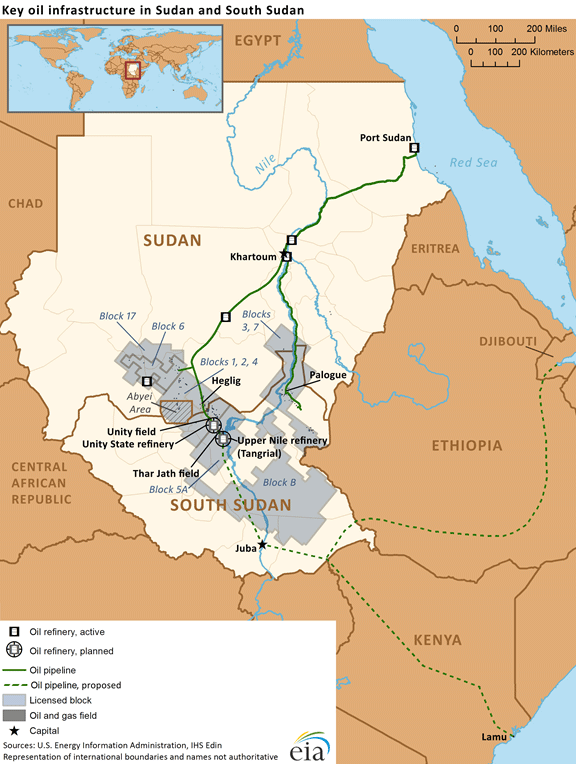
Location of Sudan and South Sudan's oil fields and infrastructure.

Upon independence in 2011, South Sudan secured three-quarters of the oil held by the once unified nation which immediately caused a number of disputes, cross-border violence, and failed negotiation attempts. In order for the oil from South Sudan to be exported, it had to first travel to refineries in Khartoum and be transferred to port terminals in Port Sudan. The price of this transportation was unsettled before the separation of the state which caused disputes that escalated in January 2012 when the Sudanese government claimed that Juba owed $1 billion in unpaid fees. In response, the government of South Sudan accused Khartoum of stealing $815 million worth of oil from their territory. This quickly led to the shutdown of oil production in the south for six months until a partial agreement was reached in August 2012. Presidents of both countries agreed to restart oil exports and demarcate a demilitarized zone, setting the fee for oil transportation at $9.48 per barrel. The government of South Sudan also consented to a $3 billion payout to Khartoum as compensation for the loss of 75% of its oil resources. During this period, Sudan faced serious economic challenges, but it did not seem to negatively affect their relationship with China. As a matter of fact, in August 2017, it was reported that Chinese investments in Sudan's oil sector had surpassed $15 billion and that both countries remained committed to cooperating each other as Sudan was ready to overcome any obstacles in further Chinese investment and China was ready to face challenges regarding Sudan's debt and consequences from the separation of South Sudan.

=== Chinese finance development investments ===
The inflow of China's foreign direct investments (FDI) in Sudan began in 1996 and was primarily driven by oil investments. Even non-oil FDI which was directed towards the service sector and light manufacturing seemed to follow closely with investments in the oil sector. Between 2000 and March 2008 foreign direct investments (FDI) made by Chinese firms, excluding oil, were equivalent to $249 million and bilateral trade between the two countries rose from $103 million in 1990 to $9.7 billion in 2007. By 2010, China became Sudan's largest trading partner and these investments had direct impacts on the economic prospects of the country as its revenue rose exponentially between 2002 and 2008. Moreover, it remained largely untouched by the 2008 financial crisis since its oil exports were managed under long-term contracts in which the price paid for oil gradually increased irrespective of the world market price. Furthermore, the CNPC emphasized the need to pay particular attention in offering local employment and training opportunities not only to comply with Sudan's regulations for transnational corporations, but also because it understood the importance of meeting such labor demands in order to achieve long-term success. From 2000 to 2011, there were approximately 65 Chinese official development finance projects identified in Sudan by various media reports, including helping to construct the presidential palace and railway from Khartoum to Port Sudan, $519 million loan for the hydro-mechanical components of the 1,250 MW Merowe hydroelectric dam, and the construction of a 500 MV coal fired power plant in Port Sudan and a 320 MV gas fired power plant in Rabak at the cost of $512 million by the Shandong Electric Power Construction Corporation in 2005. Overall, China's FDI has had a double effect of expanding the export sector and reducing Sudan's dependence on imported key oil products. The CNPC's investment in the domestic refining capacity of the country has contributed to import substitute industrialization (ISI) which is an economic policy that replaces foreign imports with domestic production and, thus, has given rise to other processing industries based on oil, specifically in plastic products and road construction.

=== Space cooperation ===
In 2019, China launched Sudan's first satellite. It was developed and built by Shenzhen Aerospace Oriental Red Sea Satellite Co. and financed by the Export-Import Bank of China. It was launched from the Taiyuan Satellite Launch Center. Sudan's satellite develops topographic mapping and natural resource data for developmental planning, performs environmental and agricultural monitoring, and has intelligence and defense applications.

== See also ==
- Africa–China relations
- Africa–China economic relations
- China-Africa Development Fund
- Forum on China–Africa Cooperation

== Bibliography ==
- Cardenal, Juan Pablo; Araújo, Heriberto (2011). La silenciosa conquista china (in Spanish). Barcelona: Crítica. pp. 136–140, 159–170. ISBN 9788498922578.
