= China–Qatar relations =

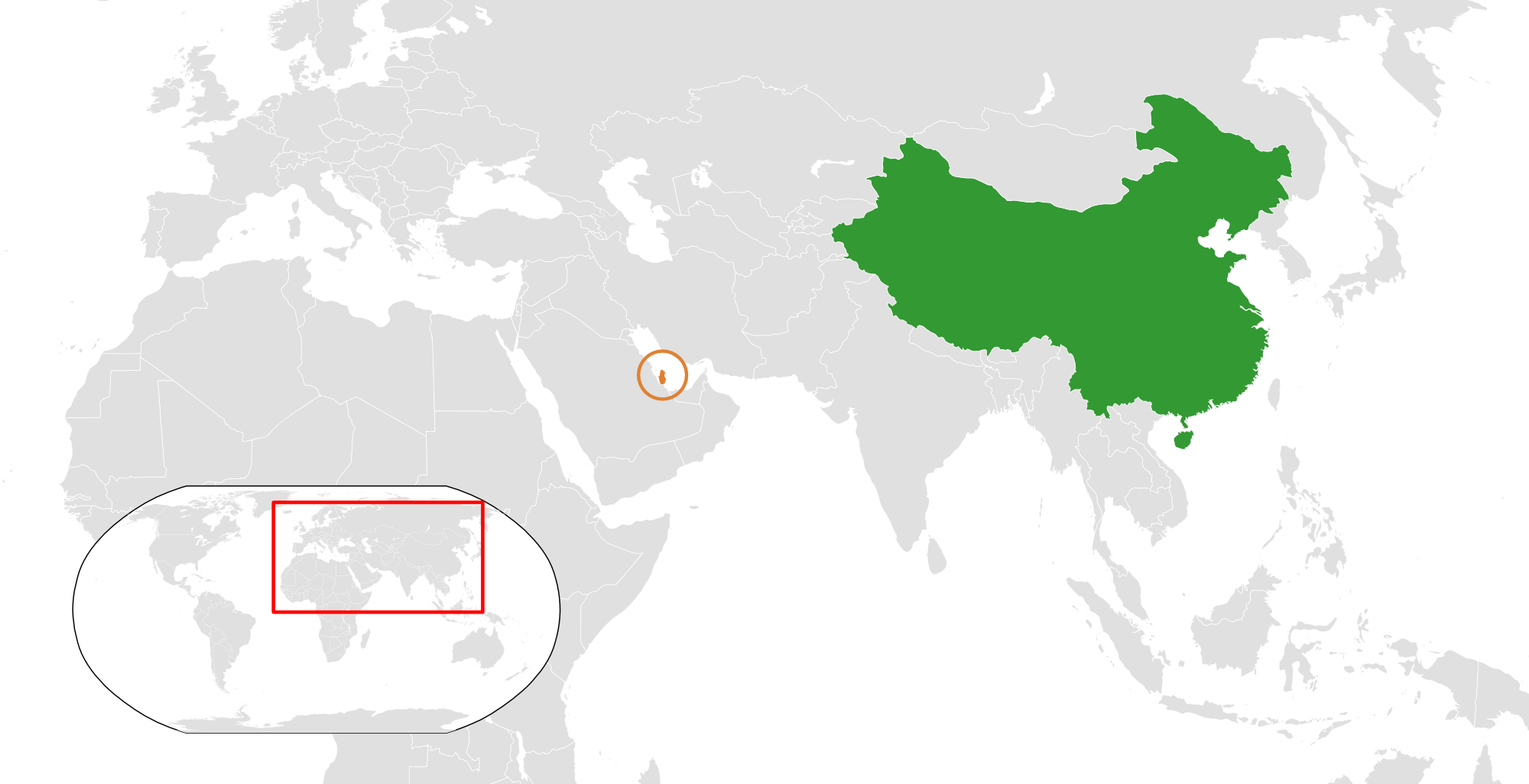

- China: Qatar

China–Qatar relations are the bilateral relations between the People's Republic of China and the State of Qatar. China has an embassy in Doha, while Qatar has an embassy in Beijing. With diplomatic relations first formed in 1988, Qatar is a strategic ally of China, and the two countries maintain a strong relationship.

== Diplomatic visits ==
The first high-level exchange between the countries took place in August 1988 when Vice Foreign Minister Hamad bin Suhaim Al Thani visited Beijing. During the visit, Qatari and Chinese officials examined possible cooperation in sports, culture and economy, and discussed the political developments in the Middle East.

China's Vice Premier Li Lanqing made a trip to Doha in June 1993 and held talks with then-Emir Khalifa bin Hamad Al Thani. These talks centered on ways in which to improve bilateral ties as well as discussions on international and regional politics.

In April 1999, Emir Hamad bin Khalifa Al-Thani became the first Qatari head of state to visit China in a diplomatic capacity. During this visit, he engaged in talks with Chinese President Jiang Zemin and Vice President Hu Jintao. This culminated in the signing of a number agreements relating to air transportation, protection of investments, cultural collaboration and educational collaboration. The two countries' foreign ministries signed a memorandum of understanding.

Emir Tamim bin Hamad Al Thani made his first visit to China in November 2014. While there, he signed a number of accords with the Chinese leader Xi Jinping, one of which entailed the formation of a China-Qatar Strategic Partnership.

== Political cooperation ==
Both countries had minimal contact in the 1950s and 1960s because Qatar was still under the control of the United Kingdom and was regarded as a supporter of capitalism. Furthermore, Qatar had limited nationalist movements and so was unlikely to share the anti-imperialism sentiment of China.

On 10 September 1971, nine days after Qatar was granted its sovereignty, Qatar and China had its first unofficial interaction. A congratulatory message was sent by Premier Zhou and Emir Ahmad bin Ali Al Thani responded on 11 September. Nonetheless, interactions remained at a low level throughout the 1970s. When Qatar fully nationalized its oil industry in February 1977, China reacted positively.

On an official level, the two countries established relations in July 1988. During an April 1999 visit to Beijing by then-Emir Hamad bin Khalifa Al-Thani, the emir expressed his support of the one-China policy. Both countries view Hamas as a legitimate representative of Palestinian people.

Qatar supported China's policies in Xinjiang until August 21, 2019; Qatar was the first Middle Eastern country to withdraw its defense of the Xinjiang re-education camps.

== COVID-19 pandemic ==
During the outbreak of the COVID-19 pandemic in February 2020, Qatar started sending several cargo aircraft with hundreds of tons of medical assistance to Beijing, Shanghai, and Guangzhou. They delivered respirators, sanitizers and medical equipment. Chinese State Councilor and Foreign Minister Wang Yi thanked Qatar for the urgent help.

== Economic relations ==
Countries which signed cooperation documents related to the Belt and Road Initiative

As early as the 1950s, China indirectly exported its goods to Qatar. From 1958 to 1970, Chinese exports to Qatar were valued at $4.7 million. Trade relations improved in the 1970s, with the trade volume from 1970 to 1979 being valued at $73 million. However, this value was the second-lowest in the Persian Gulf region, surpassing only Bahrain.

In December 1987, the China Council for the Promotion of International Trade held its inaugural exhibition in Doha. This exhibition featured industrial products, handicrafts and electronics, among other goods. Trade turnover between the two countries witnessed rapid increases throughout the 1980s with the total bilateral trade volume from 1980 to 1989 being $380 million. The total trade volume in 1991 was $86 million, a massive increase from $49 million in 1989. At the time, the main Qatari exports were fossil fuels, fertilizers and plastics while China primarily exported food items, textiles, papers and construction materials.

A draft agreement stipulating the annual importation of 2.5 million tonnes of LNG from Qatar was signed by China in January 1995. Former Energy Minister Abdullah bin Hamad Al Attiyah visited Beijing in March 1995 and worked with Chinese officials to iron out the details and conclude the agreement.

The Joint Economic and Trade Commission between China and Qatar staged its inaugural meeting in July 2000 in Beijing. Both countries signed an agreement on the avoidance of double taxation in 2001.

Qatar joined the Belt and Road Initiative in 2019.

Qatar became the first Middle Eastern country to open a Chinese Renminbi clearing facility in 2015, doing so as a means to advance economic relations.

In November 2022, Qatar's national oil and gas company QatarEnergy has signed a 27-year contract with China for the supply of liquefied natural gas (LNG). Chinese Sinopec will receive 4 million tons of LNG annually. This is the longest contract in the history of the industry, said QatarEnergy. Qatar is working to expand production at its North gas field in the Persian Gulf, which it shares with Iran. By 2026, Qatar plans to produce 110 million tons of LNG per year instead of the current 77 million tons. Qatar exports most of its gas to Asian countries. In June 2023, China National Petroleum Corporation and QatarEnergy signed second 27-year agreement.

== Military relations ==
Amid the arrival of representatives of the PLA in Doha in April 1998, Qatar was reported to have requested China's collaboration in training its army.

China and Qatar formally agreed to cooperate in counter-terrorism measures in September 2017. During the celebration of Qatar National Day on 18 December 2017, Qatar visibly paraded its Chinese-made ballistic missile system.

== Cultural relations ==
Qatar Museums organized the Qatar–China Year of Culture in 2016. As part of the event, the Museum of Islamic Art in Doha put on display ancient artifacts dating to China's neolithic period as well as terracotta warriors. Katara Cultural Village hosted art exhibitions showcasing contemporary Chinese art. In November 2016, the 'Culture, From Different Angles' exhibition was held at Qatar Museums, featuring the works of both Chinese and Qatari photographers.

== Migration ==
There are roughly 6,000 Chinese citizens living in Qatar as of 2010.

== Chinese Embassy ==
The Chinese embassy is located in Doha.

- Ambassador Zhou Jian

== Qatari Embassy ==
The Qatari embassy is located in Beijing.

- Ambassador Mohammed Abdullah Obaid Al-Dehaimi
