= China–Oman relations =

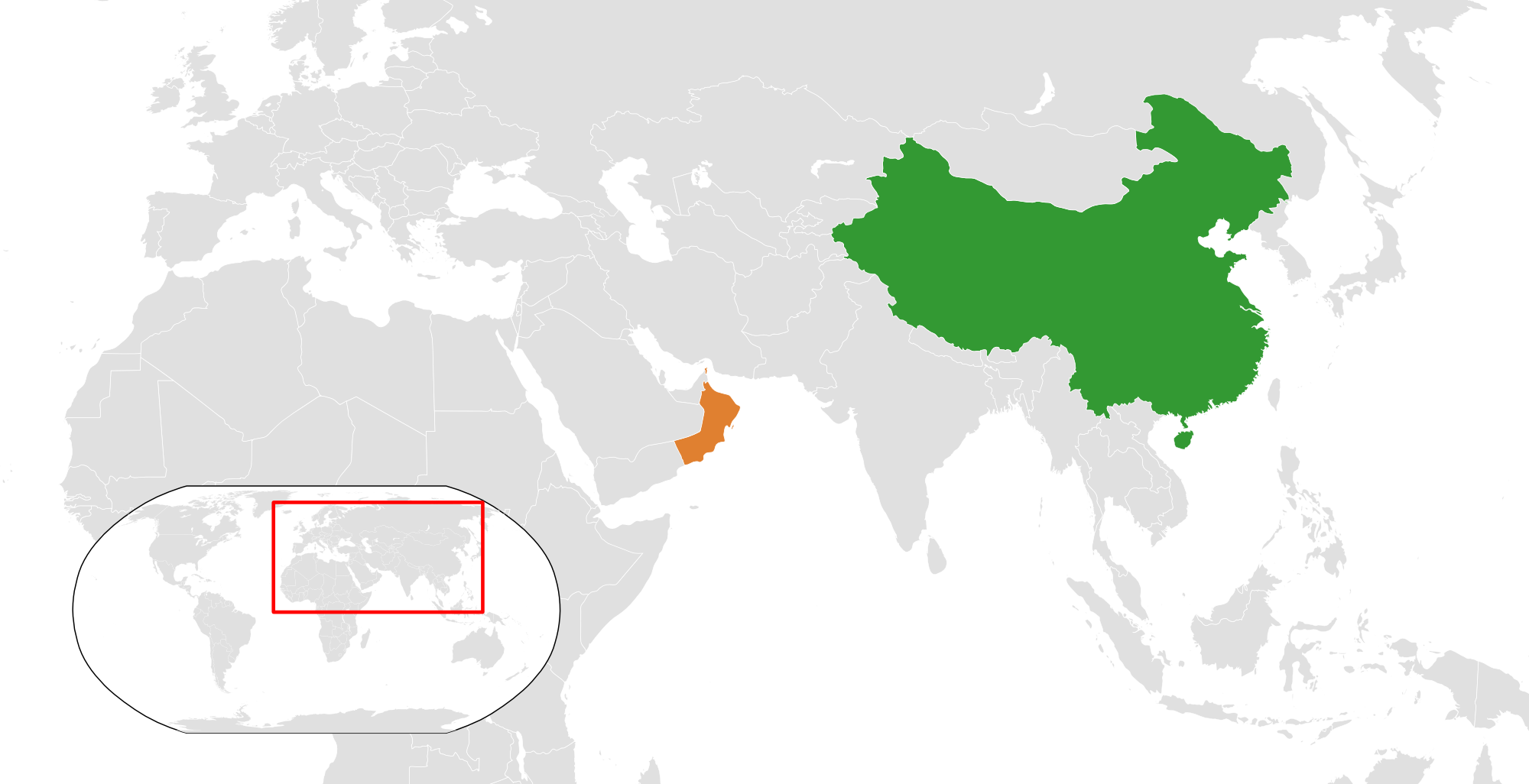

- China: Oman

Diplomatic mission
- Omani Embassy, Beijing: Chinese Embassy, Muscat

The People's Republic of China and Sultanate of Oman established diplomatic relations in 1978. They formed a strategic partnership in 2018.

== History ==
During the Dhofar Rebellion, China supported the Popular Front for the Liberation of Oman. The two countries established diplomatic relations on May 25, 1978.

Chinese officials visiting Oman include: Jia Qinglin, Chairman of the National Committee of the Chinese People's Political Consultative Conference (CPPCC) (November 2010); Zhang Gaoli, Secretary of the Tianjin Municipal Committee (September 2011); Han Qide, Vice Chairman of the Standing Committee of the National People's Congress (February 2012); Ailigen Yiminbahai, Vice Chairman of the National People's Congress (March 2016); Wang Yong, State Councilor (May 2016); Chen Xiaoguang, Vice Chairman of the National Committee of the CPPCC (September 2018); Wang Yang, Chairman of the National Committee of the CPPCC (November 2019); Wang Yi, State Councilor and Foreign Minister (March 2021); and Wei Fenghe, State Councilor and Minister of National Defense (April 2022).

Omani officials visiting China include: Said, Vice Chairman of the Omani National Committee (May 2010); Monzeri, Chairman of the National Committee (attended the Oman National Pavilion Day at the Shanghai World Expo in July 2010); Minister of Foreign Affairs Alawi (came to China in June 2014 to attend the 6th Ministerial Conference of the China-Arab Cooperation Forum, visited China in May 2018, and came to China in July 2018 to attend the 8th Ministerial Conference of the China-Arab Cooperation Forum); Consultative Council Chairman Mawali (May 2016); and Omani Foreign Minister Badr Badr (January 2022).

In 2018, China and Oman agreed to a strategic partnership. Oman joined the Belt and Road Initiative (BRI) that same year.

On March 29, 2021, Chinese Foreign Minister Wang Yi met with Omani Deputy Prime Minister Fahd and the Minister of the Omani Sultanate's Office Sultan in Muscat. He then held talks with Omani Foreign Minister Badr, after which the two sides announced they had reached an agreement on signing a comprehensive visa agreement. Prior to the talks, the two sides jointly witnessed the signing of the implementation plan of the China-Arab government agreement on culture, news and health, and attended the unveiling ceremony of the model of the Zheng He monument.

From 1 to 2 November 2026, Omani Sultan and Prime Minister Haitham bin Tariq visited China, marking the first visit by an Omani head of state to China since diplomatic relations were established in 1978. During the visit, Haitham met with Chinese leader Xi Jinping.

== Economic relations ==
In the 2010s, Beijing invested heavily in projects in Oman through the Belt and Road Initiative. It purchased land in Duqm Port and invested in the first phase of the Duqm Special Economic Zone, intended to be the site of the largest oil storage facility in the Middle East. China stated its intention to build facilities such as an Oil refinery, while also reportedly preparing to build a naval base.
