= China–Jordan relations =

- China: Jordan

Diplomatic mission
- Jordanian Embassy, Beijing: Chinese Embassy, Amman

China–Jordan relations refers to the bilateral relations between the People's Republic of China and the Hashemite Kingdom of Jordan. The two countries established a strategic partnership in 2015.

== History ==
After replacing the Republic of China in the international arena, the People's Republic of China established diplomatic relations with the Hashemite Kingdom of Jordan on April 7, 1977, and began to send an Ambassador to Jordan. In September 2015, China and Jordan established a strategic partnership.

In 2015, Jordan joined the Asian Infrastructure Investment Bank. In 2018, China announced plans to build the Fujian Maritime Silk Road Commodity Center in partnership with the Jordan Ministry of Transportation and a joint Sino-Jordan university in Amman with the aim of strengthening Jordan's role in the Belt and Road Initiative.

The Chinese delegations to Jordan included: Luo Haocai, Vice Chairman of the National Committee of the Chinese People's Political Consultative Conference (June 2007, to attend the Second Entrepreneurs Conference of the China-Arab Cooperation Forum), Jia Qinglin, Member of the Standing Committee of the Political Bureau of the CCP Central Committee and Chairman of the National Committee of the Chinese People's Political Consultative Conference (November 2008), Meng Jianzhu, State Councilor and Minister of Public Security (May 2009), He Guoqiang, Member of the Standing Committee of the Political Bureau of the CCP Central Committee (June 2009), Yang Jiechi, Minister of Foreign Affairs (August 2009), Chen Haosu, President of the China Association for Friendship with Foreign Countries (March 2010), and Chen Xiao, Vice Member of the Standing Committee of the National People's Congress (March 2011). Chairman of the National People's Congress Han Qide (February 2012), Member of the Political Bureau of the CCP Central Committee and Vice Chairman of the National Committee of the Chinese People's Political Consultative Conference Wang Gang (May 2012), Member of the Standing Committee of the Political Bureau of the CCP Central Committee and Chairman of the National Committee of the Chinese People's Political Consultative Conference Yu Zhengsheng (November 2014 ), State Councilor Wang Yong (May 2016), Vice Premier of the State Council Liu Yandong (April 2017), Foreign Minister Wang Yi (June 2017), Vice Chairman of the Standing Committee of the National People's Congress Xiangba Phuntsok (July 2017), and Vice Chairman of the National Committee of the Chinese People's Political Consultative Conference Chen Xiaoguang (September 2018).

Jordanian officials who have visited China include: King Abdullah II (who visited China in October 2007, September 2008, and September 2013, and attended the China-Arab States Expo in September 2015), Senate President Misri (June 2011), Minister of Foreign Affairs and Expatriates Affairs Judah (December 2013), Senate President Rawabid (May 2015), Director of the General Public Security Bureau Atif (October 2016), and Minister of Foreign Affairs and Expatriates Affairs Safadi (who visited China in September 2017 and attended the 8th Ministerial Meeting of the China-Arab Cooperation Forum in July 2018).

== Economic relations ==
In May 1979, China and Jordan signed a trade agreement. The People's Republic of China is Jordan's main importer, accounting for 9.4% of Jordan's total imports. In 2022, the total trade volume between China and Jordan was US$6.451 billion, a year-on-year increase of 46.08%, of which China's exports were US$5.707 billion and imports were US$744 million, up 43% and 75% year-on-year respectively. The People's Republic of China mainly exports electromechanical products, communication equipment, and textiles and clothing to Jordan. The main imports from Jordan are potash fertilizers.

Between 1999 and 2009, China has offered Jordan 17 grants with a total amount of $57.1 million in order to fund development projects in the country. The China Fair Jordan has been held annually in Jordan since 2004. In 2015, Jordan and China signed investment agreements valued at more than $7 billion over various sectors such as transportation, energy, and trade sectors, including an estimated $2.2 billion oil shale power plant.

== Cultural relations ==
In 1979, China and Jordan signed a cultural cooperation agreement. In 2009, the University of Jordan opened a Chinese undergraduate class. In May 2013, the China Radio International Amman FM94.5 FM station in Jordan officially launched its main frequency project, broadcasting Arabic programs 24 hours a day. In January 2018, China and Jordan signed the "Agreement between the Government of the People's Republic of China and the Government of the Hashemite Kingdom of Jordan on the Establishment of a Chinese Cultural Center in Jordan", and the Amman Chinese Cultural Center will be put into use in 2021. The People's Republic of China has established two Confucius Institutes in Jordan, namely the Amman TAG Confucius Institute and the Philadelphia University Confucius Institute.

In October 2003, China and Jordan signed the "Memorandum of Understanding on the Implementation Plan for Chinese Tourist Groups to Jordan". In December 2004, the Chinese tourist group travel business to Jordan was launched. In February 2009, Jordan provided visa-on-arrival treatment to Chinese citizens.
