= Sun Jiwen =

Chinese diplomat

- 孙继文

Ambassador of the People's Republic of China to Gabon
- In office May 2012 – October 2016
- Preceded by: Li Fushun
- Succeeded by: Hu Changchun

Consul-General of the People's Republic of China in Strasbourg
- In office May 2009 – January 2012
- Preceded by: Li Fushun

Personal details
- Born: November 1955 (age 70) Beijing, China
- Party: Chinese Communist Party
- Spouse: Yang Baozhen
- Education: University of Mons; University of Antwerp

Chinese name
- Simplified Chinese: 孙继文
- Traditional Chinese: 孫繼文
Transcriptions
Standard Mandarin
- Hanyu Pinyin: Sūn Jìwén

Sun Jiwen (Chinese: 孙继文; born November 1955) is a Chinese diplomat who served as consul-general of the People's Republic of China in Strasbourg from 2009 to 2012 and ambassador of the People's Republic of China to Gabon from 2012 to 2016.

== Early life and education ==
Born in Beijing in November 1955, Sun graduated from the University of Mons and University of Antwerp.

== Career ==
He served successively at the Embassy of the People's Republic of China in Belgium, the Translation Office of the Ministry of Foreign Affairs, and the United Nations Office at Geneva during his early years. In 1999, he became a counsellor of the Permanent Mission of the People's Republic of China to the United Nations.

He returned to China in 2003 and that same year became counsellor of the Translation Office of the Ministry of Foreign Affairs.

In 2008, he was a visiting scholar at the Georgetown University. In May 2009 he succeeded Li Fushun as consul-general of the People's Republic of China in Strasbourg, serving in that position from 2009 to 2012. In May 2012, he was named acting ambassador of the People's Republic of China to Gabon, replacing Li Fushun.

== Personal life ==
Sun married Yang Baozhen (杨宝珍).

Diplomatic posts
Preceded by Li Fushun	Consul-General of the People's Republic of China in Strasbourg; 2009–2012	Succeeded by Zhang Guobin
Preceded by Li Fushun	Ambassador of the People's Republic of China to Gabon; 2012–2016	Succeeded by Hu Changchun
