= Angola–China relations =

Bilateral relations between Angola and China

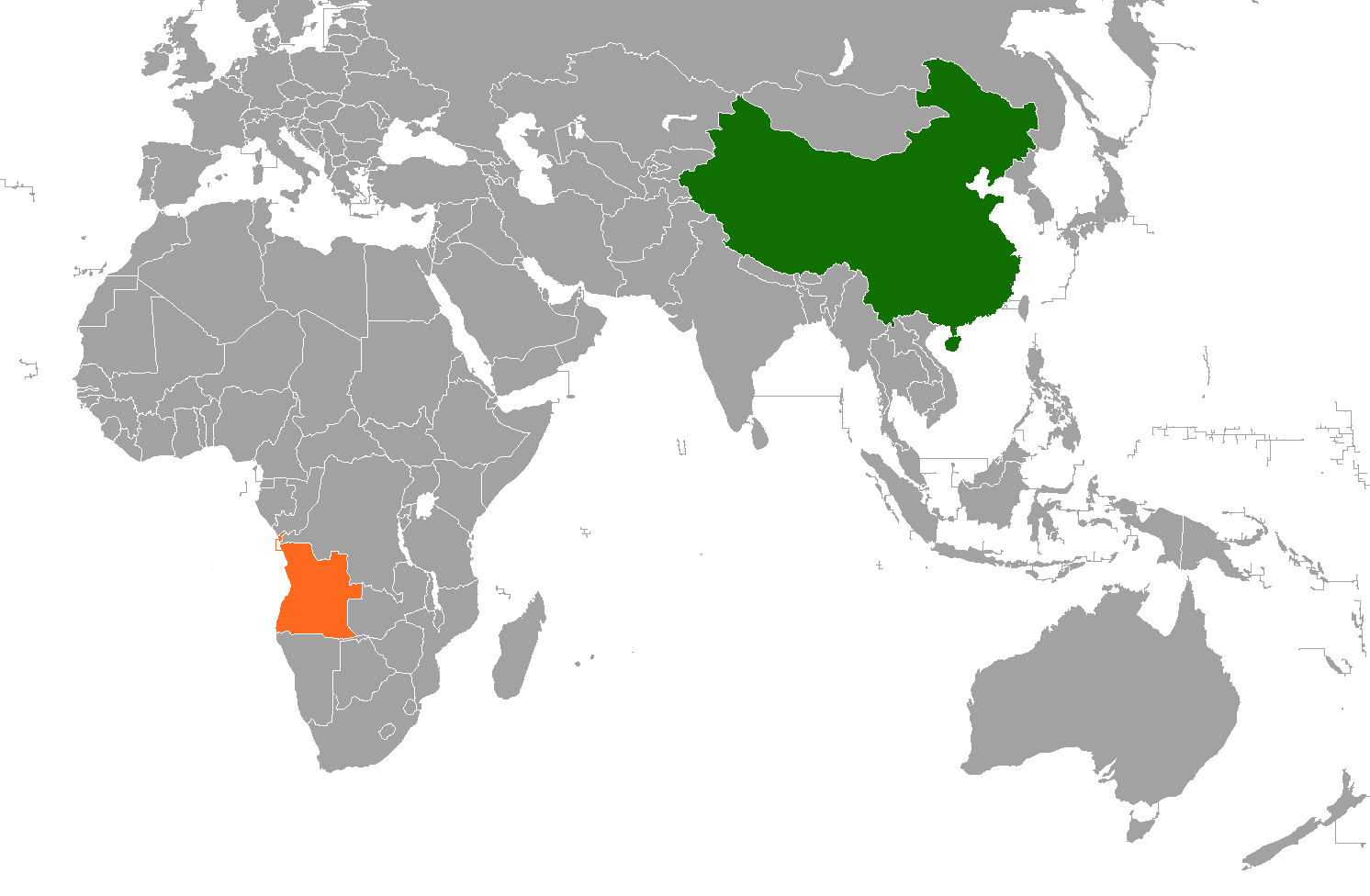
- China: Angola

Relations between Angola and China predate the former's independence. Today, they are based on an emerging trade relationship. As of 2021, Angola was China's third-largest trading partner in Africa. The two countries announced a comprehensive strategic partnership in 2024.

== History ==
During Kenya's independence ceremonies in 1963, Foreign Minister of the People's Republic of China Chen Yi told Jonas Savimbi, the Secretary-General of the Union of Peoples of Northern Angola, that his country would give the UPNA (a founding group of the FNLA) "large-scale military aid". Three years later, UNITA separatists formerly part of the FNLA, led by Savimbi, attacked Portuguese workers in Cassamba. Armed with only ten NATO 7.62 rifles, purchased with Chinese aid, the attack failed to stop timber operations and Portuguese colonial authorities killed several UNITA members.

During Angola's war of independence against Portugal during the 1960s and 1970s, China provided assistance to Angola's nationalist movements. China initially backed the MPLA, but later began to support FNLA and UNITA as well. As China's relationship with the Soviet Union soured, the MPLA's relationship with the Soviet Union strengthened, and China pulled its support. In 1974, China provided weapons and instructors to the FNLA, as well as arms to UNITA. After the Carnation Revolution in Portugal that effectively ended the colonizer's influence in Angola, China warned all of Angola's three liberation movements "against meddling by external forces." When Angola descended into civil war in 1975, China continued to back the FNLA and UNITA, but drew back as the MPLA gained power.

On its 2017 medical mission to Africa, the People's Liberation Army Navy hospital ship Peace Ark traveled to Angola.

== Political ties ==
Following Angola's independence, China struggled to normalize relations with the new MPLA government throughout the 1970s, as tensions with the Soviet Union (who backed the MPLA) remained high. In 1982, however, the People's Republic of China announced its support of, and desire to normalize relations with, Angola's government. The Angolan People's Republic established relations with the People's Republic of China on January 12, 1983.

In 2010, Angola and China signed a strategic partnership.

On March 15, 2024, Angola and China upgraded their bilateral relationship to a comprehensive strategic partnership.

China has an extradition treaty with Angola.

Angola follows the one China principle. It recognizes the People's Republic of China as the sole government of China and the Taiwan Area as an integral part of China's territory as it does not recognize the legitimacy of the Republic of China, and supports all efforts by the PRC to "achieve national reunification". It also considers Hong Kong, Xinjiang and Tibet to be China's internal affairs.

=== Bilateral visits ===
Chinese Prime Minister Wen Jiabao visited Angola in June 2006, offering a US$9 billion loan for infrastructure improvements in return for petroleum. The PRC has invested heavily in Angola since the end of the civil war in 2002.

Dalva Ringote, the current ambassador of Angola to China, visited the PRC in November 2007.

In March 2024, Angolan President João Lourenço visited China. During the visit, the two countries announced the upgrading of bilateral relations to a comprehensive strategic partnership.

=== Fissures ===
On December 3, 1975, a meeting occurred between U.S. and Chinese officials, including Vice-Premier Deng Xiaoping, Foreign Minister Qiao Guanhua, President Gerald Ford, Secretary of State Henry Kissinger, National Security Advisor Brent Scowcroft and head of the U.S. Liaison Office in Peking George H. W. Bush. Discussions entailed who should support FNLA or UNITA, by which means and in what manner, considering the sensitivities of neighboring countries such as Zaire and South Africa. China still supported the FNLA and UNITA against the MPLA. Chinese officials asked about the United States' continued participation in Angola via South Africa, which resulted in Kissinger responding that the US is prepared to "push out South Africa as soon as an alternative military force can be created". Ford then said: "We had nothing to do with the South African involvement and we will take action to get South Africa out, provided a balance can be maintained for their not being in." He also said that he had approved US$35 million more in support of the north above what had been done before.

President of Angola Agostinho Neto condemned the Chinese invasion of Vietnam in February 1979.

On August 25, 2012, 37 Chinese nationals, arrested in Angola due to their alleged involvement in criminal acts against fellow Chinese expatriates, were extradited and due to be tried in China.

== Economic relations ==
The Angolan People's Republic first established formal trade relations with China in June 1984. This was followed by aid packages to Angola in 1984 and 1985, including a donation from China of equipment for Angola's ports.

Angola and China both participate in the multi-lateral group Forum Macao, which China formed in 2003 to increase economic and commercial cooperation between China and the Portuguese-speaking countries.

As China began a new town construction boom around 2010, the Chinese government and state-owned enterprises began developing new towns with African governments, including Angola. Angola's Quilamba city (developed by CITIC Group) is the largest development of this kind.

Angola joined the Belt and Road Initiative (BRI) in 2018.

=== Trade and investment ===
As of 2007, Angola was China's biggest trading partner in Africa. Trade between the two countries was worth US$24.8 billion in 2010.

Since then, Angola's trading power with China has waned. In 2011 and in the first 8 months of 2012 Angola was the second largest trading partner of China in Africa, after South Africa. In 2016, the worth of trade between the two countries had declined to US$15.6 billion; Chinese exports to Angola amounted to US$1.68 billion and Angolan exports to China amounted to US$13.97 billion. Angola is now China's third-largest trading partner in Africa.

In 2009, Chinese private investment in Angola reached over US$166 million.

Publishing in 2019, academic Carlos Oya writes that Chinese companies in Angola have a high degree of localization, including through the training and hiring of local workers.

=== Chinese development finance to Angola ===
Angola first sought development money from China after the Angolan Civil War had come to an end. Angola had previously sought International Monetary Fund (IMF) for assistance in 2001, but was unwilling to accept the conditions placed on the aid money by the IMF. Likewise, Angola would not accept the conditions of Paris Club funding. The Angolan government also declined to allow importation of genetically modified agricultural products, which further stalled aid from international organizations.

According to Schmitz, for most observers of Chinese engagement with Angola, 2002 marks a critical turning point. The year 2002, end of Angola's civil war, coincided with China's "going global" strategy, initiated in 1999 with the goal of internationalizing Chinese firms.

Beginning in 2002, China built infrastructure including roads and hospitals in Angola in exchange for reduced-price oil, and exchange which benefitted both countries.

From first Forum on China Africa Cooperation conference in 2000 to 2013, Beijing has completed $465 million of official development finance projects in Angola (financial amounts normalized in 2009 dollars). This includes a $90 million loan from the Exim Bank of China for the rehabilitation of the Luanda railway and the construction of a 45 km electricity distribution line between Quifangondo and Mabubas. Angola has also received a $1 billion oil-backed line of credit for the China Exim bank to repair the country's infrastructure.

Exim Bank was willing to offer loans in U.S. dollars.

Between 2000 and 2014, China loaned US$21.2 billion to Angola, mostly in the form of resource-backed loans. These exchanges of infrastructure for resources have helped enhance the fiscal capacity of Angola's government. Another estimate states that the amount of Chinese investment in Angola tallied US$24.7 billion from 2005 to 2020.

During the COVID-19 pandemic, Chinese creditors provided Angola with a three-year moratorium on its loan payments. Payments resumed during an economic slowdown in Angola. In 2024, state-owned China Development Bank agreed to release US$1.5 billion in loan collateral deposited by Angola back to Angola, for the country to use in making its loan payments.

Academic Deborah Brautigam writes that the model of China's aid to Angola is an improvement to the general international aid regime, because China's model of infrastructure-for-resources indirectly guarantees that resources result in public benefits, instead of being siphoned off for the benefit of elites.

=== Oil industry and infrastructure ===
Since the early 2000s, Angola has consistently remained a key producer of oil for China. In 2006, Angola briefly became China's top supplier of oil, surpassing Saudi Arabia. As of 2020, Angola is the fifth-largest provider of oil imports to China.

As part of its financial lending to Angola, China has provided oil-backed loans to the country, which are guaranteed to be repaid by the proceeds of Angola's oil sales from its state-owned oil company, Sonangol. These loans were primarily used for infrastructure development in Angola, with one agreement stipulating that 70% of the services used to build the infrastructure had to be contracted from China. As of 2010, over four hundred state and private Chinese companies were operating in Angola. This practice has been criticized by scholars as being "neo-imperial" in nature, or a new economic form of colonialism.

These infrastructure projects funded by Chinese oil-backed loans triggered investment and growth in some domestic sectors of Angola's economy. As the domestic market grew during the 2010s, Angola's government moved to protect its local agricultural and food and beverage production industries in order to further enhance economic growth at home.

With the ascension of João Lourenço as president of Angola, relations have cooled. Lourenco promised to diversify his country's economy and reduce its dependence on China.

== Chinese diaspora in Angola ==
As of 2016, an estimated 53,000 Chinese citizens were living and working in Angola; other estimates fall in the range of 100,000 to 250,000 people. The estimated population peaked at around 300,000. At the end of 2019, the number of Chinese workers in Angola was down to 22,868; it is theorized that this number fluctuates based on changes in commodity prices. Angolan public opinion on China, as gleaned from an analysis of internet commentary in the early 2010s, is reportedly mixed. One study theorizes that singular negative incidents, however minor, have sometimes propagated negative stereotypes towards Chinese migrants living in Angola, particularly in regards to China becoming a neo-colonial power in Angola.

Following the July 2025 Angolan protests, dozens of Chinese-owned retail shops were looted and thousands of Chinese nationals fled the country.

== See also ==
- Africa–China relations
- Angolan Civil War

== Bibliography ==
- Cardenal, Juan Pablo; Araújo, Heriberto (2011). La silenciosa conquista china (in Spanish). Barcelona: Crítica. pp. 144–152. ISBN 9788498922578.
