= China–Madagascar relations =

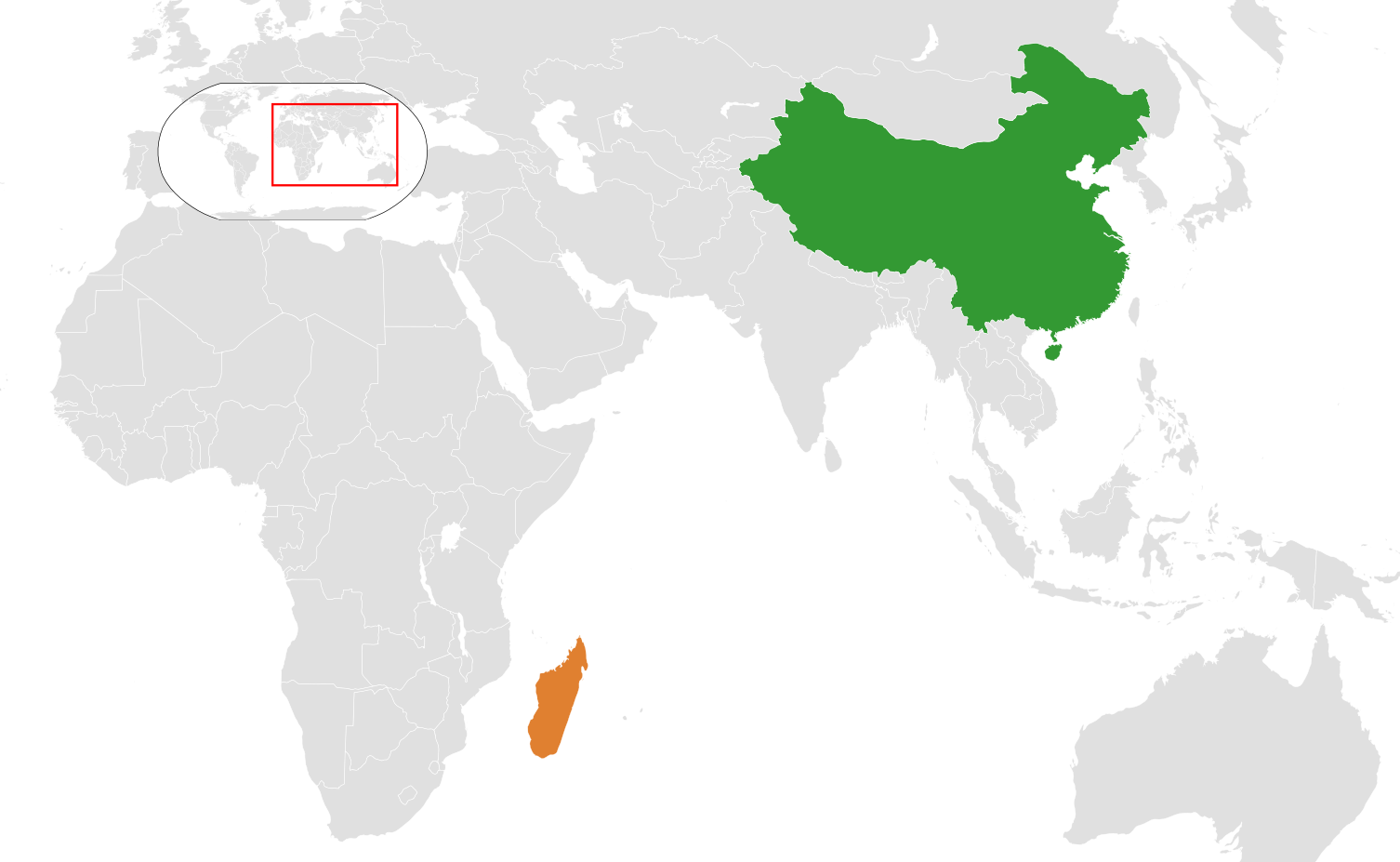
- China: Madagascar

The People's Republic of China and Madagascar established diplomatic relations in November 1972. The two countries established a comprehensive strategic partnership in 2017.

== Diplomatic relations ==
The People's Republic of China and Madagascar established diplomatic ties on 6 November 1972. The two governments signed a trade agreement in January 1974, a trade, economic and technical cooperation agreement in June 1995, an agreement on the establishment of a mixed commission for economic and commercial cooperation and an agreement on bilateral investment promotion and protection in November 2005.

In 2017, Madagascar joined the Belt and Road Initiative (BRI) and the two countries established a comprehensive cooperation partnership. Madagascar was among the first African countries to sign a cooperation document on BRI with China.

In January 2019, He Wei, special envoy of Chinese leader, CCP general secretary Xi Jinping and vice chairman of the National Committee of CPPCC, visited Madagascar and attended the inauguration ceremony of newly elected President Andry Rajoelina. In November 2019, Chinese Vice Premier Sun Chunlan visited Madagascar, met with President Rajoelina and Prime Minister Christian Ntsay, and visited the Chinese Medical Mission to Madagascar.

== Economic relations ==
According to the Malagasy customs, China has been Madagascar's biggest trading partner and biggest source of import since 2015. In 2020, the bilateral trade in goods reached US$930 million, accounting for 18.1% of Madagascar's total foreign trade.

According to China's Ministry of Commerce, the flow of China's direct investment to Madagascar was US$136 million in 2020 and the stock of investment has reached US$391 million at the end of 2020. The Chinese enterprises in Madagascar have carried out corporate social responsibility (CSR) activities, contributing to the country's economic, social development and improving people's livelihood.

=== Development cooperation ===
Since the establishment of diplomatic relations in 1972, China has assisted Madagascar in a number of economic and social projects, including the construction of a Primary School for China-Africa Friendship, the construction of and technical support to the Sports and Cultural Palace, the International Conference Center at Ivato, and the Anosiala Hospital. In 1975, China agreed to provide Madagascar with aid for the development of the Moramanga-Andranonampango Highway. The highway was funded with an interest-free loan from China and was completed in 1985.

In recent years, China has continued supporting the Chinese medical mission and technical experts to Madagascar, deepened human resources development cooperation, and carried out a series of infrastructure and social projects, such as the expressway between Ivato Airport and the Boulevard de l'Europe, the Tsarasaotra-Ivato expressway, the "Eggs Road", well-drilling, etc. The assistance and cooperation have contributed to the socio-economic recovery of Madagascar and brought tangible benefits to the Malagasy people.

In early 2019, the newly inaugurated President Rajoelina inspected the 200 well-drilling project in the south, and attended the inauguration ceremonies of the extension and renovation project of the expressway linking Port Toamasina and the RN2 and the rehabilitation project of the RN5A in the north.

From 2000 to 2011, there were approximately 19 Chinese official development finance projects identified in Madagascar through various media reports. These projects range from developing a new 40.5 MW hydroelectric plant in the Betsiboka River basin with a loan from the Chinese Export Import Bank, to the construction of an international conference center in Antananarivo.

== Political relations ==
Madagascar follows the one China principle. It recognizes the People's Republic of China as the sole government of China and Taiwan as an integral part of China's territory, and supports all efforts by the PRC to "achieve national reunification". It also considers Hong Kong, Xinjiang and Tibet to be China's internal affairs.

== Resident diplomatic missions ==
- China has an embassy in Antananarivo.
- Madagascar has an embassy in Beijing.
