= China–Colombia relations =

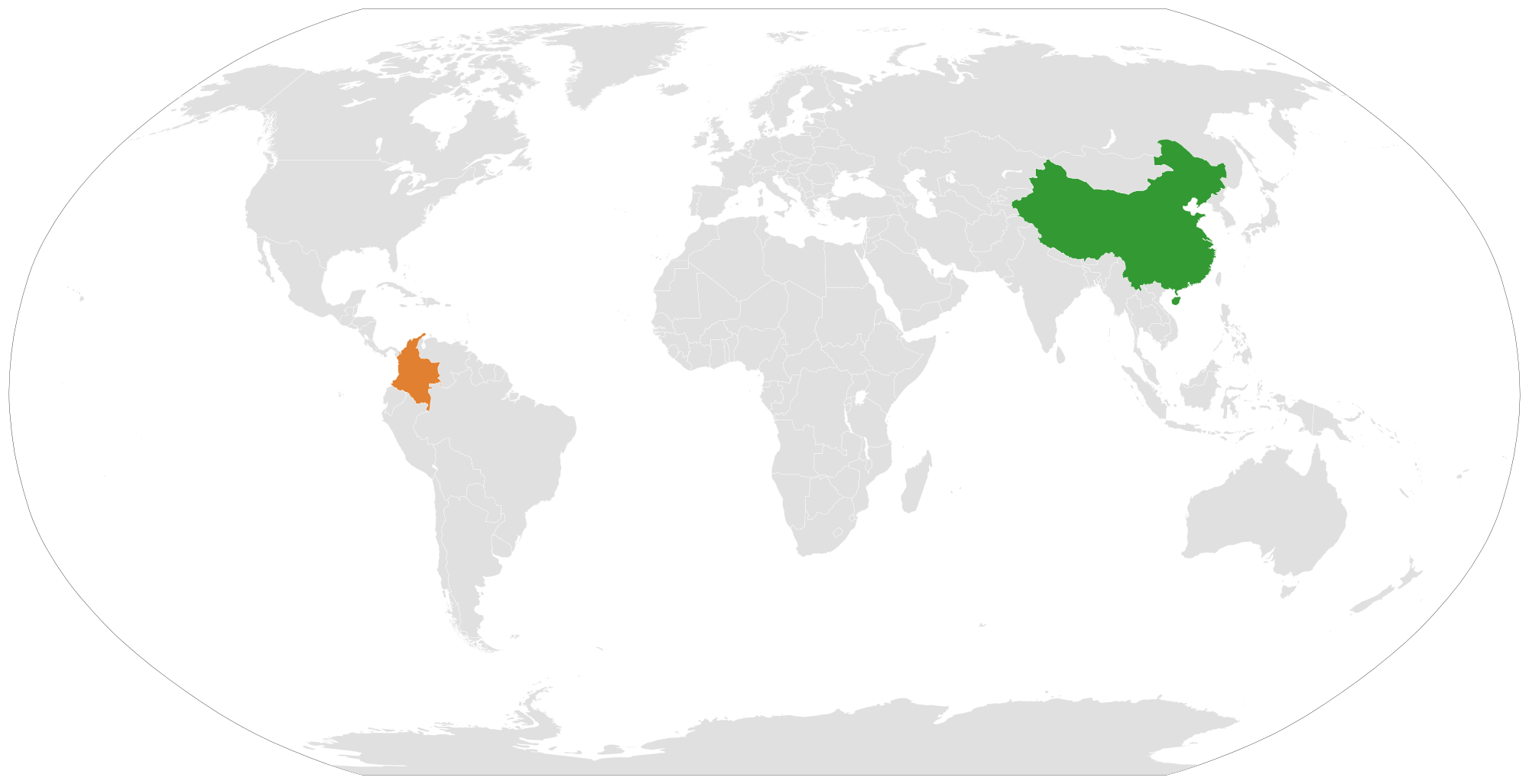
- China: Colombia

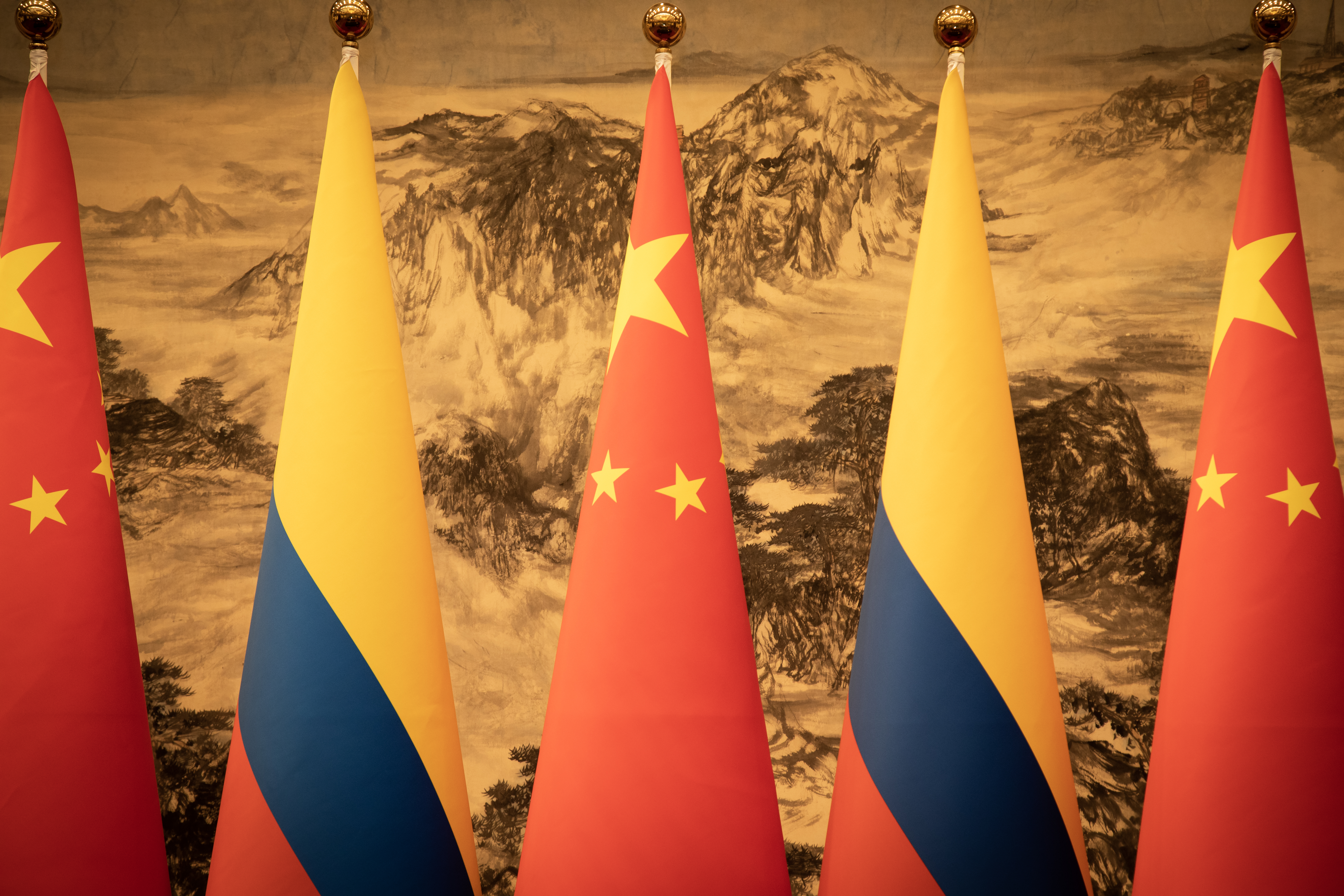
The flags of China and Colombia in Beijing (2023)

The People's Republic of China and the Republic of Colombia established diplomatic relations in 1980. Both nations are members of the Group of 77 and the United Nations. The two countries formed a strategic partnership in 2023. In May 2025, Colombia joined China's Belt and Road Initiative.

== History ==
Early contact between the people of modern-day Colombia and China dates back to the early days of the Spanish Colonial Empire in the Americas and the Philippines. In the 16th-17th century, people, goods, and news traveling between China and Spain usually did so through the Philippines, where there was a large Chinese diaspora, and via the Manila galleon trade to Mexico. From there, many goods and services were continued onwards to Lima, Peru and would make stop-overs in modern-day Colombia.

After World War II, Colombia established diplomatic relations with the Republic of China (Taiwan) in 1949. During the Korean War, Colombia and the People's Republic of China (PRC) fought on opposite sides. The Colombian Battalion under the United Nations Command fought the PRC's People's Volunteer Army in multiple battles, notably the Battle of Old Baldy.

In September 1977, a group of Colombians of all political and ideological tendencies and of all social origins; organized themselves into the Colombia-China Friendship Association, which began to act under the premises established by their Chinese counterpart and which sought to support the cause of the establishment of relations between the PRC and Colombia based on the One-China policy, and to expand the space of cultural and historical recognition regardless of political or ideological affiliation.

On 7 February 1980, Colombia established diplomatic relations with the PRC and broke diplomatic relations with Taiwan per the One-China policy. Since the establishment of diplomatic relations, high-level meetings have been held and a friendly relationship has been strengthened in various areas such as multilateral, technical, educational, cultural, military, economic and commercial cooperation, among others.

In 1985, Chinese Premier Zhao Ziyang paid a visit to Colombia, becoming the first Chinese head-of-government to visit the nation. During his visit, Premier Zhao met with Colombian President Belisario Betancur. In 1996, Colombian President Ernesto Samper Pizano paid a visit to China, becoming the first Colombian President to visit China. From the initial visits, there would be several high-level visits between leaders of both nations.

China is Colombia's second-largest trading partner globally (after the United States). In 2020, both nations celebrated 40 years of diplomatic relations.

On October 25, 2023, the two countries elevated their bilateral diplomatic status to a strategic partnership.

On 14 May 2025, Colombia officially joined China's Belt and Road Initiative with the signing of an agreement in Beijing.

== High-level visits ==
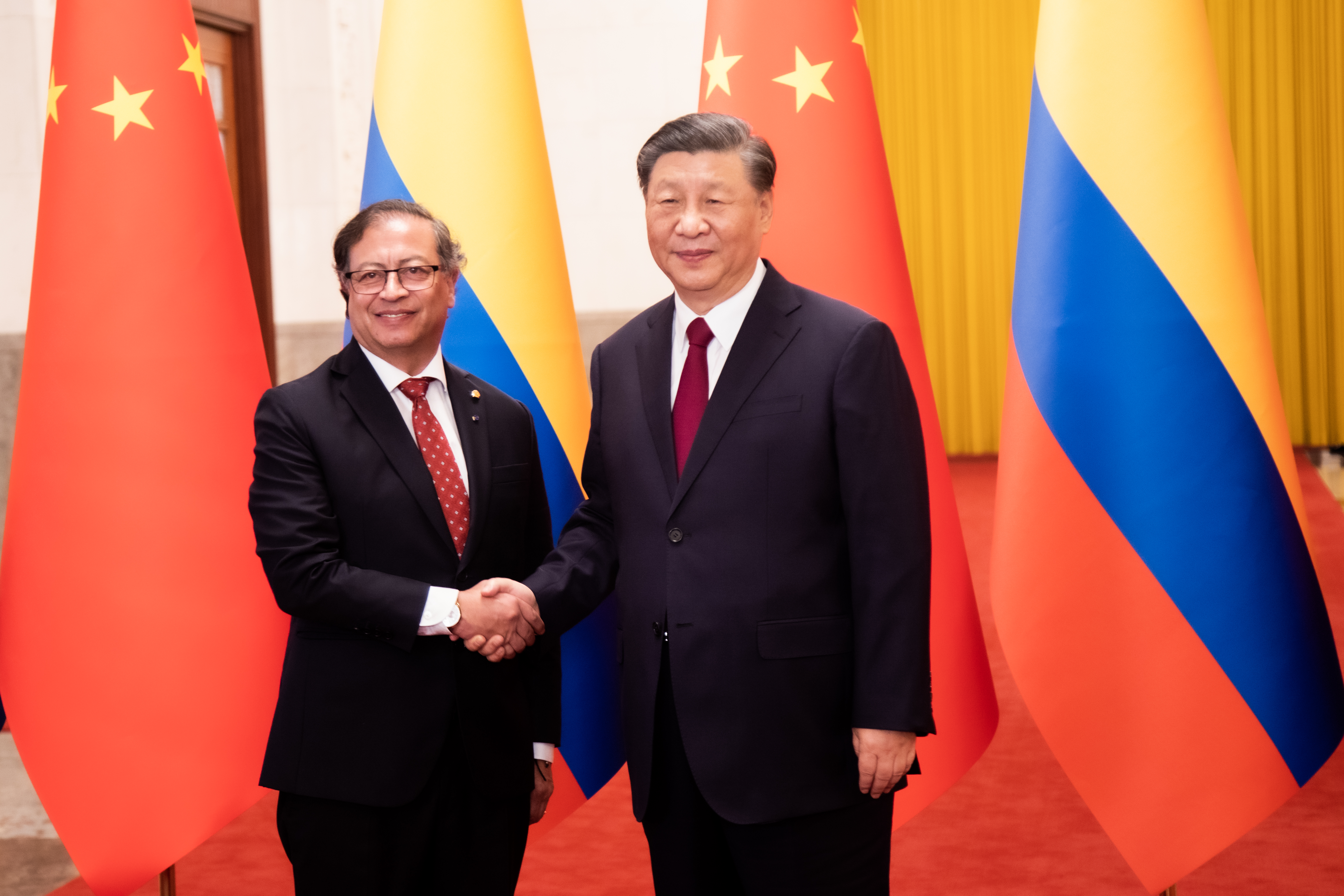
President of Colombia Gustavo Petro meeting with President of China Xi Jinping in Beijing (25 October 2023)

High-level visits from China to Colombia

- Premier Zhao Ziyang (1985)
- Vice-president Xi Jinping (2009)

High-level visits from Colombia to China

- President Ernesto Samper (1996)
- President Andrés Pastrana Arango (1999)
- President Álvaro Uribe (2005)
- Vice-president Francisco Santos Calderón (2006)
- President Juan Manuel Santos (2012)
- President Iván Duque Márquez (2019)
- President Gustavo Petro (2023)

== Bilateral agreements ==
Both nations have signed several bilateral agreements such as a Trade Agreement (1981); Agreement on Scientific and Technical Cooperation (1981); Agreement on the project Plan for Prevention and Protection against Forest Fires in Colombia (1997); Memorandum of Understanding of Cooperation in the Fight Against Illicit Trafficking of Narcotics and Psychotropic Substances and Related Crimes (1998); Treaty on Judicial Assistance in Criminal Matters (1999); Agreement on Economic and Technical Cooperation (2007); Agreement for the Promotion and Protection of Investments (2008); Agreement on the Prevention of Theft, Clandestine Excavation and Illicit Import and Export of Cultural Goods (2012); and a Treaty on the Transfer of Sentenced Persons (2019).

When Colombia and China upgraded their diplomatic status to a strategic partnership in October 2023 during President Petro's visit to China, the countries signed twelve cooperation agreements.

== Public opinion ==
A survey published in 2026 by the Pew Research Center found that 63% of Colombians had a favorable view of China, while 23% had an unfavorable view. It also found that 73% of Colombians in the 18-35 age group had positive opinions of China.

== Resident diplomatic missions ==
of China in Colombia

- Bogotá (Embassy)

of Colombia in China

- Beijing (Embassy)
- Guangzhou (Consulate-General)
- Hong Kong (Consulate-General)
- Shanghai (Consulate-General)

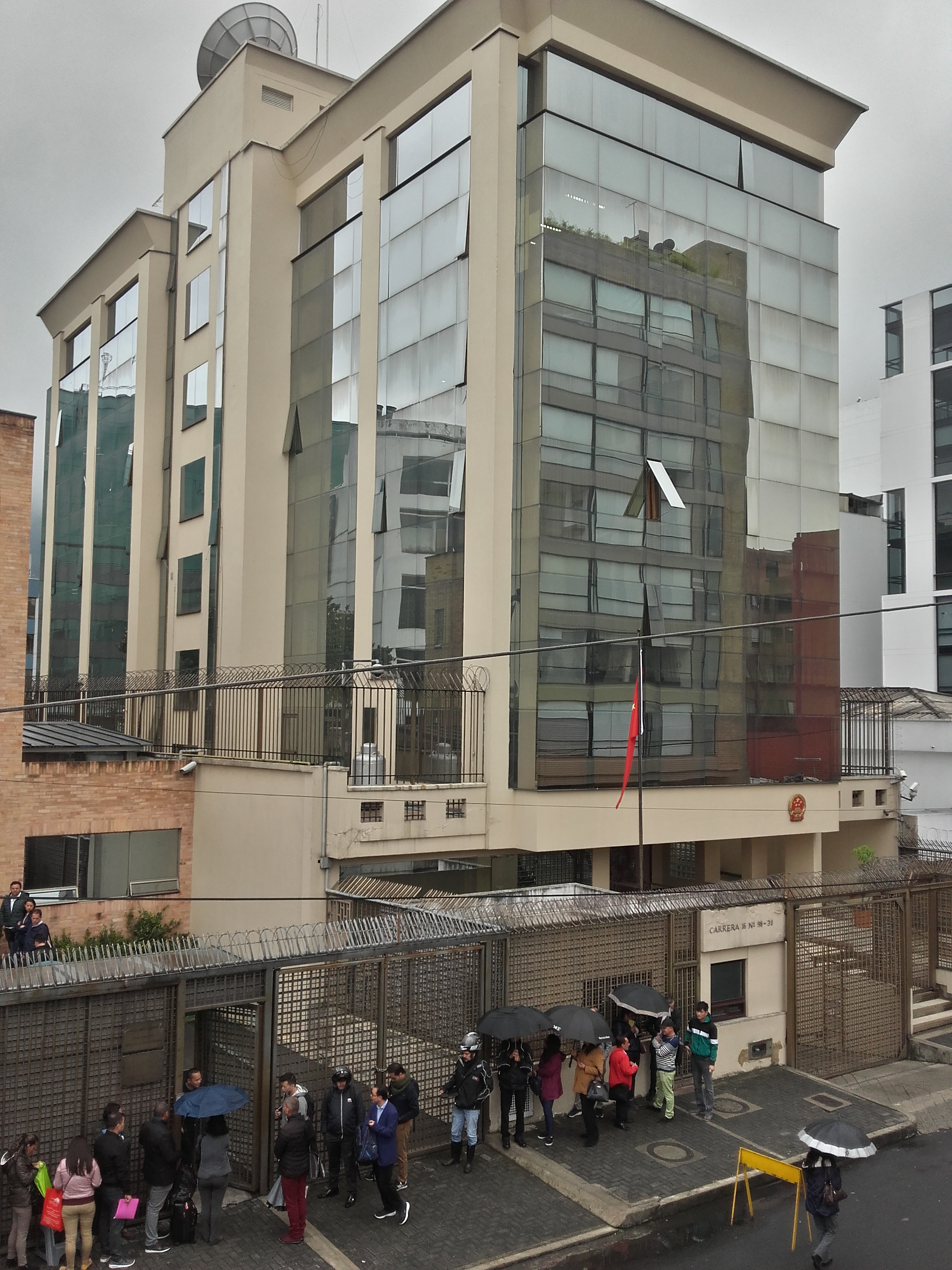
Embassy of China in Bogotá

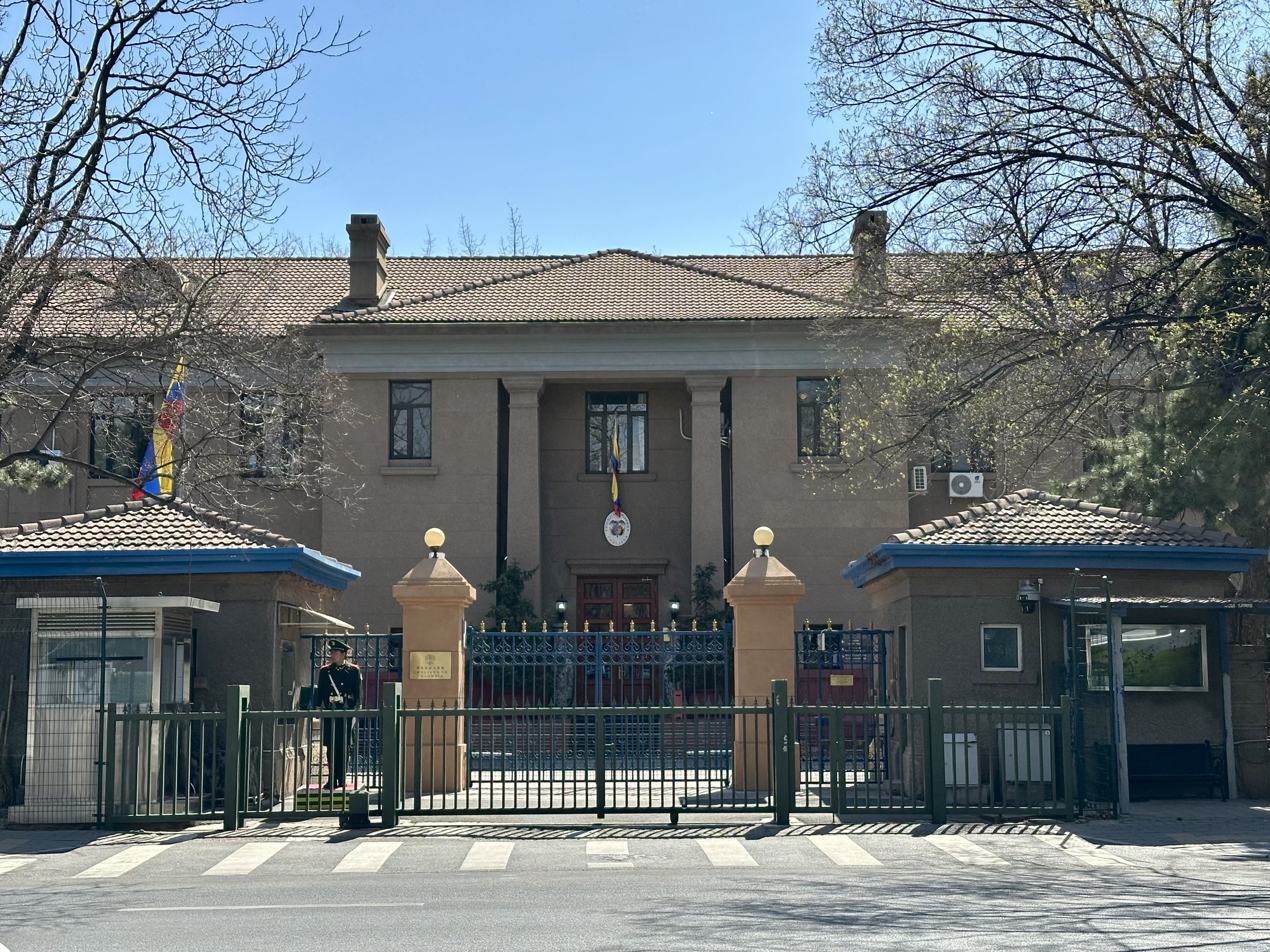
Embassy of Colombia in Beijing

== See also ==
- Asian Colombians
- Immigration to China
