= Constructive Strategic and Stable Relationship =

Political concept in China–United States relations

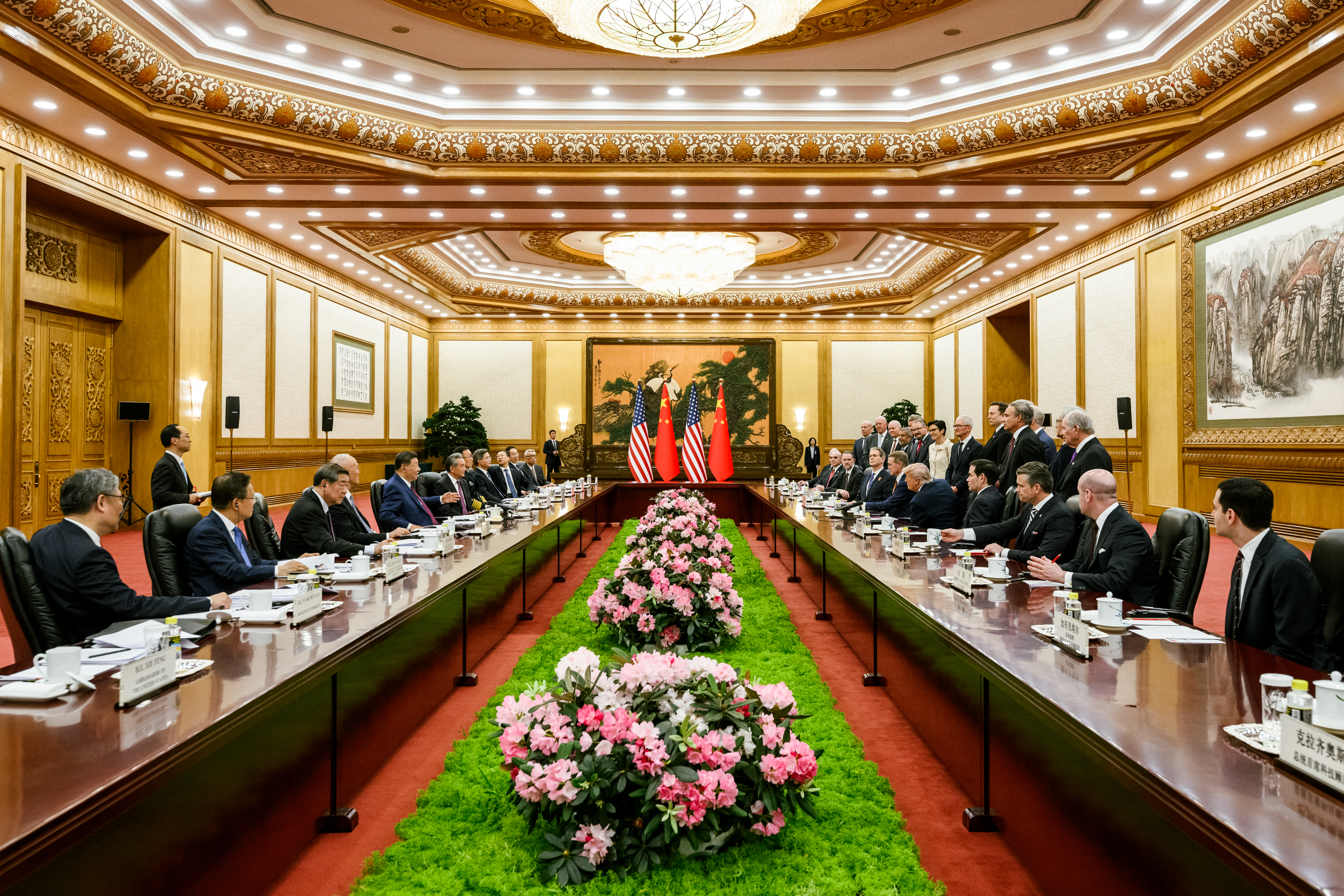
During U.S. President Donald Trump's 2026 visit to China, he and Chinese leader Xi Jinping agreed to establish a Constructive Strategic and Stable Relationship between China and the United States.

Constructive Strategic and Stable Relationship or Constructive Relationship of Strategic Stability (Chinese: 建设性战略稳定关系) is a diplomatic concept describing a proposed framework for relations between China and the United States. It was introduced by CCP General Secretary Xi Jinping and U.S. President Donald Trump when they met in Beijing on 14 May 2026, during Trump's state visit to China.
