= Ethnic Chinese in Mozambique =

Total population
- Various estimates: 10,000 to 40,000

Regions with significant populations
- Maputo; many former residents in Portugal and Macau

Languages
- Portuguese, Chinese (largely Taishan dialect; new expatriates speak Mandarin), Macanese

Related ethnic groups
- Overseas Chinese, Macanese people

Ethnic Chinese in Mozambique once numbered around five thousand individuals, but their population fell significantly during the Mozambican Civil War. After the return of peace and the expansion of Sino-Mozambican economic cooperation, their numbers have been bolstered by new expatriates from the People's Republic of China. While many ethnic Chinese have come for construction and resource extraction jobs, many have also come to engage in the cultural scene of major cities by establishing restaurants and stores that sell Chinese or Chinese-inspired products/services. Although some economic tensions exist between locals and Chinese migrants, perceptions between the two groups are generally positive.

== History ==
=== Origins ===
Chinese people began to settle in the land that makes up the modern state of Mozambique as early as the 1870s, when Portuguese influence in East Africa was growing stronger. Portuguese colonialists recruited Chinese carpenters and unskilled labourers in Macao, then also part of the Portuguese Empire, as well as the neighboring Siyi region of Guangdong, for work on railway construction. Some may not have been voluntary migrants, but criminals sentenced to penal transportation rather than jail. In 1893, the Chinese community in Lourenço Marques (modern-day Maputo) numbered 52 people. One of the more famous of the early migrants was Ja Assam (谢三), a carpenter and architect who funded the construction of Maputo's first Chinese pagoda.

Over time, Chinese people became skilled workers that were useful for the Portuguese colonial project in Mozambique. Specifically, they were often provided labor that was similar to that which could be provided by Portuguese settlers. As few white Portuguese were encouraged to move to Mozambique, and as native Mozambicans did not possess the desired technical skills, Chinese, Indian, and Mulatto migrants provided much of the needed technical labor. They were often paid as much as white Portuguese for this labor, an amount that was significantly greater than that which was paid to native Mozambicans.

Migration of all Asians was officially halted in 1899 due to an outbreak of plague, blamed on Indians; even after the relaxation of the restriction in 1907, Asians who sought to migrate to the colony had to pay a disembarkation fee of 3,000 reals at their port of arrival. Nevertheless, Chinese population continued to grow, to 287 by 1903. By 1928, there were 314 Chinese in Lourenço Marques alone, rising to 483 by 1935 and 570 by 1940. The vast majority started out in the carpentry trade, but soon moved into shopkeeping. These initial ethnic Chinese in Mozambique were known as "good Portuguese" within the colonial Portuguese structure on account of their useful skills, their links to anti-communist Chinese Nationalism, and their deep roots in Mozambique by the 1950s (when many of the original immigrants' children were becoming economically productive members of Mozambican society). The acceptance of ethnic Chinese into Portuguese colonial society during this time epitomized itself in the narrativization and laudation by local newspapers of various cultural and economic activities by ethnic Chinese. In 1961, during the beginning of the Angolan War of Independence, ethnic Chinese expressed their solidarity with the Portuguese colonial system by collecting funds to support the repression of rebel groups in Angola. By the early 1970s, the eve of independence, there were 5,000 Chinese in Mozambique, with 2,000 in Lourenço Marques and another 3,000 in Beira. Mozambique’s struggle for national independence from colonialism and imperialism as well as the FRELIMO party were both supported by the People's Republic of China during the 1960s-70s, and the Chinese government was the first to recognize Mozambique as state, recognizing it on its Independence day, June 25, 1975.

=== Post-independence ===
After Mozambique achieved independence in 1975, the Chinese found their business assets and even the buildings held by the Chinese community associations expropriated by the new Communist government, leading many to consider leaving the country. On July 2, 1975, the People's Republic of China and Mozambique signed an Economic and Technical Cooperation Agreement, encompassing a wide range of areas including political-diplomatic, socio-economic, and cultural matters. On that same day, China also inaugurated its diplomatic embassy in Maputo. In spite of official Chinese government activity in Mozambique increasing, the push to depart was sharpened by the 1977 onset of the Mozambican Civil War. Many emigrated to Portugal. Their arrival preceded that of the main wave of Chinese migration there, consisting of mainland Chinese laborers; the Chinese from Mozambique tended to have far better labor market outcomes in Portugal, due to both their fluent command of Portuguese, and their higher level of education. They commonly found employment as bank tellers, engineers, doctors, and other professionals. Others went to Macau, which remained a Portuguese colony. By the end of the war in 1992, the community had shrunk to a mere several hundred. The descendants of the old Chinese settlers continued to leave the country even with the onset of peace; by 2006, barely twenty families totaling perhaps a hundred people remained in Maputo, while in Beira just two people remained. However, they were replaced by new expatriates from the People's Republic of China, who came to the country as part of the increasing Sino-African economic cooperation. Significantly, Sino-Mozambican relations trace back to the 1960s, when China provided military and financial assistance to Mozambican liberation movements, including the Frelimo party. During the 1980s, a gradual trade and aid relationship began to take shape, continued through the 1990s, and later expanded considerably in the 21st century through a series of economic agreements and during the 2006 Beijing summit.

=== Modern Ethnic Chinese ===
In recent years, many more ethnic Chinese have moved to Mozambique. Most of these migrants self-identify as temporary workers. Most ethnic Chinese in Mozambique today work and live indefinitely. Most of these ethnic Chinese never fully immigrate to Mozambique and become permanent residents on account of a complicated and expensive immigration process which is done in Portuguese and on account of a lack of incentive to become permanent residents. The primary reason that modern ethnic Chinese migrate to Mozambique is to seek economic opportunity. Often, Chinese laborers work for Chinese companies funding development projects or extractive projects in the region. Other times, Ethnic Chinese work as entrepreneurs running various independently, small businesses.

Many of the ethnic Chinese that come to Mozambique to establish small businesses come due to a high availability of jobs in Mozambique for ethnic Chinese (there is high demand particularly for Chinese fashion) and due to the better working environment (specifically as regards the pollution of Chinese cities and the lack of safety in many Chinese jobs). Many send extra money made back home to their families in China. Most of these ethnic Chinese never fully immigrate to Mozambique and become permanent residents on account of a complicated and expensive immigration process which is done in Portuguese and on account of a lack of real benefit to permanently migrating. Many send extra money made back home to families in China.

== Present-Day Relations with Locals ==
Among Mozambique's non-government elites, there is a prevailing view that the practices of Chinese enterprises in Mozambique reflect the deep-rooted corruption within their own government. These elites often characterize Chinese firms as operating with rigid structures and high demands. Despite this, some have come to accept China’s expanding influence, adapting to what they see as the new norms for achieving success—by seeking opportunities connected to China. At Mozambique’s leading university, students have begun enrolling in the new Confucius Institute to study Mandarin instead of studying English, believing that fluency in Mandarin will soon be essential for securing the highest-paying jobs in the country.

Ethnic Chinese in Mozambique often work side-by-side with or serving to local Mozambicans. Some negative prejudices against Africans persist across a myriad of ethnic Chinese populations in Mozambique. Specifically, research conducted in Mozambique by Micah D. Peterson around 2017 indicated common prejudices among ethnic Chinese in Mozambique against Africans on account of a perceived lack of education, something that Peterson attributes to a Confucian ethos among ethnic Chinese in Mozambique. Furthermore, Peterson's research suggests that anxieties among a few ethnic Chinese in Mozambique exist around perceptions of Africans as being inclined toward physical violence and theft. Both of these prejudices decrease with increased interactions with locals, and there seems to be little engrained prejudice founded upon race or ethnicity specifically, but rather upon a specific perceived lack of education only.

Most of the interactions between locals and ethnic Chinese, however, consist of positive cultural exchanges. These cultural exchanges often occur through the selling of products or services, with the cultural products (e.g. fashion) often being adapted/changed to some extent to be more palatable/sellable to the other culture. These exchanges create widespread positive perceptions of the other group between ethnic Chinese in Mozambique and Mozambicans themselves. Many ethnic Chinese who come to establish entrepreneurial enterprises see having good relationships with locals (Guanxi) as the main key to their success, especially in the face of expensive regulations and high taxes levied on small, foreign-run businesses. For this reason, despite a severe language barrier (most ethnic Chinese in Mozambique speak only Mandarin while most Mozambicans speak Portuguese), many ethnic Chinese intentionally seek good relations with locals whenever they can. The primary mechanism of doing such is via providing high quality, in-demand products/services. A few scholars in 2020 asserted that the significant efforts that ethnic Chinese living in Mozambique undergo to integrate into the local society in a positive way counter more traditional orientalist narratives of isolated and closed-off Chinese communities across the African continent resisting integration and holding onto traditional ethnocentric ways of living. These ethnic Chinese (temporary or otherwise) act in ways that are mostly indistinguishable from other immigrants in other countries.

=== Economic Tensions (Agriculture, Logging, and Fishing) ===
One significant point of contestation between ethnic Chinese and native Mozambicans has arisen around the use and ownership of land. As land ownership is hard to reliably track in much of Mozambique, rumors began arising in the late 2000s among Mozambicans about Chinese plots (often run by Chinese-state-affiliated companies in affiliation with native Mozambican companies) to settle Chinese farmers on un-farmed Mozambican land. Specifically, the Chinese have historically imported agricultural and fishery products from Mozambique, recently increasing their engagement in logging and in the extractive industries therein. China is committed to transforming Mozambique into one of its main food suppliers, particularly for rice. The specific rumor, then, has emerged that the Chinese government is intent on moving thousands of Chinese settlers into the Zambezi valley. This has caused significant outrage locally, with many fearing the repetition of the dias negros (black days of oppression). Many scholars have investigated these rumors, and although disproving them entirely is difficult due to a lack of clear data, they seem unlikely to be true. Nonetheless, these and similar rumors have undermined to some extent the positive view among many Mozambicans of ethnic Chinese in Mozambique today. Much of this suspicion spreads through civil society and political structures. Notably, fears about Chinese ownership of Mozambican farmland are commonplace within the National Peasants' Union (UNAC).

In the North, illegal logging by Chinese owned companies (among other companies) is broadly unpopular. Ownership and extraction rights are often acquired through corrupt means and threaten the economic prosperity of locals practicing small-scale industry. Tensions over illegal logging contribute negatively but in a limited capacity to decreasing trust of Chinese entrepreneurs among local Mozambicans.

Further tension exists between Chinese and Mozambican workers in the fishing sectors of the economy. Language barriers have contributed to misunderstandings, resentment, and logistical challenges therein, deepening the divide between the two communities. A report by the Environmental Justice Foundation (EJF) documented numerous alleged violations by China’s distant-water fishing fleet between 2017 and 2023, including activities that have accelerated the depletion of fish stocks. Mozambican workers employed under Chinese fishing operations reportedly endured conditions resembling slavery, marked by violence and threats. These abuses have strained relations between Chinese and Mozambican individuals on the ground in that industry.

== Chinese-Funded Projects ==
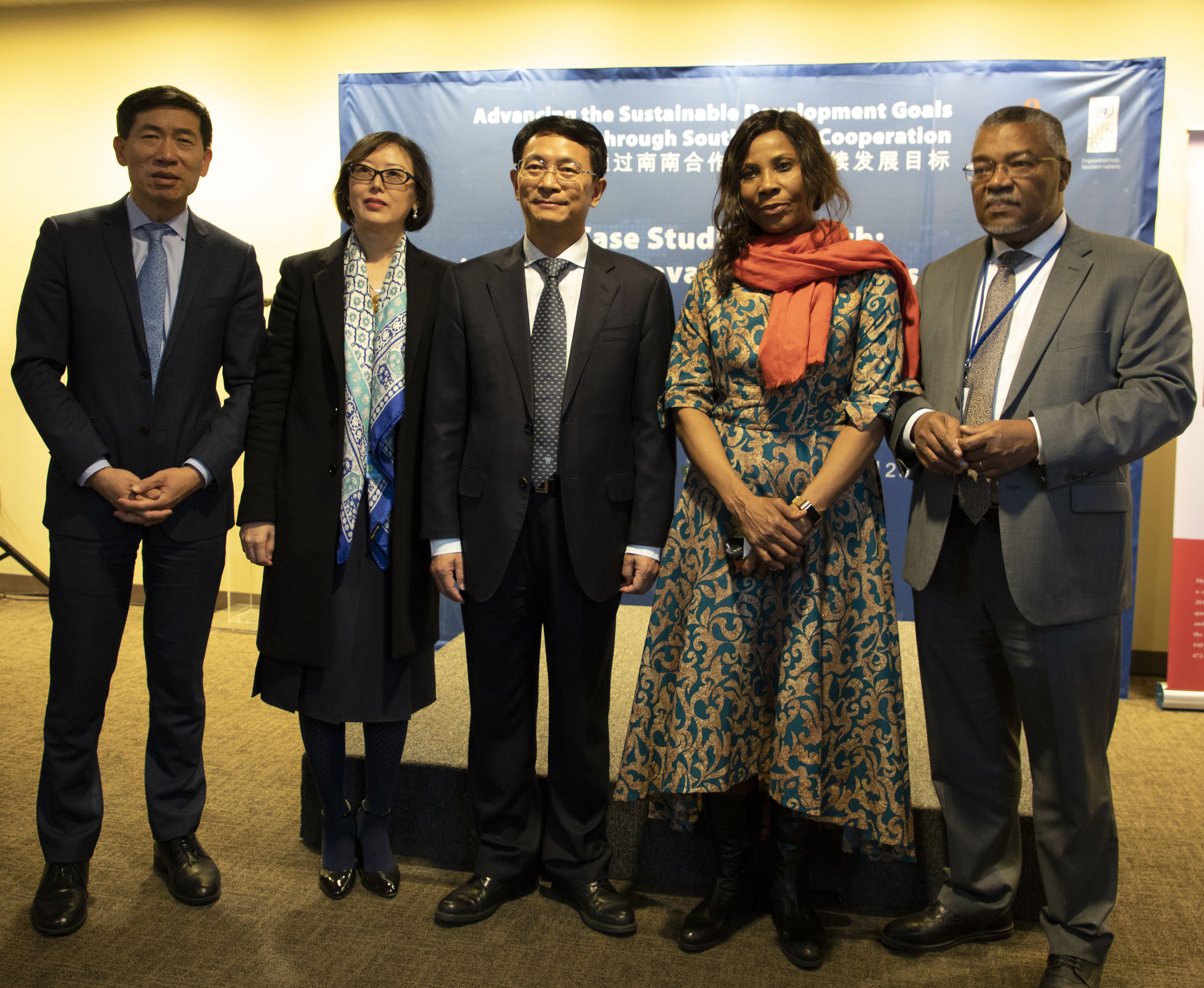
China International Development Cooperation Agency (CIDCA) joined with the Chinese Permanent Mission to the United Nations and the United Nations Development Programme (UNDP) to launch results of China’s partnership with Guinea-Bissau and Mozambique on agriculture development.

Many Chinese-funded projects have emerged in recent years that increase Chinese cultural capital and presence in Mozambique. For more than a decade, China has pursued the construction of stadiums and government buildings. This was followed by a surge in infrastructure development such as roads, airports, and seaports. By 2009, Chinese firms were responsible for roughly one-third of all road construction in the country. More recent projects have focused on paving key transport routes, including the Nacala Corridor in northern Mozambique, which links the port of Nacala with neighboring Malawi and Zambia. A new Confucius Institute is currently under construction at Eduardo Mondlane University, Mozambique’s most prestigious academic institution. This development is part of broader cultural cooperation efforts between Mozambique and China, stemming from agreements signed in 2012, which also led to the creation of the Mozambique-China Cultural Centre with a planned three-year construction timeline. One of the most prominent infrastructure projects—the Maputo-Catembe Bridge—was financed almost entirely by the China Exim Bank and built by the state-owned China Road and Bridge Company. Additional initiatives include the Agricultural Testing and Development Center (ATDC), aimed at enhancing food security and agricultural productivity through the transfer of Chinese expertise and technology across 23 African countries. In the central city of Beira, the Chinese government provided $120 million in concessional aid in 2017 to fully refurbish the Porto de Pesca commercial fishing port. This overhaul doubled its docking capacity and increased fishery production by over 200-fold. Similarly, major upgrades to Maputo International Airport were carried out by the Chinese Anhui Foreign Economic Construction Group (AFECG), which built a new international terminal along with a domestic one. Currently, around 30 Chinese construction companies operate out of Maputo. Many infrastructure projects have been either provided free of charge or funded through soft loans from the Export-Import Bank of China.

== Important Visits from China to Mozambique ==
Li Zhanshu, Chairman of the Standing Committee of the National People's Congress (2018); Xu Qiliang, Vice Chairman of the Central Military Commission and General of the Air Force (2019); Cai Dafeng, Special Envoy of President Xi Jinping and Vice Chairman of the Standing Committee of the National People's Congress (2020); Yang Jiechi, member of the Politburo of the Chinese Communist Party (CCP) and Director of the Office of the Central Foreign Affairs Commission of the CCP (2022); and Losang Jamcan, Vice Chairperson of the Standing Committee of the National People's Congress (2023).

== Important Visits from Mozambique to China ==
President Filipe Jacinto Nyusi (September 2018 to attend FOCAC Beijing Summit, April 2019 to attend the 2nd Belt and Road Forum for International Cooperation and September 2024 to attend the FOCAC Beijing Summit), Prime Minister Adriano Malaiane (in 2019 as Minister of Economy and Finance, October 2023 to attend the 3rd Belt and Road Forum for International Cooperation), vice president of Mozambican Assembly Helder Ernesto Injojo (2023), Secretary-General of the Mozambique Liberation Front (FRELIMO) Roque Silva Samuel (2023), Defense Minister Cristovao Chume (2024).

== Numbers ==
Various sources give different estimates for the size of Mozambique's Chinese community. A 2007 article in the Chinese Academy of Social Sciences journal West Asia And Africa claimed that the number then was just 1,500, with one-third of those in Maputo. In contrast, the local Chinese embassy estimated the number may have been 7,000, and Mozambican immigration officials gave a figure of 12,000. In 2014, a total of 1,668 Chinese were hired to work in the African country, accounting for 9.8 percent of the total foreign workers hired that year. In recent years, the Chinese government has entered into a "Comprehensive Strategic Cooperative Partnership" with Mozambique. This has led to a significant increase in the presence of Chinese investment, both militarily and economic, in Mozambique, which has led to an increase in the number of ethnic Chinese living in Mozambique to anywhere between 10,000 and 40,000 individuals.

== Notable people ==
- Shéu Han, footballer for Benfica and the Portugal national team
- Ricardo Rangel, late photojournalist of Chinese descent
- Kok Nam, photojournalist of Chinese descent
