= China–Gabon relations =

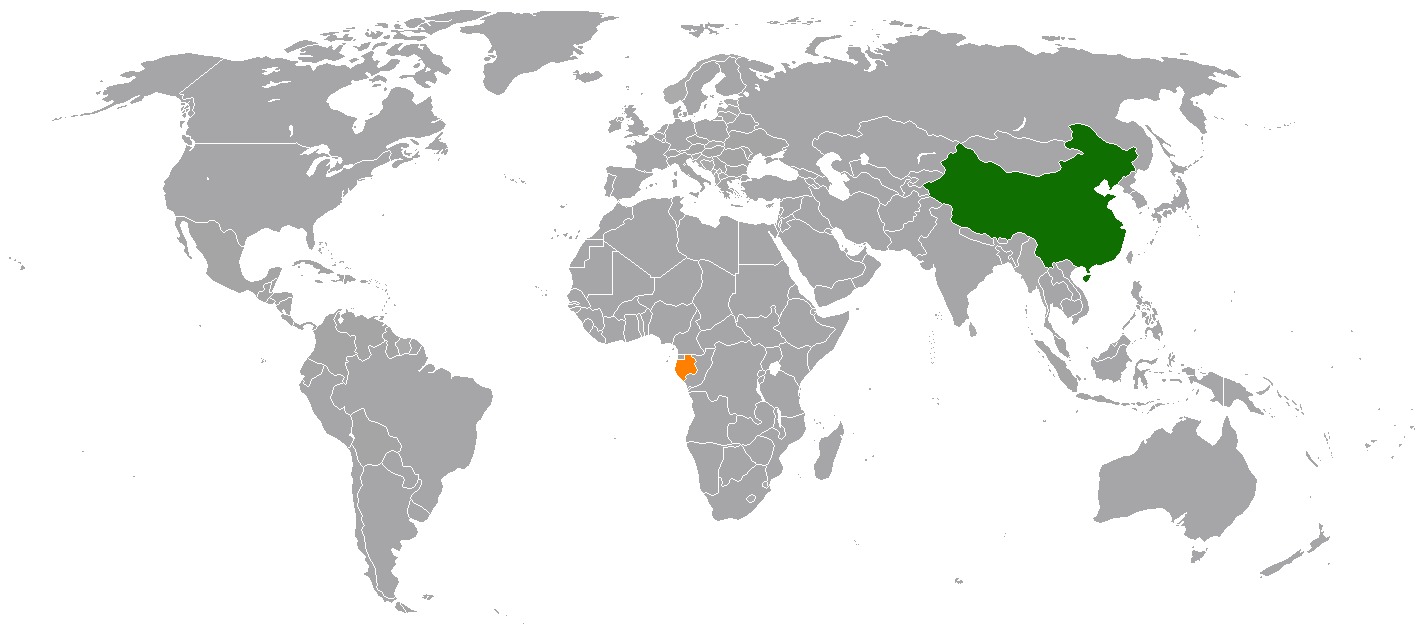
- China: Gabon

Diplomatic mission
- Chinese Embassy, Libreville: Gabonese Embassy, Beijing

China–Gabon relations refer to the foreign relations between China and Gabon. On December 9, 1960, China (as the Republic of China in Taipei) established diplomatic relations with Gabon. Gabon switched recognition to the People's Republic of China in Beijing on April 20, 1974.

Gabon adheres to the One China policy where it recognizes the People's Republic of China as the sole legitimate government of China and does not recognize the legitimacy of the Republic of China.

== History ==
In the early 20th century, Chinese people migrated to Gabon from provinces such as Zhejiang in southeastern China.

On August 17, 1960, when Gabon gained independence, Premier Zhou Enlai of the People's Republic of China sent a congratulatory message. On the same day, Foreign Minister Chen Yi announced that the government of the People's Republic of China recognized the Republic of Gabon. However, Gabon did not immediately establish diplomatic relations with the People's Republic of China. Instead, on December 9, 1960, it established diplomatic relations with the government of the Republic of China, which had retreated to Taiwan. In 1971, at the 26th United Nations General Assembly, Gabon's representatives even opposed the People's Republic of China's joining the United Nations.

Despite this, after 1972, the Gabonese government began to strengthen its diplomatic relations with the government of the People's Republic of China, and finally severed diplomatic relations with the government of the Republic of China on March 30, 1974. On April 20 of the same year, the Chinese government appointed Wang Peng, the ambassador extraordinarily and plenipotentiary to Mauritania, as its plenipotentiary representative to Gabon, and signed a Joint Communique in Libreville with Gabonese government representative and Minister of Foreign Affairs and Cooperation of the Presidential Palace, Dokwatsege, announcing the establishment of diplomatic relations between the two countries. Since then, bilateral relations have developed smoothly and friendly. On June 30, 1974, Dokwatsege led a friendly delegation from the Gabonese Republic to visit China. On October 4, Gabonese President El Hadj Omar Bongo and his wife paid a state visit to China and met with Mao Zedong, Chairman of the Chinese Communist Party. During the visit, the two sides signed the China-Gabon Economic and Technical Cooperation Agreement and the Trade Agreement, and issued a press release. Since then, until his death in 2009, Omar visited the People's Republic of China ten times and attended the Beijing Summit of the Forum on China-Africa Cooperation and the opening ceremony of the Beijing Olympic Games. In February 2004, President Hu Jintao visited Gabon. El Hadj Omar Bongo personally went to the Libreville International Airport to greet him. Hu Jintao thus became the first top leader of the People's Republic of China to visit Gabon. After Omar's death, Hu Jintao also sent a message of condolences to the Gabonese government and appointed Vice Premier Zhang Dejiang as a special envoy to attend Omar's funeral.

After El Hadj Omar Bongo died, his son Ali Bongo Ondimba became the president of Gabon. Like his father, Ali Bongo also attached great importance to developing diplomatic relations with the People's Republic of China. In May 2010, he visited the People's Republic of China for the first time and attended the opening ceremony of the Shanghai World Expo. During the Expo, Gabonese Prime Minister Mba also attended the Gabon National Pavilion Day event at the Shanghai World Expo.

In December 2016, Ali Bongo visited China for the second time, during which China and Gabon agreed to upgrade bilateral relations to a "comprehensive cooperative partnership". In August 2018, Ali Bongo visited China for the third time and attended the Beijing Summit of the Forum on China-Africa Cooperation. In January 2023, the newly appointed Chinese Foreign Minister Qin Gang also visited Gabon. In April 2023, Ali Bongo visited China for the fourth time. During the visit, the two countries issued a joint statement, agreeing to establish a comprehensive strategic partnership between China and Gabon.

== Economic relations ==
Since China and Gabon signed their first economic, technical and trade agreement in 1974, the two countries have successively signed an investment protection agreement in May 1997, a renewed trade agreement in 2006, and an agreement on the avoidance of double taxation and a memorandum of understanding on jointly building the Belt and Road Initiative in September 2018. These agreements have also provided a legal basis for the strengthening of trade relations between the two countries.

Between 2005 and 2014, trade between the China and Gabon grew by 600%. According to statistics from the Gabonese government, China has been Gabon's largest trading partner for several consecutive years since 2013. In 2022, the bilateral trade volume between China and Gabon reached US$4.55 billion, an increase of 50.8% over 2021. Among them, China imported about US$3.97 billion of products from Gabon, mainly including oil, manganese ore, timber, etc., while Gabon imported US$580 million from China, an increase of 34.6% over the same period last year, mainly imported mechanical and electrical products, cement and steel products. 22% of China's manganese ore is imported from Gabon.

In terms of investment, China has become one of Gabon's largest sources of investment, along with France, Morocco and other countries. From 2000 to 2011, there are approximately 25 Chinese official development finance projects identified in Gabon through various media reports. These projects range from extending a concessionary loan of $83.1 million to fund the Grand Poubara Dam in 2008, to the construction of the Stade de l’Amitié, also known as the ‘friendship stadium'. As of the end of 2021, China's direct investment in Gabon reached US$218 million, with investment areas mainly in traditional industries such as oil extraction and manganese ore exploration and development. Chinese companies manage half of Gabon's logging areas.

Gabon joined the Belt and Road Initiative (BRI) in 2018.

== Cultural relations ==
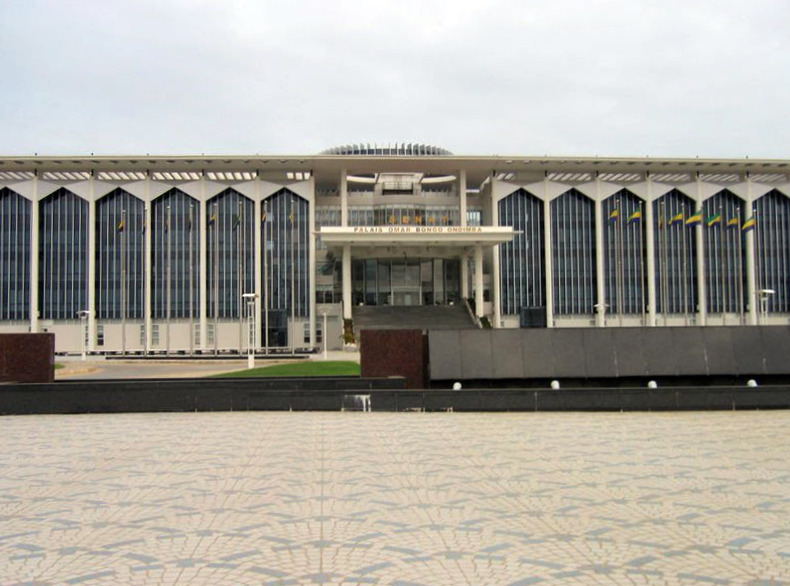
Gabonese Senate Building built with Chinese assistance

In the field of literature and art, in 1982, the People's Republic of China sent an acrobatic troupe to visit Gabon for the first time. Later, it sent art troupes to Gabon for performances many times, all of which were welcomed and well received by the Gabonese government and people. In 1985, Gabon also sent a dance troupe to visit and perform in China. In February 2014, Gabon National Television also cooperated with China Radio International to launch the Chinese TV series "The Good Times of Daughter-in-law" in Gabon for the first time. In the field of education, in 1975, one year after the establishment of diplomatic relations between China and Gabon, the government of the People's Republic of China began to provide government scholarships to Gabon. In Gabon, some higher education institutions such as Omar Bongo University have also opened Chinese courses. Among them, Bongo University and Tianjin Foreign Studies University of the People 's Republic of China jointly established the first Confucius Institute in Gabon in 2018.

Since the establishment of diplomatic relations, China has provided a lot of humanitarian assistance to Gabon, including the construction of the National Assembly Building, the Senate Building Friendship and some schools. In addition, China has provided Gabon with preferential loans to assist the country in building various facilities, such as a new building for the Gabonese national broadcaster in 2007. It has also provided Gabon with agricultural and animal husbandry technical support for a long time. After the outbreak of COVID-19 in Gabon, the Chinese government has successively provided Gabon with multiple batches of anti-epidemic materials and 400,000 doses of vaccines, and carried out anti-epidemic experience exchanges and cooperation with Gabon Chinese companies and institutions have also donated epidemic prevention materials. After the outbreak of COVID-19 in Gabon China has also donated epidemic prevention materials.

== Political relations ==
Gabon follows the one China principle. It recognizes the People's Republic of China as the sole government of China and Taiwan as an integral part of China's territory, and supports all efforts by the PRC to "achieve national reunification". It also considers Hong Kong, Xinjiang and Tibet to be China's internal affairs.

== Other cooperation ==
In 2009, the People's Liberation Army held a joint humanitarian and medical training practice in Gabon which was the PLA's first joint military exercise conducted in Africa.

On its 2017 medical mission to Africa, the People's Liberation Army Navy hospital ship Peace Ark traveled to Gabon.

In June 2020, Gabon was one of 53 countries that backed the Hong Kong national security law at the United Nations. In 2021, Gabon signed a letter to the UN stating, "Hong Kong, Xinjiang, and Tibet-related issues are China’s internal affairs that brook no interference."
