= Andorra–China relations =

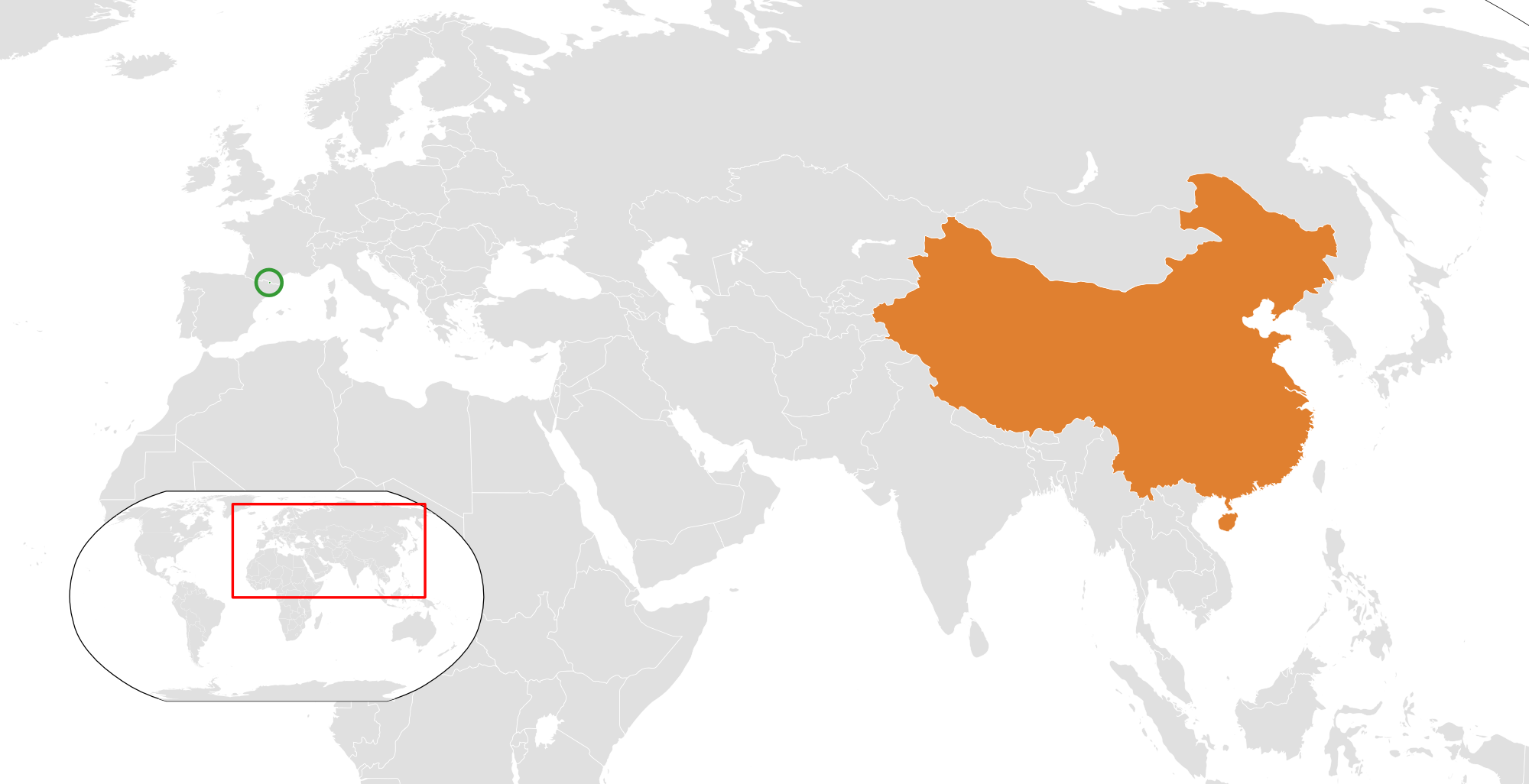
- Andorra: China

Andorra–China relations refers to the bilateral relations between the Principality of Andorra and the People's Republic of China. The two countries established diplomatic relations on June 29, 1994. Andorra does not have an embassy in China, and China is represented in Andorra by its embassy in Madrid, Spain.

== History ==
The two countries established diplomatic relations on June 29, 1994. In January 2005, Andorran Prime Minister Forne visited China. In August 2008, Andorran Prime Minister Pintate visited China to attend the opening ceremony of the Beijing Olympic Games. In May 2014, Andorran Foreign Minister Savoia and Tourism Minister Camp visited China. In February 2022, Andorran Minister of Culture and Sports Gonzalez visited China to attend the opening ceremony of the Beijing Winter Olympics. On June 26, 2024, China and Andorra jointly held a reception at the National Concert Hall in Andorra City to celebrate the 30th anniversary of the establishment of diplomatic relations.

== Economic relations ==
In 2022, the trade volume between China and Andorra was US$22.452 million, a year-on-year increase of 345.2%, of which China's exports were US$22.261 million and China's imports were US$191,000.

== Cultural relations ==
In February 2005, China and Andorra signed a memorandum of understanding on tourism cooperation. Since January 1, 2007, Andorra has officially become a destination for Chinese citizens’ outbound tourism.

The Confucius Institute at the University of Barcelona has a Confucius Classroom in Barcelona.
