= China–Togo relations =

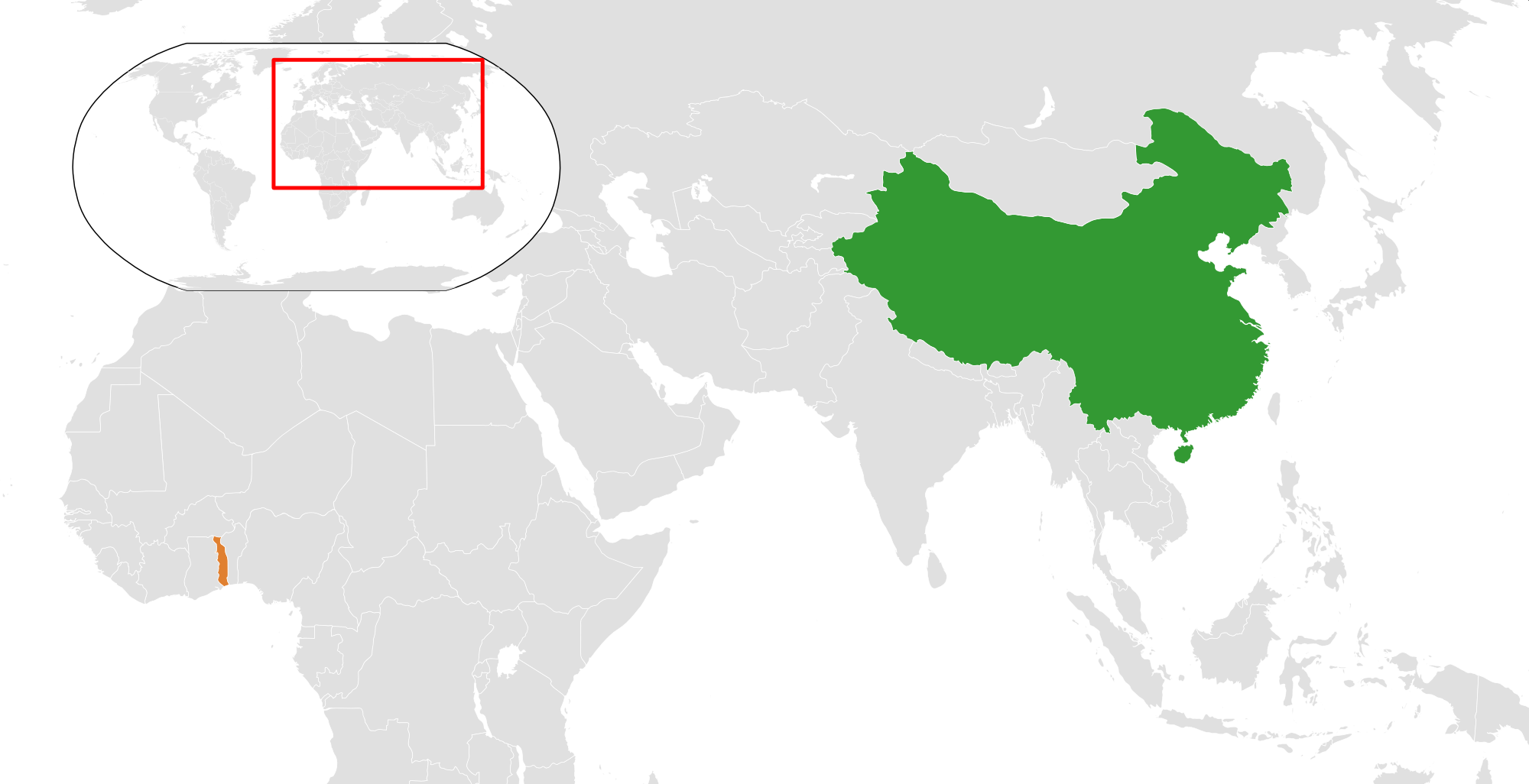
- China: Togo

China–Togo relations refer to the foreign relations between the People's Republic of China and Togo. The two countries established diplomatic relations on April 27, 1960, after the Republic of China (based in Taipei) recognized Togo's independence. Togo then recognized the PRC on September 19, 1972, as the sole legitimate government of "China".

== Economic relations ==
Embassy of Togo in China

Togo joined the Belt and Road Initiative (BRI) in 2018.

=== Chinese development finance to Togo ===
As a foreign aid project, China built Togo's Palais des Congrès de Kara.

From 2000 to 2011, there are approximately 40 Chinese official development finance projects identified in Togo through various media reports. These projects range from road rehabilitation projects in 2009, to a 60 million Euro loan for Togo's Banque Ouest Africaine de Developpement in 2011, and an approximately $31.7 million loan to the state operator Togo Telecom from Chinese EXIM Bank.

== Political relations ==
Togo follows the one China principle. It recognizes the People's Republic of China as the sole government of China and Taiwan as an integral part of China's territory, and supports all efforts by the PRC to "achieve national reunification". It also considers Hong Kong, Xinjiang and Tibet to be China's internal affairs. From 1960 to 1972, Togo had relations with the ROC.

In June 2020, Togo was one of 53 countries that backed the Hong Kong national security law at the United Nations.

== See also ==
- Foreign relations of Togo
