= Juan Pablo Cardenal =

Spanish journalist and writer

Juan Pablo Cardenal Nicolau (Barcelona, 1968) is a Spanish journalist and writer.

He resides in Hong Kong where he works as a correspondent for the Spanish business newspaper El Economista. His research about Chinese affairs in the world has attracted international recognition.

== Books ==
- La silenciosa conquista china (Crítica, 2011, with Heriberto Araújo)
