= Heriberto Araújo =

Spanish journalist and writer

Heriberto Araújo Rodríguez (born 1983) is a Spanish journalist and writer.

Rodriguez was born in Barcelona. He resides in Beijing where he works as a correspondent for the Mexican news agency Notimex. His research about Chinese affairs in the world has attracted international recognition.

== Books ==
- La silenciosa conquista china (Crítica, 2011, with Juan Pablo Cardenal)
