= China–Latin America relations =

China–Latin American relations
- Latin America: China

Latin America

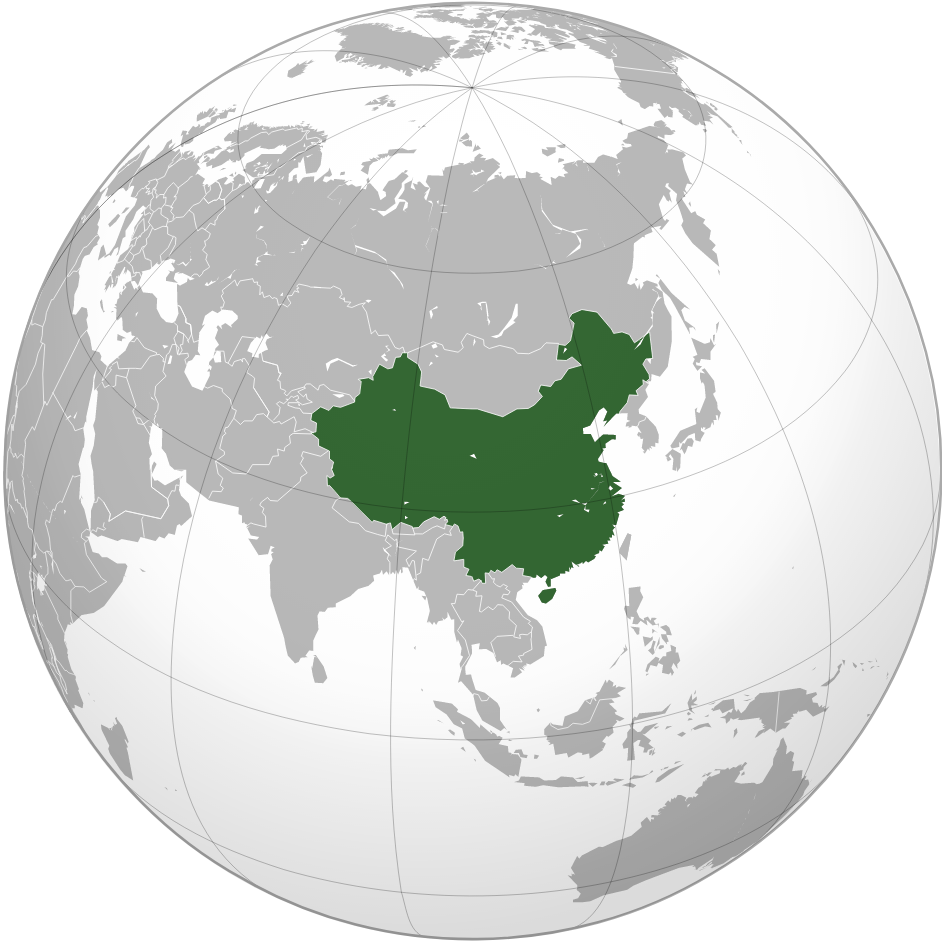
China

China–Latin America relations are relations between China and the countries of Latin America. Such relations have become increasingly important between the region and Latin America.

== Trade ==
Between 2000 and 2009, trade between China and Latin America increased by 1,200% from $10 to $130 billion. According to the Chinese Trade Ministry Counselor Yu Zhong, in 2011 the value of trade increased to $241.5 billion, making China the second largest trading partner of Latin America (the United States is the largest). The top five nations in this China-Latin trade were Brazil, Mexico, Chile, Venezuela and Argentina.

Among the factors for Latin America's economic growth from 2003-2013 was the commodities boom driven by demand in China.

In 2009 7% of Latin America's exports was to China. It consisted largely of raw material and commodities such as copper, iron ore, oil, and soybeans. China was the largest export market for Brazil, Chile, and Peru and the second largest for Argentina, Costa Rica, and Cuba. Four nations contributed 90% of the exports: Brazil (41%), Chile (23.1%), Argentina (15.9%), and Peru (9.3%). Increased Chinese demand has also been argued to increase the commodity prices of Latin American exports. In the case of Brazil the rise of a new middle class has even been seen as due to Chinese commodity demand. On the other hand, a large part of the exports of Costa Rica (which has a Free Trade Agreement with China), El Salvador, and Mexico to China were high-tech manufactured goods.

5% of China's exports went to Latin America in 2009 and consisted mainly of industrial and manufactured goods. Chinese goods are popular in part due to their low costs. Chinese manufacturers are also making substantial efforts to establish themselves as brand names for the new middle class. China is investing in power plants in Brazil, and repairing a railway in Argentina.

According to a 2012 Fitch ratings report, in 2010, 92% of Latin American exports to China were commodities; 85% of Chinese foreign direct investment went to extractive industries, as did 60% of Chinese loans. The report stated that the effects are mixed. Still, overall, Latin America has benefited from its relationship with China through higher commodity prices, increased growth, increased investment, and improved governmental finances. There are also concerns of environmental impacts related to the huge increase in extractive industries and agriculture by Chinese companies in Latin America, including pollution, deforestation, habitat destruction and rising fossil-fuel emissions.

There have been concerns regarding the relationship due to Latin America’s dependency on exports of low-value-added, highly price-volatile commodities that employ relatively few people. Latin American manufacturers have faced increasing competition from China in both domestic and international markets. In some countries, there have been protests against the rising inflow of Chinese-manufactured goods, local Chinese businesses, and perceived loss of manufacturing jobs to China.

The book The Dragon in the Room: China and the Future of Latin America found that 92% of manufacturing exports from Latin America were in sectors where China was increasing its market share while Latin America was decreasing its share, or where both China and Latin America were increasing their shares but Latin America at a slower rate. Several experts have even argued that the long-term outlooks for Latin American manufacturing are poor, and other sources for growth and trade, such as services, should be sought.

After the 2015–16 Chinese stock market turbulence many Chinese investment projects in Latin America were canceled or have slowed. These include the Nicaragua Canal.

As of 2026, South America's top trading partner is China.

== Political ==
China has been seen as an alternative to the United States and Europe by Latin American nations for support in the international community, for funding of infrastructure and humanitarian aid, and for creating economic growth. The number of high-level meetings between Chinese and Latin American officials have rapidly increased. These have been accompanied by several bilateral agreements. The creation of the BRICS group also helped to increase relations between China and Brazil.

Leaked diplomatic cables describe a divided Latin American opinion regarding China. Neil Dávila, head of Mexico's federal agency for promoting foreign commerce and investments, stated "We do not want to be China's next Africa," reflecting a common concern regarding the effects of Chinese involvement in Africa. Colombia, Brazil, and Chile also expressed concerns while Venezuela and Argentina were convinced that dependency on the United States must end and saw China as the greatest opportunity for their exports. Chinese officials in response has accused US diplomats of spreading mistrust and Chinese Vice-president Xi Jinping in 2009 in Mexico stated that "China does not export revolution. China exports neither hunger nor poverty. We do not cause problems. What more can be said of us?"

Many of the nations that continue to have official diplomatic relations with Taiwan are in Central America and the Caribbean. Taiwan has previously offered military exchanges and training as well as economic aid in return but has more recently had difficulty competing with China's economic incentives and in 2008 officially abandoned this "checkbook diplomacy". The remaining pro-Taiwan nations have been seen as waiting for better Chinese offers.

The formation of Community of Latin American and Caribbean States was warmly welcome by China in 2011. Hugo Chavez read aloud a letter from China's President Hu Jintao congratulating the leaders on forming the new regional bloc. On January 8, 2015, the 1st China-CELAC Forum opened at the Great Hall of the People in China.

In January 2019, numerous countries including the US recognized the legitimacy of opposition leader Juan Guaido as President of Venezuela. The PRC issued an official statement condemning American intervention in the internal affairs of Venezuela, supporting President Nicolás Maduro in the struggle for the Venezuelan presidency. On 3 January 2026, the United States carried out several strikes in Venezuela and detained and abducted President Maduro. China condemned the operation and called for Maduro's release. The strikes came a day after Maduro received a Chinese delegation on 2 January which included Special Representative of the Chinese Government on Latin American Affairs, Qiu Xiaoqi.

According to the 2026 Latinobarometro survey, China's global influence has, for the first time since the poll began in 1995, been viewed more favourably than that of the United States across Latin America. Among respondents in 17 countries, 65 percent saw China's influence as positive, while 57 percent said the same of US influence. These figures reflect a considerable transformation in regional perceptions over the preceding six years. In 2020, 48 percent of respondents held a positive view of China's influence, whereas 60 percent viewed US influence favourably—a proportion that has since declined.

== Military ==
Military relationships have been mainly through military-to-military contacts. In particular Venezuela, Chile, Bolivia, and Cuba have had frequent official military visits, exchange of military officers, and navy port calls. South American countries such as Venezuela, Bolivia, Ecuador, Peru and Argentina are buying Chinese weapons. Chile, Ecuador and Peru were visited by a Chinese flotilla in 2009.

In 2011 China and Bolivia signed a military-to-military cooperation agreement.

In 2015, China's Paramount leader Xi Jinping and President of Argentina, Cristina Fernandez de Kirchner, announced prospective arms sales and defense cooperation agreements extending beyond the scope of any made between China and a Latin American nation to date. These plans include Argentina’s purchase or coproduction of 110 8×8 VN-1 APCs, 14 JF-17/FC-1 multirole fighters, and five P18 Malvinas class patrol ships. While the government of President Mauricio Macri, elected in December 2015, soon dropped the arms purchases from China. that also authorizes construction of satellite tracking facility near Las Lajas, Neuquén; base is managed by People's Liberation Army Strategic Support Force. Per Argentine ambassador to China, Diego Guelar, China has agreed to use the base only for civilian purposes.

China operates two satellite tracking stations in Venezuela. Chinese state-owned China Great Wall Industry Corporation built the El Sombrero satellite tracking station at the Captain Manuel Ríos Aerospace Base and another at Luepa, Bolívar.

In King George Island, Antarctica, China and Chile share side-by-side military facilities. In 1982, with Pinochet's Chile allowed, China built a Great Wall research station in the Antarctic inside Chile's territorial claims.

== Space ==
China has launched communication satellites (from launch sites in China) for Venezuela, Bolivia, Ecuador, Brazil, and Argentina.

== Regional organizations ==
In 2004 China joined the Organization of American States as a permanent observer. In 2008 China joined the Inter-American Development Bank as a donor. China has also increased its relationships with CELAC, the Andean Community, PARLACEN, and the Caribbean Community.

== Cultural ==
The PRC actively seeks cultural exchanges with Latin America and CCTV-4 America has extensive Spanish language programming.

== Relations with Latin American countries ==
Relations between China and Latin America

Note: Different political entities have controlled mainland China: the Empire of China from 221 BC to 12 February 1912, the Republic of China from 12 February 1912 to 7 December 1949, and the People's Republic of China from 7 December 1949 to present. Since 1949, there has been a dispute between the People's Republic of China (PRC), controlling mainland China, and the Republic of China (ROC), controlling Taiwan, over which government represents China. China was represented in the United Nations by the Republic of China (ROC) from 24 October 1945 to 25 October 1971 and is currently represented by the People's Republic of China (PRC) since 25 October 1971. This list covers diplomatic relations by Latin American countries with China under its different political representations.

Country	Diplomatic relations began	Notes
Argentina	1945 (ROC); 16 February 1972 (PRC)	See Argentina–China relations: Argentina has an embassy in Beijing.; China has an embassy in Buenos Aires.
Bolivia	1919 (ROC); 9 July 1985 (PRC)	See Bolivia–China relations: Bolivia has an embassy in Beijing.; China has an embassy in La Paz.
Brazil	3 October 1881 (Qing); 1928 (ROC); 15 August 1974 (PRC)	See Brazil–China relations: Brazil has an embassy in Beijing.; China has an embassy in Brasília.
Chile	18 February 1915 (ROC); 15 December 1970 (PRC)	See Chile–China relations: Chile has an embassy in Beijing.; China has an embassy in Santiago.
Colombia	1941 (ROC); 7 February 1980 (PRC)	See China–Colombia relations: China has an embassy in Bogotá.; Colombia has an embassy in Beijing.
Costa Rica	1941 (ROC); 1 June 2007 (PRC)	See China–Costa Rica relations: China has an embassy in San José.; Costa Rica has an embassy in Beijing.
Cuba	16 September 1902 (Qing); 4 May 1913 (ROC); 28 September 1960 (PRC)	See China–Cuba relations: China has an embassy in Havana.; Cuba has an embassy in Beijing.
Dominican Republic	1941 (ROC); 1 May 2018 (PRC)	See China–Dominican Republic relations: China has an embassy in Santo Domingo.; Dominican Republic has an embassy in Beijing.
Ecuador	1946 (ROC); 2 January 1980 (PRC)	See China–Ecuador relations: China has an embassy in Quito.; Ecuador has an embassy in Beijing.
El Salvador	1941 (ROC); 21 August 2018 (PRC)	See China–El Salvador relations: China has an embassy in San Salvador.; El Salvador has an embassy in Beijing.
Guatemala	15 June 1933 (ROC)	See China–Guatemala relations: China and Guatemala do not have diplomatic relations due to Guatemala having diplomatic relations with Taiwan; China does not have an embassy in Guatemala City but is accredited to Guatemala from its embassy in San José, Costa Rica.; Guatemala does not have an embassy in Beijing.
Honduras	9 April 1941 (ROC); 26 March 2023 (PRC)	See China–Honduras relations: China has an embassy in Tegucigalpa.; Honduras has an embassy in Beijing.
Mexico	14 December 1899 (Qing); 1928 (ROC); 14 February 1972 (PRC)	See China–Mexico relations: China has an embassy in Mexico City.; Mexico has an embassy in Beijing.
Nicaragua	1930 (ROC); 7 December 1985 (PRC)	See China–Nicaragua relations: China has an embassy in Managua.; Nicaragua has an embassy in Beijing.
Panama	16 January 1910 (Qing); 1912 (ROC); 12 June 2017 (PRC)	See China–Panama relations: China has an embassy in Panama City.; Panama has an embassy in Beijing.
Paraguay	8 July 1957 (ROC on Taiwan)	See China–Paraguay relations: China and Paraguay do not have diplomatic relations due to Paraguay having diplomatic relations with Taiwan; China does not have an embassy in Asunción but is accredited to Paraguay from its consulate-general in São Paulo, Brazil.; Paraguay does not have an embassy in Beijing but is accredited to China from its embassy in Seoul, South Korea. Paraguay is accredited to Hong Kong and Macau from its embassy in Tokyo, Japan.
Peru	26 June 1874 (Qing); 1913 (ROC); 2 November 1971 (PRC)	See China–Peru relations: China has an embassy in Lima.; Peru has an embassy in Beijing.
Uruguay	1957 (ROC on Taiwan); 3 February 1988 (PRC)	See China–Uruguay relations: China has an embassy in Montevideo.; Uruguay has an embassy in Beijing.
Venezuela	1941 (ROC); 28 June 1974 (PRC)	See China–Venezuela relations: China has an embassy in Caracas.; Venezuela has an embassy in Beijing.

== See also ==
- Chinatowns in Latin America
- Sino-African relations
- Sino-Caribbean relations
- Sino-Pacific relations
- China-LAC Cooperation Fund
- Sino-Latin American Production Capacity Cooperation Investment Fund
- Forum of East Asia–Latin America Cooperation
- Debt-trap diplomacy
