= Chinese Uruguayans =

Chino Uruguayos; 中国人在乌拉圭

Total population
- 226 declare China as homeland; 400+ Uruguayans of Chinese ancestry

Regions with significant populations
- Montevideo

Languages
- Chinese, Uruguayan Spanish

Related ethnic groups
- Overseas Chinese

Chinese Uruguayans are Uruguayan citizens of Chinese ancestry or are Chinese people residing in Uruguay.

== Overview ==
The first flow of immigration arrived in 1949, coming from mainland China and Taiwan. Nowadays there are some 400 Chinese immigrants in Uruguay, mostly living in Montevideo. Their activities include gastronomy, fishing, groceries.

The 2011 Uruguayan census revealed 226 people who declared China as their country of birth. As of 2013, there are 44 Chinese citizens registered in the Uruguayan social security. Compared to neighboring Argentina and Brazil, with both nations containing a large population, Chinese immigration is significantly smaller in Uruguay.

There are a Chinese Uruguayan Association, a Uruguay-China Chamber of Commerce in Montevideo, and a Confucius Institute in Uruguay.

Some Chinese immigrants teach their language to Uruguayans.

== Notable people ==
- Cheung-Koon Yim (Beijing, 11 December 1936 - Montevideo, 7 November 2025), architect and university professor who fled from the Chinese Civil War.
- Adi Yacong Wu, professor of the Mandarin Chinese language.
- Jin Tan Meng (Guangzhou, 1982), businessman and first chinese-born uruguayan parliament member.

== See also ==
- China–Uruguay relations
- Chinese Argentines
