= China-LAC Cooperation Fund =

World Development Bank

- Type: Multilateral investment and financing cooperation fund
- Industry: Investment management; Project finance
- Founded: January 2016; 10 years ago
- Headquarters: Beijing, China
- Total assets: US$10 billion (target)
- Owner: Export-Import Bank of China

The China-LAC Cooperation Fund (abbreviated CLAC Fund) is a multilateral investment and financing cooperation fund established by the Chinese government to support projects in Latin America and the Caribbean. The fund comprises two components: a US$2 billion co-financing facility administered by the Inter-American Development Bank and a private equity fund administered by the Export-Import Bank of China.

In July 2014, General Secretary of the Chinese Communist Party Xi Jinping announced a US$5 billion commitment to form the fund during his visit to Brazil for the leaders' meeting between China and Latin American and Caribbean countries. In April 2015, the State Council increased the target size to US$10 billion. The fund was officially launched in January 2016.

It is one of three multilateral platforms created by the Chinese government to advance economic ties with Latin America. The others are the Sino-Latin American Production Capacity Cooperation Investment Fund and the Special Loan Program for China-Latin America Infrastructure.

== Structure ==
=== Private equity fund ===
The private equity fund has an initial commitment of US$3 billion from Chinese institutions and is administered by the Export-Import Bank of China. The fund targets investments in infrastructure, traditional and renewable energy, agriculture, mining, manufacturing, information technology, and medical care. It has invested in power generation projects in Brazil, partnering with China Three Gorges Corporation and other Chinese energy companies.

=== Co-financing fund ===
The China Co-financing Fund for Latin America and the Caribbean is a US$2 billion facility established in January 2013 with the People's Bank of China and administered by the Inter-American Development Bank. It was the first fund of its kind established between China and a multilateral development bank.

The fund provides capital to complement IDB loans for projects addressing poverty, inequality, climate change, and gender equality. Up to US$500 million supports public sector loans and up to US$1.5 billion supports private sector lending.

Projects financed through the co-financing fund include:

- (Ecuador) Distribution Network Rehabilitation Program (2014): US$50 million co-loan alongside US$170 million from IDB for electrical grid improvements.
- eco.business Fund (2017): US$20 million subordinated co-loan to support biodiversity conservation and sustainable business practices across Latin America and the Caribbean.
- (Colombia) Hidroituango dam: Co-financing partnership with IDB Invest.

== See also ==
- China–Caribbean relations
- China-CELAC Forum
- China–Brazil Fund
- China–Latin America relations
