= Caribbean Development Bank =

International financial institution

Coordinates: 13.0956330°N 59.576500°W

- Formation: October 18, 1969; 57 years ago
- Purpose: Regional development
- Headquarters: Wildey, St. Michael, Barbados
- Members: 28 (19 borrowing members) (9 non-borrowing members)
- President: Daniel Best
- Website: www.caribank.org

The Caribbean Development Bank (CDB) is a development bank that helps Caribbean countries finance social and economic programs in its member countries through loans, grants, and technical assistance. The CDB was established by an Agreement signed on October 18, 1969, in Kingston, Jamaica, which entered into force on January 26, 1970. The idea for the bank originated from the 1966 Canada/Commonwealth Caribbean Conference.

The permanent headquarters of the CDB is located in Wildey, St. Michael, Barbados, adjacent to the campus of the Samuel Jackman Prescod Polytechnic. On September 21, 2018, the Bank officially opened its Country Office in Haiti, the first outside its Headquarters in Barbados. The headquarters in Barbados serves all of the regional borrowing member countries, with staff recruited from its member states.

== History ==
The Caribbean Development Bank was established by an agreement between sixteen members of the Commonwealth of Nations in the Caribbean region, along with Canada and the United Kingdom. Signed on October 18, 1969, in Kingston, Jamaica, the Agreement entered into force on January 26, 1970, when 15 of the 18 signing states ratified it. The bank's initial capital was US$50 million, equivalent to 100 million Eastern Caribbean dollar, with main contributions from Jamaica (US$11,200,000 and 19.52% of votes), and the United Kingdom and Canada contributing US$10,000,000 each with 17.55% of votes in bank.

The bank was created with the purpose of promoting sustainable economic growth and reducing poverty in the region, aligning with W. Arthur Lewis's vision of economic development. During the first meeting of governors in Nassau, Lewis, who was an economist, was appointed the first president of the Caribbean Development Bank. His leadership was essential to establishing the bank's operations, emphasizing the importance of financial discipline and efficiency in development through agriculture and infrastructure projects. At this time, the bank aimed to reduce economic disparities among its member states by using soft loans to finance public works and agricultural development in the less developed states.

Lewis set the CDB's independence up by retaliating against political interference in the financial decisions of the bank. He also ensured there would be efficient administration and a focus on the Caribbean states to become a key financial instrument for the countries that lacked access to international financial institutions. Lewis also played a key role in building strong relationships with other international organizations like the Inter-American Development Bank (IDB) and USAID that helped the bank gain legitimacy and credibility.

As part of the different relationships that China has built with Multilateral Development Banks since the 1980s The Asian state joined the Caribbean Development Bank and became a non regional member in January of 1998.

In 2017 the Caribbean Development Bank hosted a conference in Barbados which focus was Chinese Renminbi in the Caribbean: Opportunities for Trade, Aid and Investment, Dr. Wu Qijin, Chief Executive Officer of the China–LAC Cooperation Fund (this version), spoke about the investment cooperation that is growing between China and the Caribbean states.

In 2022 the CDB signed a cooperative strategic partnership agreement with the African Development Bank (AfDB).

== Organization ==
=== Board of Governors ===
The Board of Governors is the apex governing body of the CDB. It meets annually and has the authority to:

- Admit new members
- Amend the charter
- Elect the board of directors and President
- Change the bank's outstanding capital
- Dissolve the bank.

Each country is represented by one governor and one alternate, with the British Overseas Territory members counted as one country.

=== Board of directors ===
The board of directors is responsible for:

- Determining the bank's programs and annual budget
- Overseeing its operations
- Appointing the Oversight and Assurance Committee

As with the Board of Governors, each country is represented by one director and one alternate. Directors serve renewable two-year terms.

=== President ===
The President is the chief executive officer of the CDB, and also serves as the chairman of the board of directors. Different offices for communication, risk management, and compliance are part of the Office of the President.

Presidential candidates are nominated by individual country members. A candidate must receive votes from two-thirds of the Board of Governors (representing 75% of the member countries) in order to be selected. The President serves for a five-year term, with the possibility of re-election.

=== List of presidents ===
The Bank has had seven presidents since its inception.

| Name | Dates | Nationality |
|---|---|---|
| William Arthur Lewis | 1970–1973 | Saint Lucia |
| William G. Demas | 1974–1988 | Trinidad and Tobago |
| Neville Nicholls | 1988–2001 | Barbados |
| Compton Bourne | 2001–2011 | Guyana |
| William Warren Smith | 2011–2021 | Jamaica |
| Hyginus 'Gene' Leon | 2021–2024 | Saint Lucia |
| Daniel Best | 2025–Present | Barbados |

=== Corporate leadership ===
The two corporate leaders that report to the boards are the Vice-president Finance and Corporate Services and the vice-president (Operations).

== Financial Overview ==
As of December 31, 2021, the CDB's total assets stood at US$3.71 billion, which included US$2.21 billion of Ordinary Capital Resources and US$1.50 billion of Special Funds Resources.

The Bank holds a high credit rating from international agencies:

- Aa1 (Stable) by Moody's
- AA+ (Stable) by Standard & Poor's
- AA+ (Stable) by Fitch Ratings.

In 2021, the Bank approved US$269.5 million in loans and grants. At the end of 2020, the total value approved projects by the bank was US$122.6 million, including US$71.2 million in loans and US$51.4 million in grants.

== Membership ==
The CDB's membership consists of 28 countries, including:

- 19 regional borrowing members
- 4 regional, non-borrowing members: Brazil, Colombia, Mexico and Venezuela
- 5 non-regional, non-borrowing members: Canada, China, Germany, Italy, and the United Kingdom

=== Member states ===
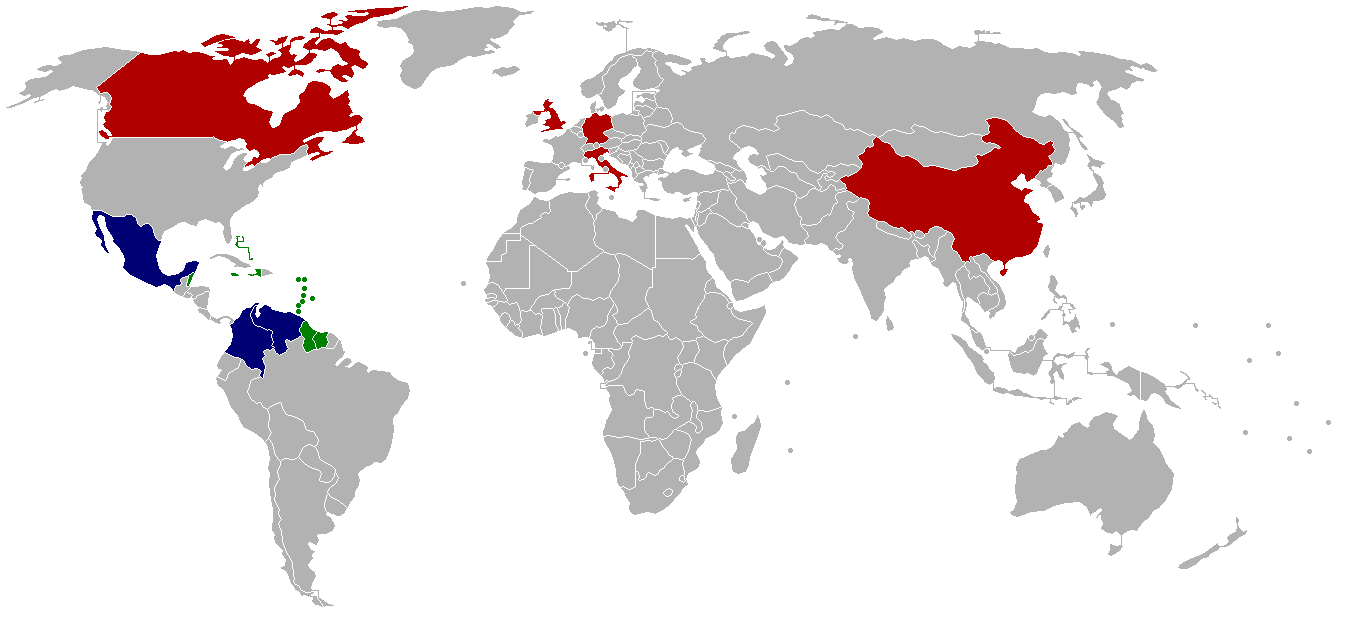
Regional in green, other regional blue, non-regional members in red

As of 2023, there are nineteen borrowing members and nine non-borrowing members.

==== Regional ====
- Anguilla
- Antigua and Barbuda
- Bahamas
- Barbados
- Belize
- British Virgin Islands
- Cayman Islands
- Dominica
- Grenada
- Guyana
- Haiti
- Jamaica
- Montserrat
- Saint Kitts and Nevis
- Saint Lucia
- Saint Vincent and the Grenadines
- Suriname
- Trinidad and Tobago
- Turks and Caicos Islands

=== Other regional ===
- Brazil
- Colombia
- Mexico
- Venezuela

=== Non-regional ===
- Canada
- China
- Germany
- Italy
- United Kingdom

== United Nations Development Business ==
The United Nations launched Development Business in 1978 with the support of the Caribbean Development Bank, the World Bank, and many other major development banks from around the world. Today, Development Business is the primary publication for all major multilateral development banks, United Nations agencies, and several national governments, many of whom have made the publication of their tenders and contracts in Development Business a mandatory requirement.

== Recent Developments and Risk Management ==
In 2012, the CDB experienced a credit downgrade due to weaknesses in the banks credit profile. The downgrade reflected concerns about the deteriorating financial conditions of its borrowing member countries, this posed risks the banks ability to finance loans effectively. There were also inefficiencies in CDB's risk management practices which prompted the bank to adopt an Enterprise Risk Management framework to address these issues. This design was meant strengthen the bank's governance, risk management, and operational processes, ensuring better oversight, accountability, and financial stability.

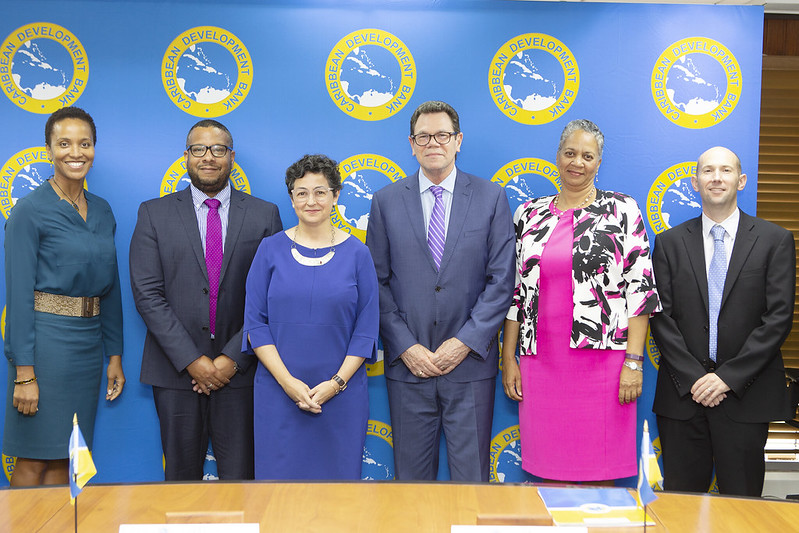
July 2018 - ITC and Caribbean Development Bank (CDB) announce scaled-up partnership

== Partnerships ==
The CDB collaborates with distinct institutions like the Green Climate Fund to promote sustainable development and climate resilience across the region. The bank also facilitates soft loans and technical assistance for its smaller member states by working closely with partners like the Inter-American Development Bank and the World Bank.

In 2018, the Caribbean Development Bank and the International Trade Centre (ITC) strengthened their partnership to enhance support for the business sector across the Caribbean region. During the meeting that took place in Bridgetown, Barbados both institutions confirmed the International Trade Centre as a key partner and leader in the development of projects in the region.

The CDB further works with other entities such as the United Nations Economic Commission for Latin America (ECLAC) as a supporter of the Forum of the countries of Latin America and the Caribbean on Sustainable Development.

== See also ==
- African Development Bank
- African, Caribbean and Pacific Group of States
- Asian Development Bank
- Asian Infrastructure Investment Bank
- Association of Caribbean States
- CAF – Development Bank of Latin America and the Caribbean
- CARIFORUM–United Kingdom Economic Partnership Agreement
- Central banks and currencies of the Caribbean
- European Investment Bank
- New Development Bank (BRICS)/NDB BRICS
- Islamic Development Bank
