= Marco Rubio's anti-narcotics diplomacy in the Caribbean =

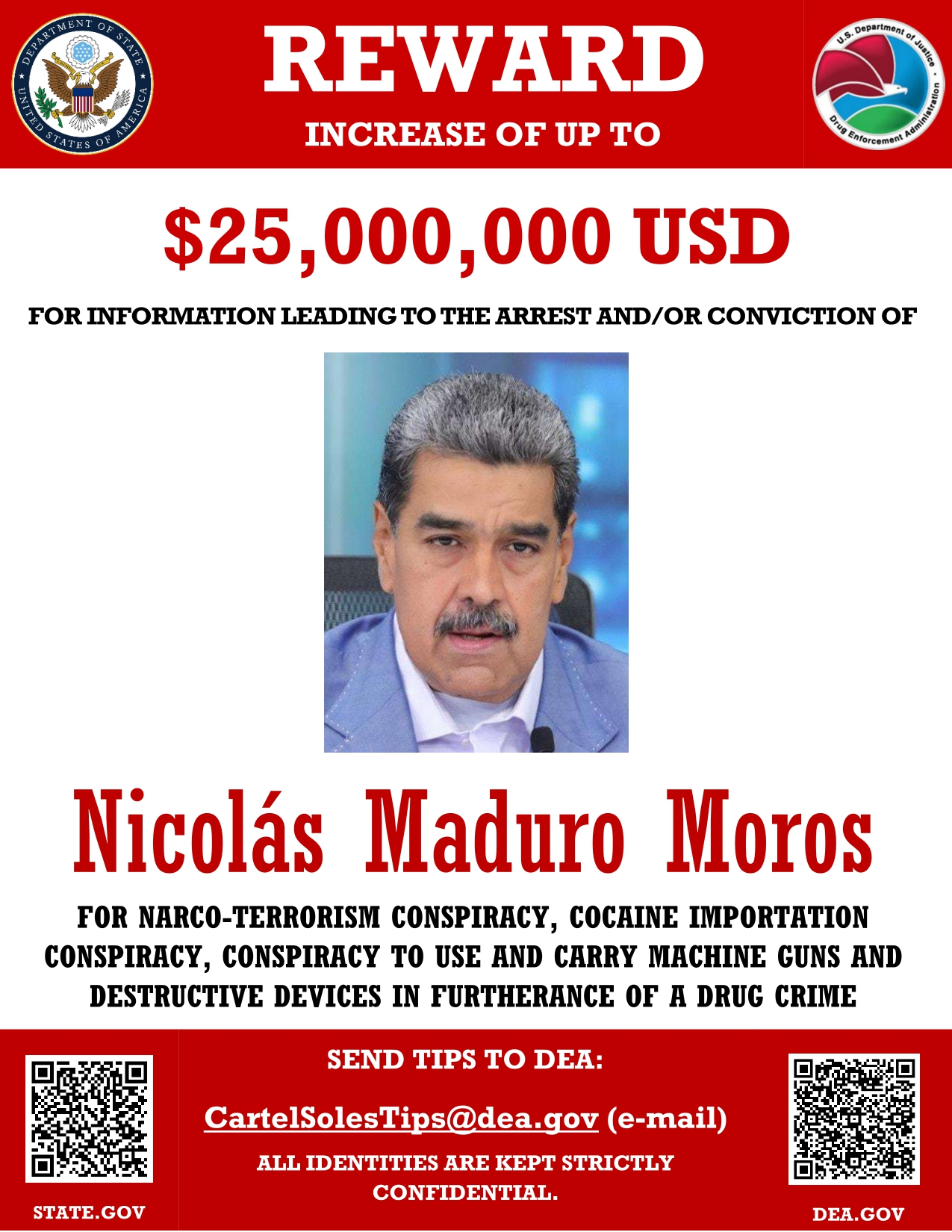
Poster in which the DEA offers 25 million dollars for Nicolás Maduro

Marco Rubio’s diplomatic efforts in the Caribbean, particularly in anti-narcotics policy, have been central to his tenure as U.S. Secretary of State. During his visits in early 2025, Rubio reinforced U.S. support for regional security, ostensibly focusing on combating drug trafficking and limiting Chinese influence. On February 6, 2025, he visited Costa Rica, offering cooperation from the DEA and FBI to combat drug-related crime, while also endorsing Costa Rica’s restrictions on Chinese companies in 5G development. Rubio’s March 2025 regional tour included Guyana and Suriname, where he signed security agreements to strengthen intelligence sharing and military cooperation, linking Venezuela's territorial claims to narcotrafficking. In the Dominican Republic, he worked with President Luis Abinader to address drug trafficking and irregular migration, while announcing a memorandum of understanding for U.S. border collaboration. Additionally, Rubio’s efforts extended to Panama, where he secured commitments to audit Chinese-controlled ports and withdraw from China’s Belt and Road Initiative.

== Visits by country ==
- One visit to Costa Rica, the Dominican Republic, El Salvador, Guatemala, Guyana, Jamaica, Panama, and Suriname.

== Key policy themes ==
Marco Rubio's anti-narcotics diplomacy in the Caribbean has focused on enhancing cooperation with the region to address shared security concerns, particularly drug trafficking. The Caribbean is a major hub for drug shipments, with rising cocaine seizures linked to increased violence driven by transnational gangs.

Rubio has supported the Caribbean Basin Security Initiative (CBSI), which by 2024 had allocated over $942 million in aid since its launch in 2009. Despite the challenges posed by budget cuts, Rubio emphasized the importance of continuing support for counter-narcotics and security initiatives. His visit to the region in 2025 also aimed to strengthen U.S.-Caribbean partnerships, counter Chinese influence, and address the crisis in Haiti, where the U.S. has backed a multinational mission. Rubio’s diplomatic initiatives are part of broader U.S. efforts to secure energy resources, with particular attention on the growing significance of oil discoveries in Guyana and Suriname.

=== Panama ===
In February 2025, Secretary of State Marco Rubio's visit to Panama emphasized U.S. concerns over Chinese influence in the Panama Canal, which the U.S. has historically viewed as vital to its strategic interests. During talks with Panamanian President José Raúl Mulino, Rubio warned that Panama's ties with China, particularly the control of key canal ports by a Chinese company, could violate the neutrality of the canal as outlined in the 1977 treaty. Although Rubio refrained from direct threats, the U.S. communicated its intention to protect its treaty rights, a stance reflective of the Trump administration's assertive foreign policy. Rubio also addressed illegal immigration, urging Panama to enhance cooperation with the U.S. on migration control, despite ongoing reductions in U.S. aid to Central America.

=== Cuba ===
Marco Rubio's anti-narcotics diplomacy in the Caribbean focused on curbing transnational crime and addressing Cuba’s labor export program. During his March 2025 regional visit, Rubio warned that countries employing Cuban doctors could face U.S. visa restrictions, arguing the program exploits workers. Some Caribbean leaders defended the initiative as essential for healthcare. U.S. Special Envoy Mauricio Claver-Carone also linked Caribbean "citizen-by-investment" programs to security risks, citing concerns over illicit actors.

=== Guyana ===
During his March 2025 Caribbean visit, U.S. Secretary of State Marco Rubio emphasized energy security and regional stability, particularly in Guyana. Washington expressed support for Guyana’s oil production while addressing security concerns amid its territorial dispute with Venezuela. U.S. Special Envoy Mauricio Claver-Carone stressed the need for security measures to protect investments, rejecting renewables as a substitute for fossil fuel development. The U.S. also warned of potential visa restrictions on Caribbean nations with citizenship-by-investment programs, citing security risks.

=== El Salvador ===
Marco Rubio’s visit to Central America as Secretary of State reinforced the Trump administration’s hardline stance on narcotics and migration, with El Salvador emerging as a key ally. President Nayib Bukele pledged full cooperation, agreeing to detain deported migrants from other nations in the country’s controversial mega-prison. In return, Rubio praised El Salvador’s aggressive anti-gang policies, which have drastically reduced crime but drawn criticism for human rights violations. The visit underscored Washington’s transactional diplomacy, rewarding compliance with security partnerships while sidelining nations that resist U.S. directives.

=== Guatemala ===
In Guatemala, Rubio secured a commitment from President Bernardo Arévalo to expand deportation flights by 40% and launch a new Border Task Force aimed at curbing drug trafficking along the Honduran and Salvadoran borders. The agreements also included U.S. investment in infrastructure, with plans for expanded ports and highways to strengthen regional trade. Rubio’s warning against political instability resonated with Arévalo, who faces opposition from entrenched elites accused of corruption. The visit reaffirmed Guatemala’s strategic role in U.S. security policy while reinforcing its alignment with Washington on issues like Taiwan and Israel.

=== Nicaragua ===
Rubio’s stance on Nicaragua was notably harsher, as he labeled the Ortega-Murillo regime an “enemy of humanity” and suggested its removal from the DR-CAFTA trade agreement. While no immediate action was taken, his comments signaled increasing U.S. pressure on the authoritarian government, particularly regarding its alliances with China and Russia. Rubio emphasized that Nicaragua’s role as both a commercial partner and a regional destabilizer was unsustainable, hinting at future economic and diplomatic consequences.

== Reception ==
Marco Rubio's anti-narcotics diplomacy in the Caribbean has received mixed reactions. During a March 2025 visit, Rubio aimed to strengthen counter-narcotics efforts amid rising drug violence. While regional leaders supported continued U.S. assistance through the Caribbean Basin Security Initiative, concerns emerged about potential funding cuts under the Trump administration. Rubio reassured Haiti of U.S. aid despite a foreign aid freeze, though some questioned whether pledges would be fulfilled. Analysts also emphasized the need for increased U.S. investment to counter China's growing influence. Rubio's efforts were seen as essential, but skepticism remained regarding long-term commitment. Additionally, in 2021, Rubio's visit to the Dominican Republic underscored improved U.S.-Dominican cooperation on drug trafficking and security, with a focus on strengthening bilateral relations and enhancing anti-drug operations.
