= SinoLatin Capital =

Chinese bank focused on Latin American investments

- Type: Private
- Industry: Financial services
- Founded: 2009
- Founders: Erik Bethel, Luis Gomez Cobo, Rafael Valdez Mingramm
- Defunct: 2014
- Fate: Acquired by Franklin Templeton Investments
- Headquarters: Shanghai
- Products: Investment banking, Merchant banking

SinoLatin Capital was a Shanghai-based-merchant bank founded in late 2008 / early 2009 specializing in private equity and research focused exclusively on cross border transactions between China and Latin America. The firm also provided advisory services related to mergers and acquisitions, corporate restructurings and financings. Additionally, the firm managed a pool capital for private equity investments. The firm was sold to a division of Franklin Templeton.

SinoLatin Capital focused on sectors of strategic importance to Chinese investors, such as oil and gas, mining, agribusiness and forestry.

The firm also produced research on the fundamentals for Sino-Latin trade

The firm was founded in 2009 by Erik Bethel Gonzalez, Luis Gomez-Cobo, Rafael Valdez Mingramm and Jorge Barreda Cruz. It was the inaugural merchant bank to be concentrated solely on international dealings between China and Latin America. The scholar the firm "was doing well" in how it managed Chinese-Latin America transactions.

== Private equity ==
In 2012, SinoLatin Capital's private equity subsidiary was appointed to manage a pool of equity and debt capital by the Inter-American Development Bank and China Export Import Bank.
