= Cheung-Koon Yim =

Chinese-born Uruguayan architect (1936–2025)

Cheung-Koon Yim, affectionately known as Chino Yim (11 December 1936 – 8 November 2025), was a Chinese-born architect and university professor, active in Uruguay.

== Biography ==
Yim was born in Beijing. He arrived in Uruguay aged 16, together with his family, fleeing from the Chinese Civil War. Upon arrival in Montevideo, he started a quick adaptation process, learning Spanish in record time. At age 19, he entered the School of Architecture at the University of the Republic, graduating as an Architect 9 years later. Soon afterwards, he became one of its most notable faculty members, leading a big project workshop for decades. He also participated in territorial planning for housing cooperatives and informal settlements in the interior of the country. In the 1990s, he joined the infrastructure works monitoring committee for the Colonia-Buenos Aires bridge project.

He decided to establish the Uruguay-China Cultural Integration Centre, becoming its first teacher. In 1985, he helped erect the monument to the philosopher Confucius in Parque Rodó. He also worked as director of then newly established Confucius Institute in Uruguay. He died on 8 November 2025 in Montevideo, aged 88.

Yim married three times and was father of four: Nanshi, Ania, Yuyú, and Iang.
