= Confucius Institute in Uruguay =

Chinese cultural institution in Uruguay

The Confucius Institute at the University of the Republic (Spanish: Instituto Confucio en la Universidad de la República, short form: Instituto Confucio en Uruguay; Chinese: 乌拉圭共和国大学孔子学院) is a local branch in Uruguay of the Confucius Institute from Beijing. It is a non-profit institution created with the aim of promoting the teaching of the Chinese language and knowledge of Chinese culture in Uruguay. It was established on 29 November 2017 in collaboration between the University of the Republic of Uruguay and Qingdao University in China.

Since its inception, there has been great demand for courses, not only in language, but also in Chinese calligraphy, painting and cuisine. Its first director was the Sino-Uruguayan architect Cheung-Koon Yim (1936–2025).

It is the only centre in the country authorised to administer the Hanyu Shuiping Kaoshi (HSK) and Hanyu Shuiping Kouyu Kaoshi (HSKK) international examinations, and it offers preparation courses.
