= Hong Kong–Nicaragua relations =

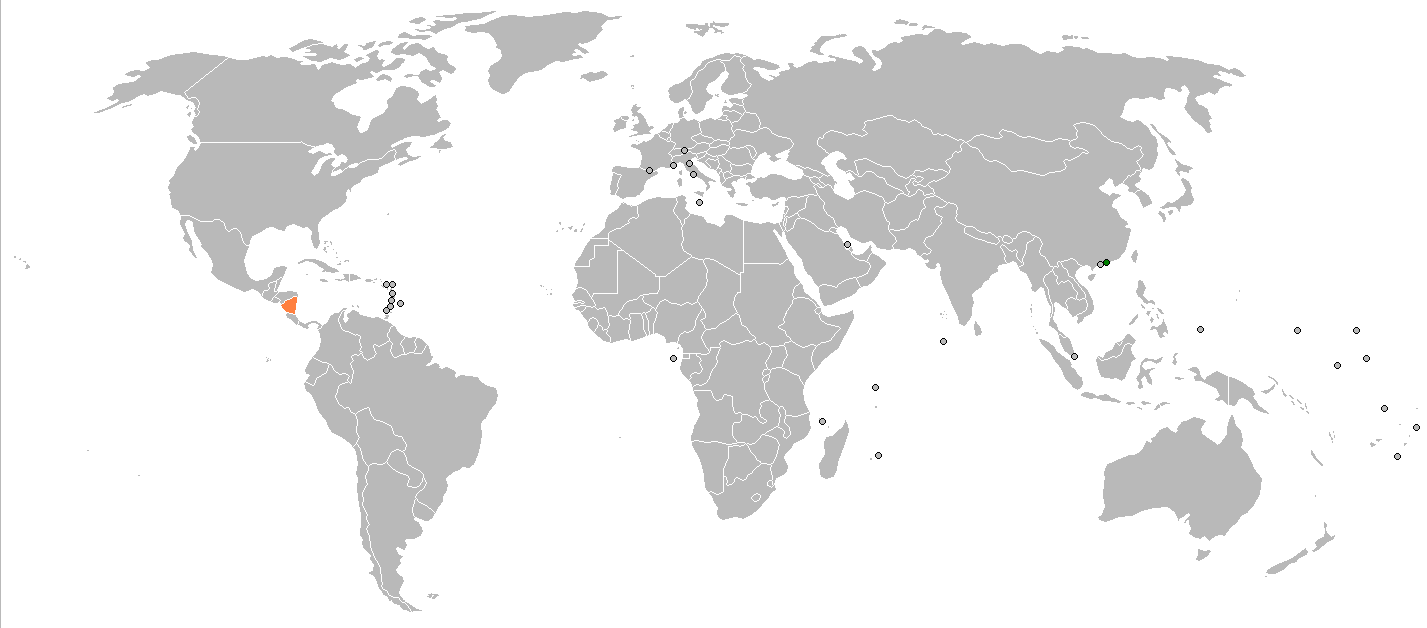

- Hong Kong: Nicaragua

Hong Kong–Nicaragua relations refers to the bilateral relationship between Hong Kong and Nicaragua.

== History ==
Hong Kong was a trading outpost of Ming Empire and Nicaragua was part of the transcontinental Spanish Empire in the late 16th Century. The Ming Empire and the Spanish Empire's direct contact can be traced back to the 1570s when the Spaniards were able to establish Manila as a trade base. The pre-modern trans-Pacific linkage had a far-reaching impact that touched areas including Hong Kong and Nicaragua.

The trade between the two prospers nowadays. In 2014, the value of exports from Hong Kong to Nicaragua was worth 363M Hong Kong dollars, while the importing goods from Nicaragua to Hong Kong was worth 108M Hong Kong dollars. Major exports from Hong Kong are light rubberized knitted fabric (51%) and heavy pure woven cotton (22%). Major exports from Nicaragua to Hong Kong are non-retail pure molluscs (22%), and prepared meat (more than 13%).

Nicaragua maintained a consulate in Hong Kong prior to the 1997 transfer of sovereignty from British administration to the People's Republic of China (PRC). Nicaragua had diplomatic relations with Taiwan and not with the PRC until 2021.

== Nicaraguan Canal ==
The cooperation between the two has been more significant and controversial in the development of the Nicaraguan Canal. Nicaragua's National Assembly approved a bill to grant a 50-year concession to finance and manage the project to the Hong Kong–based company, Hong Kong Nicaragua Canal Development Investment Company (HKND Group) in 2013. The Hong Kong investment has created one of the most significant and controversial trade agreements in Nicaraguan history. The canal, once completed, would provide an alternative passage between the Atlantic Ocean and Pacific Ocean. The concession can be extended for another 50 years once the waterway is operational. The major dispute is the concern on the project's environmental impact, especially on Lake Nicaragua, which would be joint by the two world's largest oceans to form one of the busiest shipping route once the canal would be built. It was also expected that local communities and local people's ways of living would be highly affected. It has been argued that Nicaragua sold its sovereignty to a Hong Kong company for a century after negotiated without transparency and national consensus. Critics have speculated the funding behind the Hong Kong company has been state-supported, as part of the Chinese grand strategy in controlling the Pacific-Atlantic trade route, especially with the fact that the only other choice of the route, the Panama Canal, is simultaneously controlled by another Hong Kong company, the Hutchison Whampoa.

== Cultural and social ==
According to anthropological studies, both Hong Kong and Nicaragua have been using stone beater for bark cloth manufacturing, which is an indicator of the spread of cultural identity and technology in Bark Clothing. In 2015, a Hong Kong led large scale of archaeological survey was conducted in Nicaragua. More than 1,500 pieces of artifacts, including prehistoric painted pottery dated to 500-1500 AD, were unearthed in the first phase of the excavation. While more discoveries are anticipated in the future, 15,000 pieces of artefacts, including pottery, stone tools, and obsidian were retrieved for Nicaraguan governmental storage.

The relations between the two have a focus on economic, social and cultural aspects because Hong Kong is restricted by Hong Kong Basic Law from concluding military agreements with foreign countries and international organizations.
