= China–Paraguay relations =

- China: Paraguay

Paraguay has never established diplomatic relations with the People's Republic of China (PRC), but it has maintained diplomatic relations with the Republic of China (Taiwan) since 1957.

PRC affairs in Paraguay are handled by the Consulate General of China in São Paulo, Brazil. Paraguayan affairs with the PRC are handled by their Embassy in South Korea, while their affairs with Hong Kong and Macau are handled by their Embassy in Japan.

== History ==
During the Cold War, the Paraguayan government pursued anti-communism and had little trade with the PRC and other socialist countries.

In 1957, the Republic of Paraguay established diplomatic relations with Taiwan. In 1989, China sent diplomats to negotiate with Paraguayan President Andrés Rodríguez on the establishment of diplomatic relations, but was unsuccessful. Paraguay currently maintains diplomatic relations with Taiwan, but not with China. Paraguay is currently the only South American country that has diplomatic relations with Taiwan.

From 1995 to 1997, Paraguay had a consulate in British Hong Kong, but it was closed on the eve of Hong Kong's return to China.

In September 1997, during his attendance at the UN General Assembly, Vice Premier and Foreign Minister Qian Qichen of China met with Paraguayan Foreign Minister Rubén Melgarejo Ransoni. Both agreed that the two countries' permanent missions in the United Nations would be to discuss the establishment of trade representative offices in each other's countries. However, this was ultimately unsuccessful.

On January 9, 2015, Paraguayan Foreign Minister Loizaga led a delegation to Beijing to attend the first ministerial meeting of the China-CELAC Forum. The Paraguayan delegation attended the second and third ministerial meetings of the China-CELAC Forum in 2018 and 2021, respectively.

On April 17, 2020, the Paraguayan Senate formally voted on a motion to establish diplomatic relations with China. The motion was proposed by the left-wing political party alliance Frente Guasú, which believed that turning to China would promote cooperation between the two sides and exchange Paraguayan agricultural products for epidemic prevention materials from China. 41 of 45 senators voted, and the resolution was not passed with 16 votes in favor and 25 votes against.

Before the 2023 Paraguayan general election, Efraín Alegre, a candidate for the Authentic Radical Liberal Party, said that if he won the election in April, he would establish diplomatic relations with China. However, in the general election at the end of April, Alegre lost.

In 2024, Flax Typhoon, an advanced persistent threat linked to the Chinese state, was found to have infiltrated government networks. Chinese firm Huawei has also been accused of spying on Taiwanese diplomats in Paraguay. In 2024, Xu Wei, Minister-Counselor of the Latin American Department of China, attempted to lobby members of the Paraguayan Congress to sever diplomatic ties with Taiwan and establish diplomatic ties with China. The Paraguayan Ministry of Foreign Affairs announced that Xu Wei was considered persona non grata for interfering in internal affairs, revoked his visa and expelled him from the country.

In October 2026, China sanctioned Paraguay's communications minister, citing the country's ties with Taiwan.

== Economic relations ==
According to statistics from the General Administration of Customs of China, the total trade volume between China and Paraguay in 2019 was US$1.447 billion, of which China's exports amounted to US$1.431 billion and imports amounted to US$0.16 billion, down 15.4%, 14.4% and 59.3% year-on-year respectively.

On October 18, 2018, Qin Gang, Vice Foreign Minister of the China, held the Sixth China-MERCOSUR Dialogue with Uruguayan Vice Foreign Minister Ariel Bergamino, Brazilian Vice Foreign Minister António Costa, Paraguayan Vice Foreign Minister Delgadillo, and Argentine Deputy Secretary of State for Foreign Affairs Arana in Montevideo, the capital of Uruguay.
