= China–Brazil Fund =

Investment fund

Brazil-China Cooperation Fund for the Expansion of Production Capacity
- Company type: Bilateral investment cooperation fund
- Industry: Investment Management
- Founded: 2017; 9 years ago
- Owner: Chinese government and Brazil government

The China-Brazil Fund is a bilateral investment cooperation fund established by the Chinese and Brazilian governments to funnel Chinese infrastructure and industrial investment into Brazil. The fund is seen as mutually beneficial as infrastructure has lagged in Brazil while China purchases Brazilian grain that is transported to port before shipment to China.

== Fundraising ==
The fund was jointly established by the Ministry of Planning, Budget and Management and Sino-Latin American Production Capacity Cooperation Investment Fund (Claifund). The initial contribution for the fund was US$20 billion with US$15 billion from the Claifund and US$5 billion from the Brazilian Development Bank and Caixa Econômica Federal.

== Investments ==
The fund is focused on infrastructure development according to remarks in 2017 by then Chinese Vice Premier Wang Yang. The fund is expected to invest heavily in Brazilian railways. The Brazilian Ministry of Planning, Development and Management announced five projects, four in infrastructure and one in industry, were to be funded in May 2018.
