= China–Nicaragua relations =

- China: Nicaragua

Official relations between China and Nicaragua began in 1985, but were broken in 1990 as a result of Nicaragua's recognition of Taiwan. Relations were restored in 2021. China has an embassy in Managua and Nicaragua has an embassy in Beijing.

== History ==
During the Cold War, Nicaragua only maintained formal diplomatic relations with the Republic of China (Taiwan). The Xinhua News Agency opened a branch office in Managua after the Nicaraguan Revolution broke out in 1979. The Nicaraguan government, which was led by Daniel Ortega, first established formal relations with China in 1985, and both countries soon opened resident embassies in their respective capitals. In spite of this, China supplied arms to the rebel Contras to bolster ties with the United States and counter Soviet influence in Central America.

Ortega was defeated in the 1990 Nicaraguan general election by Violeta Chamorro, who declared the restoration of diplomatic relations with Taiwan. China subsequently severed diplomatic relations. Additionally, Nicaragua shut down its consulate before the transfer of sovereignty of Hong Kong, which was established during British rule.

In December 2021, Nicaragua suspended its relations with Taiwan and restored its relations with China. After restoring relations, Nicaragua and China signed a number of agreements by which China would provide economic assistance for the development of 12,000 units of public housing and infrastructure including ports, railways, energy, and water projects. From 2023 to 2026, the Nicaraguan government awarded 80 mining concessions to Chinese companies, covering 1.4 million hectares or 11% of Nicaragua’s land surface in total.

== See also ==
- Hong Kong–Nicaragua relations
