= China–Mexico relations =

- China: Mexico

Diplomatic relations between the People's Republic of China and the United Mexican States were established in 1972. Both nations are members of the Asia-Pacific Economic Cooperation, Forum of East Asia–Latin America Cooperation, G-20 major economies and the United Nations.

== History ==
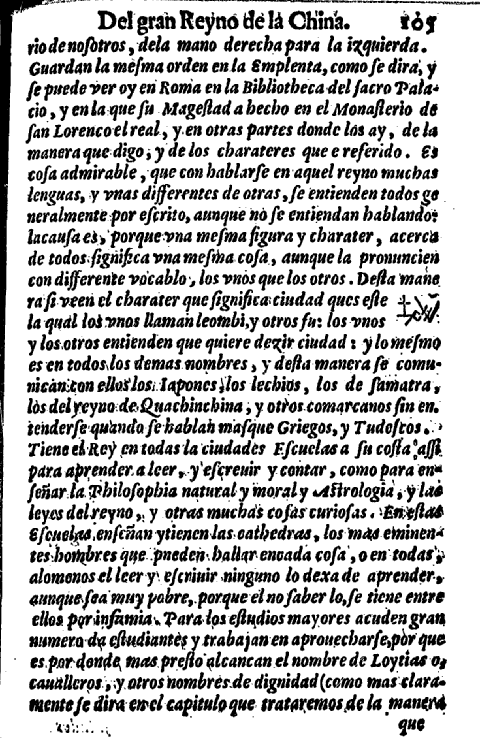
The work by the Mexico-based Augustinian Juan González de Mendoza may have been the first book published in Europe (1585) containing (an attempt at a reproduction of) Chinese characters. Here, apparently, Mendoza tries to draw the character 城 ("city").

Chinese-Mexican contacts date to the early days of the Spanish Colonial Empire in the Americas and the Philippines. In the 16th-17th century, people, goods, and news traveling between China and Spain usually did so through the Philippines (where there was a large Chinese settlement) and (via the Manila galleon trade) to Mexico. The first two galleons loaded with Chinese goods arrived from the Philippines to Acapulco in 1573.

Of particular significance for the trade between the Spanish Colonial Empire and Ming and Qing China were the so-called "Spanish dollars", fine silver coins many of which were minted in Mexico from Mexican silver. Even after Mexican independence, and, later, the Spain's loss of the Philippines, Mexican dollars remained important for China's monetary system. During the late Qing, they became the standard relative to which the silver coins that China's provincial mints started to produce were to be valued.

This historic connection between the two countries is attested by two important early Spanish-language books (soon translated to Europe's other major languages) that were authored by Spanish ecclesiastics stationed in Mexico: Juan González de Mendoza's The history of the great and mighty kingdom of China and the situation thereof (1585) and Juan de Palafox y Mendoza's The History of the Conquest of China by the Tartars (posthumously published in 1670).

In December 1899, Imperial China and Mexico formally established diplomatic relations after signing a Treaty of Amity, Commerce and Navigation between the two nations. In 1904, Mexico opened its first diplomatic mission in Beijing and maintained a diplomatic mission in several cities where it was forced to move (Nanjing and Shanghai) during various wars and instability until the mission was finally closed due to the Japanese invasion of China in 1941. In 1942, Mexico re-opened a diplomatic mission in the city of Chongqing and in 1943 diplomatic missions between the two nations were elevated to embassies.

In 1971, Mexico decided to break formal diplomatic relations with the Republic of China (Taiwan) after the successful passing of Resolution 2758 at the United Nations recognizing the People's Republic of China as the only legitimate representative of China to the United Nations. In February 1972, the People's Republic of China and Mexico established diplomatic relations. In 1973, Mexican President Luis Echeverría paid an official visit to China and met with Chinese Communist Party chairman Mao Zedong.

=== 2009 swine flu dispute ===
In 2009, in the wake of fears of a worldwide swine flu pandemic, thought to have started in Mexico, relations between the two countries cooled substantially over China's decision to quarantine some seventy Mexican citizens, despite none of them showing symptoms of the virus. The Mexican government responded with outrage and, although China imposed the same measures on four nationals from the United States and more than twenty from Canada; dubbed the act discriminatory. Mexican Foreign Minister Patricia Espinosa used such terms as "unacceptable" and "without foundation", and advised compatriots not to travel to China.

Despite this, a mutual desire to increase bilateral trade and increase shipping of Mexican raw materials into China suggested that diplomatic tensions would be only temporary. "This should not affect the relationship in the medium-term because we are talking about an overreaction on both sides", said Enrique Dussel, an expert on Mexican-Chinese trade at the National Autonomous University of Mexico in Mexico City.

=== Post-2016 United States presidential election ===
After the election of Donald Trump, China and Mexico pledged to deepen their diplomatic ties. On 12 December 2016, Chinese State Councillor Yang Jiechi met with Mexican Foreign Minister Claudia Ruiz Massieu to discuss improving transportation and trade between their countries. In July 2019, Mexican Foreign Minister Marcelo Ebrard paid a visit to China to give renewed impetus to trade and investment between both countries.

=== Relations in the 2020s ===
In 2021, Mexican President Andrés Manuel López Obrador apologized for his country's role in the Torreón massacre where more than 300 Chinese Mexicans were massacred in 1911 in the northern city of Torreón during an unprovoked act of racism towards Mexico's Asian community.

In June 2022, both nations celebrated 50 years of diplomatic relations. In November 2023, President López Obrador and President Xi held a meeting during the APEC Summit in San Francisco. In August 2025, Mexico announced that it plans to increase tariffs on imports from China. In September 2025, China opened an anti-dumping investigation into Mexican pecans in retaliation. In December 2025, Mexico approved tariff increases on a range of Chinese products.

In September 2026, Mexican Foreign Secretary, Roberto Velasco Álvarez, paid a visit to China and met with his counterpart Foreign Minister Wang Yi. During the visit, Foreign Secretary Velasco Álvarez inaugurated Mexico's new consulate in Chongqing. In November 2026, Mexican President Claudia Sheinbaum traveled to Shenzhen, China to attend the APEC summit. While there, she met with President Xi. During the meeting, she told Xi that Mexico was interested in expanding cooperation with China on technology, agriculture, water resources, health and tourism, while Xi said the two countries should "treat each other with sincerity, deepen political mutual trust".

== High-level visits ==
Mexican President Claudia Sheinbaum and Chinese President Xi Jinping at the APEC summit in Shenzhen, China; November 2026.

CCP General Secretary, President and Premier visits from China to Mexico

- Premier Zhao Ziyang (1981)
- President Yang Shangkun (1990)
- Premier Li Peng (1995)
- President Jiang Zemin (1997, 2002)
- Premier Wen Jiabao (2003)
- President Hu Jintao (2005, 2012)
- President Xi Jinping (2013)

Presidential visits from Mexico to China

- President Luis Echeverría Álvarez (1973)
- President José López Portillo (1978)
- President Miguel de la Madrid (1986)
- President Carlos Salinas de Gortari (1993)
- President Ernesto Zedillo (1996)
- President Vicente Fox (June & October 2001)
- President Felipe Calderón (2008)
- President Enrique Peña Nieto (2013, 2014, 2016, 2017)
- President Claudia Sheinbaum (2026)

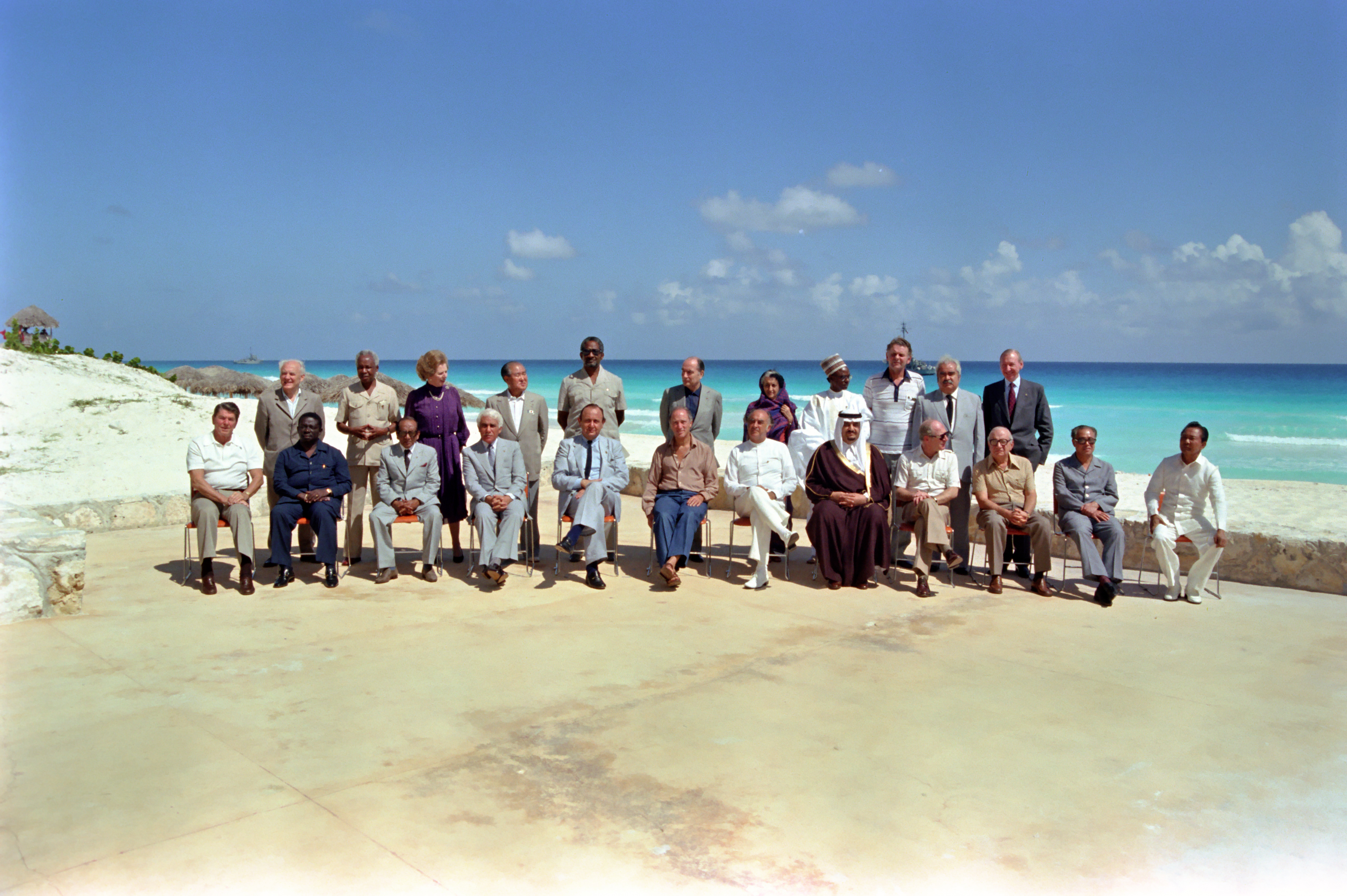
President José López Portillo and Premier Zhao Ziyang attending the North–South Summit in Cancún; October 1981.

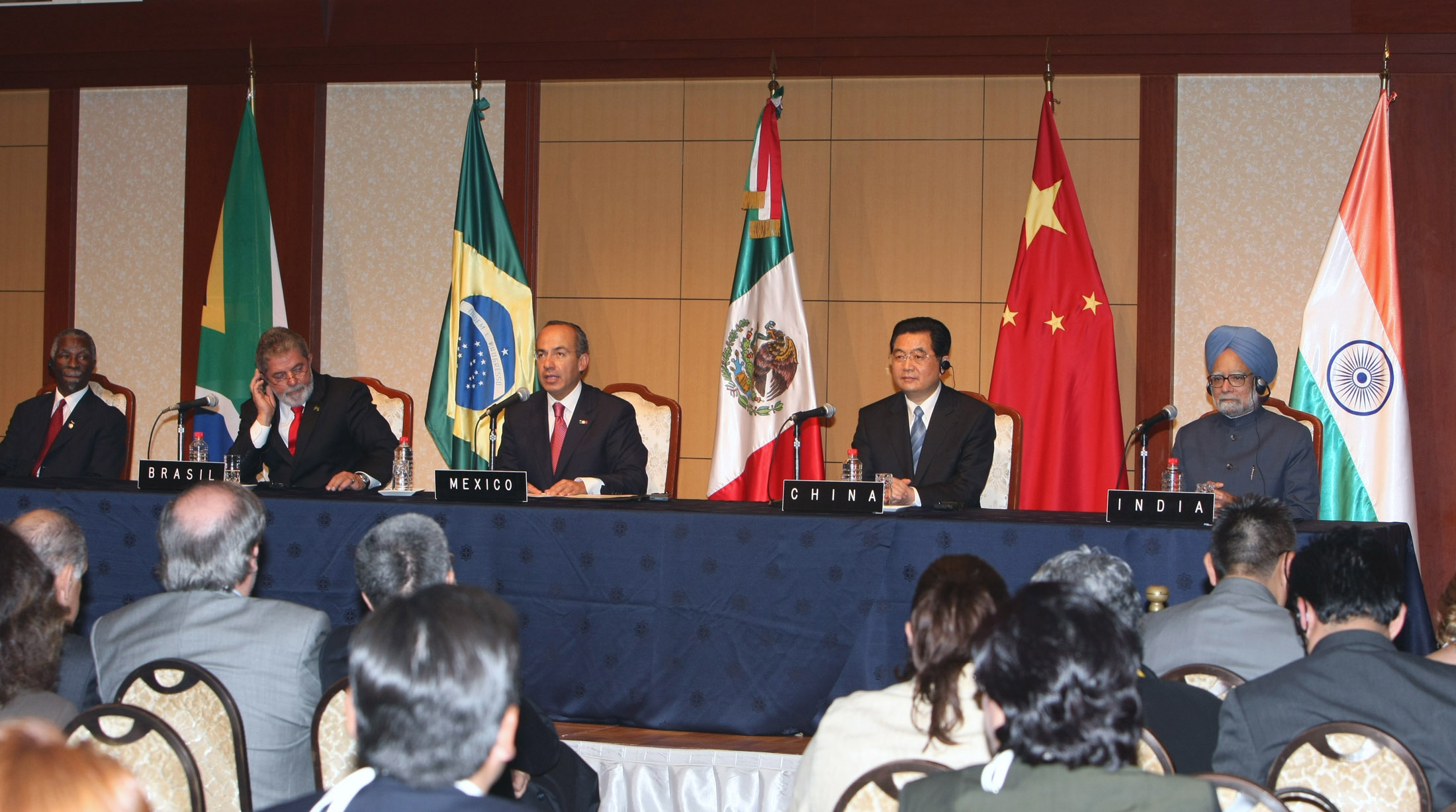
President Felipe Calderón and President Hu Jintao (along with other leaders) speaking during the G-8 Summit at Sapporo, Japan; July 2008.

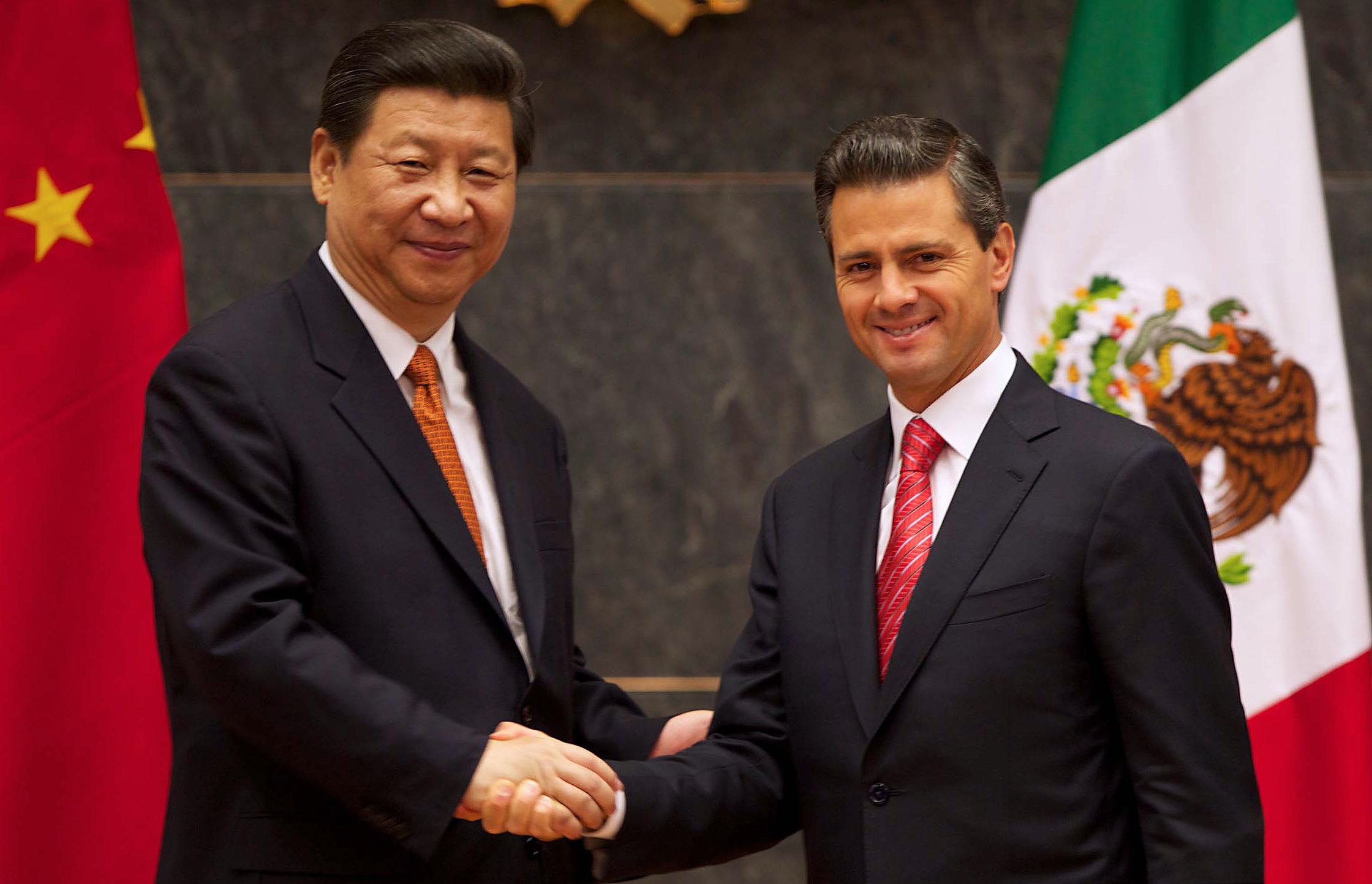
President Enrique Peña Nieto and President Xi Jinping in Mexico City; June 2013.

== Academic connections ==
The National Autonomous University of Mexico has established a Center for Chinese-Mexican Studies in the faculty of economics, aimed at increasing the understanding of China and its relationship to Mexico. The center hosts conferences and publishes reports, among other activities. The university also has an academic office located at the Beijing Foreign Studies University.

== Bilateral agreements ==
Both nations have signed numerous bilateral agreements such as an Agreement on Trade (1973); Agreement on Tourism Cooperation (1978); Agreement on Cultural Exchanges (1978); Consular Agreement (1986); Agreement on Technical and Scientific Cooperation (1989); Agreement on Air Transportation (2004); Agreement on Mutual Legal Assistance in Criminal Matters (2005); Agreement on Maritime Transport (2005); Agreement to Avoid Double Taxation and Prevent Tax Evasion in Income Taxes (2005); Agreement on Trade Remedy Measures (2008); Agreement for the Promotion and Reciprocal Protection of Investments (2008); Extradition Treaty (2008); Agreement for Recognition of Studies, Titles and Academic Degrees (2010); Agreement in Matters of Protection, Preservation, Return and Restitution of Cultural Property and Prevention of Theft, Clandestine Excavation and Illicit Import and Export of Cultural Property (2012); Agreement of Mutual Administrative Assistance in Customs Matters (2012); Memorandum of Understanding between the Mexican Secretariat of Foreign Affairs and the Chinese Ministry of Science and Technology on Strengthening Cooperation in Advanced and New Technology and its Industrialization (2014); Agreement of Cooperation in Joint call on Research Projects on Science and Technology (2014); Memorandum of Understanding and Cooperation between the China National Petroleum Corporation and Pemex (2014); Memorandum of Understanding between the Mexican Secretariat of Economy and the Chinese National Development and Reform Commission for the Promotion of Investment and Industrial Cooperation (2014); Memorandum of Understanding on the Traceability of Tequila (2015); Memorandum of Understanding on Agricultural Cooperation (2015); Memorandum of Understanding for Electronic Exchange of Import and Export Certificates of Agricultural, Aquaculture and Fishing Goods (2015); Agreement for the Protocol of Phytosanitary Requirements for the Export of Maize (2015); Agreement for the Inspection, Quarantine and Veterinary Health Conditions to Export Frozen Bovine Meat (2015) and a Memorandum of Understanding on Cooperation in Industrial Property Matters (2015) (among others).

== Tourism and travel ==
In 2019, approximately 170,000 Chinese citizens visited Mexico for tourism. There are commercial flights between both nations with China Southern Airlines and Hainan Airlines. Several airlines offer direct cargo services between both nations.

== Trade ==
China is Mexico's second largest trading partner globally. As a result of nearshoring China has invested heavily in Mexico to take advantage of Mexico's geographic proximity and free trade agreement with the United States through USMCA. In 2023, two-way trade between both nations amounted to US$123 billion (not including trade with Hong Kong or Macao). From January 1999 to December 2023, Mexico has received a total of US$2.5 billion in Chinese foreign direct investments.

== Taiwan ==
Mexico considers Taiwan to be "an inseparable part" of China and considers Tibet to be China's internal affairs. There are over 80 united front organizations operating in Mexico, some of which issue statements against elements of Taiwan–United States relations.

== Hong Kong ==
Hong Kong–Mexico relations
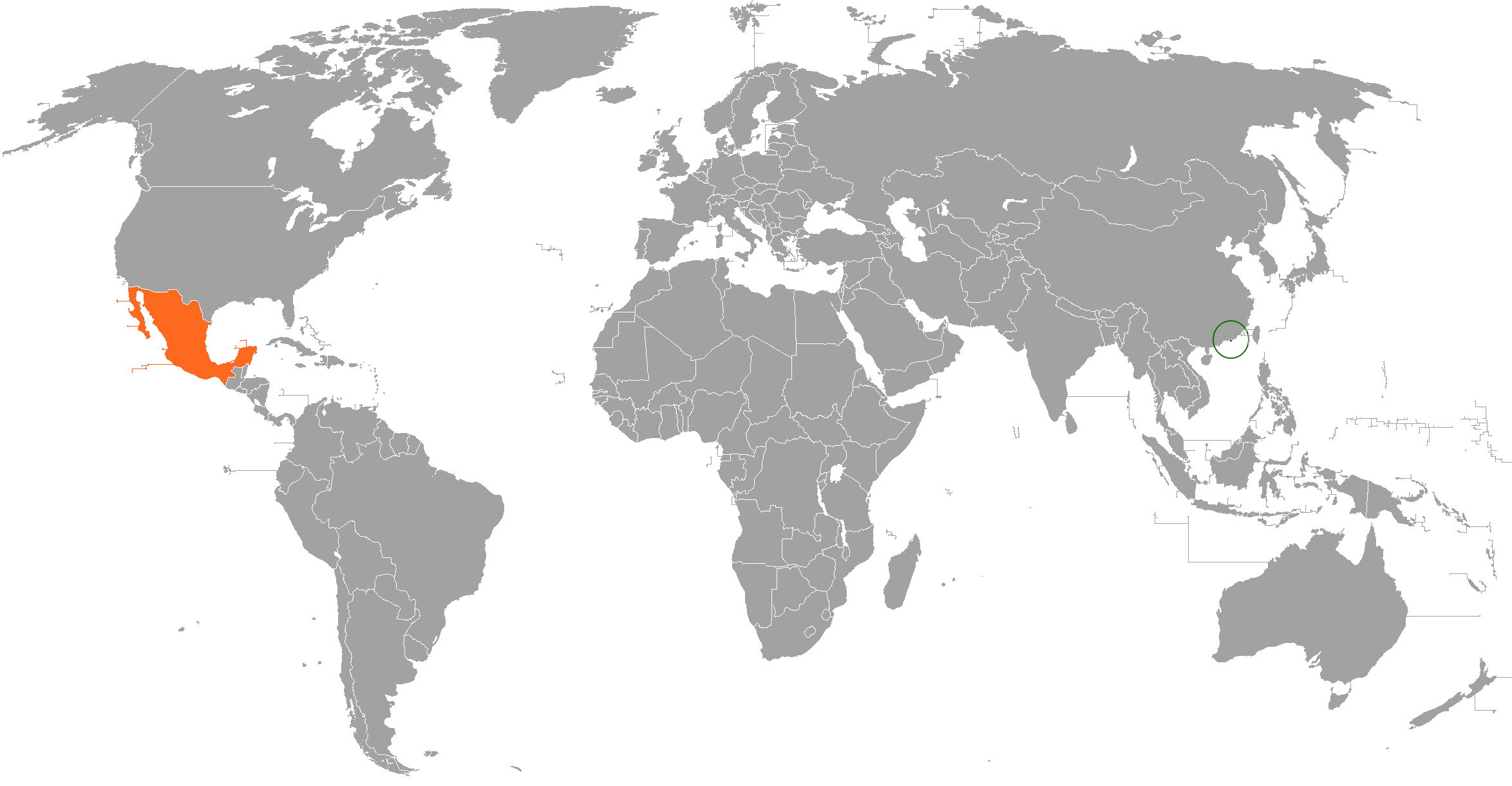

- Hong Kong: Mexico

While Mexico was part of the Spanish Empire, trade between Spain and China would traverse Mexico with the Manila galleon. Ships laden with goods from Mexico would make call primarily in Macau, where trade with nearby ports, including Hong Kong, may have occurred. Those goods would then return to Mexico, before being transferred onwards to Spain.

In 1962, Mexican President Adolfo Lopez Mateos stopped on an overnight visit to Hong Kong (a British colony at the time) and was met by representatives of the local government. In 1966, Mexico opened a consulate-general in Hong Kong.

In October 2002, Hong Kong's Chief Executive, Tung Chee-hwa, paid a visit to Mexico to attend the APEC Summit in Los Cabos. In April 2013, Mexican President Enrique Peña Nieto paid a visit to Hong Kong, the first visit by a Mexican head of state to the special administrative region. During his visit, President Peña Nieto met with Chief Executive Leung Chun-ying and discussed increasing trade between Mexico and Hong Kong. President Peña Nieto also met with businessmen and monetary and financial authorities of the city. In August 2015, Hong Kong's Secretary for Commerce and Economic Development, Gregory So, paid a visit to Mexico.

=== Bilateral agreements ===
Mexico and Hong Kong have signed a few bilateral agreements, such as an Agreement for the Suppression of visas for holders of Ordinary Passports (2004); Agreement on Air Transportation (2006); Agreement to Avoid Double Taxation and Prevent Tax Evasion with respect to Income Taxes (2012); and an Agreement for the Promotion and Reciprocal Protection of Investments (2020).

=== Trade relations ===
In 2023, two-way trade between Mexico and Hong Kong amounted to US$1.6 billion. Hong Kong's main exports products include: electronic integrated circuits and various other electronic equipment; motor vehicles, aluminum, iron and steel products, chemical based products, clothing, jewelry, and food based products. Mexico's main export products include: telephones and mobile phones, electronic integrated circuits, beef and fish, minerals, motor vehicles, scrap metals, clothing, and vegetables.

== Macau ==
Macau–Mexico relations
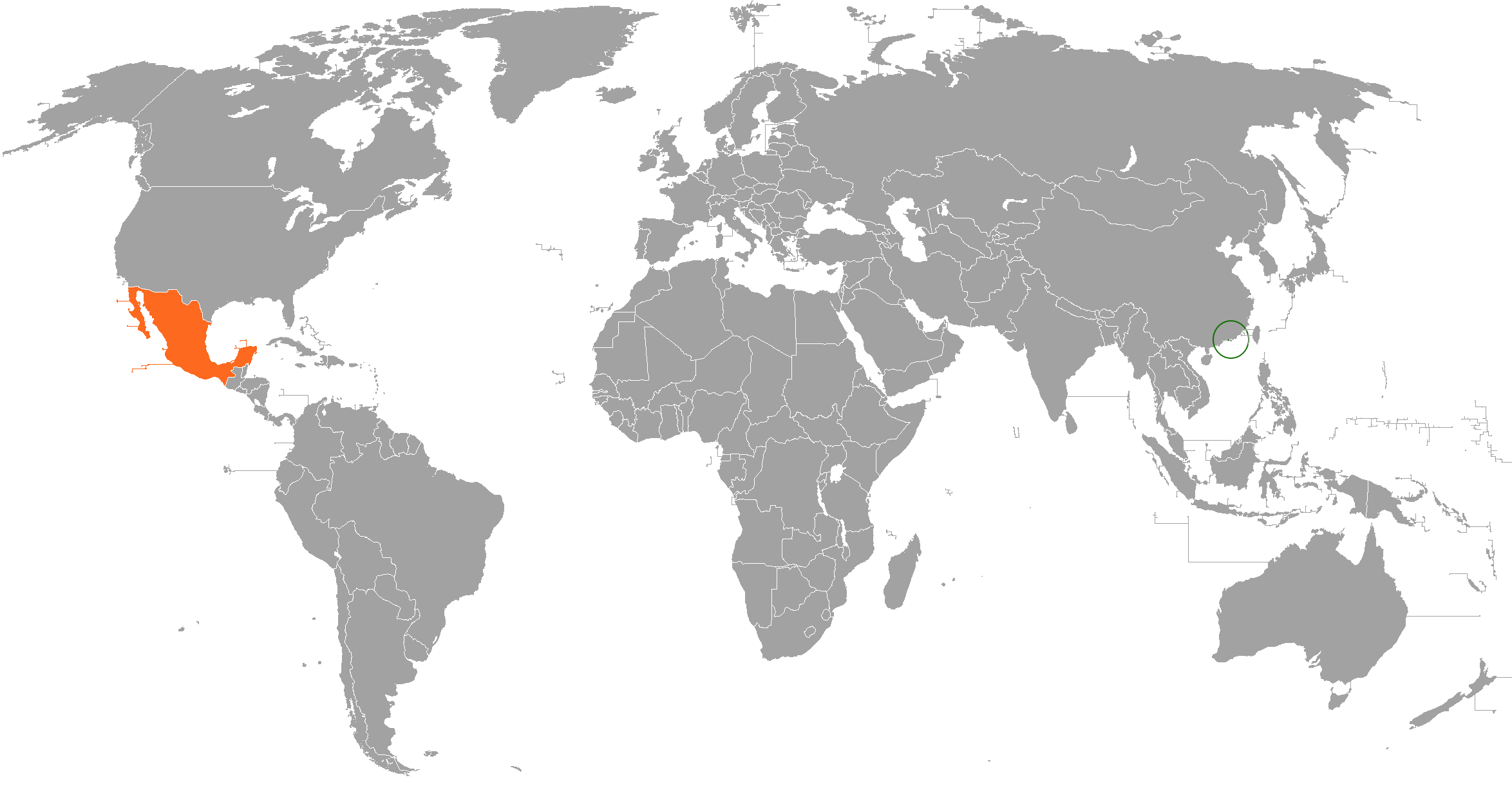

- Macau: Mexico

First contact between Mexico and Macau took place when ships from the Manila galleon would visit the port of Portuguese Macau. Soon after the Torreón massacre and the expulsion of Chinese Mexican men (accompanied by their Mexican born wives and children) in the 1930s from northern Mexican states of Sonora and Sinaloa; many from the community were sent to Guangdong Province before settling in Macau which appeared familiar to many Chinese Mexicans as the territory was administered by the Portuguese and the Portuguese language was similar to Spanish, as well as the predominant Catholic religion in the territory. It would be at least 30 years before those expelled would be allowed to return to Mexico.

The consulate-general of Mexico in Hong Kong maintains a presence periodically in Macau and there are channels for dialogue with local authorities.

=== Bilateral agreements ===
Since 2008, Mexico and Macau have had an Agreement for the Elimination of Visas for holders of Ordinary Passports.

=== Trade relations ===
In 2023, two-way trade between Macau and Mexico amounted to US$26.7 million. Macau's main exports products include: electrical parts, parts and accessories for motor vehicles, plastic, clothing, and antibiotics. Mexico's main exports products include: telephones including mobile phones and video game consoles.

== Public opinion ==
A survey published in 2026 by the Pew Research Center found that 59% of Mexicans had a favorable view of China, while 28% had an unfavorable view. It also found that 70% of Mexicans people in the 18-35 age group had positive opinions of China.

== Resident diplomatic missions ==
of China in Mexico

- Mexico City (Embassy)
- Tijuana (Consulate-General)

of Mexico in China

- Beijing (Embassy)
- Chongqing (Consulate)
- Guangzhou (Consulate-General)
- Hong Kong (Consulate-General)
- Shanghai (Consulate-General)

Embassy of China in Mexico City
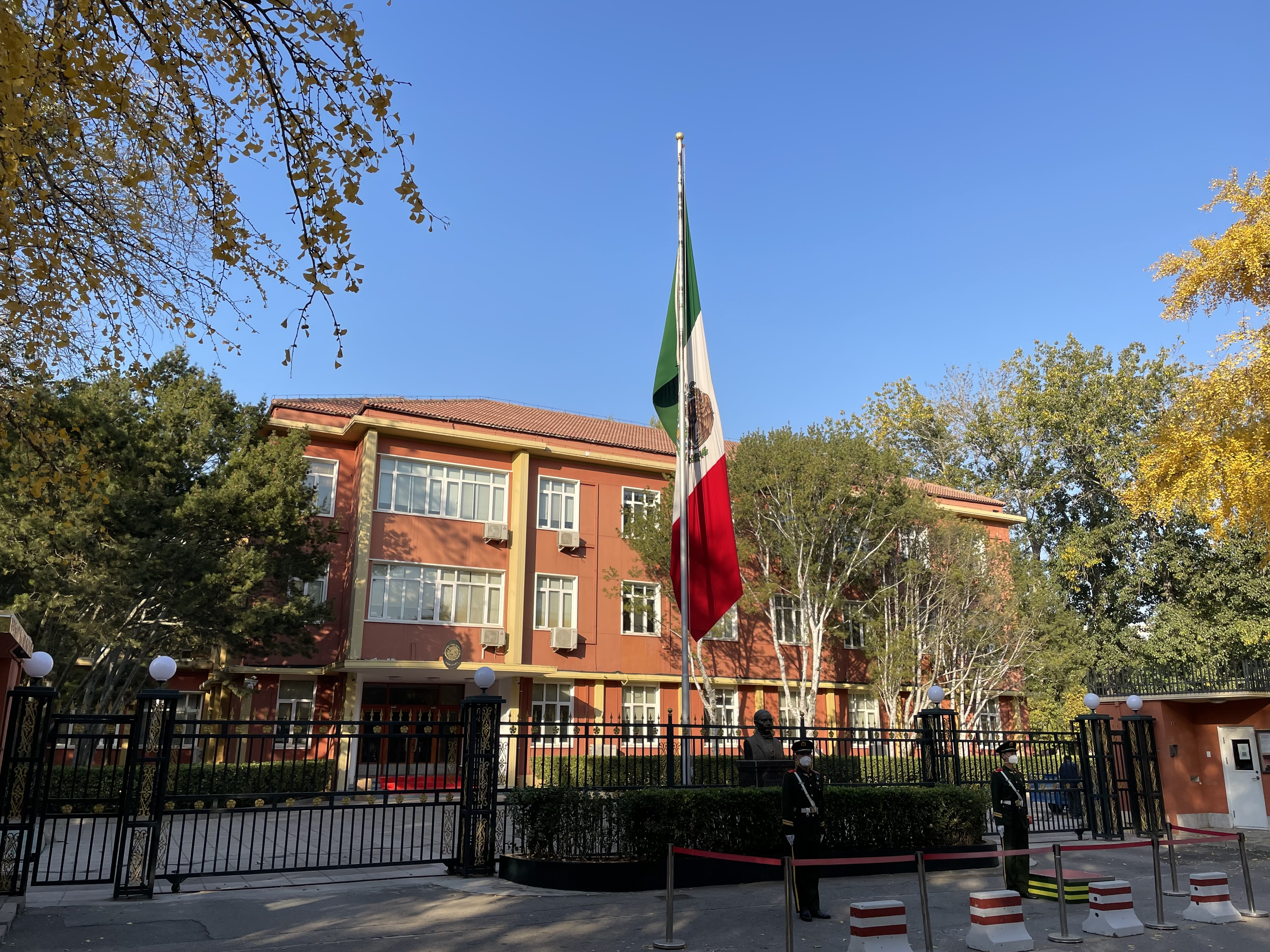
Embassy of Mexico in Beijing

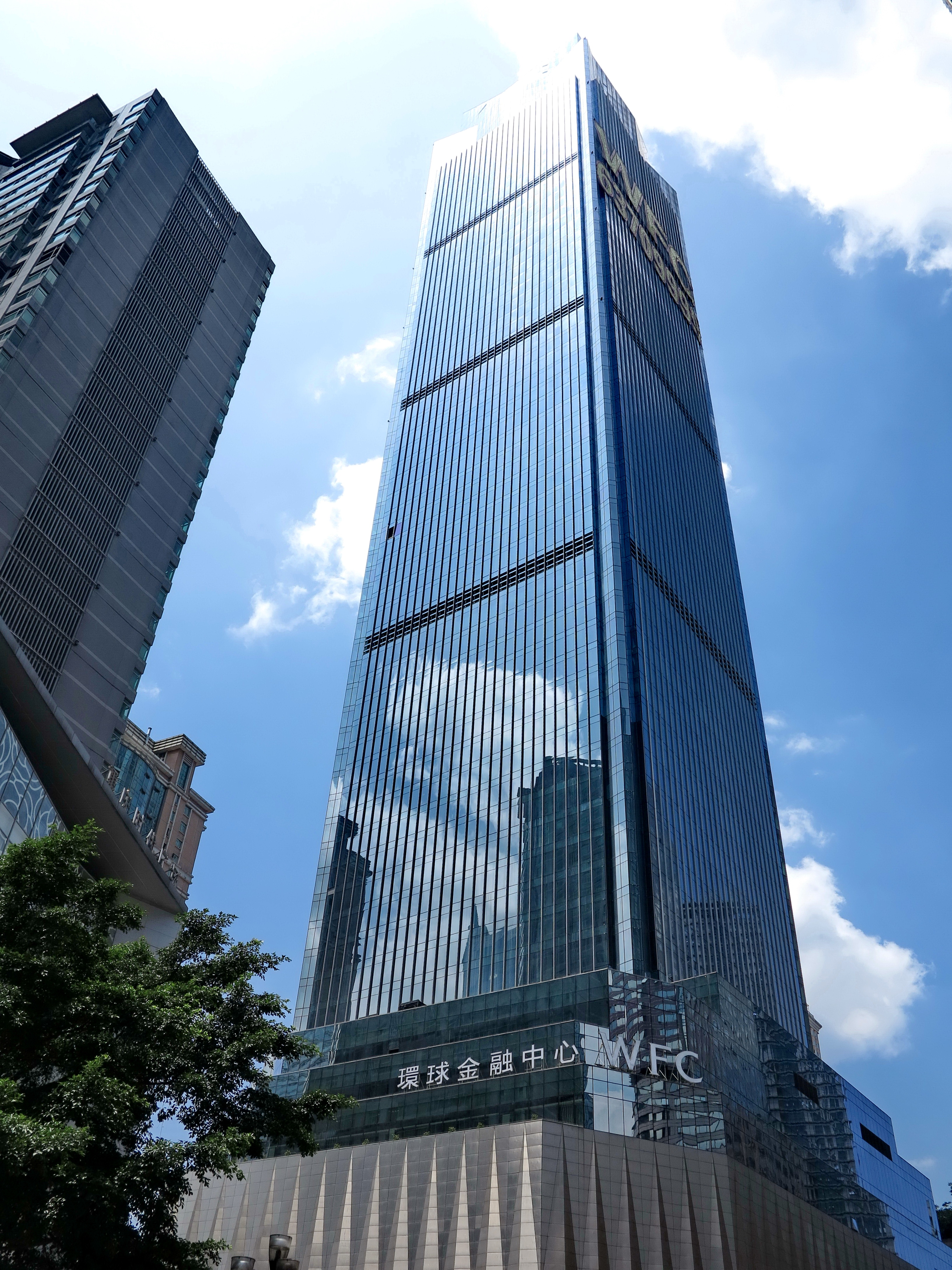
World Financial Center hosting the Consulate of Mexico in Chongqing

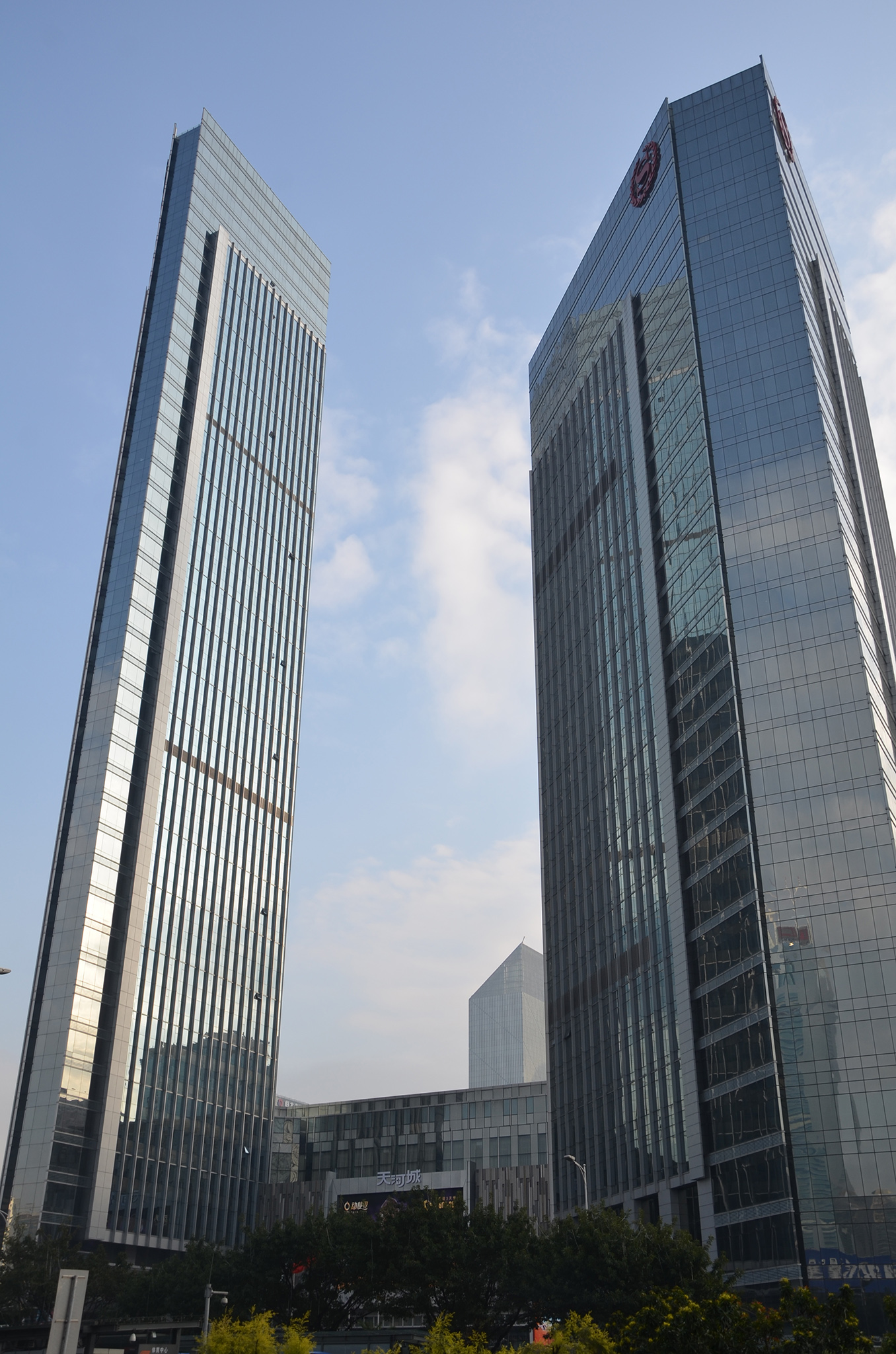
Teem Plaza hosting the Consulate-General of Mexico in Guangzhou

Hopewell Centre hosting the Consulate-General of Mexico in Hong Kong

== Gallery ==
The ARM Cuauhtémoc in Shanghai

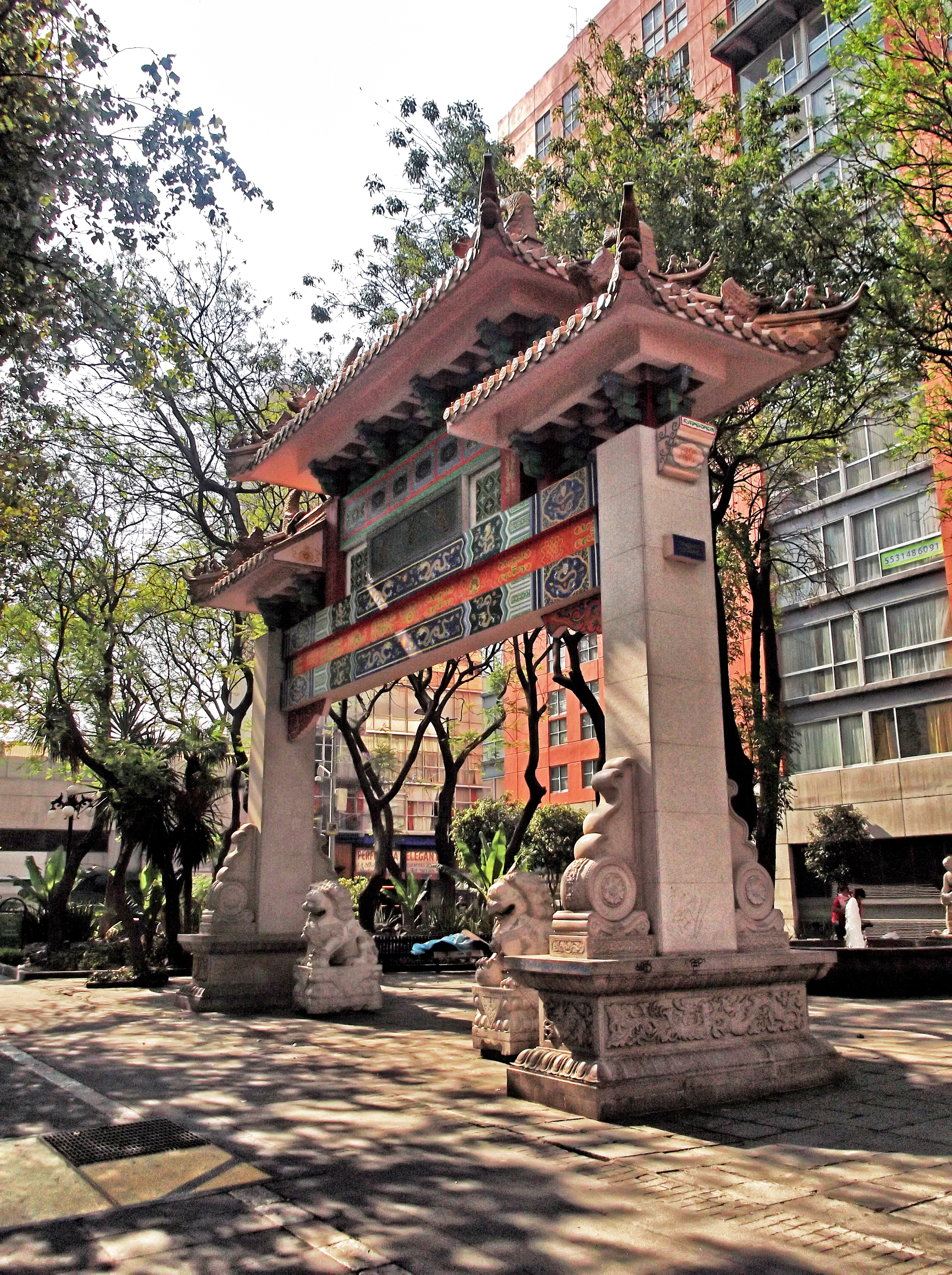
Chinese Arch in Mexico City's Barrio Chino (Chinatown)

Mexico Pavilion at Expo 2010 in Shanghai

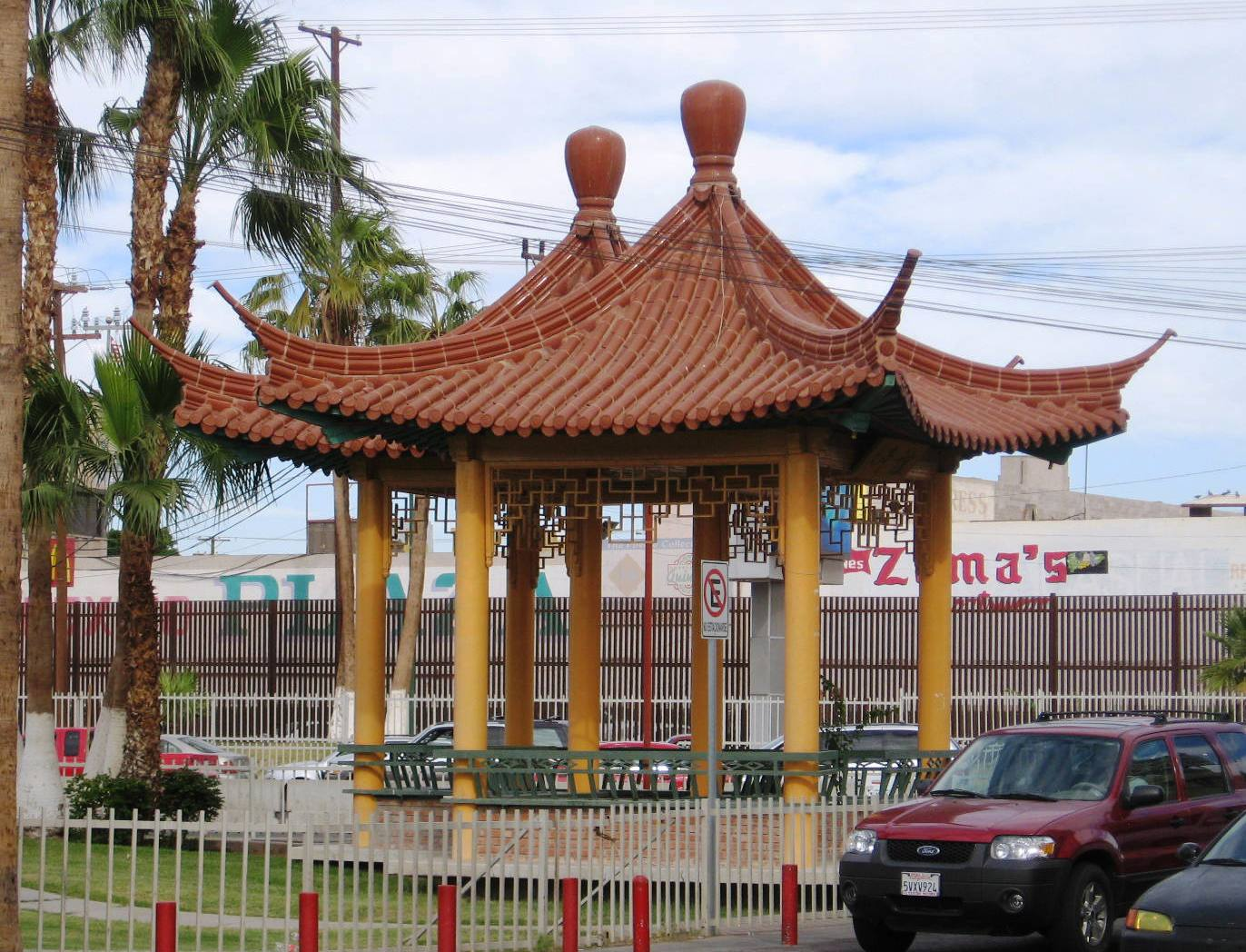
Chinese Pagoda in La Chinesca, Mexicali

== See also ==
- Chinese immigration to Mexico
- Embassy of Mexico, Beijing
- Mexico–Taiwan relations
- Torreón massacre
