= China–Guatemala relations =

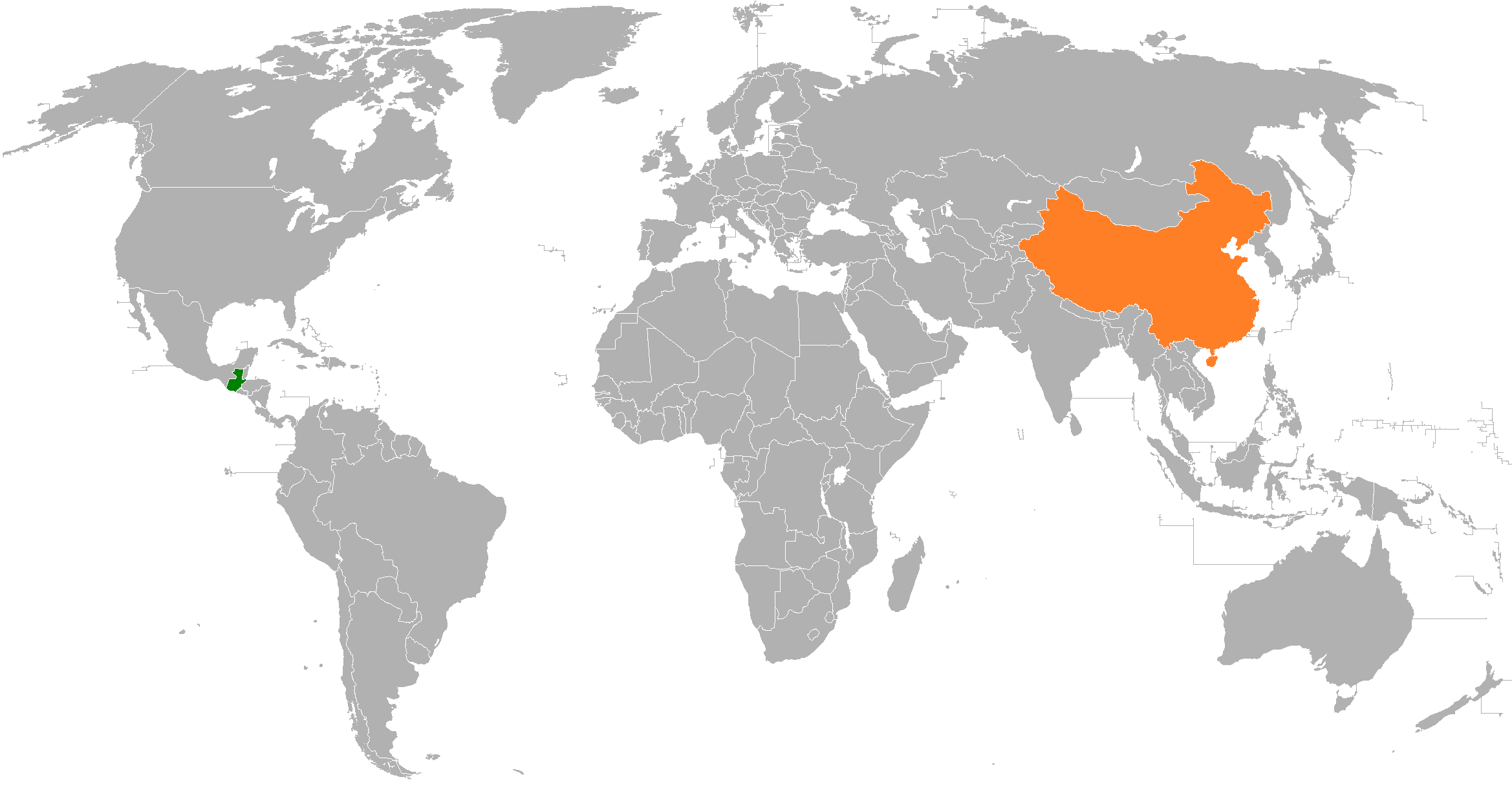
- China: Guatemala

China–Guatemala relations refers to the bilateral relations between the People's Republic of China (PRC) and the Republic of Guatemala.

The two countries have never established diplomatic relations, nor have they established representative offices with embassy functions in each other's capital. Guatemala has had diplomatic relations with the Republic of China (ROC) since 1933. Currently, the People's Republic of China's affairs with Guatemala are also handled by the Embassy of the People's Republic of China in Costa Rica.

== History ==
In 1952, the Guatemalan government sent a delegation to attend the Asia and Pacific Rim Peace Conference held in Beijing.

In January 1997, China used its veto power in the UN Security Council to oppose the UN sending 155 military observers to Guatemala, as the Guatemalan government had supported the Republic of China's accession to the United Nations for four consecutive years.

China's UN representative Qin Huasun issued a condemnation statement at the General Assembly:

It is regrettable that for four consecutive years, the Guatemalan government has ignored China's repeated admonitions, openly violated the purposes and principles of the UN Charter, and tried its best to support activities to split China in the UN. What's more, the Guatemalan government, despite the Chinese government's solemn admonitions, insisted on inviting the Taiwan authorities to participate in the signing ceremony of the peace agreement in Guatemala, providing a venue for them to engage in activities to split China. The Guatemalan authorities cannot expect to ask China to cooperate with them in the Security Council on the one hand, and do things that undermine China's sovereignty and territorial integrity on the other.

On January 9, 2015, Guatemalan Foreign Minister Carlos Raúl Morales led a delegation to attend the first ministerial meeting of the China-CELAC Forum held in Beijing. From January 21 to 22, 2018, the Guatemalan Deputy Foreign Minister led a delegation to attend the second ministerial meeting of the China-CELAC Forum held in Santiago, Chile.

During the COVID-19 pandemic, Guatemalan President Alejandro Giammattei claimed that the People's Republic of China was interested in providing Guatemala with COVID-19 vaccines and hoped that Guatemala would sever diplomatic ties with the Republic of China, but was rejected.

The People's Republic of China's affairs concerning Guatemala were previously handled by its embassy in Mexico. After China and Costa Rica established diplomatic relations in 2007, the embassy in Costa Rica took over the responsibility.

In April 2025, Guatemala confirmed that its Ministry of Foreign Affairs was attacked in 2022 by Chinese state-backed advanced persistent threat group APT15.

== Economic relations ==
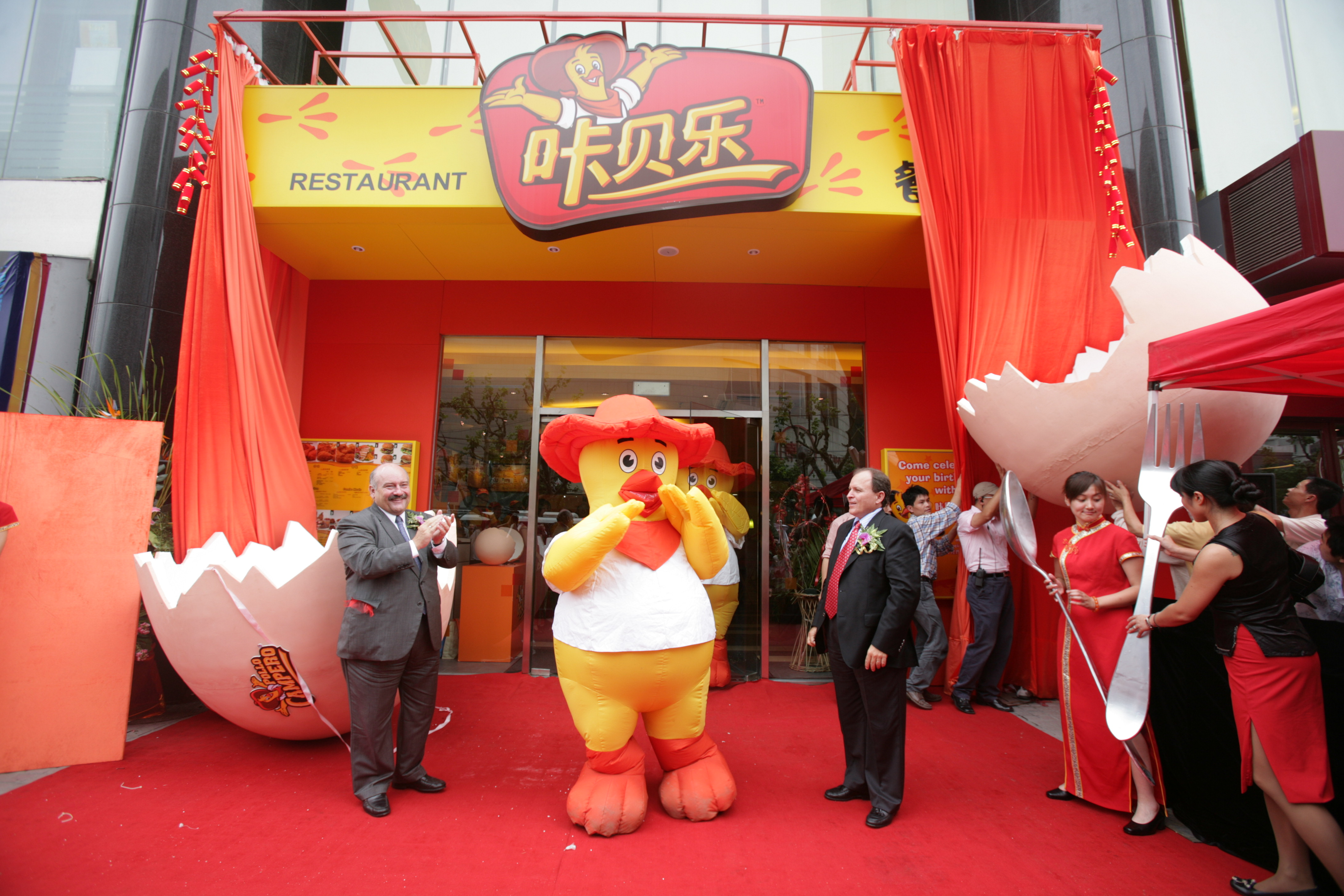
Opening of the Pollo Campero Shanghai

In 2007, Guatemalan restaurant group Cabernet opened its first branch in China in Shanghai, but it closed in 2009.

As of 2022, China is Guatemala's second-biggest importer, after the United States.

On May 24, 2024, Guatemalan President Bernardo Arévalo stated that China had refused entry to some goods from Guatemala, speculating that this might be related to the diplomatic relations between Guatemala and Taiwan.

== Cultural relations ==
Despite the lack of diplomatic relations, the two countries still have some cultural exchanges. In 1956, Guatemalan writer Miguel Angel Asturias traveled to China to participate in the 20th anniversary of Lu Xun's death. In 2010, Guatemala participated in the 2010 Shanghai World Expo and exhibited in the Central and South American Pavilion.
