= Embassy of Mexico, Beijing =

Embassy of Mexico in China
- Embajada de México en China

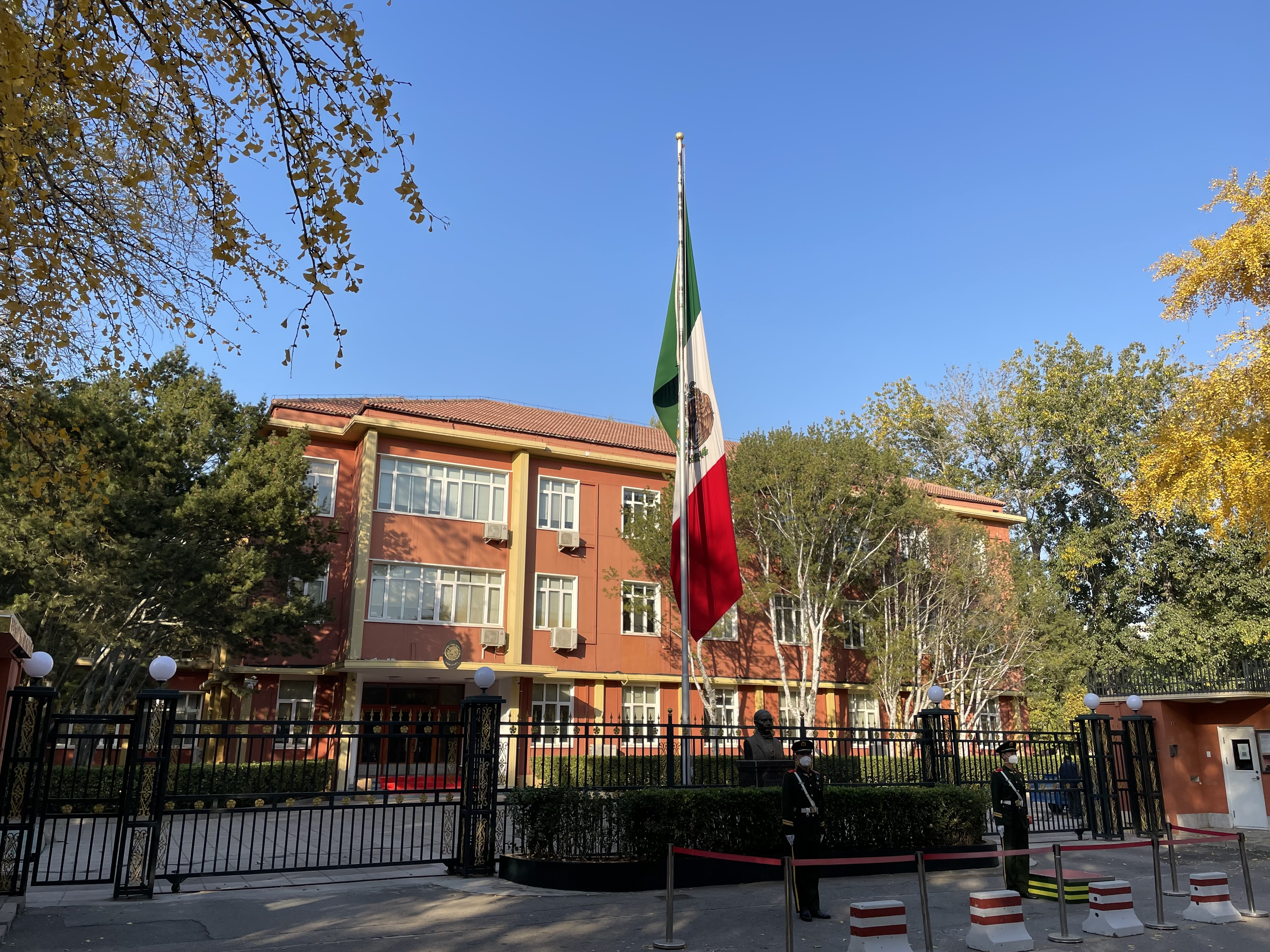
- Incumbent; Jesús Seade since 8 October 2021
- Style: Excellency
- Type: Diplomatic mission
- Status: Active
- Reports to: Secretariat of Foreign Affairs; President of Mexico
- Seat: Sanlitun Dong Wu Jie 5 Chaoyang, Beijing
- Appointer: President of Mexico with Senate advice and consent
- Term length: No set term length
- Formation: 1904
- First holder: Carlos Américo Lera
- Website: embamex.sre.gob.mx/china

The Embassy of Mexico in China, based out of Beijing, is the primary diplomatic mission from the United Mexican States to the People's Republic of China.

== Location ==
The chancery for the Embassy is located at Sanlitun Dong Wu Jie 5, Chaoyang in Beijing. Additionally, Mexico maintains a cultural section in order to promote the culture, artistic community and image of Mexico in China.

Mexico also maintains consulates-general in Guangzhou, Hong Kong, Shanghai and a consulate in Chongqing.

== History ==
Mexico and the Qing dynasty first began official diplomatic relations on 14 December 1899 following the signing of the Treaty of Friendship, Commerce and Navigation. Later, Mexico opened its first legation in Beijing in 1904.

Following the 1911 Revolution, the legation was instructed to continue representing the interests of Mexico before the new government. However, due to the instability resulting from the Second Sino-Japanese War and the Chinese Civil War, Mexico was forced to relocated its legation multiple times. First, to Nanjing, the capital of the Republic of China, then to Shanghai. Following Japan's invasion in 1941, Mexico was forced to close its legation in Shanghai.

In 1942, Mexico reopened its legation in the city of Chongqing, the provisional home of the Republic of China, and in 1943 diplomatic missions between the two nations were elevated to that of embassies. In 1945 General Heliodoro Escalante presented his credentials to President Chiang Kai-shek as Mexico's first ambassador to China. From 1949 to 1971 Mexico maintained relations with the Republic of China, even after its defeat in the Chinese Civil War. However, Mexico did not formally establish an embassy in the Republic of China, instead allowing its ambassador in Japan to act concurrently in China.

In November 1971, following the passage of United Nations General Assembly Resolution 2758, Mexico decided to break off relations with the Republic of China as the People's Republic of China was recognized as the only legitimate representative of China to the United Nations. Subsequently, on 14 February 1972 Mexico and the People's Republic of China formally established diplomatic relations. As part of this agreement, both countries agreed to the installation of diplomatic representations at the ambassador level in their respective capitals. Mexico opened its first embassy in Beijing in May 1972, with its first ambassador, Eugenio Anguiano Roch, presenting his credentials to the Chinese government on 9 August 1972. Since the establishment of relations between the two countries, every Mexican president has paid China an official state visit, beginning with Luis Echeverría in 1973.

== Ambassadors ==
The following is the list of Mexican Ambassadors to China since 1972, the year Mexico recognized the People's Republic of China as the sole representative of the Chinese people:

Ambassador	Term	President
Eugenio Anguiano Roch	1972–1976	Luis Echeverría
Omar Martínez Legorreta	1976–1978	Luis Echeverría; José López Portillo y Pacheco
Víctor Manzanilla Schaffer	1980–1982	José López Portillo y Pacheco
Eugenio Anguiano Roch	1982–1987	José López Portillo y Pacheco; Miguel de la Madrid
Fausto Zapata Loredo	1987–1988	Miguel de la Madrid
Jorge Eduardo Navarrete López	1989–1993	Carlos Salinas de Gortari
Victor Manuel Rodríguez Arriaga	1993–1994	Carlos Salinas de Gortari; Ernesto Zedillo
Luis Wybo Alfaro	1995–1999	Ernesto Zedillo
Cecilio Garza Limón	1999–2001	Ernesto Zedillo; Vicente Fox
Ismael Sergio Ley López	2001–2006	Vicente Fox
Jorge Eugenio Guajardo González	2007–2013	Felipe Calderón
Julián Ventura Valero	2013–2017	Enrique Peña Nieto
José Luis Bernal Rodríguez	2017–2021	Enrique Peña Nieto; Andrés Manuel López Obrador
Jesús Seade	2021–Present	Andrés Manuel López Obrador

== See also ==
- China–Mexico relations
- Foreign relations of Mexico
- List of diplomatic missions of Mexico
