= Chinese regional industrial capacity investment funds =

The Sino–Latin American Production Capacity Cooperation Investment Fund (Claifund) and the China-Africa Industrial Capacity Cooperation Fund (CAICCF) are Chinese state-backed regional investment funds established in 2015 to support overseas industrial capacity cooperation in Latin America and Africa. They provide medium- and long-term capital for projects in manufacturing, infrastructure, energy, agriculture, and high-technology sectors.

Claifund focuses on Latin America and the Caribbean, while CAICCF targets Africa. Both were launched with initial capitalization of around US$10 billion each, primarily funded by Chinese policy financial institutions and foreign exchange reserves.

As major shareholders, the State Administration of Foreign Exchange set up CAICCF with Export–Import Bank of China and Claifund with China Development Bank. In 2019, both funds were consolidated under Siyuan Investment Co., Ltd., established by SAFE, giving them a shared board-level management team while maintaining separate regional mandates.

== CAICCF investments ==
CAICCF has invested over US$2 billion in 25 projects across countries including Egypt, Ghana, the Democratic Republic of the Congo, Ethiopia, South Africa, and Angola. Representative investments include partnerships with Transsion Holdings to develop digital technology in Africa and Jushi Egypt Fiberglass Co., Ltd. to upgrade the manufacturing industry.

== Claifund investments ==
The fund acquired a 33% stake in Duke Energy International Brazil Holdings, which controls multiple hydroelectric facilities in Brazil, in a transaction valued at about US$315 million.

Claifund serves as China's primary partner in the China–Brazil Fund, jointly working with BNDES to identify and support industrial and infrastructure projects in Brazil.
