= Islam and music =

Since the early Islamic era, there has been extensive debate across the Muslim world with regard to the nature and permissibility of music from the perspective of Islam. Many Islamic scholars believe that the Quran and sunnah (the sayings and lifestyle of Muhammad) prohibit creating or indulging in any form of music and associated arts, such as dancing; while others have asserted that some specific musical traditions are permissible. Nevertheless, music has thrived in the Muslim world, although it was historically often confined to palaces and private homes to avoid censure as prescribed by Islamic law.

In many parts of the Muslim world, devotional/religious music and secular music is well developed. In recent decades, "the advent of a whole new generation of Muslim musicians who try to blend their work and faith" has given the issue "extra significance" in Islamic discourse.

Islamic art and music flourished greatly during the Islamic Golden Age in the Abbasid Caliphate, and continued to flourish until the 19th century in the Ottoman, Safavid, and Mughal empires. Ottoman music in particular developed into a diverse art form and influenced Western composers of the Classical period. More broadly, Islamic musical traditions are also credited with influencing modern music in the Western world. For example, French musicologist Rodolphe François, in his assessment of the Abbasid Caliphate in Islamic history, cites the Kitab al-Musiqa al-Kabir (Arabic: كِتٰبَ ٱلمُوْسِيقَىٰ ٱلكَبِيرُ; lit. 'The Great Book of Music') by al-Farabi as being influential.

== Music and Islamic law ==
Strictly speaking, the words 'Islamic religious music' present a contradiction in terms. The practice of orthodox Sunni and Shi'a Islam does not involve any activity recognized within Muslim cultures as 'music'. The melodious recitation of the Holy Qur'an and the call to prayer are central to Islam, but generic terms for music have never been applied to them. Instead, specialist designations have been used. However, a wide variety of religious and spiritual genres that use musical instruments exists, usually performed at various public and private assemblies outside the orthodox sphere.

— Eckhard Neubauer, Veronica Doubleday, Islamic religious music, New Grove Dictionary of Music online

The question of whether music is permitted or forbidden in Islam is a matter of continuous debate among scholars. The Qur'an does not specifically refer to music itself. Some scholars, however, have interpreted the phrase "idle talk", which is discouraged, as including music.

Music appears in several hadith in an unfavorable way, with one example being "Singing sprouts hypocrisy in the heart as rain sprouts plants." There is disagreement over the reliability of these narrations. Another hadith reads: "There will be among my Ummah people who will regard as permissible adultery, silk, alcohol and musical instruments." But again, the reliability of this hadith has also been questioned, most notably by Ibn Hazm al-Dhahiri.

One of the earliest accounts of the prohibition of music is in a non-Muslim source: Du Huan, who traveled through the Abbasid Caliphate between 751-762 detailing this in the Jingxingji, a now lost travelogue, but some portions survive in the Tongdian encyclopedia, compiled between 766-801. As such, his account predates both the formal codification of the Islamic legal schools (madhhabs) and the widespread textualization of Hadith literature. Modern historians consider his travelogue to be a highly accurate contemporary account of early Abbasid society, and overall he provides a very accurate account. Among other points on his summary of Islamic law and customs, Du Huan noted:

斷飲酒，禁音樂。

They [Muslims] prohibit wine and music.

— Tongdian,Volume 193

Among the groups that believe the Quran and Islamic tradition "strictly" prohibit music are the Salafi, Wahhabi, and Deobandi denominations.

In his survey of Islamic scholarship on enjoining good and forbidding wrong in accordance with Islamic law, modern Orientalist historian Michael Cook found that

Attacks on offending objects are a ubiquitous theme ... There are, for example, chess-boards to be overturned, supposedly sacred trees to be cut down and decorative images to destroy or deface ... But the targets that are mentioned again and again are liquor and musical instruments. (An exception was sometimes made for tambourines which were used to announce marriages).

Prohibitions of music are rare or non-existent in majority-Muslim states since the coming to power of Muhammad bin Salman in Saudi Arabia, but have often been enforced where Islamist insurgents have gained power, such as in Afghanistan under Taliban rule, and at least as of January 2013, "across much of the two-thirds of Mali ... controlled by Islamic rebel groups".

According to the grand mufti of the Al-Azhar University, there is nothing in the Islamic reports prohibiting music:

the traditions (ahadith) used by those who consider music to be haram, if we accept them to be authentic, their meaning is always qualified (muqayyad) by the fact that they mention that type of music which is accompanied by immoral acts, alcohol consumption, fornication, and other vices. In fact, we do not know of any hadith condemning music that has not mentioned these vices.

and that music was played by the sahaba and Tabi'un:

It has been reported from the Prophet and many of his companions (sahaba), their successors (tabiun), the great leaders of the schools of law and jurisprudence that they used to listen to and attend musical events which were not accompanied by vices or prohibited acts. This is the view held by many of the scholars of Islamic jurisprudence (fuqaha). Their fatwa concluded that listening to musical instruments cannot be considered haram simply because they have a melody and sound. However, it only becomes haram for a person to listen to them when they become a tool to incite people towards immoral and prohibited behaviour or when they prevent a person from fulfilling his obligatory religious duties.

=== Varieties of opinion ===
There is a fairly wide difference of opinion over what exceptions can be made to the prohibition on music. Examples of what is allowed include: vocals but not instruments; vocals but only if the audience is of the same sex; vocals and drums, or vocals and traditional one sided drum and tambourine, but no other instruments; any kind of music provided it is not passionate, sexually suggestive, or has lyrics in violation of Islamic principles.

- Some Muslims believe musical instruments are haram and only vocals are allowed, but the performer must be of the same gender as the audience.
- A cappella music (whatever the audience) has led to a rich tradition of devotional singing in Islam. In support of singing being halal, the jurist Abu Bakr ibn al-Arabi says, "No sound hadith is available concerning the prohibition of singing", while Ibn Hazm says, "All that is reported on this subject is false and fabricated."
- There are some Muslims who believe drums are permissible, but no other instruments.
- Indian Islamic scholar Zakir Naik maintains musical instruments are haram except for two—the daf (a traditional one sided drum) and tambourine, which are also mentioned in Hadith.
  - According to the Deobandi scholar Muhammad ibn Adam Al-Kawthari, exception in the prohibition of music can be made for women playing the Daf, at celebrations and festivals, according to a minority group of Sunni Islam and another a group of Shiites. This exception comes from a well-known hadith in which two small girls were singing to a woman, and the Islamic Prophet Muhammad instructed Abu Bakr to let them continue, stating, "Leave them Abu Bakr, for every nation has an Eid (i.e. festival) and this day is our Eid."
- Still other Muslims believe that all instruments are allowed, provided they are used for acceptable or halal types of music and are not sexually arousing or un-Islamic. Hence there is a long history of instrumental accompaniments to devotional songs, particularly in the Shia and Sufi traditions. Many Sufi orders use music as part of their worship, most notably in Qawwali performances.
- According to the Irish Times, "a majority of Muslims" follow the view taken by modern scholars such as Yusuf al-Qaradawi that music is forbidden "only if it leads the believer into activities that are clearly defined as prohibited, such as drinking alcohol and illicit sex".

Imam al-Ghazali, reported several hadith and came to the conclusion that music in and of itself is permitted, saying: "All these Ahadith are reported by al-Bukhari and singing and playing are not haram." He also references a narration from Khidr, wherein a favorable opinion of music is expressed. In the Iḥyāʾ ʿUlūm al-Dīn, al-Ghazālī includes an anecdote attributed to a meeting with al-Khiḍr, in which Khiḍr is asked about samāʿ (listening to music and poetry). Khiḍr is reported to have replied that it is ‘a pure draught upon which only the feet of the learned can stand.’ Al-Ghazālī presents this story as a supportive remark within his broader argument for the permissibility of music under certain conditions, though it is not treated as a Prophetic hadith or legally binding proof.

According to Hussein Rashid, "contemporary scholars including Shaykh al-Azhar Mahmud Shaltut, Shaykh Yusuf Qaradawi, and Ayatollah Ruhollah Khomeini have all issued legal rulings that audio arts [including music] that do not encourage people to go against the faith are permitted."

Yusuf al-Qaradawi in his book "The Lawful and the Prohibited in Islam", states songs/singing is not haram unless:

1. the subject matter of songs is "against the teachings of Islam", such as praising wine;
2. the "manner" of singing is haram, such as "being accompanied by suggestive sexual movement";
3. it leads to "excessive involvement with entertainment", such as wasting time that ought to be spent on religion;
4. if it "arouses one's passions, leads him towards sin, excites the animal instincts, and dulls spirituality";
5. if it is done "in conjunction with haram activities – for example, at a drinking party".

=== Shia interpretation and Iran ===
Based upon the ahadith, numerous Iranian Grand Ayatollahs; Sadiq Hussaini Shirazi, Mohammad-Reza Golpaygani, Lotfollah Safi Golpaygani, Mohammad-Taqi Mesbah-Yazdi, Ahmad Jannati and others, ruled that all music and instrument playing is haram, no matter the purpose. Grand Ayatollah Ruhollah Khomeini held a similar religious position, stating on 23 July 1979: "If you want independence for your country, you must suppress music and not fear to be called old‐fashioned. Music is a betrayal of the nation and of youth." During the Iranian Revolution, Khomeini said: "...music is like a drug, whoever acquires the habit can no longer devote himself to important activities. We must completely eliminate it." From 1979 to 1989, all the music on radio and television was banned except occasional "revolutionary songs" that were performed in a strong martial style. After Khomeini's death, reformist Rafsanjani and Khatami administrations gradually lifted the ban on music. The second supreme leader of Iran, Ali Khamenei, stated his admiration of Western music in 2014, and nowadays music is officially permitted in Iran by the government as long as it is Iranian -- Iranian folk music, classical music, and pop music is allowed.

=== Doubts about prohibition ===
At least a few sources blame prohibition of music not on rigorous interpretation of scripture but the association of "fashionable" secular music "with erotic dance and drinking" (Jacob M. Landau), or "illicit behavior tied to music, rather than to the music itself" (Hussein Rashid). According to Rashid, the Quran, "contains no direct references to music", and hadith contains "conflicting evidence"; Landau states that scholars antagonistic to music "relied on forced interpretations of a few unclear passages in the Qurʾān" or Hadīth".

== Islamic music ==
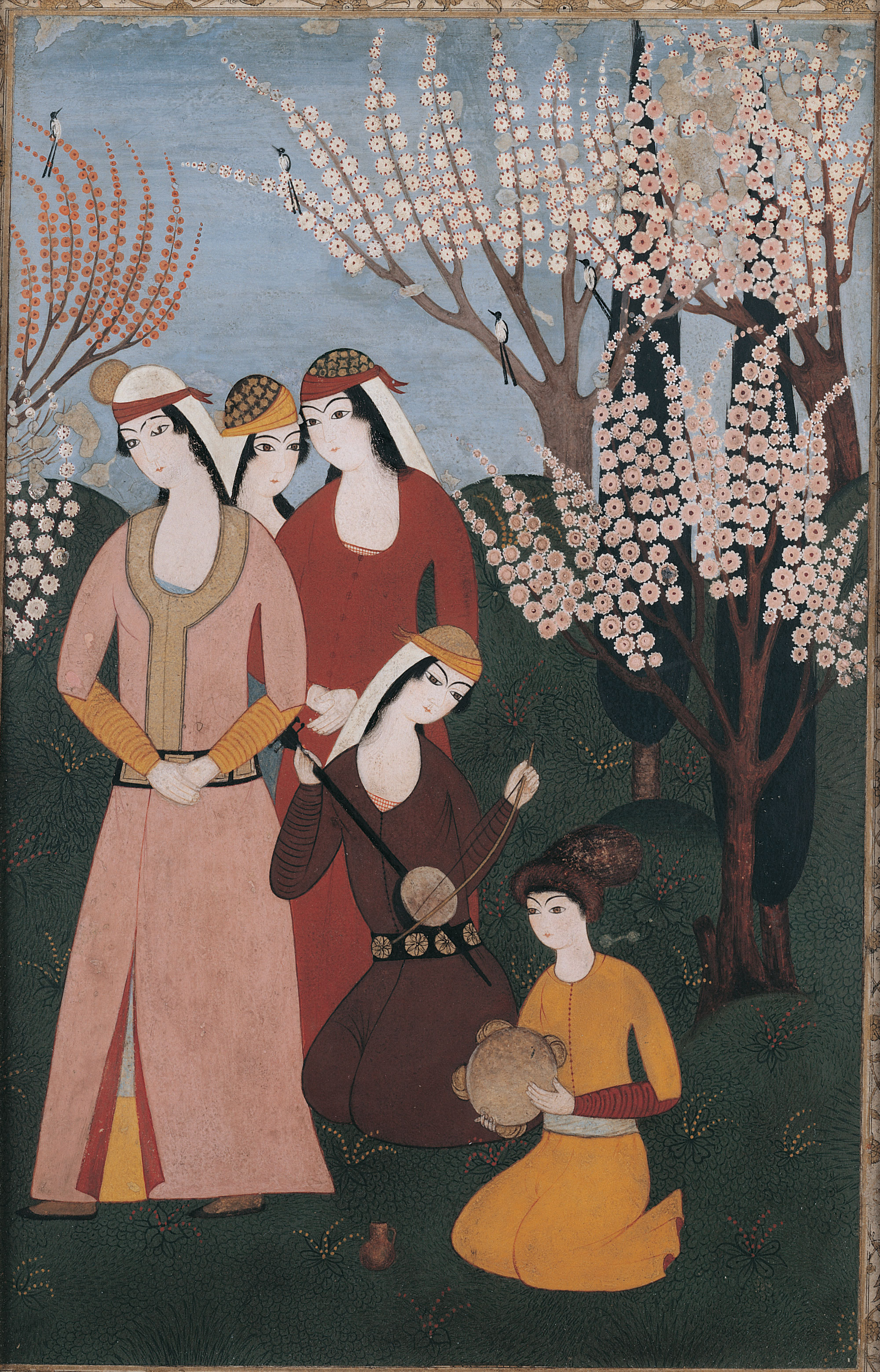
A Musical Gathering – Ottoman, 18th century

Notwithstanding prohibitions on music by certain Islamic scholars, in many parts of the Muslim world devotional/religious music and secular music is well developed and popular. Historically, Islamic art and music flourished during the Islamic Golden Age. Today, secular and folk musical styles in the Muslim Middle East are found in Arabic music, Egyptian music, Iranian music, Turkish classical music; and in North Africa, Algerian, and Moroccan music. South Asia has distinctive style of music – Afghan, Bangladeshi, Maldivian, Pakistani music.

Nasheed is a Muslim devotional recitation music recited in various melodies by some Muslims of today without any musical instruments, or possibly with percussion.

Music for public religious celebrations includes:

- Ta'ziyeh music (Shi'ite) – a passion play depicting the martyrdom of Imam Husayn ibn Ali, part musical drama, part religious drama, rarely performed outside Iran;
- Ashura music (Shi'ite) – performed during the Muharram mourning period, commemorating the deaths of Imam Hussein and his followers
- Thikiri – from the Arabic word dhikr, means remembrance of God, performed by the Qadiriyya Sufi orders of waYao or Yao people in East and Southern Africa (Tanzania, Mozambique, Malawi, Zimbabwe and South Africa);
- Menzuma – moral songs performed in Ethiopia;
- Madih nabawi – Arabic hymns praising Muhammad.

At least according to one scholar, Jacob M. Landau, not only is secular and folk music found in regions throughout the Muslim world, but Islam has its own distinctive category of music — the "Islamic music" or the "classical Islamic music" — that began development "with the advent of Islam about 610 CE" as a "new art". It formed from pre-Islamic Arabian music with "important contributions" from Persians, Byzantines, Turks, Berbers, and Moors. This music "is characterized by a highly subtle organization of melody and rhythm", where "the vocal component predominates over the instrumental", there is no harmony, only "a single line of melody", and the individual musician "is permitted, and indeed encouraged, to improvise". The core area where it is found stretches "from the Nile valley to Persia", and the farther away one travels, "the less one finds undiluted Islamic music."

== See also ==
- Islamic music
- Ottoman music
- Music censorship
