= Mimouni =

Mimouni is a surname. Notable people with the surname include:

- Farouk Mimouni (born 2001), Tunisian footballer
- Gilles Mimouni (born 1956), French architect and film director
- Rachid Mimouni (1945–1995), Algerian writer, teacher, and human rights activist
- Simon Claude Mimouni (born 1949), French biblical scholar
- Sofiane Mimouni (born 1957), Algerian diplomat
