= China–Arab relations =

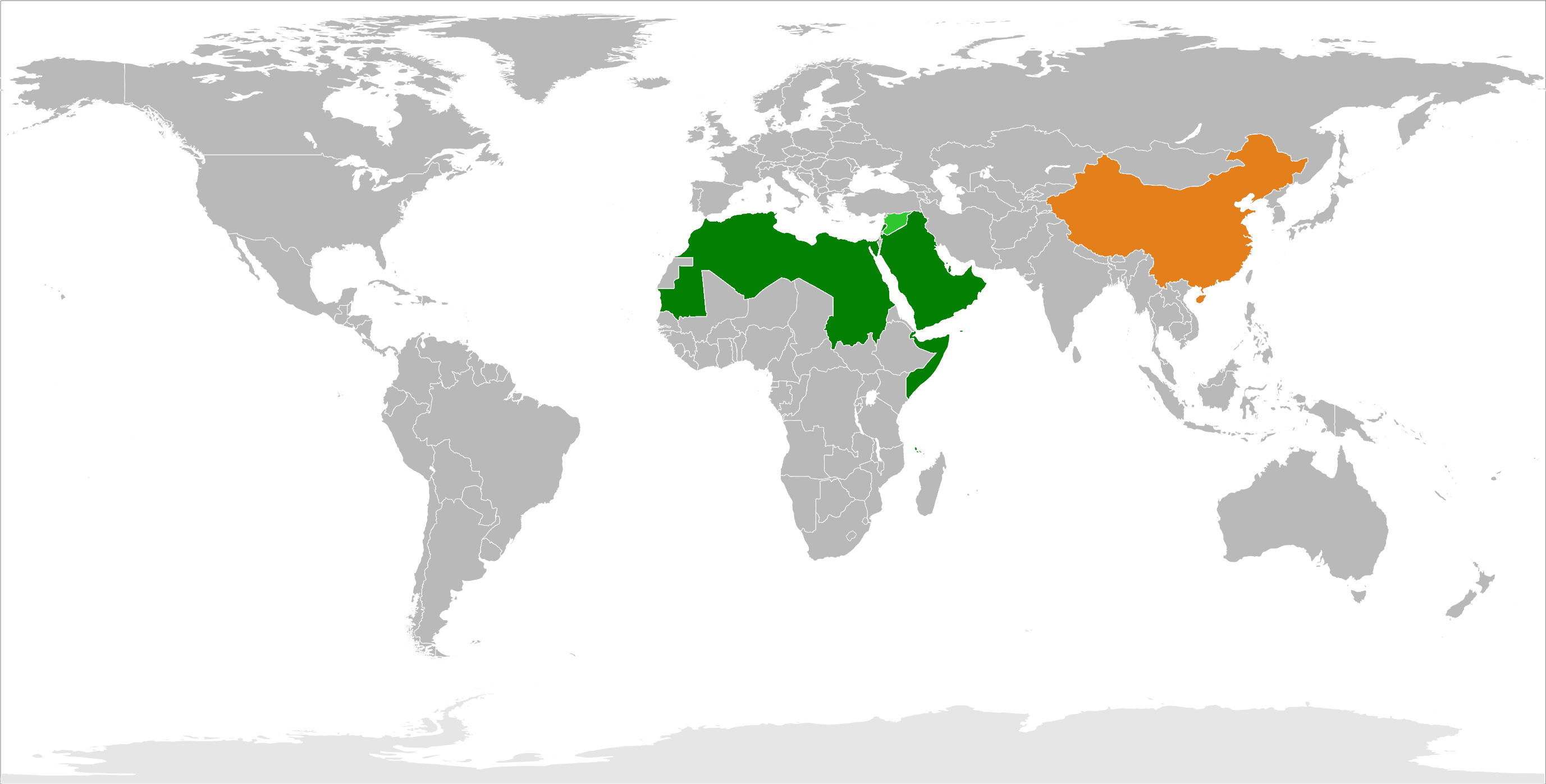
- Arab League: China

China–Arab relations (simplified Chinese: 中国与阿拉伯世界之间的关系; traditional Chinese: 中國與阿拉伯世界之間的關係; pinyin: Zhōngguó yǔ ālābó shìjiè zhī jiān de guānxì, Arabic: العلاقات بين الصين والعالم العربي, romanized: al-‘alāqāt bayn al-Ṣīn wal-‘ālam al-‘arabī), have extended historically back to the Rashidun Caliphate, with important trade routes, and good diplomatic relations. Since the establishment of the People's Republic of China (PRC), modern China–Arab relations have gotten significantly closer, with the China–Arab States Cooperation Forum (CASCF) helping the People's Republic of China and the Arab nations to establish a new partnership in an era of the growing globalization. As a result, close economic, political and military relations between the two sides have been maintained. From 2018, the relations became significantly warmer, with the PRC and the Arab countries exchanging state visits, establishing cooperation mechanism and providing support to each other.

Since 1990, no Arab country has official diplomatic relations with the Republic of China (ROC), although it is diplomatically represented in some nations via Taipei Economic and Cultural Offices.

== History ==
=== Medieval era ===
During the Tang dynasty, when relations with Arabs were first established, the Chinese called the Arabs 大食/大石 (Dàshí < Old Chi. *da[y]zyik). The Caliphate was called "Da Shi Guo" 大食國. The word is thought to be a transcription of Persian Tāzik or Tāzī, derived from a nisba of the Arab tribe Ṭayyiʾ. The modern term for Arab is 阿拉伯 (Ālābó or Alabo).

The Arab Islamic Caliph Uthman Ibn Affan (r. 644–656) sent an embassy to the Tang court at Chang'an.

During the Muslim conquest of Transoxiana, The Arab Umayyad commander, Qutayba ibn Muslim conquered the Bukharan territories of Numushkat and Ramithna in 707 CE (88 AH). But shortly after, he faced a coalition force of roughly 200,000 soldiers from Ferghana and Sogdiana, led by Kur Maghayun, who was the Chinese emperor's nephew. a heavy battle occurred. Qutayba managed to defeat the coalition army in combat, driving its commander to retreat, and then led his army back to his base at Merv.

Qutayba ibn Muslim is reported to have advanced as far as Kashgar, where he captured the city and fought the Chinese forces, took spoils and captives, and pushed deep into Chinese territory. the Tang emperor sent letter requesting to negotiate with Qutayba. Qutayba sent a Muslim delegation to negotiate with the emperor, resulting in an agreement between the Arabs and the Chinese under which the Muslims would withdraw from the city in exchange for tribute and valuable gifts from the Tang court. however, this report is dismissed by some modern historians. Historian Mahmoud Mohammed Khalaf replied to the dismissal claims and presented it as a rebuttal to the view of the historians who dismissed the claim of the battle, specifically to the Orientalist Gibb:

Thus it becomes clear that the Muslim conquests had in fact reached the city of Kashgar – one of the cities of China at that time. This stands as the strongest rebuttal to the claim of the orientalist Gibb, who alleged that the Muslim armies never reached the city, while the Hungarian orientalist Ármin Vámbéry affirmed that Muslim forces had reached East Turkestan and attacked the rulers of the Uyghurs. He further stated that the city of Canton was the easternmost frontier of Islam.

The Arab Umayyad Caliphate in 715 AD deposed Ikhshid, the king the Fergana Valley, and installed a new king Alutar on the throne. The deposed king fled to Kucha (seat of Anxi Protectorate), and sought Chinese intervention. The Chinese sent 10,000 troops under Zhang Xiaosong to Fergana. He defeated Alutar and the Arab occupation force at Namangan and reinstalled Ikhshid on the throne.

Chinese General Tang Jiahui led the Chinese to defeat the following Arab-Tibetan attack in the Battle of Aksu (717). The attack on Aksu was joined by Turgesh Khan Suluk. Both Uch Turfan and Aksu were attacked by the Turgesh, Arab, and Tibetan force on 15 August 717. Qarluqs serving under Chinese command, under Arsila Xian, a Western Turkic Qaghan serving under the Chinese Assistant Grand Protector General Tang Jiahui defeated the attack. Al-Yashkuri, the Arab commander and his army fled to Tashkent after they were defeated.

During the decline of the Umayyad Caliphate in 750, combined with Emperor Xuanzong's expansion policy, enabled Tang to reassert its influence in Transoxania and become the predominant power in Chinese Turkestan. However, this resurgence ended suddenly at the Battle of Talas in 751. The Tang army led by Gao Xianzhi was defeated by the Abbasid army under Ziyad ibn Salih near present-day Tashkent. Sources differ on the force numbers and casualties with army sizes ranging from 10,000 to 100,000 for the Chinese side and 30,000 to 200,000 for the Abbasid side, although the larger numbers for both are likely exaggerated. Chinese sources state that the Tang army suffered 20,000 to 30,000 casualties while Arab sources state that 50,000 Tang soldiers were killed and 20,000 were taken captive. This defeat marked the end of Tang westward expansion in Transoxiana.The Abbasids then consolidated their rule in Transoxania.

A Chinese captured at Talas, Du Huan, was brought to Baghdad and toured throughout the caliphate. He observed that in Merv, Khurasan, Arabs and Persians lived in mixed concentrations. He gave an account of the Arab people in the Tongdian in 801 which he wrote when he returned to China.

Arabia [Dashi] was originally part of Persia. The men have high noses, are dark, and bearded. The women are very fair [white] and when they go out they veil the face. Five times daily they worship God [Tianshen]. They wear silver girdles, with silver knives suspended. They do not drink wine, nor use music. Their place of worship will accommodate several hundreds of people. Every seventh day the king (Caliph) sits on high, and speaks to those below saying, ' Those who are killed by the enemy will be born in heaven above; those who slay the enemy will receive happiness.' Therefore they are usually valiant fighters. Their land is sandy and stony, not fit for cultivation; so they hunt and eat flesh.

This (Kufa) is the place of their capital. Its men and women are attractive in appearance and large in stature. Their clothing is handsome, and their carriage and demeanor leisurely and lovely. When women go outdoors, they always cover their faces, regardless of whether they are noble or base. They pray to heaven five times a day. They eat meat [ even] when practicing abstention, [for] they believe the taking of life to be meritorious.

The followers of the confession of the “Dashi” (the Arabs) have a means to denote the degrees of family relations, but it is degenerated and they don’t bother about it. They don’t eat the meat of pigs, dogs, donkeys and horses, they don’t respect neither the king of the country, neither their parents, they don’t believe in supernatural powers, they perform sacrifice to heaven and to no one else. According their customs every seventh day is a holiday, on which no trade and no cash transactions are done, whereas when they drink alcohol, they are behaving in a ridiculous and undisciplined way during the whole day.

An Arab envoy presented horses and a girdle to the Chinese in 713, but he refused to pay homage to the Emperor, said, he said "In my country we only bow to God never to a Prince". The first thing the court was going to do was to murder the envoy, however, a minister intervened, saying "a difference in the court etiquette of foreign countries ought not to be considered a crime." A second Arab envoy performed the required rituals and paid homage to the Emperor in 726 A.D. He was gifted with a "purple robe and a girdle".

There was a controversy between the Arab ambassadors and Uyghur Khaganate Ambassadors over who should go first into the Chinese court, they were then guided by the Master of Ceremonies into two different entrances. Three Da shi ambassadors arrived at the Tang court in 798 A.D. A war which was raging between the Arabs and Tibetans from 785 to 804 benefited the Chinese.

Products were traded by sea routes between China and Arabs.

According to Professor Samy S. Swayd Fatimid missionaries made their Dawah in China during the reign of al-'Aziz bi-Allah.

=== Military and political relations ===
One legend among Muslims in China said that China during the Tang dynasty exchanged 3,000 Chinese soldiers sending them to the Arabs and the Arabs in turn sent 3,000 Arab Muslim soldiers to China.

When Caliph Al-Saffah died in 754, Chinese sources record that his successor, the Abbasid caliph Al-Mansur, sent his diplomatic delegations regularly to China. Al-Mansur's delegations were known in China as Khayi Tashi (Black Clothes).

Caliph Abu Ja'far al-Mansur established friendly relations with the Chinese. Historical sources mention a series of successive Arab embassies after the Battle of Talas. in 756, Abu Ja'far al-Mansur provided the Chinese Emperor Xuanzong of Tang with a contingent of 3,000 to 4,000 soldiers to suppress the An Lushan Rebellion that erupted against him. After suppressing this rebellion, the Emperor allowed them to settle in China's most important cities as a reward for the assistance they provided to the Emperor. Over time, these Arabs married Chinese women, and a new generation emerged, from whom came the Muslims of China.

As a result of these good relations between both sides - the Abbasids and the Chinese - Arab merchants settled in China. They had a judge (qadi) who issued rulings according to Islamic law, led prayers, and performed Islamic rituals. The Chinese Empire granted Arabs special facilities for selling their goods, and the Emperor himself would order the purchase of some of these goods for his personal account. Thus, Arabs were able to penetrate deep into the country and practice trade with complete freedom. For a long time, Arabs found complete welcome there, to the extent that the shops of major Chinese merchants would supply Arab traders with all the products and fine manufactures they needed from their lands to be shipped in Arab caravans upon their return to the lands of Islam.

The Abbasids continued to send embassies to China and 13 diplomatic gifts are recorded between 752 and 798.

A massacre of foreign Arab and Persian Muslim merchants by Tian Shengong happened during the An Lushan rebellion in the Yangzhou massacre (760), since Tian Shengong was defecting to the Tang dynasty and wanted them to publicly recognized and acknowledge him, and the Tang court portrayed the war as between rebel hu barbarians of the Yan against Han Chinese of the Tang dynasty, Tian Shengong slaughtered foreigners as a blood sacrifice to prove he was loyal to the Han Chinese Tang dynasty state and for them to recognize him as a regional warlord without him giving up territory, and he killed other foreign Hu barbarian ethnicities as well whose ethnic groups were not specified, not only Arabs and Persians since it was directed against all foreigners. The Tang dynasty recovered its power decades after the An Lushan rebellion and was still able to launch offensive conquests and campaigns like its destruction of the Uyghur Khaganate in Mongolia in 840-847. It was the Huang Chao rebellion in 874–884 by the native Han rebel Huang Chao that permanently destroyed the power of the Tang dynasty since Huang Chao not only devastated the north but marched into southern China which An Lushan failed to do due to the Battle of Suiyang. Huang Chao's army in southern China committed the Guangzhou massacre against foreign Arab and Persian Muslim, Zoroastrian, Jewish and Christian merchants in 878–879 at the seaport and trading entrepot of Guangzhou, and captured both Tang dynasty capitals, Luoyang and Chang'an. A medieval Chinese source claimed that Huang Chao killed 8 million people. Even though Huang Chao was eventually defeated, the Tang Emperors lost all their power to regional jiedushi and Huang Chao's former lieutenant Zhu Wen who had defected to the Tang court turned the Tang emperors into his puppets and completed the destruction of Chang'an by dismantling Chang'an and transporting the materials east to Luoyang when he forced the court to move the capital. Zhu Wen deposed the last Tang Emperor in 907 and founded Later Liang (Five Dynasties), plunging China into the Five Dynasties and Ten Kingdoms period as regional jiedushi warlords declared their own dynasties and kingdoms.

Arab Caliph Harun al-Rashid established an alliance with China. The Abbasid caliph Abu Ja'far Abdallah ibn Muhammad al-Mansur (Abu Giafar) was the one who sent the mercenaries. Several embassies from the Abbaside Caliphs to the Chinese Court are recorded in the T'ang Annals, the most important of these being those of (A-bo-lo-ba) Abul Abbas, the founder of the new dynasty, that of (A-p'u-ch'a-fo) Abu Giafar, the builder of Bagdad, of whom more must be said immediately; and that of (A-lun) Harun al Raschid, best known, perhaps, in modern days through the popular work, Arabian Nights. The Abbasides or " Black Flags," as they were commonly called, are known in Chinese history as the Heh-i Ta-shih, " The Black-robed Arabs."

=== Trade ===
In Islamic times Muslims from Arabia traded with China. For instance, China imported frankincense from southern Arabia via Srivijaya.

The Chinese Muslim Admiral Zheng He made several expeditions to the Middle East. In modern diplomatic discourses with the Islamic countries, China cites this history as an example of historic ties and peaceful and prosperous exchanges.

=== 20th century ===
The Republic of China under the Kuomintang had established relations with Egypt and Saudi Arabia in the 1930s. The Chinese government sponsored students like Wang Jingzhai and Muhammad Ma Jian to go the Al-Azhar University to study. Muslim pilgrims also made the Hajj to Mecca from China.

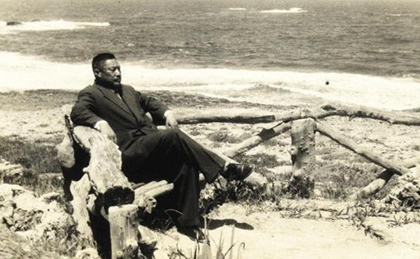
Ma Bufang in Egypt in 1955.

Chinese Muslims were sent to Saudi Arabia and Egypt to denounce the Japanese during the Second Sino-Japanese War.

The Fuad Muslim Library in China was named after King Fuad I of Egypt by the Chinese Muslim Ma Songting.

In 1939 Isa Yusuf Alptekin and Ma Fuliang (馬賦良) were sent by the Kuomintang to Middle Eastern countries such as Egypt, Turkey, and Syria to gain support for China in the Second Sino-Japanese War. Others included Wang Zengshan, Xue Wenbo, and Lin Zhongming. The Hui Muslim Imam Da Pusheng (达浦生) also toured the Middle East to confront Japanese propagandists in Arab countries and denounce their invasion to the Islamic world. He directly confronted Japanese agents in Arab countries and challenged them in public over their propaganda. He went to British India, Hejaz in Saudi Arabia and Cairo in Egypt.

Ambassador Wang Shi-ming was a Chinese Muslim, and the Republic of China ambassador to Kuwait.

Before 1955, the People's Republic of China (PRC) did not have a stance on the Arab-Israeli conflict. This was largely because the PRC had few diplomatic contacts with Israel and the independent Arab states recognized the ROC at the time and not the PRC.

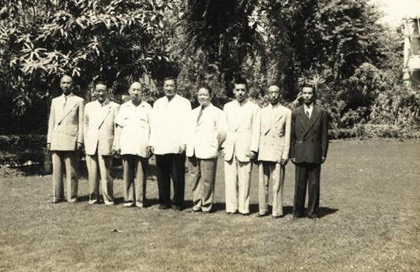
Ma Bufang and Family in Egypt in 1954.

The PRC first made diplomatic contacts with the Arab countries at the Bandung Conference in 1955. In 1956, the PRC established its first formal diplomatic relations with Arab countries, beginning with Egypt, Syria, and Yemen, and also established trade agreements and cultural agreements with those three countries.

The relations between China and the Arab League as an organization officially started in 1956.

In the early 1960s, China sought to mobilize support of the Arab countries for a second Bandung Conference, proposed to be held in Algiers. The effort failed as a result of events including the 1965 Algerian coup d'état, the ouster of Sukarno in Indonesia, the 1966 Ghanaian coup d'état, and Egypt growing closer to the Soviet Union.

In the early phase of the Cultural Revolution, China curtailed its diplomatic activities, including withdrawing its ambassadors from all of the Arab countries other than Egypt. China continued to maintain its diplomatic ties to non-state actors such as the Palestinian organizations and other groups which China also viewed as liberation groups. From April to July 1969, China's embassies in the Arab countries were reactivated.

China's relations with the Arab states, as well as Iran, deepened and as a result in 1971 China became more aloof from Arab insurgents it had previously supported, such as the fedayeen and the Popular Front for the Liberation of the Occupied Arabian Gulf (PFLOAG).

In 1993, the Arab League opened its first office in China, when then-Secretary-General Asmat Abdel-Meguid went to an official visit to Beijing.

In 1996, the Chinese Communist Party (CCP) General Secretary Jiang Zemin gave an interview to Abdel-Meguid during his visit to Egypt, and became the first Chinese leader to officially visit the Arab League.

=== 21st century ===
The China-Arab States Cooperation Forum (CASCF) was established in 2004 during a visit by CCP General Secretary Hu Jintao to the Arab League headquarters in Cairo, Egypt. CASCF was the first cooperation forum between the Arab League and any other country or region. CASCF membership consists of China and the Arab League, which officially represents its twenty-two member states as a relatively unified body. CASCF therefore serves as the primary multilateral coordination mechanism between China and the Arab States. This coordination by the Arab League allows Arab states to negotiate actively for collective projects involving multiple states, such as railway projects, nuclear power projects, and Dead Sea initiatives. The core political norms that China advocates within CASCF are its Five Principles of Peaceful Coexistence: mutual respect for territory and sovereignty, mutual nonaggression, mutual noninterference in internal affairs, equality and mutual benefit, and peaceful co-existence. These principles are a conservative interpretation of the Westphalian norms of state sovereignty. China's advocacy for this strict interpretation of Westphalian sovereignty has intensified since the 2011 NATO intervention in Libya, creating some tensions within CASCF over the positions China (as a member of the United Nations Security Council) takes on Syria, although generally the Arab League states continue to support China's advocacy of the Five Principles.

In July 2019, UN ambassadors of 37 countries, including Algeria, Bahrain, Egypt, Saudi Arabia, Sudan, Syria, and the United Arab Emirates, signed a joint letter to the United Nations Human Rights Council (UNHRC) defending China's treatment of Uyghurs and other Muslim minority groups in the Xinjiang. Qatar subsequently retracted its support after signing. Algeria, Kuwait, and Oman were among the 16 countries that defended China's policies in Xinjiang in 2019 but did not do so in 2020.

Adam Hoffman and Roie Yellinek of the Middle East Institute wrote in May 2020 that the outbreak of the COVID-19 pandemic, which spread from China to the Arab states, has set a complex dynamic in relations between the sides, created an opportunity for solidarity and assistance, and at the same time exacerbating present challenges.

In 2020, 15 of the 22 Arab League member states had backed the 2020 Hong Kong national security law at the United Nations, alongside 38 other countries.

As of 2020, there were 14 Confucius Institutes in the Arab world. Confucius Institutes are one of the major ways China invests soft power in the Arab countries and in the world. It can be said that the Institutes, as an instrument of Chinese soft power, have effectively penetrated the Arab world and are welcomed without significant criticism.

A 2025 academic review notes that China's policy toward Arab countries emphasizes strategic ambiguity and transactional diplomacy. Rather than aligning with any single bloc, China fosters parallel relationships with both monarchies and republics, utilizing economic instruments such as infrastructure investment and summit diplomacy. This calibrated engagement, according to the review, enhances China's regional presence without direct political entanglement.

China proposes "peace through development" in the Middle East, an approach that CCP general secretary Xi Jinping articulated during a visit to Arab League headquarters. This approach proposes that sustainable peace in the Middle East requires comprehensive development initiatives. Chinese narratives of peace through development in the Middle East cite the fact that attempts by outside actors to create prosperity through the development of democratic institutions in Iraq and Afghanistan failed.

Within the first ten years of the Belt and Road Initiative, China signed a memorandum of understanding with every Arab country. China describes this as a signal of the Arab countries' recognition of the BRI as "an important international public product and a platform for international cooperation."

== China's foreign relations with Arab countries ==
Relations between China and the Arab League

- Algeria–China relations
- Bahrain–China relations
- China–Comoros relations
- China–Djibouti relations
- China–Egypt relations
- China–Iraq relations
- China–Jordan relations
- China–Kuwait relations
- China–Lebanon relations
- China–Libya relations
- China–Mauritania relations
- China–Morocco relations
- China–Oman relations
- China–Palestine relations
- China–Qatar relations
- China–Saudi Arabia relations
- China–Somalia relations
- China–Sudan relations
- China–Syria relations
- China–Tunisia relations
- China–United Arab Emirates relations
- China–Yemen relations

== See also ==
- Silk Road
- Sino-Roman relations
