= Northern Silk Road =

Historic trade route in Asia

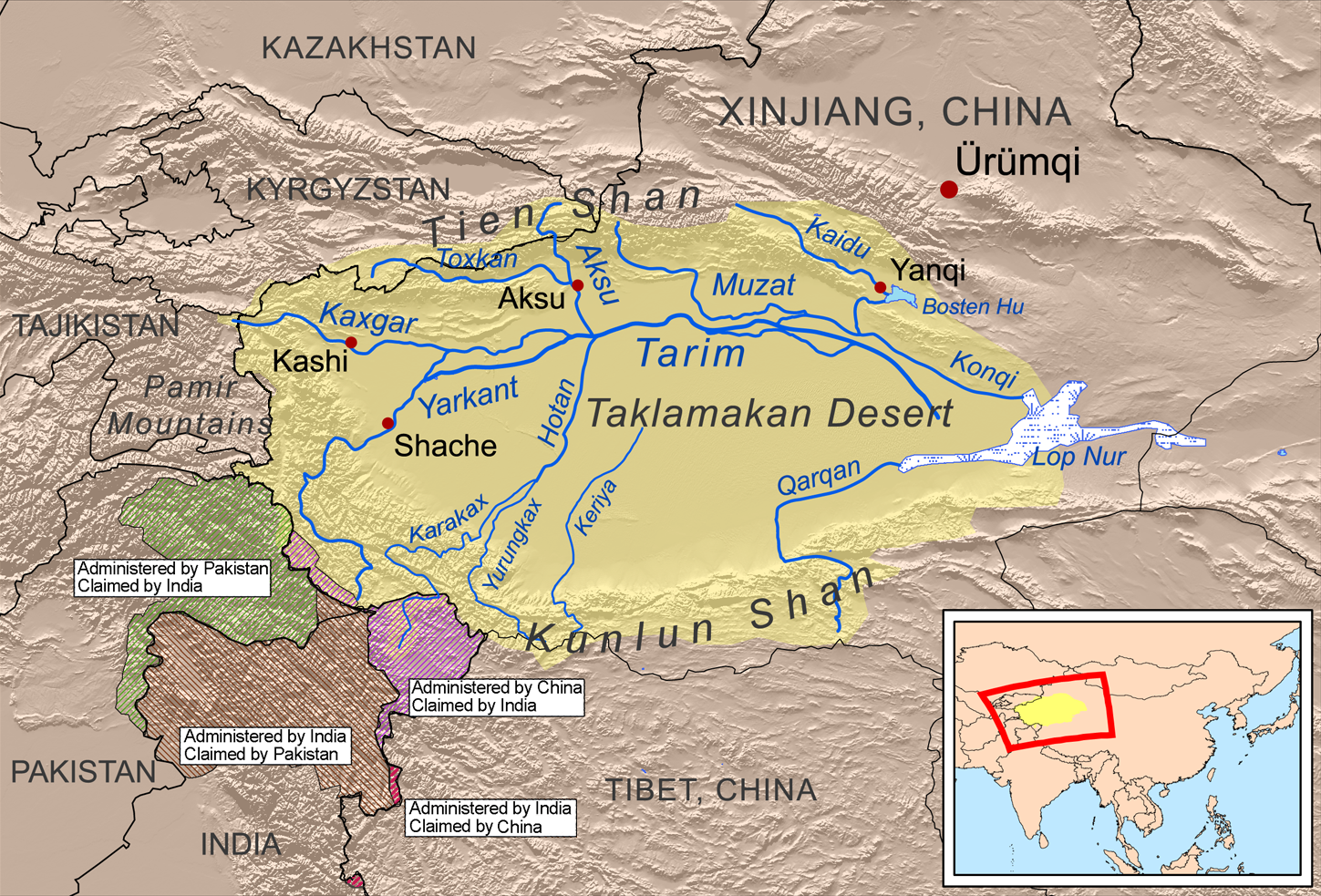
Taklamakan Desert

The Northern Silk Road is a historic inland trade route in Northwest China and Central Asia (historically known as the Western Regions) originating in the ancient Chinese capital of Chang'an (modern day Xi'an), westwards through the Hexi Corridor (in the modern Gansu province) into the Tarim Basin, going north of the Taklamakan Desert along the two sides of the Tianshan Mountains, and then past the Pamir Mountains to reach the ancient kingdoms of Bactria, Sogdia, Kushan, Parthia, and eventually the eastern provinces of the Roman Empire. It is the northernmost branch of the several Silk Roads providing trade, cultural exchanges, and military mobilizations between China and the outside world.

The route was first developed by the Han dynasty in the latter part of the 1st century BC to secure diplomatic alliances against the Xiongnu confederacy, with whom China had been having escalating conflicts, and was progressively transformed into a major trade route during subsequent dynasties to project Chinese influence towards the west.

== Route ==
The route started at Chang'an, the capital of the Western Han and Tang dynasties, which was moved further east to Luoyang during the Eastern Han dynasty. The route traveled northwest from Shaanxi Province through the Chinese province of Gansu and split into three further routes; two of these followed the mountain ranges north and south of the Taklamakan Desert to rejoin at Kashgar, and the third went north of the Tian Shan mountains through Turpan, Talgar, and Almaty (in what is now southeast Kazakhstan).

The Kashgar routes split again west of the city, with one branch heading down Erkeshtam and the Alay Valley towards Termez and Balkh, while the other traveled via the Torugart Pass to Kokand in the Fergana Valley and then west across the Karakum Desert towards Merv, joining the southern route briefly.

One of the branch routes turned northwest to the north of the Aral and Caspian seas and then on to the Black Sea.

The Silk Road, centered on trade, was a significant factor in the development of the civilization of China.

== Culture exchange ==
=== Religion ===
The Silk Road served not just as a means of trading goods, but also as an environment for cultural exchange. The Silk Road directed the flow of cultures, religions, and ideas, creating a rich tapestry of variety throughout Eurasia. Buddhism, Christianity, Islam, and other religions thrived and expanded along these ancient trade routes, leaving a lasting legacy in massive monuments such as China's Mogao Caves, Xi'an's Nestorian Stele, and Iraq's Great Mosque of Samarra. The civilizations and people that lived along the Silk Roads evolved and advanced as they traded and shared ideas. They learned and adapted from one another, promoting further breakthroughs in religion, language, and science.

=== Political/military exchange ===
The Northern Silk Road had a key role in promoting cultural and religious interchange among many governments and peoples. Other faiths were introduced through cultural exchange, but the three most popular were referred to as “The three alien religious”. Despite considerable political friction at the time, cultural contact continued and expanded, resulting in a very large, rich trade between the west and east we witness today. For example, during the Sui and Tang periods of the Northern dynasties, good, strong diplomatic relations existed with the Sasanian Empire of Persia, which resulted in the spread of Zoroastrianism, Jingjia “The Church of the East”, and Manichaeism religions. The cultural fusion between Persia and China is only one of several cultural contacts that occurred along the Northern route.

Another cultural interchange between Persia and China can be seen in Tang artisans in China employing Persian patterns in their works, integrating different cultures through pattern designs that attracted the creative eye of the Tang crafters. The skills exchange also included a navigation log, which aided in road navigation and military strategy. This skill exchange occurred when Yang Liangyao, a diplomat of the Tang era, visited the Abbasid Caliphate. His visit resulted in an important cultural exchange in which he was introduced to a complete navigation diary of the Silk Road that led to the Tang court, which was very useful for him and significant because there was a military conflict between Tibet and the Tang, making overland travel difficult.

== Discoveries ==
One of the many discoveries along the Northern Silk Road is the painted Buddhist cave temples. In the early 12th century, many countries sent research expeditions along the Northern Silk Road, including Japan, England, Russia, and Germany. While on these journeys, the travellers detached many wall paintings carefully from their original setting, which could be an interior wall or the ceilings of the Buddhist cave complexes. In expedition diaries during this time, they describe "the wall paintings in a very detailed manner in the form of descriptions, photographs, sketches, and tracings, and map the context and work in situ".

During the 3rd Prussian Turfan expedition in 1906, a Buddhist cave was rediscovered in the valley of Sim-sim, close to Kiriš in the district of Kucha. The cave temples were cut and shaped into cliffs. An example of this is the cave called "Ritterhöhle", so called because of art located on its central walls that looked like a knight in a suit of amor.

== See also ==
- Hexi Corridor
- Kashgar
- Dunhuang
