= China–Libya relations =

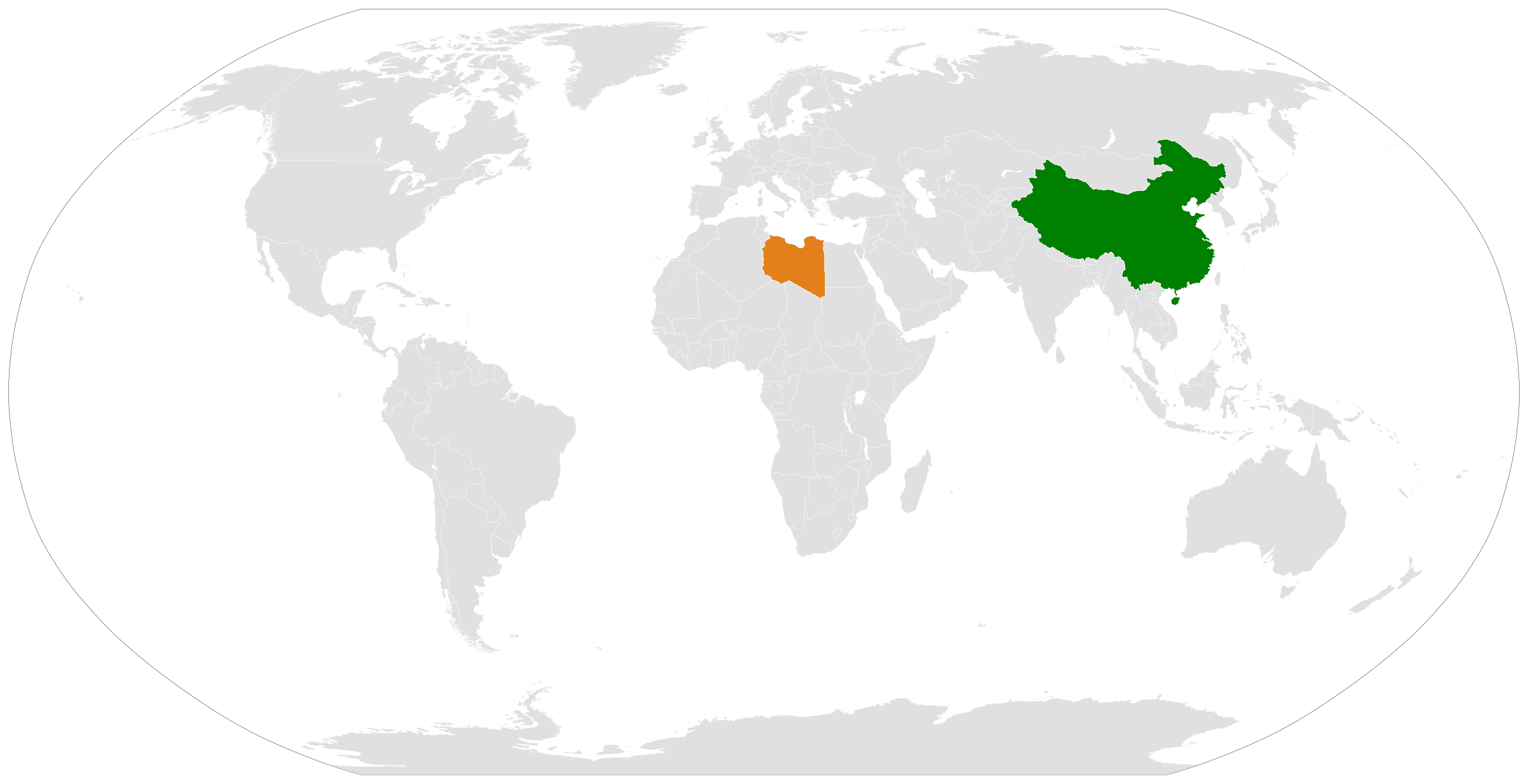

- China: Libya

China–Libya relations refer to the bilateral relations between China and Libya. Topics encompassed by these relations include diplomatic, economic, and military relations; the presence of Chinese migrants in Libya; and Chinese investment in Libya. From 1951 through 1978, there was little bilateral cooperation between the two countries, but, in 1978, the Chinese and Libyan governments established formal diplomatic relations. This connection between the two countries was initially shaped by Cold War-era tensions and the crisis in Libya during the Arab Spring has further complicated the relationship between the two countries.

== Diplomatic relations ==
The first diplomatic encounter between China and Libya occurred at the Bandung Conference in 1955. Sino-Libyan relations were minimal dating from Libya's independence in 1953 through 1969, when Libya was a monarchy under King Idris, as the kingdom had strong relations with the U.S., UK, and Italy. Libya used these relationships with the U.S. and the UK to develop its existing oil reserves, expanding the market for Libya.

When Muammar Gaddafi became the leader of Libya in 1969, he sought to establish relations with the USSR to relieve eroding relations with the United States. The development of Libya's relationship with the USSR occurred at the height of the Sino-Soviet conflict, which diminished the likelihood of strong Sino-Libyan relations.

A further deterrent to Sino-Libyan relations was that, prior to establishing relations with the People's Republic of China (PRC), Libya established diplomatic relations with Taiwan in 1959. At that time, Taiwan was recognized by the United Nations (UN) as the Republic of China (ROC). This recognition shifted in 1971, when Libya voted in support of United Nations General Assembly Resolution 2758, which established the People's Republic of China as “the only legitimate representative of China to the United Nations.” This vote by Libya to recognize China helped set the stage for official relations between the two countries, which were officially established on 9 August 1978.

Relations between China and Libya have often been difficult, as Gaddafi often criticized China. Despite this criticism, he visited China for the first and only time in 1982. While he was there, he signed multiple agreements and created joint committees on trade, economic cooperation, science and technology, and construction. As a result of Gaddafi's stay in China, visits by senior representatives between the two countries became more frequent.

In 2006, relations became strained when Gaddafi hosted China's foreign minister in Libya to affirm Libya's agreement with the One China Principle. At the same time, Gaddafi's son, Saif al-Islam, simultaneously met with Taiwanese President Chen Shui-bian in Taipei and invited him to Libya in an effort to build ties. This meeting occurred a few months later and China perceived this visit by Chen Shui-bian as a deviation from the United Nations General Assembly Resolution 2758 of 1971, as China worried that Libya would change its stance on China's ownership of Taiwan. Investment and communication still continued between the two nations, but this incident altered Chinese perception of Libya.

Following the outbreak of fighting in Libya in February 2011, President Obama imposed sanctions against Gaddafi, a move which prompted no opposition or protest from China. Furthermore, China voted in favor of United Nations Security Council Resolution 1970, which banned the provision of weapons to the Gaddafi regime.

In March 2011, pressure from the African Union and the Arab League prompted China to support an arms embargo, travel ban, and asset freeze and to abstain from voting on United Nations Security Council Resolution 1973, which established a no-fly zone. China's abstention on this resolution was also partly due to concern over Chinese investment in the region. China later expressed displeasure at how Resolution 1973 was executed, stating that they did not foresee that NATO would use such extreme military power against Gaddafi. China was concerned about a new precedent of NATO intervention that lacked respect for sovereign nations.

While the fighting was ongoing in 2011, China attempted to maintain relations with the Gaddafi regime while also forming a relationship with the opposition's political body, the National Transitional Council (NTC). Chinese Foreign Minister Yang Jeichi met with Mahmoud Jabril, the chairman of the executive board of NTC, in June 2011 along with Abdelati Obeidi, a representative from the Libyan government. China was interested in mediating peaceful conversations between the two sides of the Libyan conflict due to Chinese concern about economic investment in Libya.

With the beginning of a second Libyan civil war in 2014, China was again forced to navigate relationships with different political groups vying for power. In 2015, the Government of National Accord (GNA) became the Libyan political authority officially recognized by the UN after negotiations that China supported. China officially recognized the GNA, which allowed for multiple meetings between Chinese diplomats and representatives of the GNA that occurred between 2016 and 2020. At one of these meetings, in 2018, Mohamed Taha Siala, the GNA Minister for Foreign Affairs, was an attendee at the Forum on China-Africa Cooperation (FOCAC). During this event, Siala met with Wang Yi, Chinese State Councilor and Foreign Minister. Siala and Yi signed a memorandum of understanding, agreeing to collaborate on bringing China's Belt and Road Initiative (BRI) to Libya. While supporting the GNA, China also maintained economic ties with the Libyan National Army (LNA).

== Economic relations ==
During the 1980s and 1990s, economic relations between China and Libya began to develop with a primary focus on the oil industry.

Chinese President Jiang Zemin’s diplomatic visit to Libya in 2002 helped spur Chinese investment in Libya. This visit paved the way for Libya to sign a trade agreement that opened Libyan land and oil for Chinese firms. China enthusiastically entered into the Libyan oil market, headed by the China Petroleum Pipeline. Along with freeing the Libyan oil market to Chinese investment, a Chinese corporation secured a Libyan railroad contract for up to $40 million.

In 2008, China received 4.8% of Libya's oil exports. This percentage peaked at 13% in 2011, before the outbreak of fighting in Libya. While China was a major buyer of Libyan oil, Libya was not one of China's main oil suppliers. In 2010, China imported 3% of its crude oil from Libya and this number was reduced to 1% by September 2011.

In 2009, China's imports from Libya increased 22.6% and were valued at US$3.17 billion. Also in 2009, Libya was the recipient of one of the biggest projects signed with a Chinese company in Africa. The project was the Surt-Tripoli section, which was valued at US$24.2 billion.

When the conflict started in Libya in February 2011, there were at least 75 Chinese private and state-owned firms in Libya. These firms were mainly supporting and investing in telecommunications and construction projects.

The 2011 Libyan crisis negatively impacted Chinese projects in Africa, as many work sites were looted and damaged, and personnel were threatened, causing some Chinese companies to let go of their project sites. While 35,860 Chinese workers were ultimately evacuated during the Arab Spring, China still monitored the situation in Libya and the rest of the Middle East and North Africa closely due to their continued interest in Libyan oil reserves.

In the first 8 months of 2012, Libya was China's 5th largest trading partner in Africa.

In 2017, China became the largest importer of oil in the entire world. With 43% percent of these oil imports coming from the Middle East and North Africa region, China has expressed interest in establishing more contracts in this region to fortify the country's energy imports.

Libya joined the Belt and Road Initiative (BRI) in 2018.

== Political relations ==
Libya follows the one China principle. It recognizes the People's Republic of China as the sole government of China and Taiwan as an integral part of China's territory, and supports all efforts by the PRC to "achieve national reunification". It also considers Hong Kong, Xinjiang and Tibet to be China's internal affairs.

== Military relations ==
In 1970, Gaddafi and his Prime Minister Abdessalam Jalloud made an unsuccessful attempt to convince China to sell tactical nuclear weapons to Libya. In a bilateral meeting with Chinese Premier Zhou Enlai, Gaddafi unsuccessfully attempted to convince Zhou to sell him a nuclear bomb. Investigators have found that nuclear weapons designs obtained by Libya through a Pakistani smuggling network originated in China.

Libya used its relationship with China in 1978 as leverage in Libya's relationship with the USSR. During the height of Sino-Soviet conflict, potential growing Chinese involvement in North Africa and the Middle East helped persuade the USSR to supply Libya with missiles, submarines, and other forms of military equipment. Between 1980 and 1985, however, China equipped Libya with approximately $320 million worth of military equipment, reigniting Chinese interest in the Middle East and North Africa.

On 5 September 2012, Libyan NTC spokesman Abdulrahman Busin said the NTC had hard evidence that Gaddafi bought arms from China. Chinese Foreign Ministry spokeswoman Jiang Yu has confirmed arms sales talks with Gaddafi forces, but no arms were delivered.

== Chinese migrants in Libya ==
After China and Libya established diplomatic relations in 1978, a number of Chinese migrants moved to Libya. These migrants often came because of agreements between the two countries that produced jobs in the areas of medicine, economics, culture, and agriculture. Chinese construction companies’ work in Libya was an additional reason for the inflow of Chinese migrants.

The presence of Chinese migrants in Libya has ebbed and flowed since 1978, which is partly due to UN sanctions imposed on Libya in 1992, which negatively impacted the economy. These sanctions were lifted in 2003, at which point some Chinese entrepreneurs and traders wanted to participate in the Libyan economic market.

Chinese migration to Libya increased again in 2007 as a result of lifting sanctions and contracts between China and Libya. These migrants generally fell into four categories: temporary laborers, white-collar workers, private entrepreneurs, and Muslim students.

Temporary laborers worked on infrastructure projects and their contracts often lasted for two years. White-collar staff often stayed in Libya for three months to a year, and then returned to China. Examples of white-collar occupations include managers, translators, secretaries, accounts, and engineers. Laborers and white-collar workers were often male. The Chinese women who did migrate to Libya often worked as accountants, interpreters, or secretaries.

Private Chinese entrepreneurs made up a small proportion of the Chinese migrants. Their work was made possible by the presence of other Chinese migrants, as these entrepreneurs created businesses such as Chinese restaurants and Chinese food workshops that catered to the desires of other Chinese migrants.

The Chinese government began sending Muslim students to the World Islamic Call Society in Tripoli in the 1980s to allow these students to participate in Qur’anic studies. The number of students who were sent was small, approximately a few dozen each year. Many of these students chose to work as translators for Chinese companies in Libya.

Chinese migrants often lived in compounds with each other that were near the project sites where they worked. In the time migrants were not working, they still remained on the compounds, so there was often little interaction between Chinese migrants and the local Libyan population. Chinese companies also sought to “provide as Chinese an environment as possible,” meaning that they brought Chinese cooks and Chinese translators to further minimize the engagement that migrants had with Libyan culture.

Although their interaction with Libyan society on an interpersonal level was minimal, Chinese migrants influenced the Libyan economy, especially the retail sector. White-collar Chinese employees purchased luxury goods, including perfume, watches, and branded clothing, as the price of these goods was lower in Libya than it was in China.

As a result of the 2011 uprising in Libya, China evacuated over 30,000 people, greatly reducing the population of Chinese in Libya.

== Chinese development finance to Libya ==
From 2000 to 2012, there were 3 Chinese official development finance projects identified in Libya through various media reports. Three batches of humanitarian aid goods were delivered in 2011, an MOU of investment cooperation in the fields of transportation, farming, irrigation, fishing and the textiles, and a US$300 million low-interest loan to the LAP Green Network, a Libyan telecom firm in 2009.

== See also ==
- Sino-African relations
- Sino-Arab relations
