= China–Tunisia relations =

- Tunisia: China

Diplomatic mission
- Embassy of Tunisia, Beijing: Embassy Of China, Tunis

China–Tunisia relations are foreign relations between China and Tunisia. The People's Republic of China (PRC) established diplomatic relationship with Tunisia on January 10, 1964, 8 years after Tunisia got its independence.

== History ==
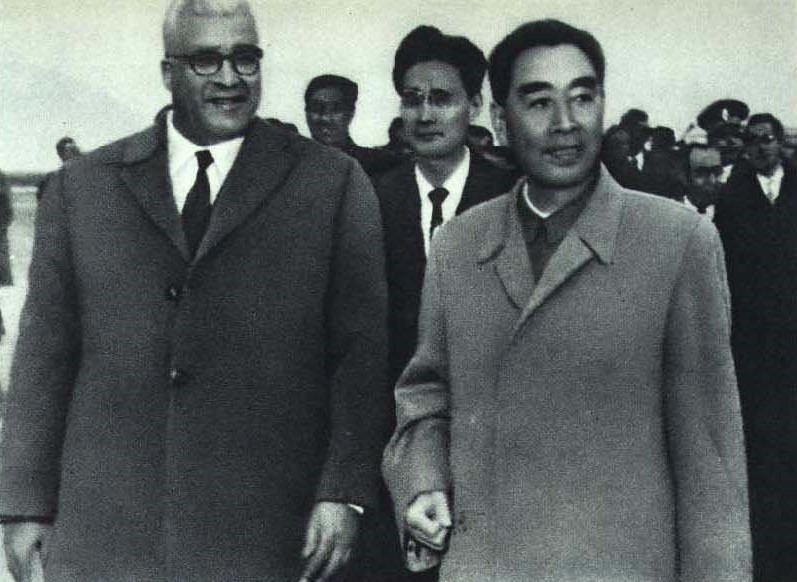
On January 9, 1964, Premier Zhou Enlai of the People's Republic of China visited Tunisia.

Tunisia, previously a French protectorate, attained official independence on March 20, 1956; before this, Zhou Enlai, then-Premier of the People's Republic of China, articulated his endorsement of the Tunisian quest for self-determination and independence at the Bandung Conference in 1955. Following Tunisia's establishment, Zhou Enlai contacted the Prime Minister of the Kingdom of Tunisia on April 4 of that year, extending heartfelt congratulations on Tunisia's independence; later, the Tunisian government extended an invitation for Zhou Enlai to visit the region. Habib Bourguiba and Zhou engaged in discussions, during which divergent viewpoints emerged. Bourguiba articulated his skepticism and apprehension regarding Zhou Enlai's assertions at the banquet honoring him. Zhou Enlai recognized that the two nations would not consistently concur but expressed a desire for Tunisia to maintain interactions and exchanges with the People's Republic of China to enhance mutual understanding.

The People's Republic of China and Tunisia formalized diplomatic ties in January 1964; nevertheless, these contacts were somewhat restrained owing to the Tunisian government's alignment with the United States. In late 1964 and the early part of 1965, Tunisian authorities endorsed the concept of "two Chinas" and denounced Chairman of the Chinese Communist Party Mao Zedong, alleged that China did not genuinely endorse peaceful coexistence among nations. Furthermore, subsequent to the Cultural Revolution, certain personnel at the PRC embassy in Tunisia employed aggressive publicity strategies, which antagonized the Tunisian authorities and prompted anti-Chinese remarks from senior government officials. Consequently, the PRC shuttered its embassy in Tunisia in 1967. In 1967, disagreements between the Tunisian government and the Chinese embassy resulted in the suspension of relations. Bilateral relations resumed in 1971.

During the 1970s, several nations started to establish diplomatic relations with the People's Republic of China, coinciding with a shift in Tunisia's political viewpoints. With the assistance of Mauritania, bilateral relations between the People's Republic of China and Tunisia were ultimately normalized, leading to the reopening of the Chinese embassy in Tunisia. Tunisia proposed that the People's Republic of China be represented in the United Nations under the designation "China," while the Republic of China maintains its representation under the name "Taiwan." Tunisia subsequently endorsed UN General Assembly Resolution 2758, which advocated for the People's Republic of China to replace the Republic of China in the United Nations.

Tunisia has adhered to the One-China policy and, like a majority of countries, recognizes the PRC as the sole legitimate government of "China" and Taiwan and all other islands controlled by the Republic of China (ROC) are recognized by Tunisia as part of PRC's territory as Tunisia does not recognize the ROC as legitimate.

In April 2002, Former Chinese leader Jiang Zemin had visited Tunisia, and signed a series of economic, technical and financial support along with cultural cooperation agreements.

In 2011, the Tunisian Revolution during the Arab Spring helped serve as an inspiration for the 2011 Chinese pro-democracy protests, with both protests unofficially named "Jasmine Revolution".

On February 16, 2017, Tunisia unilaterally permitted Chinese residents with regular passports to enter Tunisia without a visa for 90 days. On May 31, 2024, the two countries announced the establishment of the China-Tunisia Strategic Partnership during the state visit by Kais Saied to China.

Tunisia joined the Belt and Road Initiative (BRI) in 2018.

China has an extradition treaty with Tunisia.

=== 2024 state visit by Kais Saied ===
2024 state visit by Kais Saied to China
- Date: May 28 – June 1, 2024
- Venue: Beijing, China
- Organised by: Government of Tunisia; Government of China

From January 13 to 18, 2024, China'sdirector Office of the Central Foreign Affairs Commission Wang Yi was invited to visit Egypt, Tunisia, Togo and Côte d'Ivoire. On January 19, the Embassy in Tunisia held a reception to celebrate the 60th anniversary of the establishment of diplomatic relations between China and Tunisia, which was attended by Ambassador Wan Li.

On January 15, Tunisian President Said met with visiting Foreign Minister Wang Yi in Tunis. Same day, the inauguration ceremony of the Tunisian International Diplomatic Academy built with China's assistance was held, with President Saied personally inaugurating the academy, and Chinese Foreign Director Wang Yi attended the ceremony and delivered a speech.

From May 28 to June 1, 2024, Tunisian President Kais Saied paid a state visit to China at invitation of Chinese leader Xi Jinping, and attended the opening ceremony of the tenth Ministerial Meeting of the China-Arab States Cooperation Forum. On the morning of May 30, the opening ceremony of the 10th Ministerial Meeting of the China-Arab States Cooperation Forum was held at the Diaoyutai State Guesthouse in Beijing. President Said of Tunisia attended the opening session, in addition to President Sisi of Egypt, King Hamad of Bahrain, President Mohammed of the United Arab Emirates, etc.

On the morning of May 31, 2024, Chinese leader Xi Jinping held a welcome ceremony for Tunisian President Kais Saied at the Great Hall of the People before the two started a bilateral meeting. It was announced that China and Tunisia had established a strategic partnership. Based on the awareness of the two-State solution, the parties also reaffirmed their continuous dedication to a thorough, fair and long-lasting resolution of the Palestine question.

== Development projects ==
The People's Republic of China has assisted Tunisia in the development of projects including water conservation infrastructure, solar lighting initiatives, shrimp aquaculture centers, and cultural endeavors. The PRC has dispatched medical teams to Tunisia, who have visited local construction sites to offer volunteer medical care and therapies, including massage and acupressure, to Chinese workers and Tunisian natives at these locations.

From 2000 to 2011, there are approximately 15 Chinese official development finance projects identified in Tunisia through various media reports. These projects range from $4.6 million worth of in-kind humanitarian assistance to Tunisia in 2011, to a technical and economic co-operation agreement in 2011, and an in-kind grant of RMB30 million to construct two dams in the Tataouine Governorate in South Tunisia.

== Sovereignty issues ==
Tunisia follows the one China principle. It recognizes the People's Republic of China as the sole government of China and Taiwan as an integral part of China's territory, and supports all efforts by the PRC to "achieve national reunification". It also considers Hong Kong, Xinjiang and Tibet to be China's internal affairs.

== Resident diplomatic missions ==
- China has an embassy in Tunis.
- Tunisia has an embassy in Beijing.

== See also ==
- Foreign relations of China
- Foreign relations of Tunisia
- China-Arab States Cooperation Forum
