= List of ambassadors of Algeria to China =

Algerian official representative to China

Coordinates: 39.913028°N 116.448306°E

Ambassador of Algeria to China
- Incumbent; Vacant
- Inaugural holder: Abder Rahman Zniber
- Formation: April 28, 1962

The Algerian ambassador in Beijing is the official representative of the Government in Algiers to the Government of the People's Republic of China.

== List of representatives ==
| Diplomatic agrément | Diplomatic accreditation | Ambassador | Observations | President of Algeria | Premier of the People's Republic of China | Term end |
|---|---|---|---|---|---|---|
| January 1, 1958 | | The governments in Algiers and Beijing established diplomatic relations. | Ferhat Abbas | Zhou Enlai | | |
| April 28, 1962 | Zniber | Abder Rahman Zniber first ambassador of Morocco in Beijing. | Ferhat Abbas | Zhou Enlai | | |
| August 6, 1964 | M'hamed Yala | From 1966 a 1972 he was Algerian ambassador in Vietnam. | Ahmed Ben Bella | Zhou Enlai | | |
| January 1, 1966 | Mohand Cherif Sahli | * In 1971 he was ambassador in Prague | Zhou Enlai | 1971 | | |
| July 17, 1971 | Taleb Bendiab Chaïb | Taleb Bendiab Chaib | Houari Boumedienne | Zhou Enlai | 1974 | |
| April 30, 1975 | Mohamed Messaoud Kellou | | Houari Boumedienne | Zhou Enlai | 1977 | |
| January 1, 1978 | Ali Abdallaoui | | Rabah Bitat | Hua Guofeng | 1982 | |
| January 1, 1982 | Abdelkrim Gheraïeb | (* July 30, 1935 in Tébessa).: He had his secondary education in the French Institute - Constantine Muslims and won Algiers to attend courses at the Institute of Islamic Higher Education and the Institute for Political Studies.; In 1965, after teaching Arabic, she became a member of the executive of the Amicale des Algériens en Europe (Association of Algerians in Europe).; From 1968 to June 1979 he was president of the Amicale des Algériens en Europe, following Guennez M. Mahmoud.; In 1977, he was elected a member of Tebessa and in January 1979 became a member of the Central Committee of the National Liberation Front (Algeria), elected by the Fourth Congress.; The June 1, 1979 was appointed Algerian Ambassador to Sudan.; From June 1979 to August 1, 1982 was Algerian Ambassador to Iran.; In 1980 was the first diplomate visiting the hostages in the Iran hostage crisis.; From 1985 to August 31, 1986 was Algerian Ambassador to Lebanon.; From August 31, 1986 to December 12, 1989 was ambassador to Algerian Ambassador to Saudi Arabia.; He was an ambassador in London.; From 1997 to 2002 he was Algerian Ambassador to Mali.; From 2005 to 2008 he was Algerian Ambassador to Mali and mediator in the Tuareg rebellion (2007–2009). | Chraieb Abdelkrim | Chadli Bendjedid | Zhao Ziyang | 1984 |
| September 24, 1984 | Akbi Abdelghani | On September 1, 1986 was appointed Algerian Ambassador to Mali. | Chadli Bendjedid | Zhao Ziyang | August 31, 1986 | |
| August 31, 1986 | Lazhari Cheriet | From 1983 to 1984 he was director of Radio Algeria. | Chadli Bendjedid | Zhao Ziyang | September 20, 1989 | |
| October 1, 1989 | Mourad Bencheikh | | Chadli Bendjedid | Li Peng | | |
| September 1, 1995 | Khalfa Mameri | | Liamine Zéroual | Li Peng | September 15, 1995 | |
| October 1, 2005 | Djamel Eddine Grine | | Abdelaziz Bouteflika | Wen Jiabao | | |
| February 14, 2011 | Hassane Rabehi | In 2004 he was Algerian Ambassador to Ghana. | Abdelaziz Bouteflika | Wen Jiabao | March 2016 | |
| May 17, 2016 | Ahcene Boukhelfa | | Abdelaziz Bouteflika | Li Keqiang | March 2023 | |

- Algeria–China relations
