= China–Lebanon relations =

- China: Lebanon

Diplomatic mission
- Embassy of China, Beirut: Embassy of Lebanon, Beijing

Envoy
- Ambassador Wang Kejian: Ambassador Milia Jabbour

China–Lebanon relations (Chinese: 中黎关系; pinyin: Zhōng lí guānxì; Arabic: العلاقات الصينية اللبنانية), also referred to as Sino-Lebanese relations, refer to the bilateral relationship between China and Lebanon.

While initially hostile due to Lebanon's more "West-leaning" ties in the 1950s, relations between Lebanon and China were first established in 1971, with Lebanon becoming one of the first countries to form formal ties with China. The first Confucius Institute in the Middle East was opened in Lebanon in 2006. In 2013, China became Lebanon's top trading partner, accounting for 40% of Lebanese imports.

== History ==
=== Initial hostility and first relations (1949–1972) ===
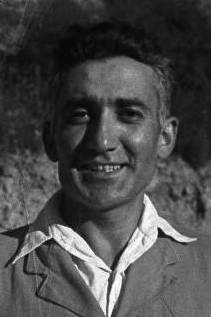
Ma Haide in 1944

Lebanese-American doctor Ma Haide (born George Hatem), was the first foreigner to become a citizen of the newly formed People's Republic of China in 1949; he was the only Westerner to fight for the Chinese Red Army.

Lebanon did not recognise the Chinese Communist Party (CCP) as the central authority of the People's Republic of China following its formation in 1949. China, who backed the North Korean troops against the US forces in the Korean War in 1951, was labelled an "aggressor" by Lebanon following their intervention. In the 1950s, Lebanon's relations with China were hostile, as they looked to strengthen ties with the West and the US. Following the Bandung Conference in 1955, China and Lebanon negotiated a trade agreement; this was the first sign of positive relations between the two countries.

The two countries first established diplomatic relations on 9 November 1971; Lebanon became one of the first countries to formally establish relations with China. In 1972, China opened a branch of the National Bank of China in Beirut, Lebanon. Later that year, a trade agreement was established, following a visit to Beijing by the Lebanese Minister of Foreign Affairs, Khalil Abou Hamad. Due to the outbreak of the Lebanese Civil War, further developments in the relations between the two countries were delayed until the early 2000s.

=== Growth in relations and formal deals (2004–2018) ===
Lebanon is a member of the multilateral cooperation group between China and the Arab States, the China–Arab States Cooperation Forum (CASCF), formed in 2004. The Arab countries coordinate their activities with CASCF through the Arab League. This facilitates coordination on collective projects like railway and nuclear power projects, and provides a way for the Arab countries to present a unified voice in their dealings with China. CASCF areas of cooperation include political issues, including Lebanon and Syria's respective territorial disputes with Israel.

In 2005, China and Lebanon signed a tourism cooperation deal, which intended to increase investment in reciprocal touristic sectors. China opened the first Confucius Institute in the Middle East at Saint Joseph University in Beirut in 2006. It has been regarded as "an important platform for teaching Chinese language and disseminating Chinese culture in Lebanon" by the Ministry of Foreign Affairs of the People's Republic of China.

During the 2006 Lebanon War, China evacuated 167 of its citizens from Lebanon. In line with China's policy of non-interference, Liu Zhenmin, Deputy Permanent Representative of China to the United Nations, criticised both Israel and Hezbollah's actions in the war. China's Special Envoy on the Middle East Issue at the time, Sun Bigan, heavily criticized Israel for its disproportionate use of force, and stated that the UN resolutions being drafted at the time must take into account the views of Lebanon and the Arab countries. Also in 2006, Sun attended an international conference on Lebanon's reconstruction and China provided 150 tons of humanitarian assistance to Lebanon, including food, medicine, and electric generators. In 2008, CASCF documents highlighted solidarity and economic and political support to Lebanon. In 2010, CASCF called for implementation of the UN Security Council resolution on occupied territory in southern Lebanon. Qian Minjian, China's Ambassador to Lebanon, stated in 2012: "When it comes to the conflict with Israel, there is no doubt that Israel is the one occupying Lebanese land".

China became Lebanon's top trading partner in 2013, following a steady increase in two-way trade from the level of 2012. Indeed, China supplied 40% of Lebanese imports. In November 2013, vice chairperson of the Chinese People's Political Consultative Conference (CPPCC) Luo Fuhe attended the reception marking the 70th Lebanese Independence Day. In 2016, Lebanese diplomats expressed their support for China's position on its territorial disputes in the South China Sea. Also in 2016, China provided aid to Lebanon in order to assist Lebanon in helping Syrian refugees. Since 2016, China's Special Envoy on the Syrian Crisis Xie Xiaoyan has met regularly with Hezbollah about Syria, discussing efforts to fight terrorism in Syria and the importance of reaching political solutions.

Lebanon joined the Belt and Road Initiative (BRI) in 2017. On 10 July 2018, CCP general secretary Xi Jinping pledged to provide CN¥600 million ($91 million) in financial aid to Jordan, Lebanon, Syria and Yemen, as part of a model to revive economic growth in the Middle East.

China–Lebanon trade trend chart (1995–2012)
Products exported from China to Lebanon

Products exported from Lebanon to China

=== Chinese aid in the Lebanese crisis (2019–present) ===
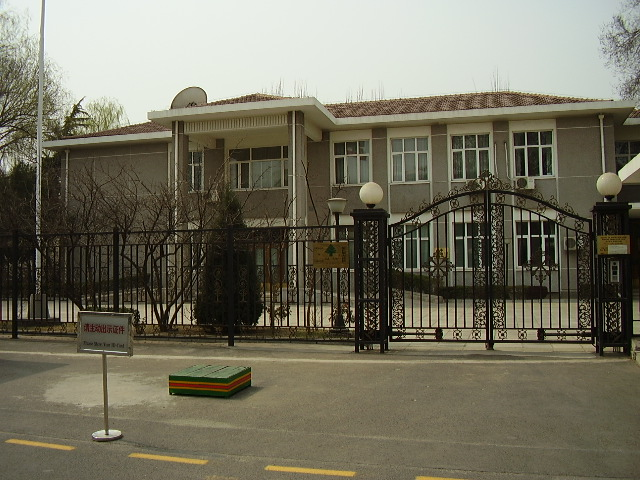
Embassy of Lebanon in Beijing, China

From 2000 to 2014, Lebanon had received US$20 million in aid from China. Following Lebanon's liquidity crisis since 2019, its government has looked to China for economic investments, an approach strongly supported by Lebanese political party and militant group Hezbollah. Lebanese Prime Minister Hassan Diab stated in 2020 that China had offered to help end Lebanon's electrical power crisis through its state companies. The Chinese government also offered to build power stations, a tunnel, and a railway. Lebanese economist Hasan Moukalled valued the offered project at $12.5 billion. The Lebanese port city Tripoli has been seen as an important link in China's Belt and Road Initiative.

This potential for further cooperation, though, has been viewed as coming at the cost of Lebanon's historic ties with the United States, due to rising tensions between China and the United States. Hezbollah, known for their anti-Americanism, have advocated for a bigger role for China in Lebanon. Contrary to the United States, China does not view Hezbollah as a terrorist organisation, rather as a "legitimate effort of the Lebanese to protect their country and preserve its sovereignty".

Lebanon was also among the 53 countries supporting China's Hong Kong national security law at the United Nations on 30 June 2020. In September 2021, on the 50th anniversary of the establishment of the bilateral relations between the two countries, Chinese leader Xi Jinping and Ambassador to Lebanon Qian Minjian further stressed China's assistance and cooperation with Lebanon.

== Resident diplomatic missions ==
- China has an embassy in Beirut.
- Lebanon has an embassy in Beijing.

== See also ==
- Sino-Arab relations
- Foreign relations of China
- Foreign relations of Lebanon
- Economy of Lebanon
