= Algeria–China relations =

- Algeria: China

Diplomatic mission
- Algerian Embassy, Beijing: Chinese Embassy, Algiers

Envoy
- Ambassador Ahcène Boukhelfa: Ambassador Li Jian

Algeria and the People's Republic of China (PRC) have traditionally strong relations, celebrating the 60th anniversary of the establishment of diplomatic relations in 2018. The Front de Libération Nation (FLN) received early support from the PRC, which was the first non-Arab country to recognise its provisional government in 1958.

In 2010, relations were considered the strongest of all Arab-Chinese relations behind Sudanese-Chinese relations. While relations are firmly grounded in commercial ties, diplomatic relations have notably extended into socio-cultural and political spheres.

In 2004, the two countries signed a strategic partnership and in 2014, elevated the Sino-Algerian bilateral relationship to a "Comprehensive Strategic Partnership," the first of its kind in the Sino-Arab world. Chinese top political advisor, Yu Zhengsheng, stated the goals of this partnership were to "enhance exchanges at all levels, cement political mutual trust and promote pragmatic cooperation" between the two nations. In 2018, Chinese Communist Party general secretary Xi Jinping echoed similar rhetoric, pledging to help promote further development of the partnership and continue the trend towards closer diplomatic ties.

== History of diplomatic relations ==
Algeria–China relations have played an important role amidst the backdrop of Algeria's turbulent 20th century history. Algeria's struggle for independence from France in the 1950s was, in many ways, rooted to the rise of a socialist political philosophy as a welcomed alternative to the perceived oppressive nature of the liberal-capitalist French state. China was an early supporter of the Front de Libération Nation (FLN) – the socialist revolutionary party which continues to dominate Algerian politics today.

The early relationship between FLN members and the People's Republic of China resulted in mutual benefits. China took a strong rhetorical stance in support of the FLN and provided it with arms. According to researcher Kyle Haddad-Fonda, the association gave "ideological credibility" to the burgeoning Algerian FLN and helped to garner support and solidify their regional reputation. On the other hand, China was permitted to "champion a revolutionary cause" in line with their socialist ideology – expanding their sphere of influence into the Maghreb region while maintaining an ultimately politically passive role which did not overtly threaten Algeria's sense of independence.

China was the first non-Arab country to recognise the FLN as Algerian provisional government in December 1958. China's foreign policy continued to follow a similar style of passive support in the region, providing economic investment – filling the gaps as Western nations started pulling out of the unstable region - while avoiding military intervention. For example, between 1958 and 1962, China provided assistance to the Armée de Libération Nationale – the armed wing of the FLN – in the form of funds, arms and training for Algerian officers, forms of practical support that avoided an obvious influx of Chinese military. For this reason, some commentators have suggested the Sino-Algerian relationship took the form of an "illusory alliance" rather than a military one.

The involvement of China was welcomed by Algeria. The Algerian Foreign Minister, Abdelkader Messahel, remarked in a 2018 speech on "the vital contribution that China has brought to the Algerian revolution (1954-1962) to help it regain its independence. The unwavering support of China continued as it was the first country to recognise the Provisional Government of the Algerian Republic (GPRA) a few weeks after its proclamation in September 1958."

After Algeria gained independence in 1962, China continued to ‘fill the void’ left by Western nations. China provided material support, including immediately dispatching a medical team, donating shipments of wheat, laminated steel, school equipment, a 13,000-ton freighter, and four transport aircraft and alleviating financial burden by extending a $50 million low-interest loan.

During the Cold War, Algeria emerged as a leader of the Third World and a beacon of anti-colonialism and national liberation movements in Africa. According to Derek Mitchell, China's foreign policy was based on a "solidarity with the 'third world' to distinguish itself from the bipolar Cold War rivalry between the United States and the Soviet Union." China was attempting to compete with the hegemonic influence of Soviet Union and the West in Algeria, and Algerian policy became a key source of conflict in the competition between China and the Soviet Union.

In the early 1960s, China sought to mobilize support of the Arab countries for a second Bandung Conference, proposed to be held in Algiers. The effort failed as a result of events including the 1965 Algerian coup d'état, the ouster of Sukarno in Indonesia, the 1966 Ghanaian coup d'état, and Egypt growing closer to the Soviet Union.

In the 1970s, the influential role of China in the North Africa region became apparent when China stepped in to mediate small-scale disputes between Algeria and regional competitor Morocco which threatened to disrupt the stability of the region. While the United Nations had tried and failed to resolve these conflicts, some commentators argue that it was China's good relations with the two countries and growing economic investment in the region which allowed China's involvement to be successful.

While China, historically, did dominate relations as a 'foreign power', the relationship between the two countries remained bilateral. In 1971, for example, Algeria played an important role in helping China to gain a seat at both the UN General Assembly and the UN Security Council.

In the 1990s – the "dark decade" dominated by the Algerian Civil War – China continued to provide aid in the form of military funding, such as US$100 million in arms, but avoided an overt military presence.

In 2004, Algeria and China signed a strategic partnership.

In 2014, the Sino-Algerian bilateral relationship was elevated to a "Comprehensive Strategic Partnership," the first of its kind in the Sino-Arab world.

At a ceremony celebrating the 60th anniversary of diplomatic ties between the two states, the Chinese Ambassador to Algeria, Li Lianhe, stated "these strong bilateral relations have been founded by the old generation, as they grew up to reach the level of Comprehensive Strategic Partnership, which is a great achievement in the process of fruitful progress of bilateral ties."

There is a sense of continued solidarity between Algeria and China which stems from both their historical association to the "Third World" and, now, their mutual sense of belonging to the "Developing World". Former Chinese Ambassador of RPC in Algeria, Liu Yuhe, declared in 2010, that despite differences in GDP, "China and Algeria remain developing countries."

== COVID-19 pandemic ==
At the beginning of the COVID-19 pandemic, Algeria sent urgent medical aid to Beijing in February 2020. In March 2020, China started to deliver tons of medical equipment to Algeria including respirators, medical protective clothes and screening kits.

In September 2021, Algeria started the production of Sinovac COVID-19 vaccine in cooperation with China.

== Economy ==
The importance of China's economic engagement with the North African region – and specifically with Algeria – could hardly be understated. Some researchers have described China as taking a "hegemonic role" in the region, and others have criticised China for pursuing "self-serving" economic policy of indiscriminate resource extraction. China has transitioned from being an external, often passive supporter of anti-colonisation movements into the preeminent economic partner of several African countries. Algeria is the North African country with closest economic ties with China, and on an African scale, ranks third behind South Africa and the Democratic Republic of Congo. Notably, China has achieved this influential role not through military campaigns or colonisation but through infrastructure and economic development projects.

Algeria joined the Belt and Road Initiative (BRI) in 2018.

=== Development projects ===
Countries which signed cooperation documents related to the Belt and Road Initiative

From 2000 to 2011, there were approximately 9 Chinese official development finance projects identified in Algeria. These projects range from an offer of a preferential loan of about US$48 million in 2004, to the construction of an Opera House at a total cost of 300 million yuan in 2010.

Between 2001 and 2016, China has transformed from barely registering in Algeria's foreign trade to overtaking France as Algeria's number one source of imports.

In 2018, China donated US$28.8 million to Algeria as part of an agreement to improve Algerian-Chinese economic and technical cooperation.

On August 22, 2023, China and Algeria bolster cooperation in security, defense, and the economy, emphasizing counter-terrorism, regional stability, and joint initiatives in sectors like aerospace and energy.

In August 2023, Algeria and China agreed to build 6,000 km of railway lines in Algeria.

=== Construction ===
A key factor leading to Algeria-China strong economic ties was the withdrawal of Western corporations from Algeria during the Algerian Civil War. When Algeria then embarked on a post-war reconstruction program, China was able to develop economic links with Algeria through heavy development of state infrastructure. These include the building of the new airport in Algiers, the Foreign Office, the Constitutional Court, the Olympic Stadium of Oran and the largest prison in Algeria.

Recently, Chinese companies have won the rights to two-thirds of the 1216-km east–west highway, projected to be the largest infrastructure project in Algeria at around US$11 billion, as well as the construction of what will be the third largest mosque in the world. In 2015, China provided Algeria with $38 million for the Opera of Algiers in 2015, considered to be a mostly symbolic gesture in support of Algerian design and cultural achievements.

=== Energy ===
Algeria's economy is dominated by the hydrocarbon sector, accounting for around 28% of GDP, 58% of government revenues and 98% of all exports. Algeria has two nuclear reactors, one of which is the Chinese-built El Salaam nuclear reactor. Nuclear energy offers an opportunity to diversify Algeria's energy supply and move beyond hydrocarbon dependence. However, initially, the potential for militarisation of nuclear reactors was a cause for concern among Western States. This led to close Sino-Algerian cooperation denouncing suggestions of impropriety, resulting in Algeria agreeing to ratify the UN Non-Proliferation Treaty in 1995.

=== Automobile industry ===
Another approach to diversifying Algeria's economy has come from the Algerian government's eagerness to have Chinese automaker companies invest in Algeria.

In 2008, China and Algeria established the Jiangling Economic and Free Trade Zone in Mostagenm, which focused on car assembly involving Chinese companies Jiangling Motors Group and Jiangxi Coal Corporation Group and their Algerian partner, Groupe Mazouz.

In 2009, the Complementary Finance Law adopter by Algeria requires foreign investors to have Algerian partners as majority shareholders. This was followed in February 2015 by an executive order requiring foreign car deals to establish assembly plants In Algeria itself, in attempts to attract foreign investment and stimulate local production.

=== Trade ===
The economic ties between Algeria and China are not limited to a one way flow from China to Algeria of investment and development. Bilateral trade has increased rapidly in recent years, and China has recently surpassed France as the premier supplier to Algeria. China's exports to Algeria are dominated by manufactured goods, while Chinese imports from Algeria are dominated by crude oil and petroleum products. This agreement meets rapidly developing China's need for raw materials, while in Algeria consumer goods from China have become indispensable to everyday life. There is the added advantage that this inflow of goods are not detrimental to the Algerian local production (which is virtually non-existent).

Algeria has recently joined the China-proposed Belt and Road Initiative which focuses on upgrading transport logistics platforms to cope with growing traffic from global trade. One aim of the government's strategy is to interconnect transport logistics platforms, reducing the cost of transporting goods. The Algerian Transport and Public Works Minister, Adelghani Zalene, stated that “we [the Algerian government] are glad to join the initiative, in which China will share its experience and know-hows with the African continent, including Algeria, as part of a global developing process.”

Algeria buys some of its military equipment from China.

== Political relations ==
Algeria follows the one China principle. It recognizes the People's Republic of China as the sole government of China and Taiwan as an integral part of China's territory, and supports all efforts by the PRC to "achieve national reunification". It also considers Hong Kong, Xinjiang and Tibet to be China's internal affairs.

China's diplomatic policy in Algeria and in the Arab world is not clear cut. According to Alice Ecknman, China has no real position on the status of women, the state or religion. Algeria's foreign policy is driven by pragmatism. According to François Lafargue, “Algeria plays a subtle game between Washington, Paris, Moscow and Beijing. Algiers sees the United States as the power capable of helping them stabilize the region, France as a traditional trading and cultural partner, Moscow as an arms supplier, and Beijing as a diplomatic ally capable of accelerating its development without imposing constraints.”

In July 2019, UN ambassadors of 37 countries, including Algeria, signed a joint letter to the United Nations Human Rights Council defending China's persecution of Uyghurs. Algeria was one of 16 countries that defended China in 2019 but did not do so in 2020.

China takes an ambiguous standpoint with respect to the conflict between Algiers and Morocco over Western Sahara. Writing in 2023, David H. Shinn and academic Joshua Eisenman state that China's ambiguous policy in this area has constrained the development of security cooperation between Algiers and China.

== Space cooperation ==
China signed a space cooperation agreement with Algeria in 2016, although the country is not Algeria's primary partner for space cooperation. Algeria and China had previously signed a memorandum of understanding regarding space cooperation in 2007.

In 2013, the Algerian Space Agency (ASAL) purchased a geostationary communications satellite from China Great Wall Industry Corporation. China launched the satellite in 2017. Algeria controls its in-orbit operation, management, and applications from Algerian ground stations. The satellite provides broadcasting, emergency communications, remote education, and satellite broadband.

In January 2026, Algeria launched 2 military satellites from China, the first on January 15, the second on the 31st.

== Extradition ==
China has an extradition treaty with Algeria.

== Bibliography ==
- "Algeria to innovate in infrastructures as it vows to join China's Belt and Road Initiative". African Daily Voice. Archived from the original on 20 March 2019.
- La Chine en Algérie : Approches socio-économiques, sous la direction de Abderrezak Adel, Thierry Pairault et Fatiha Talahite, Paris, MA Éditions – ESKA, 2017
