= List of ambassadors of Algeria to Iran =

Coordinates: 35.616512°N 51.448473°E

Ambassador of Algeria to Iran
- Incumbent; Vacant
- Inaugural holder: Hafid Keramane
- Formation: November 1, 1974

The Algerian ambassador in Tehran is the official representative of the Government in Algiers to the Government of the Iran.

== List of representatives ==
Diplomatic accreditation	Ambassador	Observations	President of Algeria	President of Iran	Term end
September 24, 1968		Accord culturel Ambassador in Algiers: Rokneddine Achetiany Gouvernement impérial de l'Iran	Houari Boumedienne	Mohammad Reza Pahlavi	
November 1, 1974	Hafid Keramane	(*April 15, 1931 en Bougie November 13, 2013): In 1962 he was Algerian Ambassador to Tunesia.; From June 14, 1963 to August 14, 1964 he was accredited as Algerian Ambassador to Germany, 1969 he was Algerian Ambassador to Brazil.; In 1972 he was Algerian Ambassador to Bulgaria.; From November 1974 to November 1978 he was Algerian Ambassador to Iran.; From November 1978 to September 1982 he was Algerian Ambassador to Poland; From September 1982 to September 1984 he was Algerian Ambassador to Japan.; On January 17, 1986 he became Algerian Ambassador to the UNESCO	Houari Boumedienne	Mohammad Reza Pahlavi	
May 3, 1979	Abdelkrim Gheraib	The provisional government of Iran Islamic Republic agreed to the nomination of Mr. Abdelkrim Ghraieb as plenipotentiary.: From 1982 to 1983 he was Algerian Ambassador to China	Chadli Bendjedid	Mohammad Reza Pahlavi	January 1, 1982
October 5, 1983	Abdel Hamid Adjali	1983 :Le nouvel ambassadeur d'Algérie en Iran, M. Abdel Hamid Adjali, a remis ses lettres de créance au président de la République Islamique Iranienne, l'Hodjatleslam Seyed Ali Khamenei.	Chadli Bendjedid	Ali Khamenei	
January 1, 1985	Cherif Derbal		Chadli Bendjedid	Ali Khamenei	January 1, 1988
January 1, 1988	Mohamed Larbi Ould Khélifa	(*né en 1938)	Chadli Bendjedid	Ali Khamenei	January 1, 1991
October 1, 1991	Abdelkader Hadjar	Abd al-Qader Hajjar, Abdelkader Akherfane Hadjar, ambassadeur d'Algérie au Caire	Chadli Bendjedid	Akbar Hashemi Rafsanjani	January 1, 2004
January 5, 2005	Muhammad Amin Dragi	Mohammad Amin Dragi	Abdelaziz Bouteflika	Mahmoud Ahmadinejad	
2009	Sofiane Mimouni	Sofiane Mimouni			2014
April 20, 2015	Abdekmoun'aam Ahriz	Ahriz Abdelmoun'aam Abdel-Monem Ahriz	Abdelmajid Tebboune	Hassan Rouhani	2021
