= State visits by Jiang Zemin to Germany, Libya, Nigeria, Tunisia, and Iran =

2002 diplomatic event

State visit by Jiang Zemin to Germany, Libyan, Nigeria, Tunisia and Iran
- Date: April 8 to 22, 2002
- Venue: Berlin, Potsdam, Dresden, Wolfsburg, Tripoli, Abuja, Shiraz and Tehran
- Organised by: Government of Germany; Great Socialist People's Libyan Arab Jamahiriya; Government of Nigeria; Government of Tunisia; Government of Iran; Government of China

At the invitation of President Johannes Rau of the Federal Republic of Germany, Colonel Muammar Gaddafi, Leader of the Great Socialist People's Libyan Arab Jamahiriya, President Olusegun Obasanjo of the Federal Republic of Nigeria, President Ben Ali of the Republic of Tunisia, President Seyed Mohammad Khatami of the Islamic Republic of Iran, Chinese President and General Secretary of the Chinese Communist Party Jiang Zemin paid a state visit to these five countries from April 8 to 22, 2002. During the visit, China signed several cooperation agreements with the three countries, encompassing diverse sectors such as trade and economy, culture, agriculture, science and technology, education, oil and gas, telecommunications, and transportation.

== Germany ==
On the afternoon of April 8, Chinese leader Jiang Zemin arrived in Berlin plane and began the state visit to Germany. On April 9, German President Johannes Rau held a grand welcoming ceremony at the Presidential Palace to welcome Chinese President Jiang Zemin. President Johannes Rau and President Jiang held discussions on the political, economic, cultural, educational, legal, and environmental relations between China and Germany. Following their talks, the two countries signed an agreement on the mutual recognition of higher education degrees and a summary of discussions regarding the mutual establishment of cultural centers.

On April 10, President Jiang came to visit Potsdam and the Charlottenhof Palace where the Potsdam Declaration was signed. At noon, President Jiang attended a welcoming banquet hosted by the Ministerpräsident of the state Brandenburg, Manfred Stolpe, after which he visited the Sanssouci. President Jiang also attended and delivered a speech at a banquet held by the Asia - Pacific Committee of the German Economy in Berlin. He emphasized that in the 21st century, China's advancement of its third phase of modernization and the promotion of its western region development strategy will create new opportunities for enhancing economic and technical cooperation with other countries, including Germany. He also welcomed the international business community to engage in various forms of economic and technical collaboration in China.

On April 11, President Jiang left Berlin and arrived in Dresden, capital of Saxony, to continue his state visit to Germany. the Minister-President of Saxony Kurt Biedenkopf greeted him at the airport. On April 12, President Jiang arrived at Hannover Airport, where he was greeted by Sigmar Gabriel, the Minister-President of Lower Saxony. On the same day, President Jiang visited the assembly plant of Volkswagen in Wolfsburg. In the evening, President Jiang met with Sigmar Gabriel, and visited the historic old town of Goslar, Lower Saxony.

== Libya ==
On April 13-14, Jiang Zemin paid a state visit to the Great Socialist People's Libyan Arab Jamahiriya and held talks with Libyan leader Gaddafi. This was the first visit to Libya by a Chinese paramount leader.

On the afternoon of April 13, President Jiang held talks with Libyan leader Gaddafi and exchanged views on bilateral relations and the international and regional situation. Following their discussions, the two leaders attended the signing ceremony for several key agreements, including a Memorandum of Understanding on investment cooperation between China and Libya, a cooperation agreement between the China National Petroleum Corporation (CNPC) and the Libyan National Petroleum Corporation (LNPC), and an agreement on the implementation of a railroad cooperation contract between the two nations. In the evening, President Jiang attended a welcome banquet hosted by Gaddafi at the Azizia camp.

On April 14, President Jiang met with the staff of the Chinese Embassy in Libya, representatives of Chinese-funded organizations and international students. After the meeting, Jiang Zemin visited the Libyan National Museum. In the afternoon, the President Xi concluded his state visit and left Tripoli for Abuja to pay a state visit to Nigeria.

== Nigeria ==
On April 14-16, Jiang Zemin paid a state visit to the Federal Republic of Nigeria and held talks with Nigerian President Olusegun Obasanjo. This was the first visit to Nigeria by a Chinese paramount leader. On the afternoon of April 14, President Jiang arrived at Abuja International Airport. President Obasanjo held a grand ceremony to warmly welcome the visit of President Jiang and his wife Wang Yeping. That evening President Obasanjo held a grand welcome banquet.

On April 15, President Obasan had an in-depth communication with President Jiang on China-Nigeria politics, economy, culture, healthcare, transportation and infrastructure. The two sides issued the China-Nigeria Joint Communiqué. On the morning of April 16, President Jiang concluded his visit to Nigeria. Before their departure, President Obasanjo and his wife went to the hotel and accompanied President Jiang to the airport.

== Tunisia ==
In the afternoon of April 16, Jiang Zemin's plane landed at Tunis–Carthage International Airport in Tunisia. President Zine El Abidine Ben Ali and his wife, the first vice president of the Democratic Constitutional Rally Hamed Karoui, Prime Minister Mohamed Ghannouchi, Speaker of the Parliament Fouad Mebazaa, etc. at the airport to meet President Jiang and his wife Wang Yeping and his entourage. Vice Premier Qian Qichen and his wife Zhou Hanqiong accompanied the visit. During the visit, President Jiang and President Ali and other Tunisian leaders had an in-depth exchange of views on further strengthening bilateral relations and international and regional issues of common concern.

Following the talks, the two sides signed seven key agreements: the Agreement on Economic and Technical Cooperation for China's provision of interest-free loans to Tunisia, the Economic and Technical Cooperation Agreement between China and Tunisia, the Maritime Transportation Agreement, the Civil Air Transportation Agreement, the Agreement on Avoiding Double Taxation and Preventing Fiscal Evasion, the Agreement on Implementing Cultural Cooperation for the Years 2002, 2003, and 2004, and the Protocol for Dispatching Chinese Medical Teams to Tunisia.

On April 18, President Jiang met with the Speaker of the National Assembly of Tunisia Fouad Mebazaa, and Prime Minister Mohamed Ghannouchi, respectively. At noon on April 18, President Jiang concluded his state visit to Tunisia and departed for Iran, the last stop on his five-country state visit.

== Iran ==
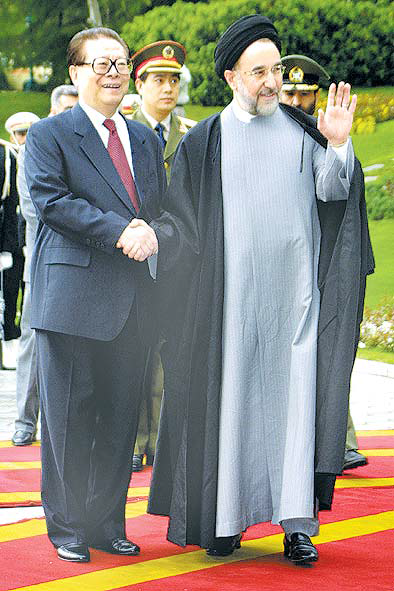
Khatami and Jiang Zemin on April 20, 2002

On the evening of April 18, Jiang Zemin arrived at Shiraz Airport in Shiraz, the capital of Fars Province in southern Iran, and began his visit to Iran. On the evening of April 19, President Jiang's plane arrived at Tehran's Mehrabad International Airport.

On the morning of April 19, accompanied by Iranian Deputy Foreign Minister Mohsen Aminzadeh, President Jiang visited the tomb of the Iranian poet Hafez. At noon, he met with Ansar Lari, the Governor of Fars Province of Iran.

On the morning of April 20, President Jiang attends a welcoming ceremony held by President of Iran Mohammad Khatami in Tehran before talks. They attended the signing ceremony of six cooperation documents after the talks. These include: China-Iran Double Taxation Avoidance Agreement; China-Iran Maritime Transportation Agreement; China-Iran Memorandum of Understanding on Cooperation in Postal, Communications and Information Technology; China-Iran Framework Agreement on Cooperation in Oil and Gas Sectors; Cooperative Agreement on Establishment of China-Iran Bilateral Business Council; and China-Iran Implementation Plan for Cultural Exchanges for the Years 2003-2005. On the afternoon, President Jiang met separately with Rafsanjani, Chairman of the Iranian Committee for Determining National Interests, and Speaker Karroubi. On the morning of April 21, President Jiang met with Iranian religious leader Ali Khamenei and the two sides had a friendly conversation.

On the evening of April 22, Jiang Zemin returned to Beijing after concluding his state visit to five countries in Europe, Asia and Africa. Vice President Hu Jintao, Vice Premier Li Lanqing, Vice Chairman of the Standing Committee of the National People's Congress (NPC) Jiang Chunyun, and Vice Chairman of the Central Military Commission (CMC) Zhang Wannian greeted President Jiang and his delegation at the Great Hall of the People.
