= Du Huan =

Chinese travel writer in Tang dynasty

Du Huan (simplified Chinese: 杜环; traditional Chinese: 杜環; pinyin: Dù Huán; Wade–Giles: Tu Huan, fl. 751–762) was a Chinese travel writer born in Chang'an during the Tang dynasty.

According to his writings, he was one of a few Chinese captured in the Battle of Talas in 751, along with artisans Fan Shu and Liu Ci and fabric weavers Le Wei and Lu Li. After a long journey through the Abbasid Caliphate (the 'Lands of the Tājīk', 大食), he returned by ship to Guangzhou in 762.

Following his return, he wrote his Jingxingji (lit. 'Records of Travels'), a work which has been almost completely lost. A few extracts survived in Tongdian under volume 192 and 193, an encyclopedia compiled by his uncle, Du You (735–812). The original text was reconstructed by Chen Yunrong in 1911. In the 8th century, Du You's encyclopedia quoted Du Huan himself on Molin (North or East Africa):

We also went to Molin, southwest of Jerusalem. One could reach this country after having crossed the great desert of Sinai and having travelled 2,000 li (approx. 1000 km). The People there were black, swarthy, and their customs are bold. There is little rice and cereals, with no grass and trees on this land. The horses are fed with dried fish, and the people eat Gumang. Gumang is a date. Subtropical diseases (Malaria) are widespread. After crossing into the inland countries there is a mountainous country, which gathered a lot of confessions here. They have three confessions, the Arab (Islam), Byzantine (Christianity) and Zimzim. The Zimzim practise incest, and in this respect are worst of all the barbarians. The followers under the confession of Arab have a means to denote in law, while not entangling the defendant's families or kins. They don't eat the meat of pigs, dogs, donkeys and horses; they don't respect (bow) either the king of the country, nor their parents; they don't believe in supernatural powers, perform only sacrifice to heaven (Allah) and to no one else. According to their customs, every seventh day is a holiday (Jumu'ah), on which no trade and no currency transactions are done, whereas when they drink alcohol, and behave in a ridiculous and undisciplined way during the whole day. Within the confession of the Byzantines, there are beneficent medical doctors who know diarrhea; they could either recognize the disease before its outbreak, or could remove the worms by opening the brain.

According to the historian Angela Schottenhammer, "Du Huan’s exceedingly positive description of the 'Lands of the Tājīk', coupled with the opportunities that he was granted during his travels, indicate that he was no traditional prisoner of war". Schottenhammer also points out that he is unlikely to have visited all the lands he included in his report, but that he provides a detailed description of life in Kufa,which was the capital of the Abbasid Caliphate before the foundation of Baghdad. His report may have served as a guide for the embassy of Yang Liangyao in 785, who went in the opposite direction, i.e. from Guangzhou via sea to the west.

== See also ==
- Sino-Arab relations
