= Sofiane Mimouni =

Algerian diplomat

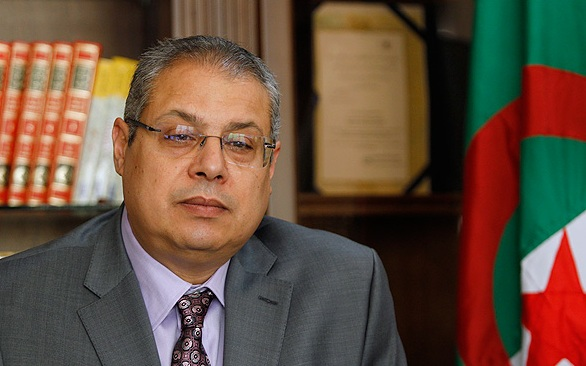
- Sofiane Mimouni as Algeria ambassador to Iran at his office in Tehran, 20 October 2014.
- Born: 1957 (age 68–69); Algiers
- Occupation: Diplomat

Sofiane Mimouni (born 1957, Algiers) has been the Permanent Representative of Algeria to the United Nations since October 2019. Director General for Africa at the Ministry of Foreign Affairs, from 2015 to 2019. He has also served as Algeria’s Ambassador to Iran from 2009 to 2014, Director‑General of the Asia-Oceania Department at the Ministry of Foreign Affairs from 2005 to 2009 and Ambassador to Indonesia, Australia, New Zealand, Singapore, Brunei Darussalam and Vanuatu from 1996 to 2004.

== Biography ==
He led several Algerian delegations to various international Conferences and meetings.

He has been elected Chairman of the Committee on Conferences of the General Assembly of the United Nations for the year 2020.

He has been also appointed in 2020 by the President of the General Assembly as co-facilitator of the intergovernmental process review of the functioning of the resident coordinator system and reconducted by the President of the General Assembly in 2021.

Mimouni earned a master's degree in law from the University of Algiers, a bachelor's degree from the High Institute of International Studies from the University of Paris and a postgraduate degree in international law from the University of Sorbonne in Paris.
