= Bahrain–China relations =

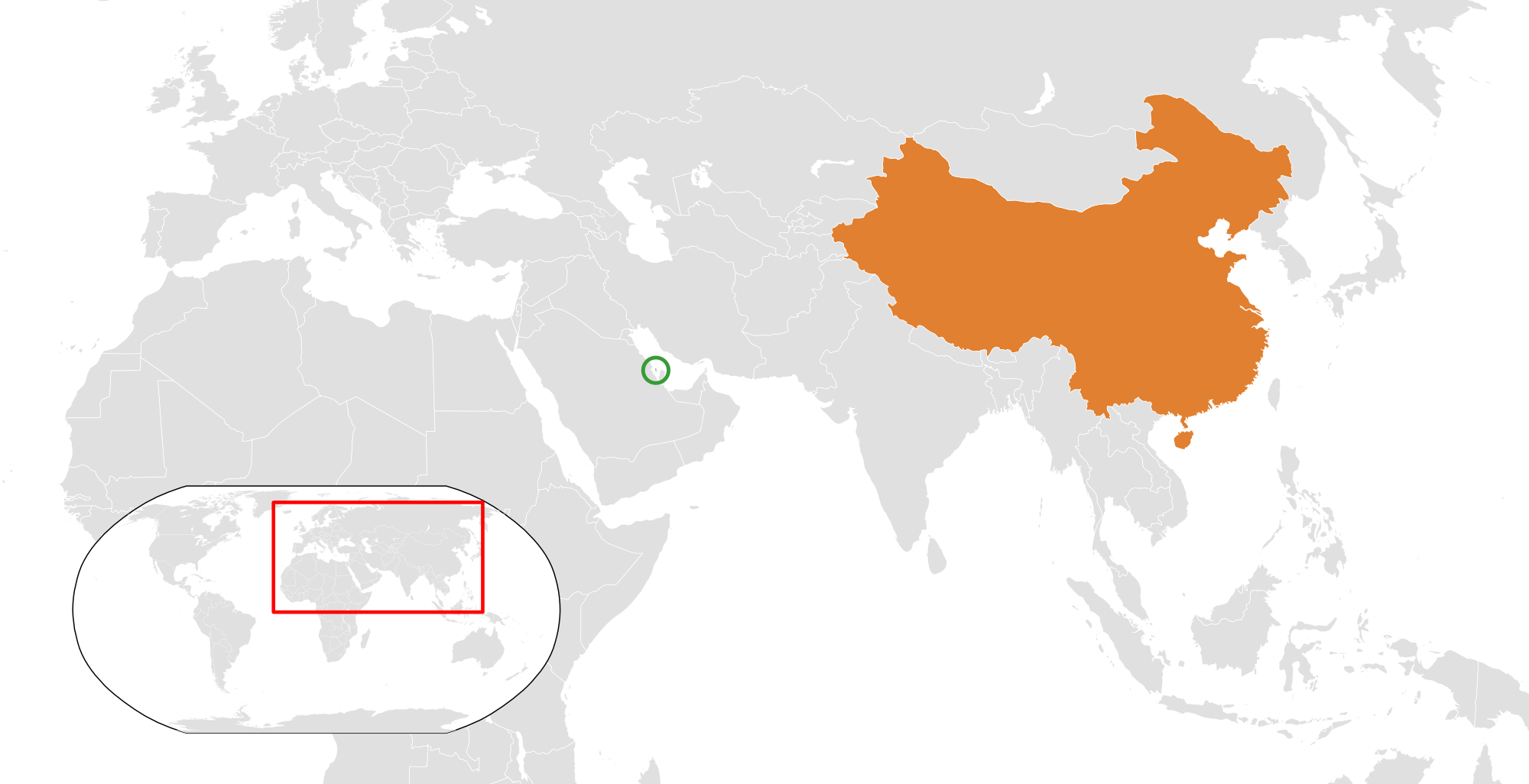

- Bahrain: China

Diplomatic mission
- Chinese Embassy, Manama: Bahraini Embassy, Beijing

Bahrain–China relations refer to the bilateral relations between the Kingdom of Bahrain and the People's Republic of China.

== History ==
On April 18, 1989, China and Bahrain formally established diplomatic relations. After the establishment of diplomatic relations, the relationship between the two countries developed smoothly. Bahrain's Prime Minister Khalifa visited China in 2002. On March 29, 2021, Chinese Foreign Minister Wang Yi arrived in Bahrain. Bahraini King Hamad hosted a banquet for Wang Yi. Subsequently, the Crown Prince of Bahrain and Prime Minister Salman met with Wang Yi in Manama. On the same day, Wang Yi held talks with Bahraini Foreign Minister Zayani. Both sides expressed their willingness to strengthen the connection between the 'Economic Vision 2030' and the "Belt and Road" initiative and expand cooperation between the two countries in trade, investment, energy, science and technology, infrastructure and other fields. Finally, the two sides signed the China-Bahrain Cultural Center Agreement and the Implementation Plan for Cultural Cooperation between the Two Countries. During the visit of the King of Bahrain to China in May 2024, China and Bahrain established a comprehensive strategic partnership.

== Economic relations ==
The economic relationship between the People's Republic of China and the Kingdom of Bahrain has grown steadily since the establishment of diplomatic relations on April 18, 1989. Over the years, the two nations have expanded their cooperation across sectors such as trade, investment, infrastructure development, and cultural exchange.

Bahrain joined the Belt and Road Initiative (BRI) in 2018.

=== Trade and investment ===
In 2022, the total trade volume between China and Bahrain reached approximately US$2.36 billion. China's exports to Bahrain were valued at around US$2.25 billion, while imports from Bahrain stood at US$110 million, with raw aluminum constituting a major portion of Bahrain's exports to China. China is Bahrain's largest import partner, supplying mechanical and electrical products, high-tech items, and textiles.

=== Strategic partnership ===
In May 2024, General Secretary of the Chinese Communist Party Xi Jinping and King Hamad bin Isa Al Khalifa announced the establishment of a comprehensive strategic partnership between China and Bahrain. The agreement aims to strengthen cooperation in energy, transportation, investment, renewable energy, and the digital economy. Both nations also emphasized expanding cultural and people-to-people exchanges.

=== Infrastructure and development projects ===
Chinese firms have participated extensively in Bahrain's infrastructure sector. The China Machinery Engineering Corporation and Power Construction Corporation of China have initiated projects valued at a combined US$1.42 billion, including major real estate and utilities developments. In January 2024, the first phase of a housing project in Sitra, providing nearly 3,000 units, was inaugurated.

=== Financial collaboration ===
In April 2024, Bahrain-based Investcorp, in partnership with China's sovereign wealth fund China Investment Corporation (CIC), launched a US$1 billion fund targeting high-growth sectors such as consumer goods, healthcare, logistics, and business services across the Gulf and China.

=== Cultural and educational exchanges ===
In 2014, the University of Bahrain established a Confucius Institute to promote Chinese language and culture. In addition, both countries have signed agreements to open cultural centers in their respective capitals, enhancing mutual understanding.

== See also ==
- Foreign relations of Bahrain
- Foreign relations of China
