= Jingxingji =

762 AD Chinese journey book

The Jingxingji (Chinese: 经行记; pinyin: Jīngxíngjì; Wade–Giles: Chinghsingchi; literally "Record of Travels") was a now lost journey book written by Du Huan shortly after he returned to China in 762 from the Abbasid Caliphate. Only about 1,511 words are being preserved under the Tongdian. It recorded about thirteen main countries, and a separated book was later published by Wang Guowei under the title of Guxingji Jiaolu from this source. Other parallel quotes can also be found from the Imperial Readings of the Taiping Era, Taiping Huanyuji, Tongzhi and Tongkao.

In 1866, a section with regard to the Byzantine Empire of the texts was being translated into English by Henry Yule. Since then, a few of the scholars such as Hirth (1885), Chavannes (1903), Shiratori (1904), Rockhill (1911) and Pelliot (1904 and 1929) carry on the translation and excerpt from the portion of the texts into their works. The texts has overall been held in high regard among the early Chinese scholars such as Zhang Xinglang, Feng Chengjun, Xiang Da and Bai Shouyi.
