= Sino-Soviet relations =

Diplomatic relationship between China and the Soviet Union

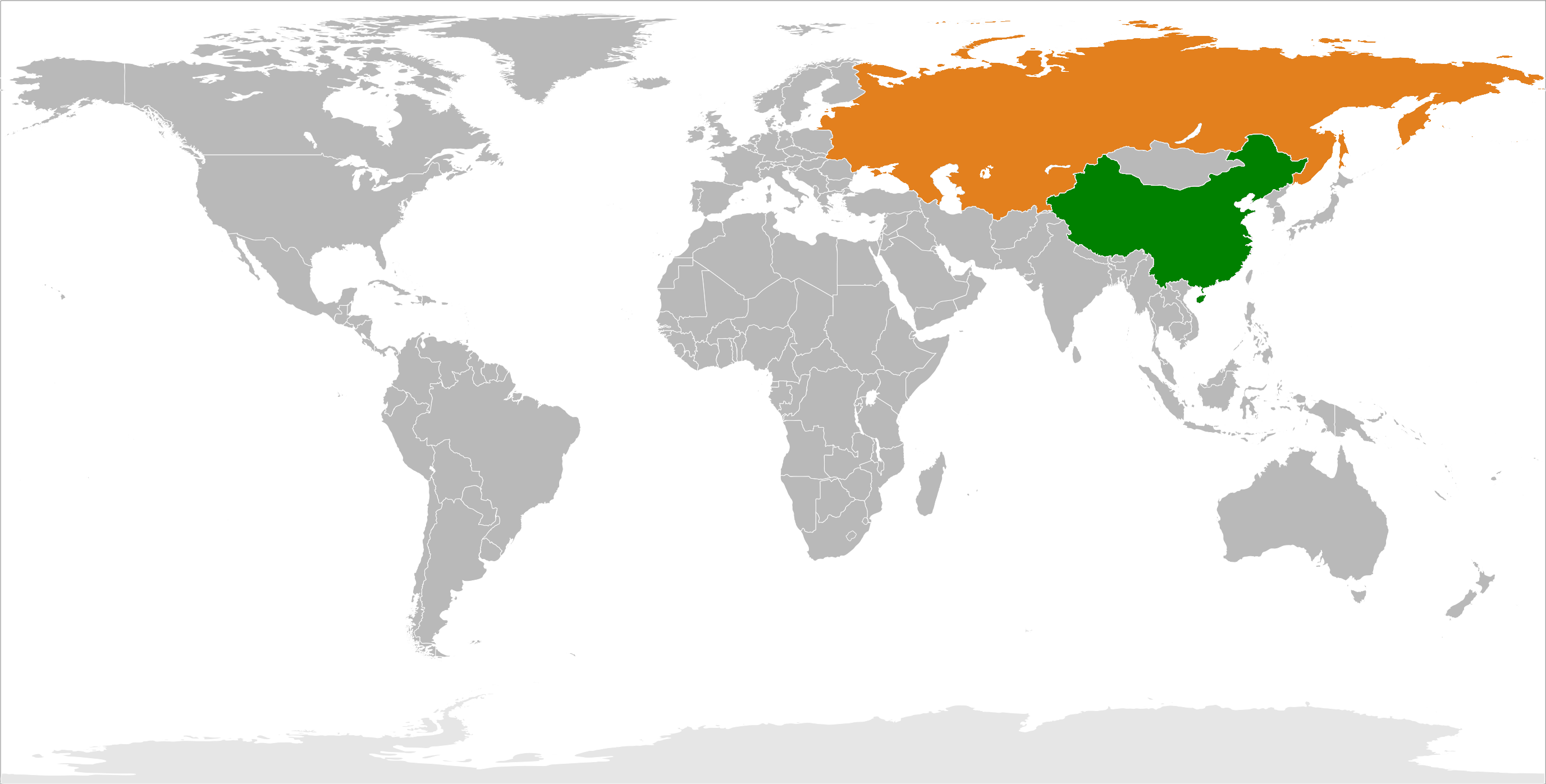

- China: Soviet Union

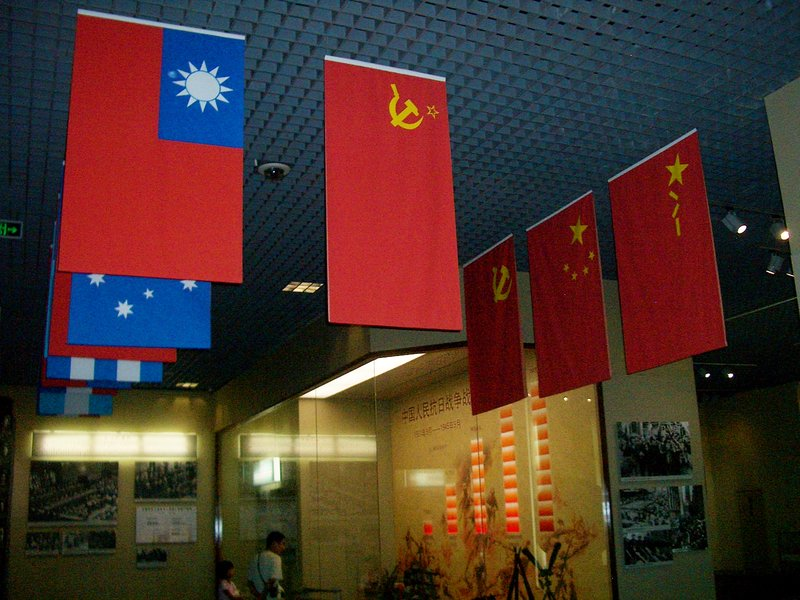
Inside the Museum of the War of Chinese People's Resistance Against Japanese Aggression, Beijing

Sino-Soviet relations (simplified Chinese: 中苏关系; traditional Chinese: 中蘇關係; pinyin: Zhōng-Sū Guānxì; Russian: советско-китайские отношения, sovetsko-kitayskiye otnosheniya), or China–Soviet Union relations, refers to the diplomatic relationship between China (both the Republic of China of 1912–1949 and its successor, the People's Republic of China) and the various forms of Soviet Power which emerged from the Russian Revolution of 1917 to 1991, when the Soviet Union ceased to exist.

In 1921, the Soviet Russia played an important role in supporting the establishment of the Chinese Communist Party (CCP) through the Communist International (Comintern), and decided to support the Kuomintang. The Soviet Union, established in 1922, ordered the CCP to enter into an alliance with the Kuomintang in 1923. The resulting First United Front launched the Northern Expedition, aiming to united China. In 1927, Kuomintang leader Chiang Kai-shek turned against the CCP, leading to the start of the Chinese Civil War; the Soviets offered some aid to the CCP. The Republic of China and the Soviet Union had a brief border conflict in 1929. The Soviet Union also invaded the Chinese province of Xinjiang in 1934, as well as another intervention in 1937 to support the pro-Soviet governor Sheng Shicai. After the beginning of the Second Sino-Japanese War in 1937, the Soviet Union signed a non-aggression pact with China and provided military help. In 1944, the Soviet Union sponsored the Ili Rebellion in Xinjiang. The Soviet Union eventually launched an invasion of Manchuria in 1945, which at the time was under Japanese occupation.

The two countries signed the Sino-Soviet Treaty of Friendship and Alliance, leading to ROC recognition of the Mongolian People's Republic, though the ROC later revoked the treaty. With the resumption of the Chinese Civil War and increasing success of the CCP, the Soviet leader Joseph Stalin decided to aid the CCP against the Kuomintang. CCP leader Mao Zedong proclaimed the People's Republic of China on 1 October 1949, followed by an immediate recognition by the Soviet Union, which emerged as the PRC's closest ally. The two countries signed the Sino-Soviet Treaty of Friendship, Alliance and Mutual Assistance in 1950. The Soviet Union sent significant military and economic aid to the new People's Republic, and the two countries backed North Korea during the Korean War. Relations began to deteriorate under Nikita Khrushchev, with Mao opposing Khrushchev's pursuit of closer relations with the West as well as what Mao called "Soviet revisionism", while Khrushchev opposed Mao's political and economic policies.

The deterioration eventually led to the Sino-Soviet split in 1961. This was followed by a rivalry between the two nations. including fighting in the Sino-Soviet border conflict in 1969 where the Soviet Union considered a preemptive nuclear strike on China; the border conflict led China to not renew its friendship treaty with the Soviet Union. The two countries also competed for the leadership of the international communist movement. The worsening of the relationship led China to improve relations with the United States in the 1970s. After Mao died in 1976, he was succeeded by Deng Xiaoping who initiated the reform and opening up. Though the relationship initially improved, China invaded Soviet ally Vietnam in 1979 after Vietnam had invaded Cambodia to oust the pro-Chinese Khmer Rouge from power. The relationship improved further under the leadership of Mikhail Gorbachev, who took office in 1985 and initiated economic and political reforms in the Soviet Union, with Gorbachev visiting Beijing in 1989 for the first summit between the two nations in since 1959. The Soviet Union dissolved in 1991, leading China to establish diplomatic relations with the Russian Federation.

== Republic of China ==
The Beiyang government in North China joined the Allied intervention in the Russian Civil War, sending forces to Siberia and North Russia beginning in 1918.

Mongolia and Tuva became contested territories. After being occupied by the Chinese General Xu Shuzheng in 1919, they came under the sway of the Russian White Guard General turned independent warlord, Roman von Ungern-Sternberg in 1920. Soviet troops, with support from Mongolian guerrillas led by Damdin Sükhbaatar, defeated the White warlord and established a new pro-Soviet Mongolian client state, which by 1924 became the Mongolian People's Republic.

Grigori Voitinsky played an important role in the establishment of the Chinese Communist Party (CCP) in July 1921 through the Communist International (Comintern). Moscow Sun Yat-sen University served as a training camp for Chinese revolutionaries from both the Kuomintang (KMT) and the CCP. In 1921, Soviet Russia began supporting the Kuomintang (KMT), and in 1923 the Comintern instructed the CCP to sign a military treaty with the KMT. On 31 May 1924, the two governments signed an agreement to establish diplomatic relations.

Sun Yat-sen welcomed the Soviet support, which assisted the KMT in fighting the northern warlords. From the Soviet perspective, its aid was consistent with the Soviet commitment to help revolutionary parties in other countries engage in national revolutions.

Sun's Soviet advisor Mikhail Borodin and his aides started Whampoa Military Academy in May 1924. The academy provided training for commanders who would be significant in both the KMT and the communist armies and provided a military edge over the less professionalized Chinese warlord armies. Soviet advisors were the academy's primary instructors.

In 1926, KMT leader Chiang Kai-shek abruptly dismissed his Soviet advisers and imposed restrictions on CCP participation in the government. By 1927, after the conclusion of the Northern Expedition, Chiang ended the First United Front between the CCP and Kuomintang, resulting in the Chinese Civil War which would last until 1949.

=== Sino-Soviet conflict of 1929 ===
The Sino-Soviet conflict of 1929 (Chinese: 中東路事件; Russian: Конфликт на Китайско-Восточной железной дороге, lit. 'Conflict on the Chinese Eastern Railway') was an armed conflict between the Soviet Union and the Chinese warlord Zhang Xueliang of the Republic of China over the Chinese Eastern Railway (also known as the CER).

The conflict was the first major combat test of the reformed Soviet Red Army, which was organized along the latest professional lines, and ended with the mobilization and deployment of 156,000 troops to the Manchurian border. Combining the active-duty strength of the Red Army and border guards with the call-up of the Far East reserves, approximately one in five Soviet soldiers was sent to the frontier, the largest Red Army combat force to be fielded between the Russian Civil War (1917–1922) and the Soviet Union's entry to the Winter War (1939–1940).

In 1929, the Chinese Northeastern Army took over the Chinese Eastern Railway to regain sole control of it. The Soviet Union quickly responded with a military intervention and eventually forced the Chinese to return the railway to the previous format of joint administration. During the conflict, the Soviets gained full control of the Tarabarov and Bolshoy Ussuriysky islands (Chinese: 银龙岛 and 黑瞎子岛 respectively) from China, and the military occupation of these islands continued until the 2004 Sino-Soviet Border Agreement, in which Russia agreed to return Tarabarov Island and the western half of Bolshoy Ussuriysky Island to China in 2008.

=== Second Sino-Japanese War ===
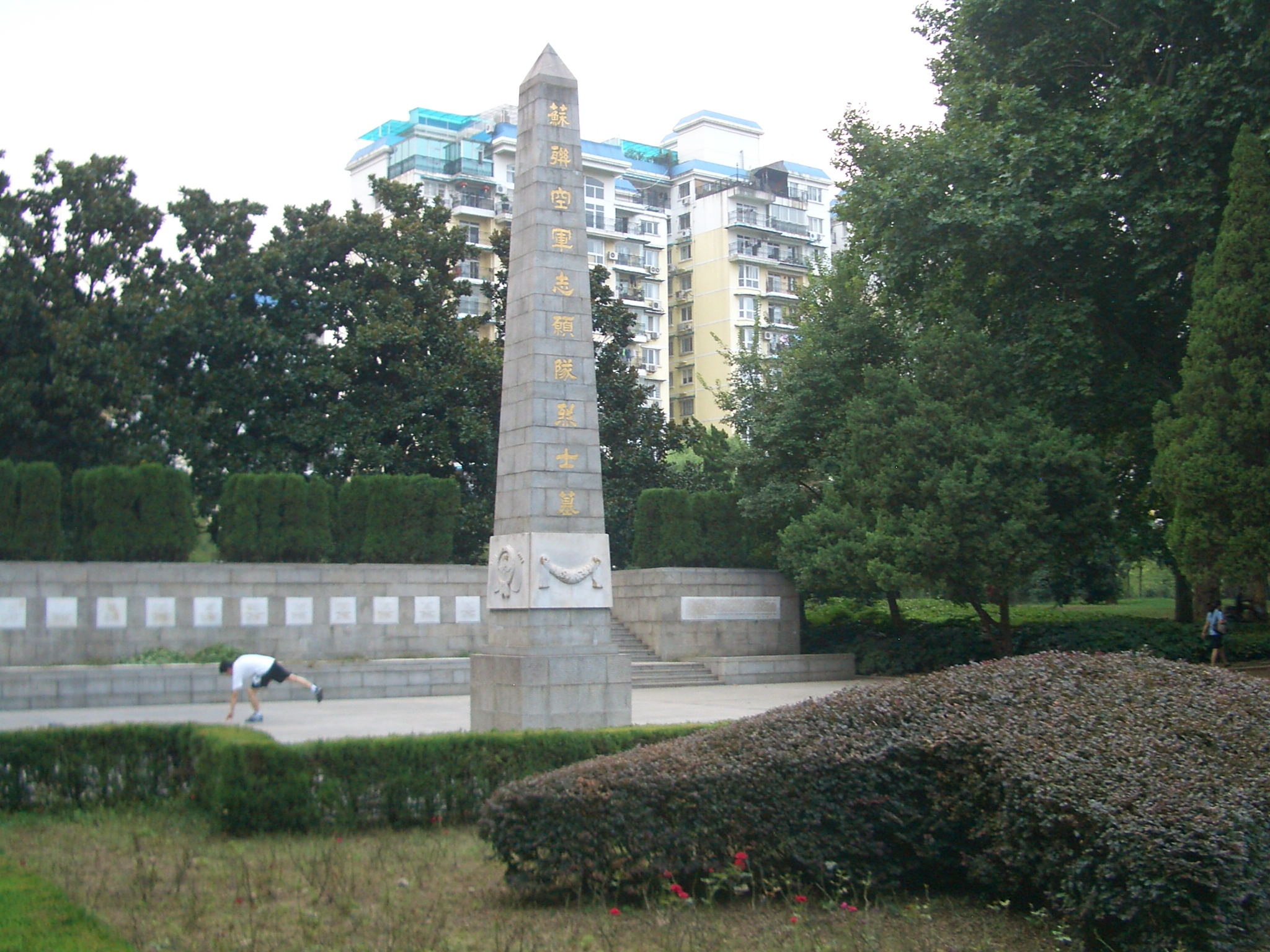
Monument to the Soviet Volunteer Airmen who died in defense of China from Japanese invaders. The unit was based in Wuhan in 1938

In 1931, Japan invaded Manchuria and created the puppet state of Manchukuo (1932), which signaled the beginning of the Second Sino-Japanese War. In August 1937, a month after the Marco Polo Bridge Incident, the Soviet Union established a non-aggression pact with the Republic of China. The Republic of China received credits for $250 million for the purchase of Soviet weapons. There followed big arms deliveries, including guns, artillery pieces, more than 900 aircraft and 82 tanks. More than 1,500 Soviet military advisers and about 2,000 members of the air force were sent to China. Soviet aid to the Nationalist government was halted after the signing of the Soviet–Japanese Neutrality Pact in April 1941. The CCP stated that the pact was "a great victory for Soviet diplomacy" and "was beneficial to liberation throughout China." Joseph Stalin viewed Japan as a potential enemy, and as a result offered no help to the CCP between 1937 and 1941, in order not to weaken efforts of the Nationalist government.

While the Republic of China was concentrating on the Second Sino-Japanese War, the Soviet Union supported Uyghur nationalists in their uprising in Xinjiang and set up Second East Turkestan Republic against the Kuomintang. After the CCP defeated the Kuomintang in 1949, the Soviet Union terminated support for the Second East Turkestan Republic. The Soviets tried to spread anti-Chinese propaganda among minorities in Xinjiang, but this backfired when Uyghur mobs attacked White Russians and called for them to be expelled from Xinjiang.

On 8 August 1945, three months after Nazi Germany surrendered, and on the week of the atomic bombings of Hiroshima and Nagasaki by the United States, the Soviet Union launched the invasion of Manchuria, a massive military operation mobilizing 1.5 million soldiers against one million Kwantung Army troops, the last remaining Japanese military presence. Soviet forces won a decisive victory while the Kwantung suffered massive casualties, with 700,000 having surrendered.

In late August 1945, Stalin proposed to Mao that the region north of the Yangtze river be ruled by the CCP and that the region south by ruled by the KMT. According to Wang Jiaxiang, China's first ambassador to the Soviet Union, Stalin was concerned by the independent streak of communist China and was concerned about the prospect of future competition with the Soviet Union. In September 1945, the CCP dispatched soldiers to Soviet-occupied Manchuria. The CCP obtained Japanese arms with Soviet help. The Soviet stance regarding the CCP and the KMT oscillated during this period, and in November 1945 the Soviet Union requested that the CCP withdraw from major cities in Manchuria.

After 1946, the CCP was increasingly successful in the Civil War. Until the late 1940s, the Soviet Union had hedged and supported both the CCP and the KMT. In late 1948, the Soviet Union committed fully to supporting the CCP. In May 1948, the Soviet Union had advised the CCP not to cross the Yangtze river with its army, but in April 1949 the CCP ignored this advice, and the People's Liberation Army launched a crossing of the Yangtze river and captured the KMT's capital city, Nanjing, in only a matter of days. On 30 June 1949, Mao stated that China would "lean to one side" in the Cold War era and favor the socialist camp over the capitalist camp. Mao announced that China must ally "with the Soviet Union, with every New Democratic Country, and with the proletariat and broad masses in all other countries".

== People's Republic of China ==
On 1 October 1949, the People's Republic of China was proclaimed by Mao Zedong, and by May 1950 the KMT had been expelled from Mainland China, remaining in control of Taiwan. With the creation of the People's Republic of China, the supreme political authority in the two countries became centred in two communist parties, both espousing revolutionary, Marxist–Leninist ideology: the CCP and the Communist Party of the Soviet Union. The day after the PRC's founding, the Soviet Union terminated its diplomatic relations with the KMT and recognized the PRC.

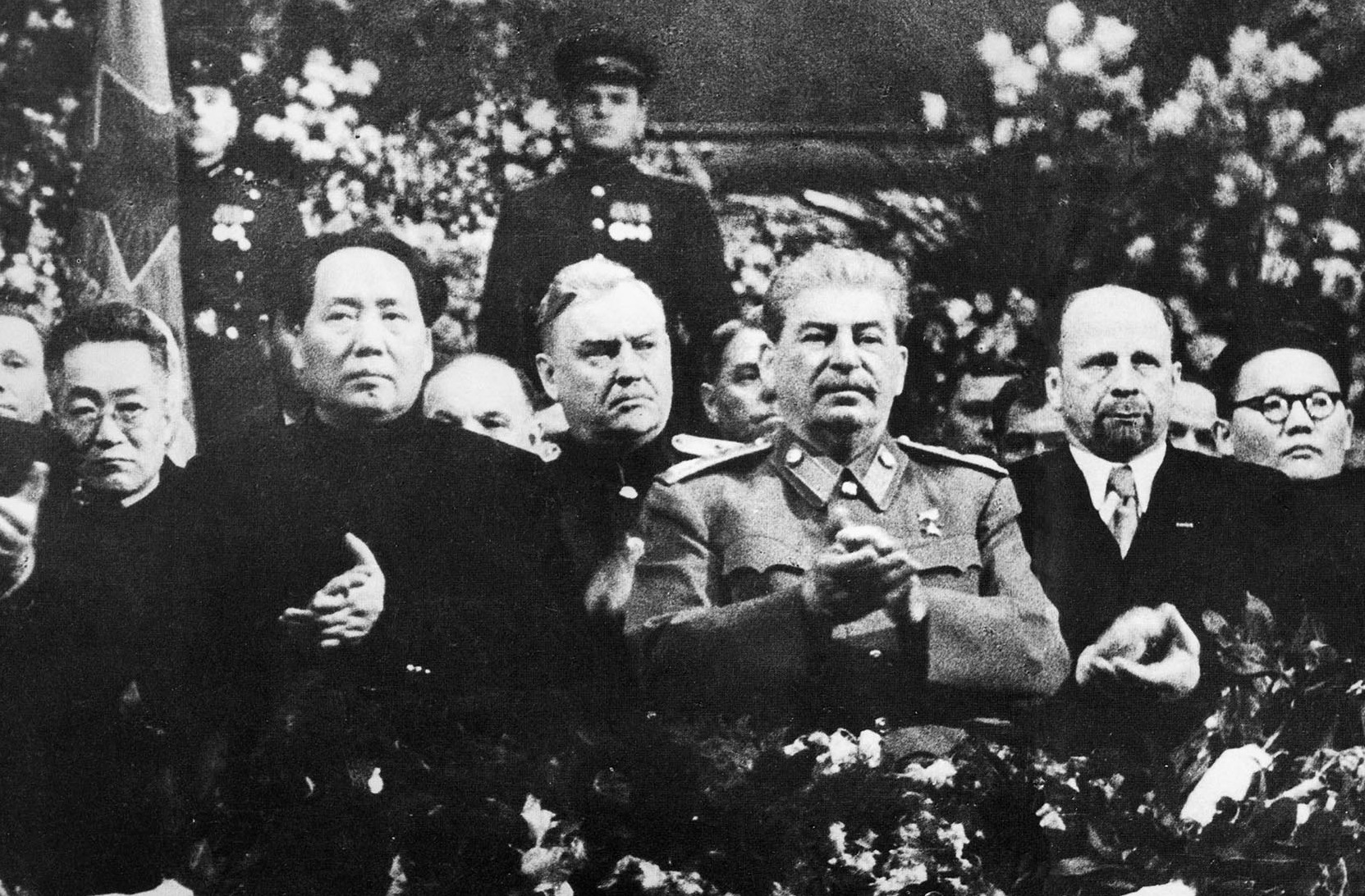
Mao (2nd left) visiting Stalin (2nd right) in Moscow, December 1949

In late 1949, Mao went to Moscow to seek economic help. Stalin kept him waiting for weeks, humiliating Mao in treatment worthy of a minor vassal. Stalin was focused on European matters and sought Mao's assistance in supporting the Vietnamese Communists against France in the First Indochina War. Mao accepted Stalin's view of a "worldwide communist revolution" and agreed to share "the international responsibility" and support the Vietnamese communists. After Mao's return to China, the country began sending military advisors and military aid to the Vietnamese. In the early PRC, Gao Gang and the Northeast People's Government had major roles in conducting the China's relations with the Soviet Union.

After the establishment of the People's Republic of China, a sensitive issue emerged. As a condition of fighting the Kwantung Army at the end of World War II, the Soviet Union received usage rights of the Chinese Eastern Railway, the South Manchuria Railway, Lüshun (also known as Port Arthur) and Dalian. These privileges were significant in the Asian strategies of the Soviet Union because Port Arthur and Dalian were ice-free ports for the Soviet Navy, and the Chinese Eastern Railway and the South Manchuria Railway were the essential arterial communications which connected Siberia to Port Arthur and Dalian. As Mao Zedong thought that the usage rights of the Chinese Eastern Railway, the South Manchuria Railway, the Port Arthur and Dalian were part of Chinese state sovereignty, he required the Soviet Union to return these interests to China, and this was a crucial part of the Sino-Soviet Treaty of Friendship. Joseph Stalin initially refused this treaty, but finally agreed with this treaty. However, the ports were not returned until after Stalin died.

Stalin allowed Kim Il Sung to launch the Korean War. However, both Kim Il Sung and Stalin did not consider that the United States would intervene into that war immediately, if at all. Kim Il Sung could not sustain the attack against the United States Army. When Kim Il Sung required military assistance from the Soviet Union and China, Mao agreed to send Chinese troops, but asked the Soviet Air Forces to provide air cover. As the two leaders distrusted each other, Stalin agreed with sending Chinese troops to Korea, but refused to provide air cover. Since without the air cover from the Soviet Union, Mao once considered that China did not send troops into Korea, and Stalin at one time decided to give up the Korea Peninsula. After much thought, Mao solely sent Chinese troops into Korea on 19 October 1950 under an extremely hard Chinese economic and military situation. This activity ultimately changed the Sino-Soviet relationship. After 12 days of Chinese troops entering the war, Stalin allowed the Soviet Air Forces to provide air cover, and supported more aid to China. Mao sending Chinese troops to take part in the Korean War was followed by large-scale economic and military cooperation between China and the Soviet Union, and the friendly relationship of the two countries changed from titular to virtual. In one less known example of the Sino-Soviet military cooperation, in April–June 1952 a group of Soviet Tupolev Tu-4 aircraft were based in Beijing to perform reconnaissance missions on United States fusion bomb tests in the Pacific.

In the immediate years after the PRC was proclaimed, the Soviet Union became its closest ally. Moscow sent thousands of Soviet engineers and workers, and trainloads of machinery and tools. During the 1950s, the Soviet Union was the largest supplier of machinery to Chinese industries. By the late 1950s, the Soviets had erected a network of modern industrial plants across China, capable of producing warplanes, tanks and warships. Moscow even provided some nuclear technology.

=== Sino-Soviet split ===
Mao deeply distrusted Nikita Khrushchev for abandoning the strict traditions of Lenin and Stalin. In the late 1950s – early 1960s, relations became deeply strained. By attacking Soviet revisionism, Mao consolidated his political struggle in Beijing and won over his opponents. Khrushchev ridiculed the failures of the Great Leap Forward and the people's commune movement. The Sino-Soviet split was marked by small scale fighting in the Sino-Soviet border conflict in 1969. Moscow considered a preemptive nuclear strike. That never happened, but the Soviets did encourage Uyghurs to rebel against China. More important, China launched its own bid to control communist movements around the world, and in most cases local communist parties split between the two sponsors, confusing fellow travelers and weakening the overall communist movement in the Third World. Beijing said the Soviet Union had fallen into the trap of social imperialism, and was now seen as the greatest threat it faced. Mao made overtures to Richard Nixon and the United States, culminating in the sensational 1972 Nixon visit to China.

=== Post-Mao era and stabilizing relations ===
In 1976, Mao died and the Gang of Four were overthrown by Premier Hua Guofeng. After a two-year continuation of Maoist orthodoxy, Hua was forced to cede power to Deng Xiaoping, who began a series of reforms intended to encourage ideological pragmatism. With the PRC no longer espousing the anti-revisionist notion of the antagonistic contradiction between classes, relations between the two countries became gradually normalized. In 1979, however, the PRC invaded Vietnam (which had, after a period of ambivalence, sided with the Soviet Union) in response to the Vietnam's invasion of Cambodia which overthrew the China-backed Khmer Rouge from power.

During the Sino-Soviet split, strained relations between China and the Soviet Union resulted in strained relations between China and the pro-Soviet Afghan communist regime. China and Afghanistan had neutral relations with each other during the rule of King Mohammed Zahir Shah. When the pro-Soviet Afghan communists seized power in Afghanistan in 1978, relations between China and the Afghan communists quickly turned hostile. The Afghan pro-Soviet communists supported the Vietnamese during the Sino-Vietnamese War and blamed China for supporting Afghan anti-communist militants. China responded to the Soviet invasion of Afghanistan by supporting the Afghan mujahideen and ramping up their military presence near Afghanistan in Xinjiang. China acquired military equipment from the United States to defend itself from Soviet attack.

China moved its training camps for the mujahideen from Pakistan into China itself. Hundreds of millions worth of anti-aircraft missiles, rocket launchers and machine guns were given to the mujahideen by the Chinese. Chinese military advisers and army troops were present with the mujahideen during training.

In 1980, China adopted a new Military Strategic Guideline that envisioned using a combined arms approach and positional warfare to defend against a potential invasion by the Soviet Union. Relations significantly improved in the early 1980s. In 1984, Deng Xiaoping stated that the People's Liberation Army no longer needed to anticipate an imminent invasion from the Soviet Union.

The deaths of Soviet leaders Leonid Brezhnev (in 1982), Yuri Andropov (1984), and Konstantin Chernenko (1985) provided the opportunity for Sino-Soviet "funeral diplomacy" and an improvement in relations. Chinese Foreign Minister Huang Hua met with Soviet Foreign Affairs Minister Andrei Gromyko at Brezhnev's funeral. Chinese Vice Premier and Politburo member Wan Li attended Andropov's funeral in a diplomatic move which signaled China's positive view of Andropov and optimism for better relations. Soviet-educated and Russian-speaking Vice Premier Li Peng attended Chernenko's funeral and met with Soviet leader Mikhail Gorbachev twice. Gorbachev affirmed to Li that the Soviet Union also wished to improve relations. At the Li–Gorbachev meetings, the two sides began again to refer to each other as "comrades" and Li congratulated the Soviet Union for its "socialist course". Despite the reconciliation, China made clear that it would continue to develop an independent foreign policy.

China's reform and opening up and the Soviet Union's perestroika raised similar challenges for both countries. Chinese leader Deng Xiaoping wanted to reduce tensions with the Soviet Union to facilitate focusing resources on economic development. Gorbachev likewise sought a more peaceful bilateral relationship in order to reduce military expenditures. Intrigued by reform and opening up, Gorbachev told a Chinese magazine, "We take special interest in China's ongoing economic and political reforms. Our two countries are now faced with similar problems. This will open a broad horizon for useful mutual exchange of experiences." The September 1989 withdrawal of Vietnam's forces from Cambodia further reduced Sino-Soviet tension. Gorbachev visited Beijing in May 1989 for the first summit between the two nations in thirty years.

== Relations between the Post-Soviet states and China ==
- Armenia
- Azerbaijan
- Belarus
- Estonia
- (Georgia (country)) Georgia
- Kazakhstan
- Kyrgyzstan
- Latvia
- Lithuania
- Moldova
- Russia
- Tajikistan
- Turkmenistan
- Ukraine
- Uzbekistan

== See also ==
- History of Sino-Russian relations
- History of foreign relations of the People's Republic of China
- Sino-Soviet Treaty of Friendship and Alliance
- China and Russia: Four Centuries of Conflict and Concord (book)
- Battle of Baitag Bogd
