= Making a fresh start =

Chinese Communist Party slogan

- Simplified Chinese: 另起炉灶
- Traditional Chinese: 另起爐灶
- Literal meaning: cook one's food in a new way
Transcriptions
Standard Mandarin
- Hanyu Pinyin: Lìngqǐ lúzào

Making a fresh start (simplified Chinese: 另起炉灶; traditional Chinese: 另起爐灶), or building a brand new stove, refers to abandoning the diplomatic relations, traditions and customs of the Republic of China (ROC), not recognizing the diplomatic relations established by the ROC government with other countries, treating all diplomatic envoys in the ROC as ordinary expatriates, and not recognizing their diplomatic status. Put forward by Mao Zedong, the principle means a total break with the "Old China".

Making a fresh start was one of the three principles of the People's Republic of China in its early years (the other two were to lean to one side and to clean the house before entertaining guests).
