= Shi Zhe =

Chinese military officer

Shi Zhe (Chinese: 師哲) (June 30, 1905 – August 17, 1998) was a Chinese Communist military officer, diplomat, translator and interpreter. Trained by the Soviet OGPU, he notably served as the main Russian language interpreter for Mao Zedong on many occasions, most prominently for Mao's meetings with Joseph Stalin during the Chinese leader's visit to the Soviet Union in 1949.

== Early life and years in the Soviet Union ==
Shi Zhe was born in 1905 to a peasant family in Hancheng, Shaanxi Province. In 1924 he joined the Chinese Socialist Youth League, while being student at the First Normal School (Teachers College) of Shaanxi in Xi'an. In 1925, he was selected by the Chinese Communist Party (CCP) to study in the Soviet Union, and entered the Kiev Joint Military Academy, specializing in military engineering. In October 1926, Shi Zhe was accepted as a full member of the CCP while in Kiev, and in 1927 he moved to Moscow, to study at the Moscow Military Engineering School. After graduating in 1928, he stayed at the school as an instructor for Chinese students.

In 1929, arranged by Zhou Enlai (during one of his visits to the Soviet Union), Shi Zhe entered the Soviet State Political Security Bureau (OGPU). He graduated from the Higher School of the OGPU, and served in the Soviet secret police for 9 years, until 1938. After the Chinese anti-Japanese general Ma Zhanshan went to the Soviet Union, he was declared a traitor. He was so frightened that he kneeled before Shi Zhe. Later, Shi Zhe served as the "guardian" of Ma Zhanshan under house arrest.

Shi Zhe was promoted to a Colonel of the OGPU, obtained the Soviet name "Karski" and the status of a reserve party member of the Communist Party of the Soviet Union, and experienced the Great Purge as a case handler. In 1938, the Soviet Union issued a policy prohibiting all foreigners from serving in the state security system. Therefore, in 1939, Shi Zhe was appointed as the political secretary of Ren Bishi, head of the CCP delegation to the Communist International. In March 1940, Ren and Shi together returned to China via Xinjiang.

== Second Sino–Japanese War and Chinese Civil War ==
On March 25, 1940, Shi Zhe arrived in Yan'an and met Mao Zedong for the first time. In the early days of returning to China, Shi Zhe was an observer of the Communist International, reporting on the upcoming 7th National Congress of the Chinese Communist Party. When the Communist International was dissolved in 1943, Shi Zhe's observer mission disappeared. However, Shi Zhe was still a very important liaison between China and the Soviet Union, responsible for (among other things) the telegram exchanges between Mao Zedong and Stalin and the translation tasks of Mao Zedong’s Soviet visitors.

In January 1943, Shi Zhe was appointed as the Director of the First Bureau of the Central Social Affairs Department (SAD). Under the leadership of Kang Sheng, he participated in the Yan'an Rectification Movement and was involved in the rescue of Xi Zhongxun, after he was falsely accused of being a spy.

Later, Shi Zhe participated in intelligence and sabotage operations against the Japanese and the Nationalist Government of Chiang Kai-shek. In March 1947, he was ordered to travel between northern Shaanxi and western Shanxi to translate telegrams between Chinese and Soviet leaders and to participate in the North China Land Reform Group. In March 1948, he accompanied Mao Zedong to Xibaipo and served as the Director of the Political Secretaries Office of the Secretariat of the Chinese Communist Party.

== 1949–1957: Years in power ==
On the eve of the founding of the People's Republic of China, the Central Committee sent a delegation led by Liu Shaoqi to visit the Soviet Union secretly, with Shi Zhe as an accompanying translator and assistant. After the founding of the People’s Republic of China, Shi Zhe served as the first Director of the Marxist-Leninist Research Bureau (which in 1953 later became the Compilation and Translation Bureau, with Shi remaining as Director) President of the Beijing Foreign Studies University, and President of the Foreign Languages Press.

He also served as the Russian translator for Mao Zedong, Zhou Enlai, Liu Shaoqi, Zhu De and other senior leaders of the CCP. He successively visited the Soviet Union and Eastern European countries with Mao Zedong, Zhou Enlai, Zhu De and others, and participated in the dialogue between the leaders of the various Communist countries. Most notably, he was the chief interpreter in the negotiation between Mao Zedong and Stalin for the signing of the Sino-Soviet Treaty of Friendship, Alliance and Mutual Assistance.

At the beginning of 1950, the CCP Central Committee decided to set up an editorial committee of the Selected Works of Mao Zedong, and Shi Zhe was responsible for translating the Chinese text into Russian. Shi Zhe completed the translation of the first to third volumes of Mao's selected works. In January 1951, a separate version of Mao's "On Practice" was also translated into Russian by Shi.

In 1954, Shi Zhe participated in the Geneva Conference as a member of the delegation of the People’s Republic of China, accompanying Zhou Enlai as a diplomatic aide. In the same year, Nikita Khrushchev led a Soviet delegation to participate in the celebration of the fifth anniversary of the National Day of the People's Republic of China and held talks with Chinese leaders. Shi Zhe served as the main interpreter, and then accompanied Khrushchev to visit South China. From December 1955 to March 1956, Shi Zhe accompanied Zhu De during his tour of Romania, East Germany, Hungary, Czechoslovakia and Poland, and then attended the 20th Congress of the Communist Party of the Soviet Union.

== Downfall and imprisonment ==
In 1957, Shi Zhe was transferred away from Beijing, becoming Secretary of the Secretariat of the Shandong Provincial Committee of the CCP. Because of an erotic scandal involving his young mistress, he was expelled from the CCP in 1958, and banished to work in a rural farm in his native Shaanxi, where he stayed until 1962.

Then things became even worse for Shi. In August 1962, Sino-Soviet relations had completely broken down. At this time, cadres associated with Xi Zhongxun were hunted down and purged throughout China. In September 1962, the Shaanxi Provincial Committee of the CCP sent personnel to escort Shi Zhe back to Beijing. After arriving in Beijing, Shi Zhe was detained and sent to Qincheng Prison. Shi Zhe had a blood vessel necrosis, and then underwent thoracic tumor resection surgery. In May 1975, Shi Zhe was released, after spending 13 years as a prisoner.

== Release, rehabilitation and later years ==
In the spring of 1979, the CCP Organization Department concluded that "Shi Zhe has been reviewed, and there are no political problems." At the suggestion of his old friend Wang Zhen, Shi Zhe was assigned to the Institute of Soviet and East European Studies of the Chinese Academy of Social Sciences (later changed to the Institute of Eastern Europe and Central Asia), as a special adviser. In 1986, he retired due to suffering from cerebral thrombosis. During his retirement years, he enjoyed the treatment and benefits of a deputy minister.

On August 17, 1998, Shi Zhe died in Beijing at the age of 93.
