= Sino-Soviet Treaty of Friendship, Alliance and Mutual Assistance =

1950–1979 military alliance treaty

Treaty of Friendship, Alliance and Mutual Assistance
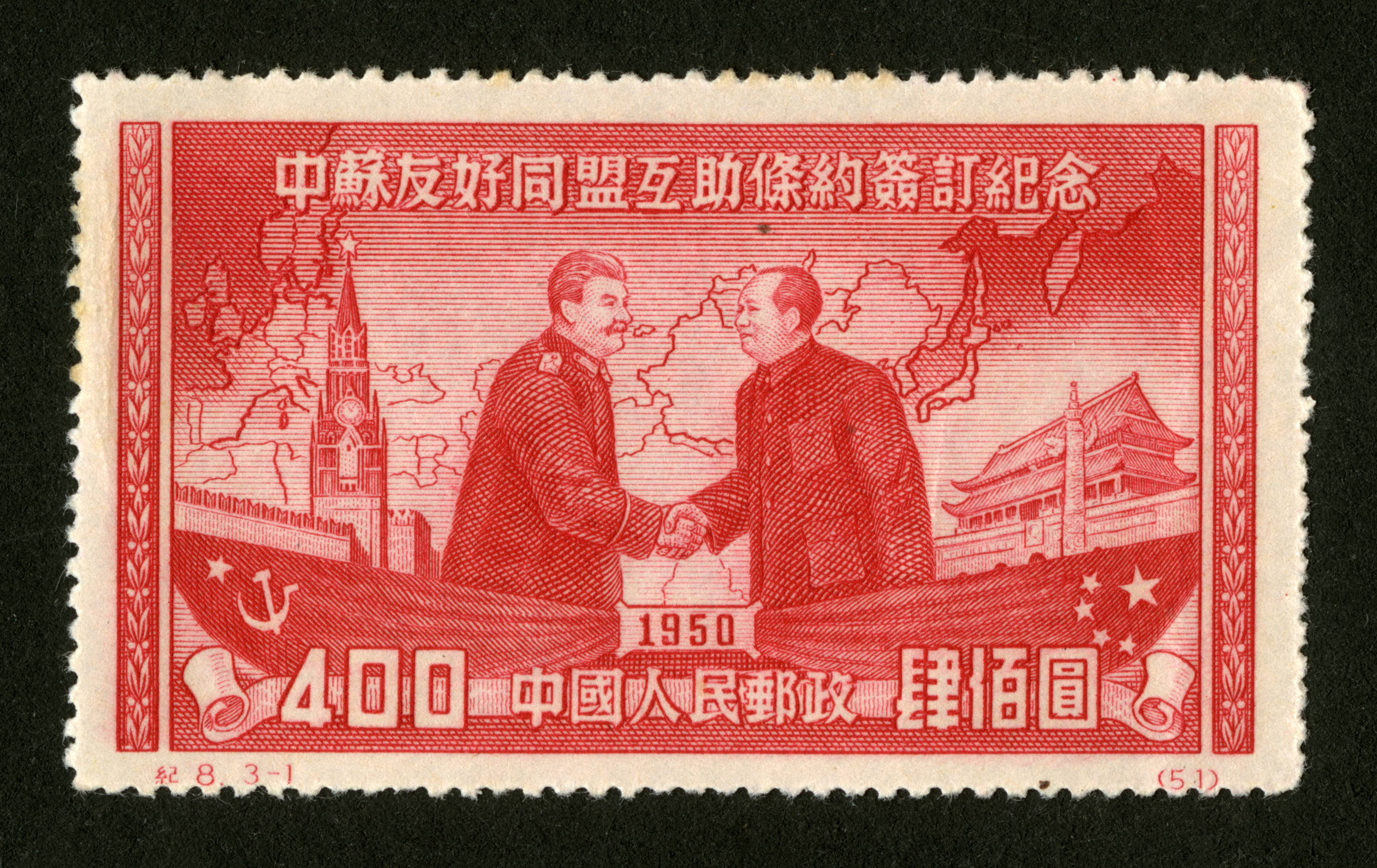
- A Chinese postage stamp commemorating the treaty's signature
- Signed: 14 February 1950
- Expiry: 16 February 1979
- Signatories: Joseph Stalin; Mao Zedong
- Parties: People's Republic of China; Soviet Union

The Sino-Soviet Treaty of Friendship, Alliance and Mutual Assistance (Russian: Советско-китайский договор о дружбе, союзе и взаимной помощи, simplified Chinese: 中苏友好同盟互助条约; traditional Chinese: 中蘇友好同盟互助條約; pinyin: Zhōng-Sū Yǒuhǎo Tóngméng Hùzhù Tiáoyuē), or Sino-Soviet Treaty of Friendship and Alliance for short, was a bilateral treaty of alliance, collective security, aid and cooperation concluded between the People's Republic of China and the Union of Soviet Socialist Republics on February 14, 1950. It superseded the previous Sino-Soviet treaty signed by the Kuomintang government. This treaty was signed against the background of the establishment of China's communist regime and the Cold War confrontation, resulting directly from Mao's foreign policy directive of "leaning to one side" (siding with the socialist camp) and Joseph Stalin's strategic and ideological considerations pertaining to the extension of Soviet influence in East Asia. Chairman of the Chinese Communist Party Mao Zedong travelled to the Soviet Union to sign the treaty, one of only two times in his life that he left China. The treaty laid the groundwork for Sino-Soviet cooperation and partnership. It provided China with security guarantees, and increased the scope for economic cooperation between the two countries. However, it did not prevent relations between Beijing and Moscow from drastically deteriorating in the late 1950s to the early 1960s, during the Sino-Soviet split.

After the expiration of the treaty in 1979, Deng Xiaoping wanted China not to negotiate with the Soviets unless they agreed to China's demands such as withdrawing from Afghanistan, removing their troops from Mongolia and the Sino-Soviet border, and ceasing their support of the Vietnamese invasion of Cambodia. The expiration of the treaty allowed China to attack Vietnam, a Soviet ally, in the Third Indochina War as a response to Vietnam's invasion of Cambodia since the treaty had prevented China from attacking Soviet allies.

== Background ==
=== Yalta Agreement ===
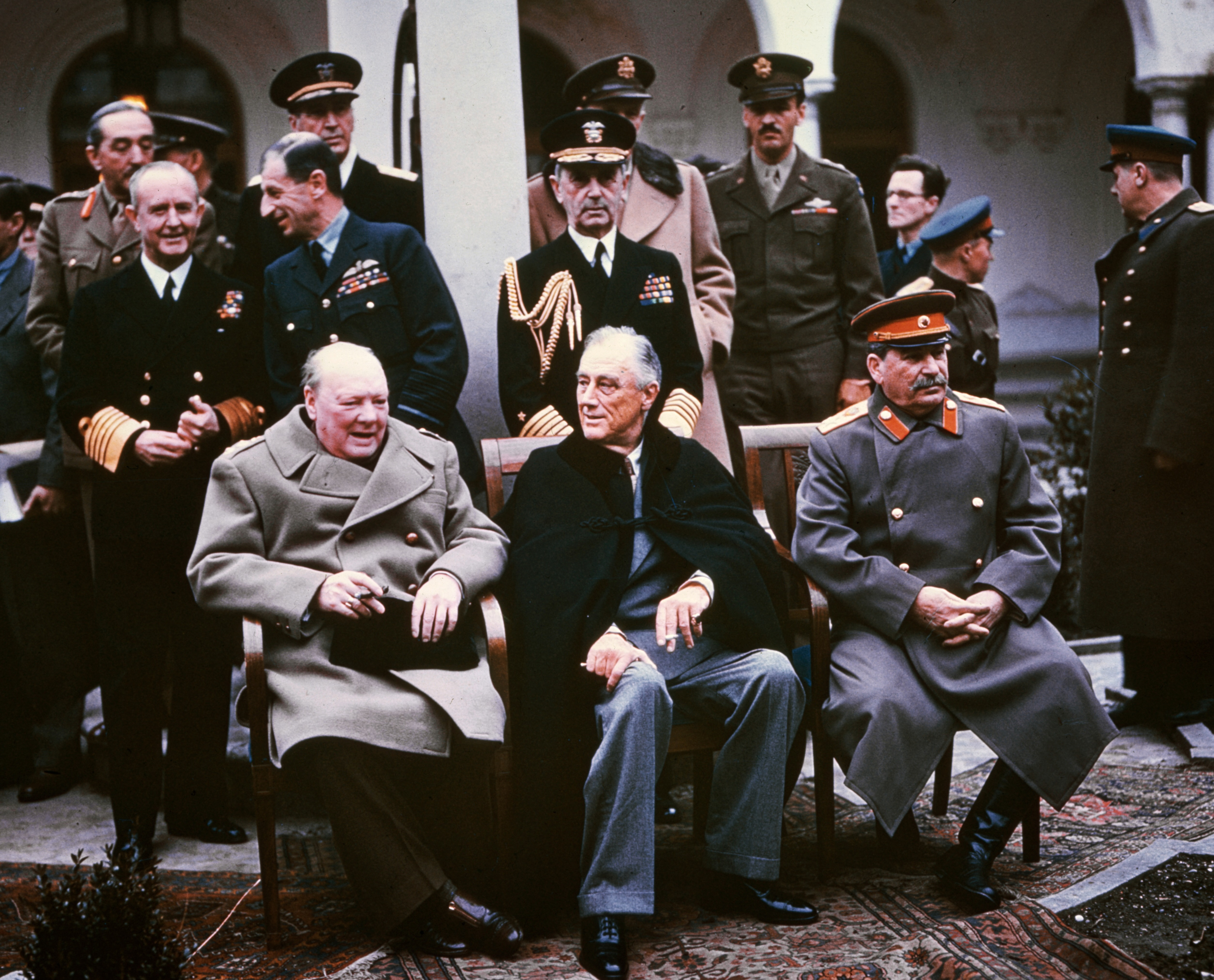
Churchill, Roosevelt, and Stalin at the Yalta Conference

At the end of World War II, Joseph Stalin identified two strategic objectives for the Soviet Union in the Far East after the war: the independence of Outer Mongolia from China and restoration of the sphere of influence of Tsarist Russia in Northeast China to ensure its geopolitical territorial security. To this end, Roosevelt, Stalin, and Churchill reached an agreement on February 11, 1945, at the Yalta Conference in which the Soviet Union recognized the Kuomintang (KMT) government as the legitimate government of China, regardless of the Chinese Communist Party (CCP). For the United States, it hoped that the Soviet Union would enter the war against Japan as soon as possible and support the KMT as the only legal government of China. In return, the United States would help the Soviet Union persuade the KMT to recognize the legal regime of the Soviet Union in Outer Mongolia. At that time, the relations between the Kuomintang and the CCP were very tense, and Chiang Kai-shek always tended to seek help from the United States and the Soviet Union in dealing with the conflict with the CCP. Thus, although no representative from either party came to the meeting at Yalta, Roosevelt still made it clear that every treaty that included China's problems needed Chiang's approval in the agreement because of his friendship with the KMT. After that, in order to force the Chinese Nationalist government to accept Soviet terms, the Soviet Red Army had entered northeast China in large numbers, and the KMT government led by Chiang was forced to agree on the Sino-Soviet Treaty of Friendship and Alliance.

=== Converging interests ===
Later, after the victory of the CCP in the Chinese Civil War, fundamentally changed the pattern of Asia and the Far East forcing the Soviet Union to reassess and adjust its policy towards China. The demands of China and the Soviet Union were common and mutual in some respects. To enhance the strength of the communist bloc against the US-led capitalist world in the international system of the Cold War, Stalin saw China under the leadership of CCP as a viable partner in checking US encroachment on the Soviet sphere of influence in East Asia. The CCP also needed the Soviet Union's support and assistance in its struggle to consolidate its rule and curb the attempts of the United States to overthrow the communist regime. Although the CCP won the final victory, many problems were left by the war. Therefore, China needed assistance from the Soviet Union in reconstruction, economic development and industrial production. Moreover, the ideological opposition and hostility between China and the US-led western camp ruled out the possibility of receiving aid from the west necessitating, the establishment of a stable and predictable diplomatic relationship with the Soviet Union.

=== Attitudes towards the implementation of the Treaty ===
However, the two parties' leaders had different views on the content and implementation of the treaty. Stalin hoped that the new treaty would remain under the framework of the Yalta agreement, which secured Soviet vested interests in Northeast China. On the other hand, Mao was preoccupied with setting up China's independent foreign image and abolishing all the unequal treaties imposed by imperial powers. After the founding of the People's Republic of China, the settlement of the alliance treaty between China and the Soviet Union has become an urgent matter for Chinese leaders to conduct diplomatic activities and make decisions. Therefore, Mao's first consideration on diplomatic issues was to have a direct talk with Stalin and sign a new Sino-Soviet treaty.

== Signing reasons ==
Having gone through the prolonged Second Sino-Japanese War and the civil war from 1945 to 1949, the newly established Communist regime inherited a devastated economy and volatile socio-political environment. The signing of the Sino-Soviet Treaty of Friendship, Alliance and Mutual Assistance materialized the cooperative relationship between the CCP of China and the Soviet Union. For China, the aim was to secure Soviet economic assistance for domestic development and replace the 1945 Sino-Soviet Treaty signed between the KMT government and the Soviet Union.

=== Domestic situation of the PRC ===
Despite the successful military campaigns ousting KMT presence in the mainland, years of prolonged warfare left the communist regime with the devastated industrial base, part of which resulted from the heavy bombardment of the industrial heartland by the KMT air force in the later phase of the civil war. For example, between October 1949 and February 1950, the KMT Air Force carried out 26 airstrikes against military and industrial targets in the communist-controlled regions, among which February 6, 1950, bombardment of Shanghai was most effective, inflicting heavy damage on the local industries and brought production to a halt because of the paralyzed electricity grid. The leaders of the CCP well understood the situation they faced, namely, lacking not only financial assistance, equipment, and industrial plants but also competent specialist capable of directing, managing, and restarting the national economy and industrial production. Anastas Mikoyan, a Soviet diplomat and the politburo member of the CPSU responsible for negotiation with Mao about the aid, reported that his Chinese comrades were politically sophisticated but had severely limited information about economic mechanisms and information.

=== Military concerns ===
The military occupation of Taiwan was given top priority during the later phase of the civil war and constituted the primary source of hostility between China and the US when communist victory seemed inevitable. However, a significant obstacle to seizing Taiwan was the lack or absence of functional air and naval force essential to any cross-strait military operation. Although Chiang Kai-shek had retreated to Taiwan by the time of the negotiation of the treaty, the KMT still maintained air and naval superiority over the PLA, which put the PLA in a disadvantageous position. A reflection of that was PLA's defeat in the Battle of Guningtou, where wooden boats of the CCP were met with well-equipped KMT armoured warships, and landing troops had to fight without air cover. The lack of air force capable of interception led to frequent and unimpeded KMT airstrikes against industrial targets following the seizures of large cities by the CCP, which elevated the importance of Soviet support in building a national air force and navy.

In the early stage of the negotiation, Zhu De proposed buying 100 aircraft, 100-200 helicopters 40-80 bombers, as well as training 1,000 Chinese pilots and 300 personnel at the Soviet Union. Mao also expressed his hope in Soviet air support for the planned attack on Taiwan but was rejected by Stalin for it would give the US an excuse to intervene.

=== Leaning to One Side ===
In his "On the People's Democratic Dictatorship" published on July 1, 1949, Mao articulated the "leaning to one side" foreign policy directive, in which he framed a world divided between the confrontational Socialist and imperialist camps and that "sitting on the fence will not do, nor is there a third road." Thus, faced with the bleak situation and threats from both within and without, consolidating the communist rule under the Cold War framework of the mid-20th century Mao saw the necessity and benefits in firmly siding with the Soviet Union and joining the socialist camp. He perceived the cooperation within the socialist camp as goodwill and sincere assistance in countries' development in contrast to the Marshall Plan, which Mao considered a pretense of exploitation and the US agenda to exert political influence into the recipient countries. For China, materializing rapid industrialization through economic assistance was one of the primary goals, which rendered the need for Soviet economic and technological assistance the driving force behind the 1950 treaty.

=== Ideology ===
When faced with the choice between the American-led Western Bloc and the Soviet-led Eastern Bloc, Mao chose to side with the Soviet Union because of ideological proximity. In contrast to the Marshall Plan bearing "imperialist" and "interventionist" connotations, Soviet aid was framed as international support from the world proletariat revolutionary forces. The fraternal relationship between China and the Soviet Union embodied a socialist internationalism and coherent ideological framework which gave impetus to the signing of the treaty, and according to Stalin, China's enrollment "formed a strong, united socialist camp to confront the capitalist camp" and constituted a socialist international cooperation framework more genuine than the capitalist one.

== Negotiation process ==
=== Prelude to negotiations ===
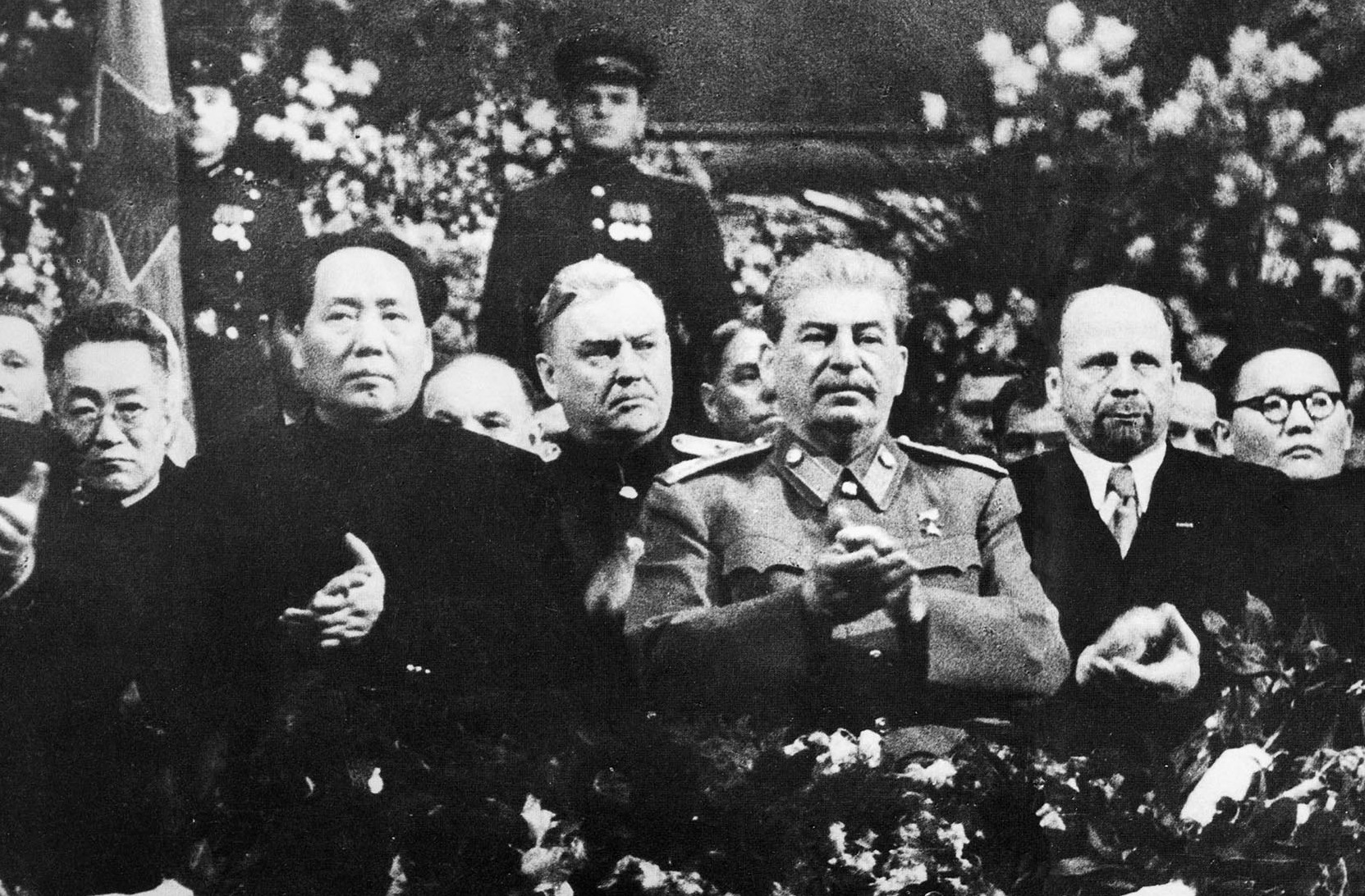
Mao and Stalin in Moscow, December, 1949

On December 6, Mao travelled by train to Moscow, along with Chen Boda, Mao's chief secretary for political and ideological affairs, Ye Siluo, Mao's private secretary for secret affairs; Wang Dongxing, who was responsible for Mao's security and Shi Zhe, Mao's interpreter. The first official interaction between Mao and Stalin took place in the Kremlin on the night of the 16th. Mao first claimed that the most important concern for China was securing peace. China needed three to five years of peace to restore the economy to pre-war standards and stabilize the country. The resolution of China's major issues depended heavily on the prospects for peace. Mao's concern resonated well with Stalin, who responded that there was no direct threat to China from foreign powers since Japan and Germany were still recovering. Most Western countries, including the United States, were reluctant to wage another war. Stalin also claimed that if the two countries work together and maintain friendly relationships, they can guarantee peace for 20 to 25 years, or even longer. Hence, this view is consistent with the standpoint of the CCP Central Committee at that time.

=== Diverging views ===
Immediately following, Mao addressed his concerns towards the Treaty of Friendship and Alliance signed between the Chinese Nationalist government and the Soviet Union in August 1945, which Liu Shaoqi also raised in July 1949 prior to Mao's arrival. Therefore, the CCP attached great importance to this issue, and the conclusion of a new treaty with the Soviet Union was one of the main goals for Mao. On the other hand, Stalin preferred the existing treaty with the KMT to remain in force. Stalin argued that the agreement in the treaty was regulated by the Yalta agreement, such as the administration of the Kuril Islands, Southern Sakhalin, and Port Arthur. In other words, the conclusion of the treaty was approved by the United States and Britain, so changes in any points of the treaty would give the United States and Britain leverage to alter the points regarding the Kuril Islands or Southern Sakhalin, which were the Soviet Union's territorial gains made in Yalta. Regarding Mao's desire for a new treaty, Stalin addressed the possibility of formally retaining the existing treaty while changing it in practice. For instance, the Soviet Union still reserved the rights to station troops in Port Arthur, yet at the same time, withdrew the units in Port Arthur as the CCP had suggested. Mao responded euphemistically that it is necessary to consider the legality of the Yalta Conference; however, within Chinese society, the public believed that since the KMT was already defeated, the existing Treaty of Friendship and Alliance lost its purpose and significance. Stalin, in turn, claimed that the existing treaty would be altered eventually.

=== Turning point ===
Similar to the request for a new treaty, Mao also received other refusals from Stalin. One of them was the military aid to support the PLA for launching an attack on Taiwan. Stalin argued that military aid from the Soviet Union would give the United States an excuse to intervene. After the celebration of Stalin's 70th birthday, Mao further reinforced his position on concluding a new treaty, yet what he received were more refusals from Stalin. According to Mao himself, Mao tried to reach Stalin several times, but the Kremlin told Mao that Stalin was not at home and tried to arrange Mao with Stalin's associates instead. Mao decided to keep waiting. With rumours of Mao being held by Stalin secretly spreading, the two parties finally agreed to act in accordance to address the rumours. They decided to invite Mao for an interview with Soviet press TASS. The interview also marked a turning point in the discussion of the treaty with Mao.

=== Agreement reached ===
On January 2, 1950, Stalin finally agreed to initiate the talk with Mao to address the treaty issue. Mao presented three proposals: the conclusion of a new treaty, a publication of official announcements from the two countries claiming that the two parties have reached an agreement on issues regarding the previous treaty, and finally, a signing of the declaration of relationships between the two countries without the need of a new treaty. Mao certainly favoured the first proposal, which he argued would bring great benefits to both countries politically, particularly for confrontation with other imperialist powers. After the approval from the Soviet side, the two parties arranged Zhou Enlai's arrival in Moscow.

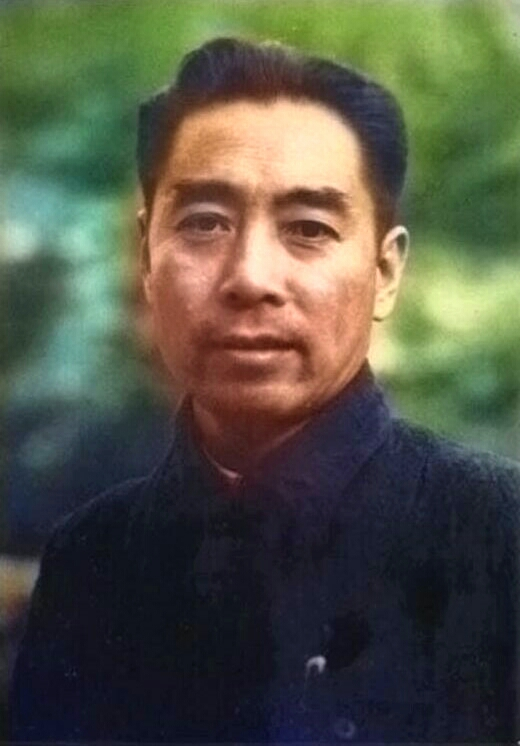
Prime Minister Zhou Enlai in the 1940s

Prime Minister Zhou Enlai arrived in Moscow with the Chinese negotiation delegation on January 20, 1950. After a series of preparations, the negotiation finally took place on the evening of January 22. The participants from the Soviet side were Stalin, Molotov, Malenkov, Mikoyan, Vyshinsky, and Fedorenko; Chinese participants included Mao Zedong, Zhou Enlai, Li Fuchun, Wang Jiaxiang, Chen Boda, and Shi Zhe. The negotiation reached an agreement between both parties that the Treaty of Friendship and Alliance of August 14, 1945 needed to be replaced by a new treaty. The two sides also reached an agreement on the issues of Port Arthur, and Stalin agreed to withdraw troops from Port Arthur. However, the two parties did not settle on a complete agreement about the Chinese Changchun Railway (CCR). Although Stalin agreed to shorten the length of the CCR agreement of 1945, Stalin turned down China's request to pass the management of the railroad to China and increase the share of Chinese capital.

The treaty draft was first delivered from the Soviet side to the Chinese side on January 23, 1950. Immediately, Zhou Enlai responded with a Chinese draft in the evening. The Sino-Soviet Treaty of Friendship, Alliance, and Mutual Assistance of 1950 included the following terms: Prevention of Aggression, International Action for Peace and Security, Clause of Assistance, Prohibition of Alliances, Renunciation of Separate Negotiations with Japan, Clause of Consultation, and Economic and Cultural Cooperation and Mutual Assistance. Both parties agreed that the treaty's duration should remain for thirty years. The treaty, the agreements, and the notes were signed on February 14, 1950, in the Kremlin formally.

== Terms of the treaty ==
=== General agreement ===
Article 1.

Promise of collective security that treats an attack on one as an attack on both to prevent the revival of Japanese imperialism. The two sides were obliged to extend military and other forms of assistance when faced with aggression and war. The two contracting parties undertook to uphold principles of cooperation conducive to international peace and security.

Article 2.

The signatories should conclude a peace treaty with Japan in conjunction with other allied powers of WWII.

Article 3.

The signatories should not participate in coalition and alliance directed against the other.

Article 4.

Mutual consultation on major issues concerning the essential interest of the signing parties.

Article 5.

The two parties agreed to adhere to the principles of "equal rights, mutual interests, respect for sovereignty and territorial integrity, and non-intervention," facilitation of close cooperation, rendering economic and industrial assistance and would strive for strengthening friendship between China and the USSR.

Article 6.

The treaty would be in effect for thirty years, and if no party voices objection to the treaty one year before expiration, the treaty should automatically be extended for another five years.

=== Changchun Railway, Port Arthur, and Dalian ===
Both sides agreed on a complete transfer of all the rights and associated properties of the Changchun Railway back to China free of charge until the conclusion of a peace treaty with Japan but no later than 1952.

The Soviet Union would withdraw its troops from the jointly-used naval base at Port Arthur upon concluding a peace treaty with Japan, and the Chinese government would be responsible for the cost of construction and installation incurred by the Soviet Union since 1945. The Joint Sino-Soviet Military Commission with a post-rotation mechanism was to be established overseeing the military affairs until the transfer of ownership.

The ownership of Port Dalian would be handed back to China along with the associated properties temporarily administered by the Soviet Union under a joint commission composed of representatives from both parties.

=== Soviet loan to China ===
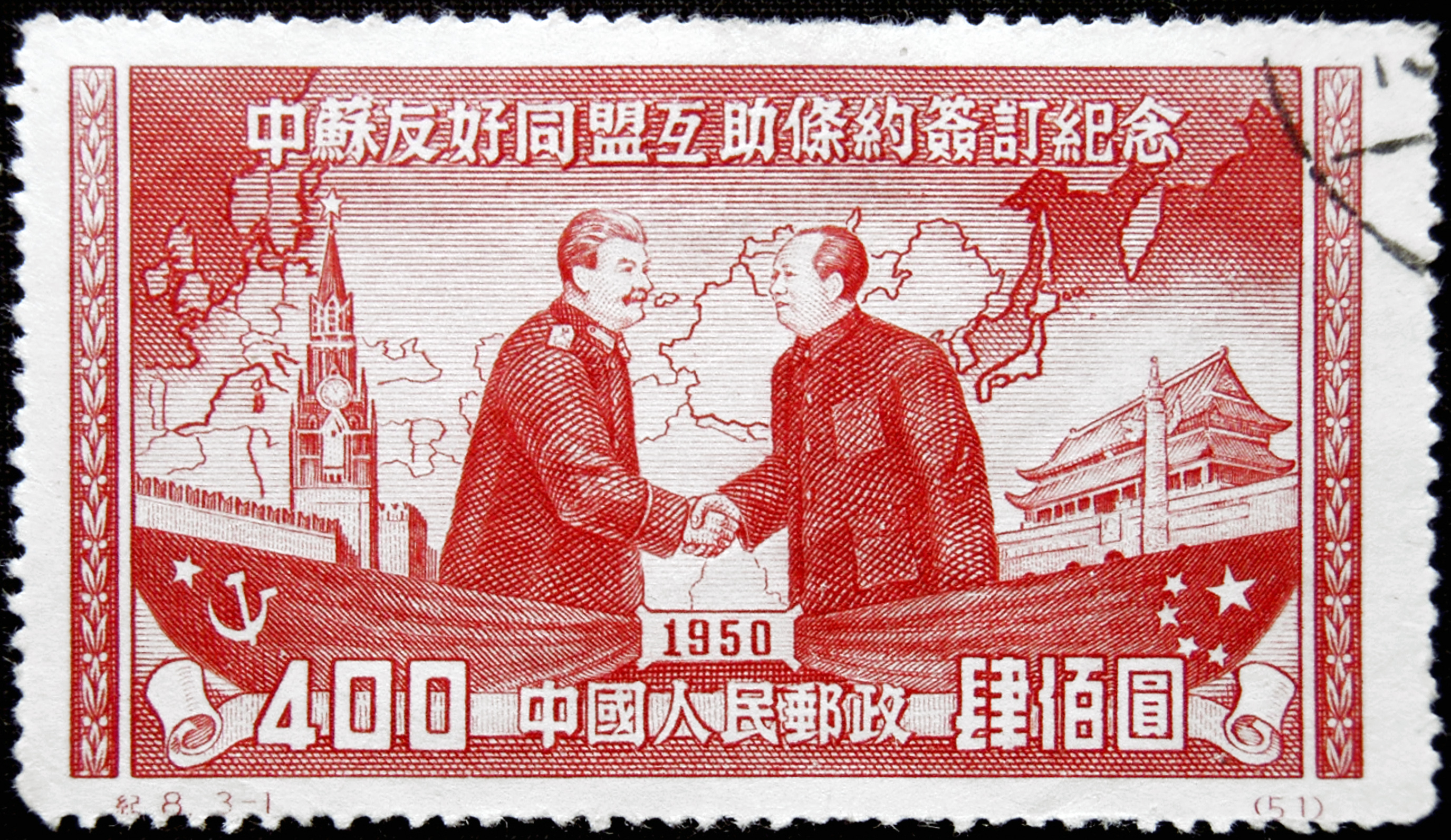
Commemorative stamps honoring the signing of the Sino-Soviet Friendship Treaty in 1950

A loan of $60 million a year and $300 million in total at the interest rate of 1 percent per year was granted to China starting from January 1950, in the form of railways, industrial infrastructure, equipment, and materials for reconstruction and recovery from the destruction of war.

=== Soviet specialists ===
Soviet specialists were sent to work in Chinese institutions, industries, organizations to assist and advise China's reconstruction, industrialization, and economic development with the fixed duration of work at one year, whose treatments were identical to Chinese technicians. The Chinese side is responsible for travel costs, expenditure, lodging, and wages of the Soviet experts, while the cost incurred by the abrupt recall of experts by the Soviet side falls on the Soviet Union.

=== Controversies around national interest ===
China covering a vast territory with rich natural resources endowments was strategically crucial for the Soviet Union. Therefore, the Soviet Union made a huge concession renouncing its vested interest in Northeast China as embodied in the return of the Chinese Changchun Railway, Port Arthur, and Dalian in order to reinforce the solidarity of the socialist camp in confrontation with the capitalist bloc and the defence of the Far East. The Sino-Soviet strategic partnership was a dilemma for Stalin. On the one hand, assisting and having a trusted socialist ally like China in East Asia would immensely tip the balance of power to the Soviet Union's favour and reinforce Soviet leadership in the communist world. On the other hand, Stalin feared that Mao would become a second Tito defying Soviet will after the recovery from the war. Although the $300 million was materialized in the end, the agreement came with much more stringent conditions than those signed between the Soviet Union and Eastern European socialist countries. For example, the Soviet treaty concluded with Eastern European countries spoke in terms of "immediately giving all available military and other assistance". However, Stalin revised the aid agreement to "provide all possible economic assistance" and imposed more stringent conditions on the treatments of Soviet experts. Also, technological assistance regarding nuclear weapons was held off until the Khrushchev era. According to Mao, it was only after the Korean War that China won the trust of the Soviet Union, followed by more aid, cooperation and the 156 Projects.

On the Chinese side, Soviet aid constituted the most important and viable means for reconstruction and recovery. China thus faced a trade-off between aid and revision of the independence of Outer Mongolia acknowledged in the Sino-Soviet treaty signed by the KMT government. There was also uneasiness around creating Sino-Soviet joint ventures, which Mao believed embodied certain degrees of Soviet paternalism and distrust. Also, the Soviet loan was not for free. Stalin demanded the entirety of Chinese surplus production of strategically important resources to be sold to the Soviet Union as repayment. Between 1954 and 1959, China supplied 160,000 tons of tungsten ore, 110,000 tons of copper, 30,000 tons of antimony, and 90,000 tons of rubber to the Soviet Union. Nevertheless, given the stake of this treaty for both sides, none of these impeded the final agreement.

== Effects and legacy ==
=== China ===
Soviet aid to China, as stipulated in the treaty, played a pivotal role in shaping the Chinese economic system securing the survival of the newly established communist regime and contributed to the recovery from the devastation of prolonged wars, industrialization, and modernization of communist China. Namely, the Soviet aid, both technical expertise and assistance in material forms such as equipment, funds, and infrastructure construction, helped lay the groundwork for China's planned economy, state-owned enterprises, and different industries. The massive influx of Soviet aid within a short period replaced the function of capital accumulation essential to the development of economies and significantly reduced the time needed to acquire knowledge and technical skills, which often take practice and study of generations of workers to obtain. Also, joining the Soviet-led socialist camp won China its much-needed international support, which offset the effects of economic blockade, embargo of 400 kinds of goods imposed by the capitalist bloc and military threats.

The comprehensive aid also altered the industrial landscape of the newly established country. Prior to the treaty's signing, around 70% of China's industries were concentrated in the coastal area of the southeast, where trade was conducted in the 19th century between western powers and the Qing government. By contrast, projects aided by the Soviet Union were primarily located in the northeast, centre, and the western region of China, which optimized the spatial distribution of China's industries, promoting economies of the previously underdeveloped hinterland and facilitated Chinese industrialization and modernization in general.

The Treaty influenced the Chinese foreign policy principle of non-interventionism, which subsequently became a central principle of Chinese foreign policy after its inclusion in the Five Principles of Peaceful Coexistence.

=== Downside of the imported Soviet model ===
What came along with the Soviet aid was a rigid and overly centralized power structure and planned economy. From the ideological perspective, any attempt to acknowledge the positive role of market mechanism was seen as taking the capitalist road. There was also an institutional mismatch between the impressive capability of resources mobilization, massive industrial plant construction, and poor mechanisms of managing and coordinating production. The distinctive drawback inherent to the Stalinist model also manifested itself in China's planned economy. During the first five-year plan, the rapid industrialization disproportionately prioritized the defence and heavy industry, while the importance of civil and light industry was downplayed and rendered accessories.

=== Sino-Soviet relations and the international system ===
On the one hand, the signing of the Sino-Soviet Treaty of Friendship, Alliance and Mutual Assistance contributed to a fraternal relationship between the two sides and redressed the post-WWII balance of power between the capitalist and socialist camps. The perception of Russians as benevolent "elder brothers" guiding China on the road to modernity enjoined great popularity in Chinese society and political discourse. The treaty provisions also bolstered solidarity within the communist bloc led by the Soviet Union, strengthening it in its confrontation with the capitalist bloc and significantly contributing to China's consolidation of power and ruling legitimacy. Soviet aid to socialist countries and treaty signed with China, coinciding with American aid through the Marshall Plan and Truman's Point Four Program manifested the great power competition for spheres of influence under the cold war framework and mentality through which the Soviet Union managed to secure China's newly emerged communist regime safeguarding its interest in the Far East.

On the other hand, in the diplomatic exchanges between the two sides, Chinese leaders often appealed to the merit of Sinicization of Marxism, including "peasant encirclement of the cities", "land revolution", and "secret and open struggle within cities", which were adaptations based on Chinese context and significantly diverged from the orthodox Soviet interpretation of Marxism-Leninism. These sowed the seeds for the Sino-Soviet split in the late 50s and early 60s. Austin Jersild, in his The Sino-Soviet Alliance: An International History, offers a similar perspective that the potentially paternalistic Soviet advising program and years of interaction generated unintended resentment of Soviet involvement, which resembled and reminded the Chinese people of imperialism.

== See also ==
- Sino-Soviet relations
  - Sino-Soviet Non-Aggression Pact (1937)
  - Sino-Soviet Treaty of Friendship and Alliance (1945)
  - Sino-Soviet split (1956–1966)
  - Sino-Soviet border conflict (1969)
- 2001 Sino-Russian Treaty of Friendship

== Bibliography ==
- Ballis, William B. "The Pattern of Sino-Soviet Treaties, 1945–1950". The ANNALS of the American Academy of Political and Social Science 277, no. 1 (September 1951): 167–76. https://doi.org/10.1177/000271625127700117.
- Cheng, Joseph Y. S. "Challenges to China's Russian Policy in Early 21st Century". Journal of Contemporary Asia 34, no. 4 (2004): 480–502.
- Elleman, Bruce A. 2020. "14 February 1950—Sino-Soviet Friendship Treaty". In International Rivalry and Secret Diplomacy in East Asia, 1896–1950. 1st ed., 242–252: Routledge.
- Elleman, Bruce A., Stephen Kotkin, and Taylor & Francis eBooks A–Z. Manchurian Railways and the Opening of China: An International History. Armonk, N.Y: M.E. Sharpe, 2010;2009;2015;. doi:10.4324/9781315702643
- Foot, Rosemary. "New Light on the Sino-Soviet Alliance: Chinese and American Perspectives". Journal of Northeast Asian Studies 10, no. 3 (1991): 16.
- Heinzig, Dieter. The Soviet Union and Communist China 1945–1950: The Arduous Road to the Alliance. 1st ed. Armonk, N.Y: M.E. Sharpe, 2004;1998;2003;.https://doi.org/10.4324/9781315698984
- Knight, John M. "Mandated Internationalism: Sino-Soviet Friendship 1949–1956". Twentieth Century Communism 19, no. 19 (2020): 26–60.https://web.s.ebscohost.com/ehost/pdfviewer/pdfviewer?vid=0&sid=e494e396-a147-4bcc-825d-52f5fc43f90e%40redis
- Lawrance, Alan. "PART I the Era of Sino-Soviet Friendship 1945–55". In China's Foreign Relations since 1949, 39–87: Routledge.
- Lee, Wonhee. "Review - the Sino-Soviet Alliance: An International History." E-IR, July 11, 2015.https://www.e-ir.info/2015/06/27/review-the-sino-soviet-alliance-an-international-history/
- Zhou, Hong. 2014. "Soviet Aid to China". In Foreign Aid in China, 57–106. Berlin, Heidelberg: Springer Berlin Heidelberg.
