= 1989 Sino-Soviet Summit =

Diplomatic meeting between China and the Soviet Union

The four-day Sino-Soviet Summit was held in Beijing from 15 to 18 May 1989. This would be the first formal meeting between a Soviet Communist leader and a Chinese Communist leader since the Sino-Soviet split in the 1950s. The last Soviet leader to visit China was Nikita Khrushchev in September 1959. Both Deng Xiaoping, the paramount leader of China, and Mikhail Gorbachev, General Secretary of the Communist Party of the Soviet Union, proclaimed that the summit was the beginning of normalized state-to-state relations. The meeting between Mikhail Gorbachev and then General Secretary of the Chinese Communist Party (CCP), Zhao Ziyang, was hailed as the "natural restoration" of party-to-party relations.

== Improvements in bilateral relations (1986–1989) ==
The first breakthrough in Sino-Soviet relations was in July 1986. In a speech in the city of Vladivostok, Gorbachev announced a series of unilateral concessions to the Chinese. The Soviet Union pledged to withdraw troops from Mongolia, East Russia and from Afghanistan, and would also accept the Chinese position regarding the border issue – "recognizing that the border between the two countries should run along the line of the Chinese bank of the two border rivers – Amur and Ussuri".

Furthermore, in 1986, the Chinese opened a consulate in Leningrad while the Soviets opened a consulate in Shanghai. China also held its first large scale industrial and trade exhibition in thirty three years in Moscow and the Soviet Union reciprocated and held its own industrial and trade exhibition in Beijing. In May of the same year, the two countries also agreed to a two-year cultural accord to expand cooperation in science, culture, education, journalism, broadcasting, sports, television, art, and film. In a closed session of foreign ministers at the Warsaw meeting of the Political Consultative Body of the Warsaw Treaty in July 1988, the Soviet Union admitted that it could no longer afford to keep the arms race with the United States going. The Soviet Union recognized that peace was now its highest priority regardless of social and political ideologies. The Soviet Union also wanted to constrain US-China cooperation and influence in the region.

During Eduard Shevardnadze's (former Foreign Minister of the Soviet Union from 1985 to 1991) visit to Beijing in February 1989, both nations agreed on a date and timetable for Gorbachev's visit. Gorbachev was finally officially invited by the President of China, Yang Shangkun.

== Summit meeting (15–18 May 1989) ==
Due to the 1989 Tiananmen Square protests, the original plans of receiving the Soviet delegation with a grand ceremony at Tiananmen Square had to be scratched. Instead, the Soviet delegation only received a small welcoming ceremony at the airport. Some students who were occupying the square were holding banners and hailing Gorbachev as "The Ambassador of Democracy" as a result of the political reforms Gorbachev has instituted back in the Soviet Union. On May 16, 1989, Mikhail Gorbachev finally met with the Chinese paramount leader, Deng Xiaoping, at the Great Hall of the People. Gorbachev also met with General Secretary Zhao Ziyang and the Premier of China, Li Peng. Gorbachev's meeting with Deng was supposed to represent the normalization of state-to-state relations while his meeting with General Secretary Zhao Ziyang was supposed to represent the restoration of party-to-party relations. Chinese politicians emphasized that the restoration of party relations did not mean returning to the dominance of the Soviet Union. They stressed that the relationship would be of equality, independence, and sovereignty. Deng also viewed the summit as his last chance to assert his will over Sino-Soviet relations. The two sides agreed that the two nations would share information and experiences, but will not harmonize policies.

One of the central issues that was discussed was the disagreement over the Cambodian issue. China viewed Cambodia as a Vietnamese puppet state and called for Vietnamese troop withdrawal from the area. The Chinese supported the idea of a quadrilateral coalition government headed by Prince Sihanouk. They wanted written Soviet commitment to a comprehensive settlement. The Soviets, on the other hand, considered Cambodian national reconciliation a domestic issue and it should be handled as such. Gorbachev discussed future economic developments, such as cooperation in metallurgy and energy and transportation, with Premier Li Peng.

One area where progress was made during the summit was the reduction in military tensions. Both sides agreed to reduce the military numbers along the borders to a minimum. On May 17, Gorbachev announced a plan to set up a "working negotiating mechanism" for troop reductions along the border.

During Gorbachev's meeting with Zhao, Zhao emphasized the fact that Deng's retirement from the 13th party congress had only been formal and that he remained the paramount leader in China. Soviet assessment of this statement was that Zhao was putting the blame on Deng for the student protests that had disrupted some of the social events planned for the Soviet delegation.

=== Summit atmosphere ===
People's Daily called Gorbachev's meeting with Deng on May 17 "friendly and frank" while Pravda added "constructive". People's Daily called the meeting with Li Peng "frank and friendly" while Pravda described it as "warm and friendly". People's Daily reported that the Gorbachev's meeting with Zhao Ziyang was "friendly" but this was not reflected in Pravda. Soviet news agency, TASS, had reported on May 16 that the meeting with Zhao was "warm and friendly", but Pravda omitted this the next day.

== Gorbachev's view of the Tiananmen Square protests ==
The timing of Gorbachev's visit was far from ideal by virtue of the massive student protests in the Chinese capital. Nonetheless, neither side proposed to postpone or reschedule the meeting.

Gorbachev refused to pass judgement on the student protests in hopes that the Chinese leaders and the student protesters would resolve their differences by themselves. Even though the demonstrations disrupted the reception of the Soviet delegation and many of the social events of the visit were cancelled, Gorbachev was still very pleased with the reception in Beijing as well as the summit as a whole as he was able to accomplish his goal of normalizing relations. According to political scientist, William Taubman, even though Gorbachev did not say it directly during the Summit or afterward, he sympathized with the protestors as they were pushing for the political changes that Gorbachev had implemented in the Soviet Union.
