= Cleaning the house before inviting guests =

Chinese Communist Party slogan

Cleaning the house before inviting guests (Chinese: 打扫干净屋子再请客) was one of the three major foreign policy policies of the People's Republic of China in the early days of its founding, with the other two being Leaning to One Side and Making a fresh start. It was proposed by Mao Zedong at the second plenary session of the 7th Central Committee of the Chinese Communist Party in March 1949 after the victory of the three major campaigns. It meant that China would seek to "clean up" colonial influences before it sought recognition from states that it deemed as Western imperialists.

== Definition ==
Cleaning the house before inviting guests meant that China would first eliminate the remaining forces and privileges of imperialism in China and all unequal treaties before considering the issue of establishing diplomatic relations with Western countries.

== See also ==
- Making a fresh start
