= Leaning to One Side =

Chinese foreign policy

Leaning to One Side (simplified Chinese: 一边倒; traditional Chinese: 一邊倒) was a diplomatic relations policy of the People's Republic of China in its early years. The policy was more than just founding an alliance with the Soviet Union, but meant resolutely supporting the Communist bloc and opposing the imperialist and capitalist camp led by the United States of America.

== See also ==
- Making a fresh start
- Cleaning the house before inviting guests

== Bibliography ==
- Heinzig, Dieter (2004). The Soviet Union and Communist China, 1945-1950: The Arduous Road to the Alliance. Armonk: M.E. Sharpe.
- Shen, Zhihua; Li, Danhui (2011). After Leaning to One Side: China and Its Allies in the Cold War. Stanford: Stanford University Press.
- Shen, Zhihua; Xia, Yafeng (2015). Mao and the Sino-Soviet Partnership, 1945-1959: A New History. Lanham: Lexington Books.
- Yu, Priscilla C. (2001). "Leaning to One Side: The Impact of the Cold War on Chinese Library Collections". Libraries & Culture. 36 (1): 253–266. doi:10.1353/lac.2001.0019. JSTOR 25548906. S2CID 142658671.
