= Ministry of Commerce (China) =

Chinese government ministry

Ministry of Commerce of the People's Republic of China
- 中华人民共和国商务部; Zhōnghuá Rénmín Gònghéguó Shāngwùbù
- Logo of the Ministry of Commerce

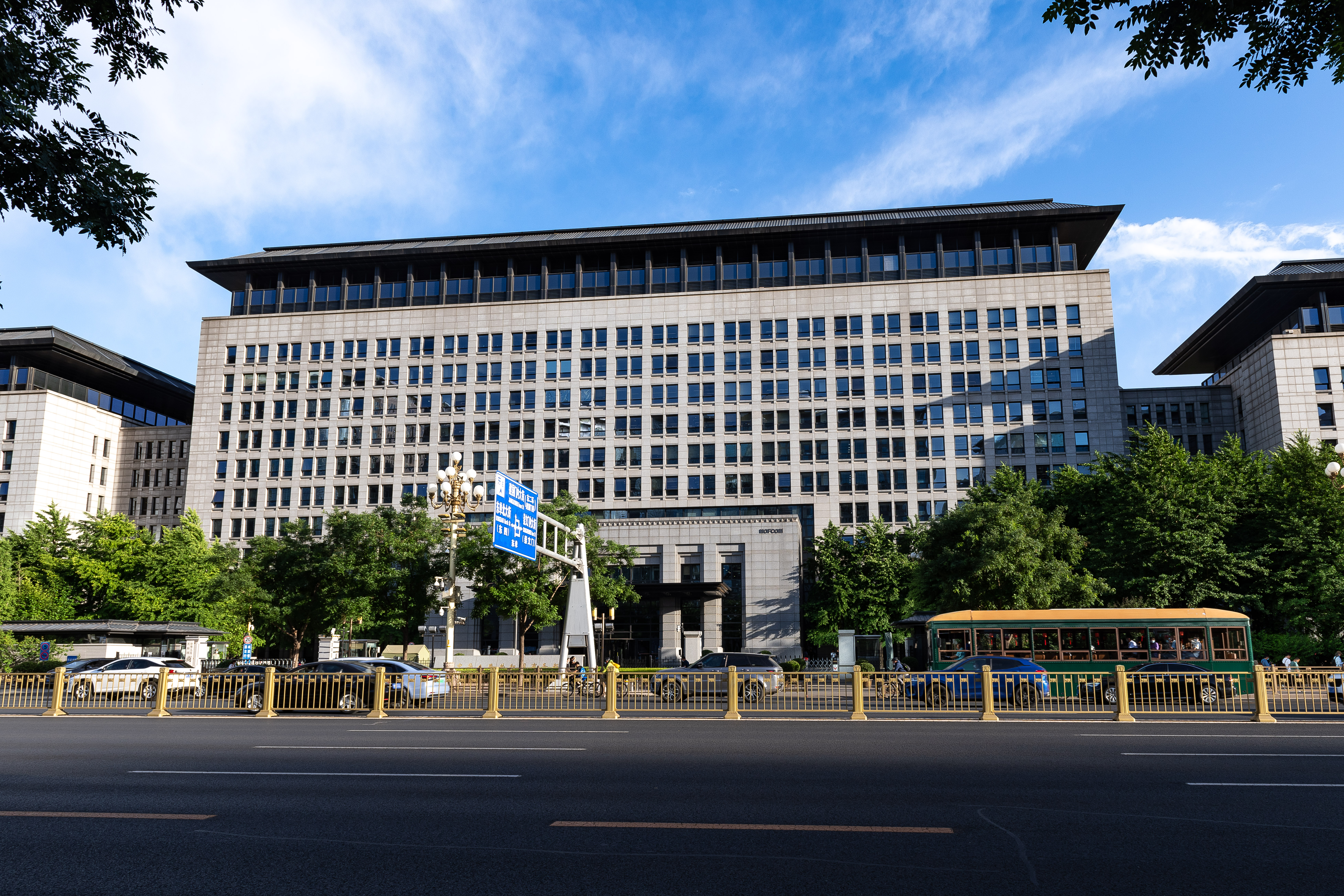
- Headquarters

Agency overview
- Formed: March 2003; 23 years ago
- Preceding agency: Ministry of Foreign Trade and Economic Co-operation
- Type: Constituent Department of the State Council (cabinet-level)
- Jurisdiction: Government of China
- Headquarters: Beijing
- Minister responsible: Wang Wentao, Minister
- Deputy Ministers responsible: Wang Shouwen; Ling Ji, International Trade Deputy Negotiator; Sheng Qiuping; Guo Tingting; Li Fei
- Agency executives: Tu Gengxin, Leader of Discipline Inspection & Supervision Team; Wang Wen, International Trade Negotiator
- Parent agency: State Council
- Website: www.mofcom.gov.cn

Ministry of Commerce
- Simplified Chinese: 中华人民共和国商务部
- Traditional Chinese: 中華人民共和國商務部
Transcriptions
Standard Mandarin
- Hanyu Pinyin: Zhōnghuá Rénmín Gònghéguó Shāngwùbù

The Ministry of Commerce (MOFCOM) is an executive department of the State Council of the People's Republic of China responsible for formulating policies on foreign trade, export and import regulations, foreign direct investments, consumer protection, market competition (competition regulator), and negotiating bilateral and multilateral trade agreements. It is the 20th-ranked department of the State Council. The current minister is Wang Wentao.

== History ==
In November 1949, a month after the People's Republic of China was established, the Chinese Communist Party formed the Ministry of Trade (貿易部) while the Republic of China's Ministry of Economic Affairs (MOEA, 經濟部) continued to operate in Taipei, serving Taiwan and several other islands.

In August 1952, the Ministry was renamed to Ministry of Foreign Trade (对外贸易部). Ye Jizhuang was the first Minister and died in the post in 1967.

In March 1982, the Ministry of Foreign Trade was merged with the Ministry of Foreign Economic Liaison (对外经济联络部), the State Import and Export Regulation Commission (国家进出口管理委员会), and the State Foreign Investment Regulation Commission (国家外国投资管理委员会), and became the Ministry of Foreign Economic Relations and Trade (对外经济贸易部).

In March 1993, the Ministry of Foreign Economic Relations and Trade was renamed to the Ministry of Foreign Trade and Economic Cooperation (对外贸易经济合作部).

In the spring of 2003, the former Ministry of Foreign Trade and Economic Cooperation went through a reorganization and was renamed Ministry of Commerce. During 2003, the Ministry established Forum Macao in the Macao Special Administrative Region as a multi-lateral mechanism for cooperation between China and the Portuguese-speaking countries.

In 2006, the Ministry of Commerce oversaw the program of "ten thousand businesses advance westward" in conjunction with the Hu-Wen administration's early emphasis on balancing regional development.

The ministry also incorporates the former State Economic and Trade Commission and the State Development Planning Commission.

Ministry of Trade (1949)
Ministry of Foreign Trade | Ministry of Foreign Economic Liaison | State Import and Export Regulation Commission | State Foreign Investment Regulation Commission
Ministry of Foreign Trade and Economic Cooperation (1993) | State Economic and Trade Commission | State Development Planning Commission (1998)
Ministry of Commerce (2003)

Since 2015, the ministry has implemented "overseas talent offshore innovation and entrepreneurship bases" in partnership with institutions abroad for technology transfer purposes.

In 2018, the ministry lost powers and responsibilities regarding anti-monopoly, intellectual property, counterfeit goods, foreign aid, and some financial products to other departments.

Coordinating foreign aid became the responsibility of the newly created China International Development Cooperation Agency (CIDCA). MOFCOM had tended to emphasize the use of aid to support foreign trade objectives, whereas CIDCA has increasingly emphasized the use of aid to support foreign policy objectives. MOFCOM continues to have a role in foreign aid through implementing overseas projects and selecting the firms to undertake them.

== Functions ==
MOFCOM is in charge of the administration of foreign trade and is China's primary foreign trade negotiator. MOFCOM also deals with foreign investment regulation. It works with the National Development and Reform Commission (NDRC) to draft negative lists for foreign investments at the national level and for special economic zones. MOFCOM certifies Chinese firms' international contracting business; Chinese contractors performing work abroad must obtain letters from the MOFCOM Economic and Commercial Office at the Chinese embassy in the host country.

MOFCOM additionally is responsible for developing strategic national plans in the areas of finance and taxation, drafts the central financing budget, supervises central financial expenditures, and audits the budget and accounts of state capital and the national social insurance fund.

MOFCOM is China's most important negotiator in the global governance of intellectual property.

MOFCOM additionally has responsibilities on economic relations with Hong Kong, Macau and Taiwan. To that end the Vice Minister An Min, and the previous Financial Secretary of Hong Kong, Antony Leung, concluded the Closer Economic Partnership Arrangement (CEPA). New agreements are continually negotiated between An and the current Financial Secretary John Tsang under the auspices of the CEPA. Similar agreements were also concluded between the MOFCOM and Secretariat for Economy and Finance of Macau.

In the first decade after the institution of China's Anti-Monopoly Law (2008–2018), MOFCOM was responsible for regulation of mergers under the law. Other antitrust investigations were handled by the State Administration of Industry and Commerce and the NDRC. During that period, MOFCOM prohibited two mergers and imposed remedies in 36 transactions, all of which involved foreign multinational corporations. The State Administration for Market Regulation was created and became China's primary antitrust regulator in 2018.

MOFCOM assists in drafting laws and regulations in its relevant policy areas.

== Leadership ==
A ministerial-level MOFCOM vice minister serves as the International Trade Representative, representing China at bilateral and multilateral trade agreements.

== See also ==
- China International Electronic Commerce Center (CIECC)
- China Investment Promotion Agency (CIPA)
- Ministry of Economic Affairs of the Republic of China
