= China International Development Cooperation Agency =

Foreign aid agency of the Chinese government

China International Development Cooperation Agency (China Aid)
- 国家国际发展合作署
- Logo of the Agency

- Badge of the Agency

Agency overview
- Formed: April 2018; 8 years ago
- Preceding Agency: Department of Foreign Aid of the Ministry of Commerce
- Type: Foreign aid agency
- Status: Active
- Headquarters: Dongcheng District, Beijing
- Motto: "For Shared Future"
- Agency executive: Chen Xiaodong, Director
- Parent Agency: State Council
- Website: www.cidca.gov.cn

China International Development Cooperation Agency
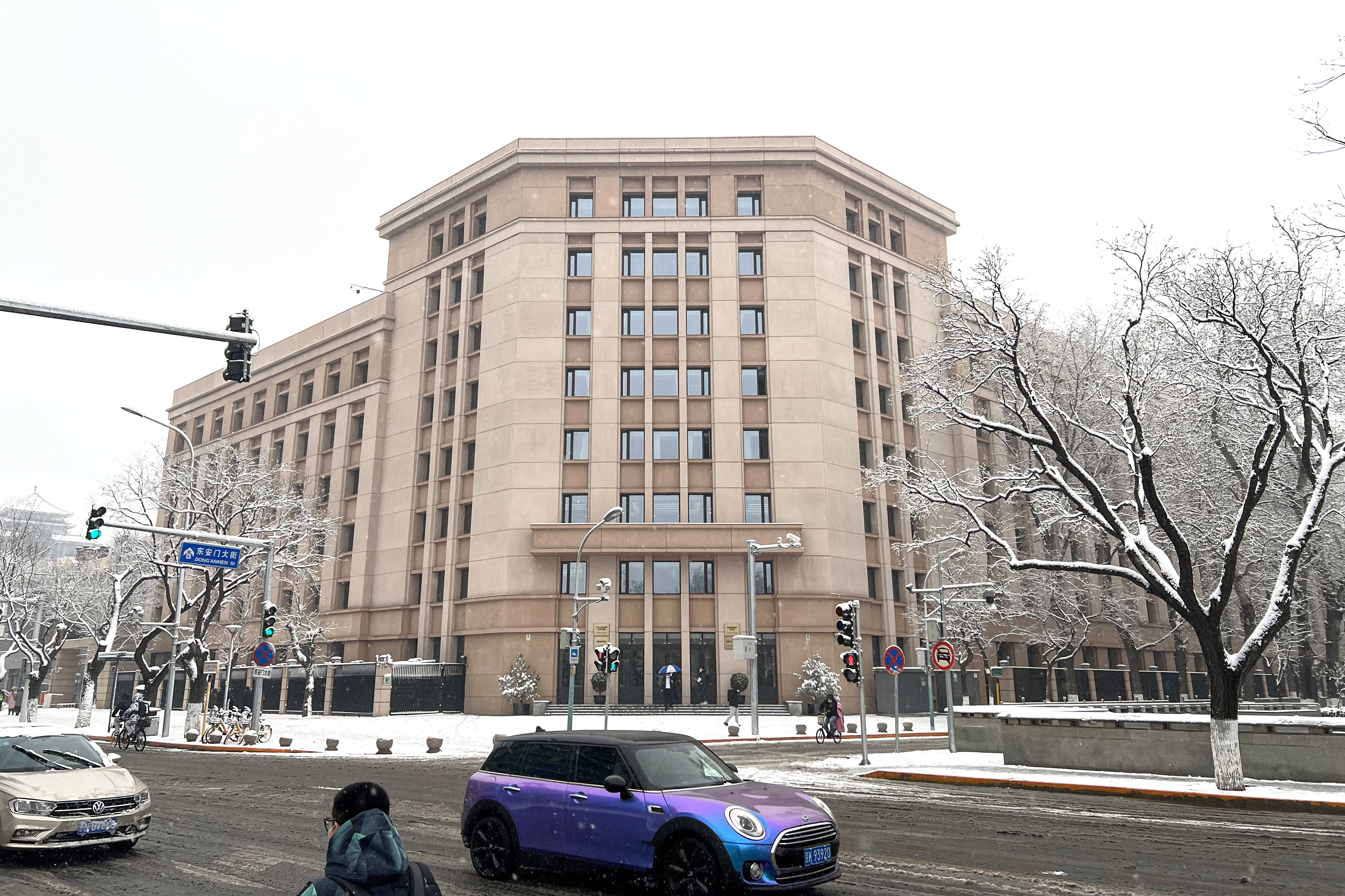
- Headquarters
- Simplified Chinese: 国家国际发展合作署
- Traditional Chinese: 國家國際發展合作署
Transcriptions
Standard Mandarin
- Hanyu Pinyin: Guójiā Guójì Fāzhǎn Hézuò Shǔ

China Aid
- Simplified Chinese: 中国援助
- Traditional Chinese: 中國援助
Transcriptions
Standard Mandarin
- Hanyu Pinyin: Zhōngguó Yuánzhù

The China International Development Cooperation Agency (CIDCA), branded as China Aid, is the foreign aid and international development agency of the People's Republic of China (PRC). It is a deputy ministerial-level agency affiliated with the State Council. Its headquarters are in Dongcheng, Beijing.

== History ==
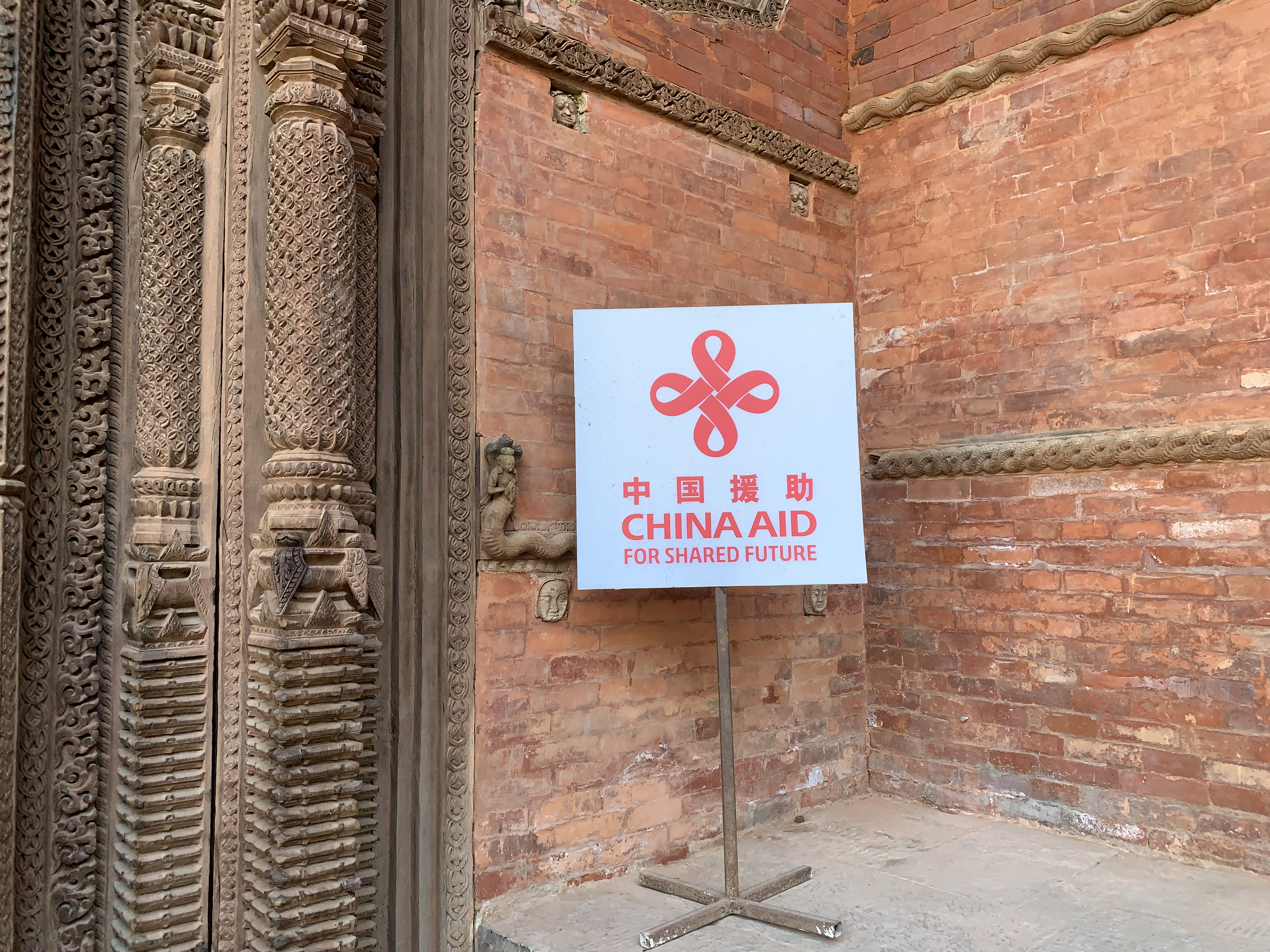
A sign of the CIDCA at Hanuman Dhoka, Kathmandu, Nepal

On 17 March 2018, the first session of the 13th National People's Congress adopted a plan as part of the deepening the reform of the Party and state institutions that stipulated the creation of CIDCA. On 18 April 2018, the CIDCA held an unveiling ceremony at which director of the Central Foreign Affairs Commission Offıce Yang Jiechi and Minister of Foreign Affairs Wang Yi delivered a speech. After the unveiling ceremony, the CIDCA held its founding meeting.

The agency was created to "achieve better coordination and greater impact" of China's aid programs, particularly in support of the Belt and Road Initiative. It was formerly the Department of Foreign Aid of the Ministry of Commerce (MOFCOM).

Former vice foreign minister Luo Zhaohui was appointed CIDCA's director in 2021.

As of at least 2024, CIDCA has placed greater emphasis on using foreign aid to advance foreign policy objectives as opposed to foreign trade objectives.

Following the cutbacks and de facto abolition of USAID under the Second Trump administration for much of 2025, multiple analysts speculate that CIDCA could fill in the void on foreign aid while strategically increasing its influence.

== Functions ==
The CIDCA is China's principle foreign aid agency, and is in charge of foreign aid policy, foreign aid reform, and the planning, negotiation, monitoring, and evaluation of various foreign aid projects. In December 2021, the joint Measures for the Administration of Foreign Aid issued by CIDCA, MOFCOM, and the Ministry of Foreign Affairs state that CIDCA is in charge of drafting aid policies, guidelines, annual plans, and budgets. According to the Measures, MOFCOM is in charge of implementing foreign aid projects and selecting the firms to undertake them while the Ministry of Foreign Affairs makes recommendations based on diplomatic needs and its consulates and embassies supervise overseas projects.

== Organizational structure ==
The CIDCA is a deputy ministerial-level agency affiliated with the State Council. Its headquarters are in Dongcheng District. It operates under the supervision of the Minister of Foreign Affairs under their capacity as State Councilor. According to the "Regulations on the Functional Configuration, Internal Organizations and Staffing of the National International Development Cooperation Agency", the internal organization of the International Development Cooperation Agency is at the deputy department–bureau level, and the following organizations are set up:

=== Departments ===
- General Department
- Policy and Planning Department
- Regional First Department
- Regional Second Department
- Supervision and Evaluation Department
- International Cooperation Department
- Institutional Party Committee (Human Resources Department)

== See also ==
- Chinese foreign aid
- Foreign aid to China
- Export–Import Bank of China
