= China's Rising Foreign Ministry =

2024 academic book by Dylan M.H. Loh

- Author: Dylan M.H. Loh
- Original title: China's Rising Foreign Ministry: Practices and Representations of Assertive Diplomacy
- Language: English
- Series: Studies in Asian Security
- Subject: Chinese foreign policy, diplomacy
- Publisher: Stanford University Press
- Publication date: 2024
- Publication place: United States
- Media type: Print, E-book
- Pages: 240
- ISBN: 9781503638204
- OCLC: 1394113786

China's Rising Foreign Ministry: Practices and Representations of Assertive Diplomacy is a 2024 academic book by political scientist Dylan M.H. Loh, published by Stanford University Press in their 'Studies in Asian Security' series.

== Overview ==
The book analyzes the institutional role and diplomatic practices of China's Ministry of Foreign Affairs (MOFA). Drawing on practice theory and through field interviews, the author examines how MOFA diplomats construct and represent Chinese diplomatic assertiveness in international politics. It argues against convention understandings of MOFA, contending that it has seen its influence rise under Xi Jinping.

The monograph further contends that Chinese state power is not merely constructed through its military or economic capacities, but also generated through day-to-day diplomatic routines, the influence its diplomats can bear to bear in bilateral and multilateral fields, and the institutional habits of MOFA. By treating diplomats as social agents and "street level bureacrats" rather than passive executors of state directives, the book demonstrates how MOFA's micro-level practices shape macro-level foreign policy outcomes and perceptions of China.

China's Rising Foreign Ministry has been reviewed in academic journals such as The China Journal, Political Science Quarterly, Perspectives on Politics, Journal of East Asian Studies, International Affairs, and International Relations of the Asia-Pacific. It has also been profiled on the podcasts of New Books Network, German Marshall Fund and the Center for Strategic & International Studies.

== Awards ==
- 2026: Winner of The Hague Journal of Diplomacy Best Book Award, recognizing the best book on diplomatic theory and practice from 2023-2025.
- 2025: Honorable Mention for the Diplomatic Studies Section (DPLST) Book Prize, sponsored by the International Studies Association.
