= New security concept =

Chinese international security concept

The new security concept (新安全观) is a security policy enunciated by the People's Republic of China in the late 1990s. The concept is that in the post-Cold War period, nations are able to increase their security through diplomatic and economic interaction, and that the Cold War mentality of competing and antagonistic blocs is outdated.

Around 2002 and 2003, this security policy seemed to merge with the foreign policy doctrine known as China's peaceful rise.

The overarching principle of the new security concept is that no single state, even the most powerful, is capable of coping with all security challenges alone.

The new security concept has influenced a number of Chinese foreign policies in the 1990s and early 21st century, including better relations with ASEAN, the formation of the Shanghai Cooperation Organisation and the Treaty of Good-Neighborliness and Friendly Cooperation Between the People's Republic of China and the Russian Federation with Russia, as well as joint efforts with the United States to control nuclear proliferation in North Korea. The concept is part of the background for the Global Security Initiative, which was announced during the 2022 Boao Forum for Asia.

General Secretary of the Chinese Communist Party Xi Jinping's usage of the concept since 2014 is framed in terms of the "indivisibility of security" and the idea of "humanity as an interconnected global community".

== See also ==
- Foreign relations of China
- History of foreign relations of China
- Foreign policy of China
