= Stanford University Press =

American university press

- Stanford University Press
- Founded: 1892
- Country of origin: United States
- Headquarters location: Redwood City, California
- Distribution: Ingram Academic (US); Combined Academic Publishers (UK)
- Publication types: Books
- Imprints: Redwood Press Stanford Briefs Stanford Business Books
- Official website: www.sup.org

Stanford University Press (SUP) is the publishing house of Stanford University. It is one of the oldest academic presses in the United States and the first university press to be established on the West Coast. It is currently a member of the Association of University Presses. The press publishes 130 books per year across the humanities, social sciences, and business and has more than 3,500 titles in print.

== History ==
David Starr Jordan, the first president of Stanford University, posited four propositions to Leland and Jane Stanford when accepting the post, the last of which stipulated, "That provision be made for the publication of the results of any important research on the part of professors, or advanced students. Such papers may be issued from time to time as 'Memoirs of the Leland Stanford Junior University.'" In 1892, the first work of scholarship to be published under the Stanford name, The Tariff Controversy in the United States, 1789-1833, by Orrin Leslie Elliott, appeared with the designation "No. 1" in the "Leland Stanford Junior University Monographs Series." That same year, student Julius Andrew Quelle established a printing company on campus, publishing the student-run newspaper, the Daily Palo Alto (now the Stanford Daily) and Stanford faculty articles and books. The first use of the imprint "Stanford University Press" was in 1895, with The Story of the Innumerable Company, by President Jordan. In 1915, Quelle hired bookbinder John Borsdamm, who would later draw fellow craftspeople to the press, including master printer and eventual manager Will A. Friend. In 1917, the university bought the printing works, making it a division of Stanford.

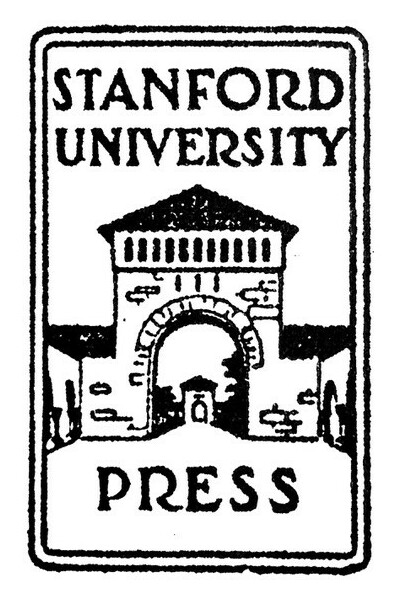
The original Stanford University Press colophon

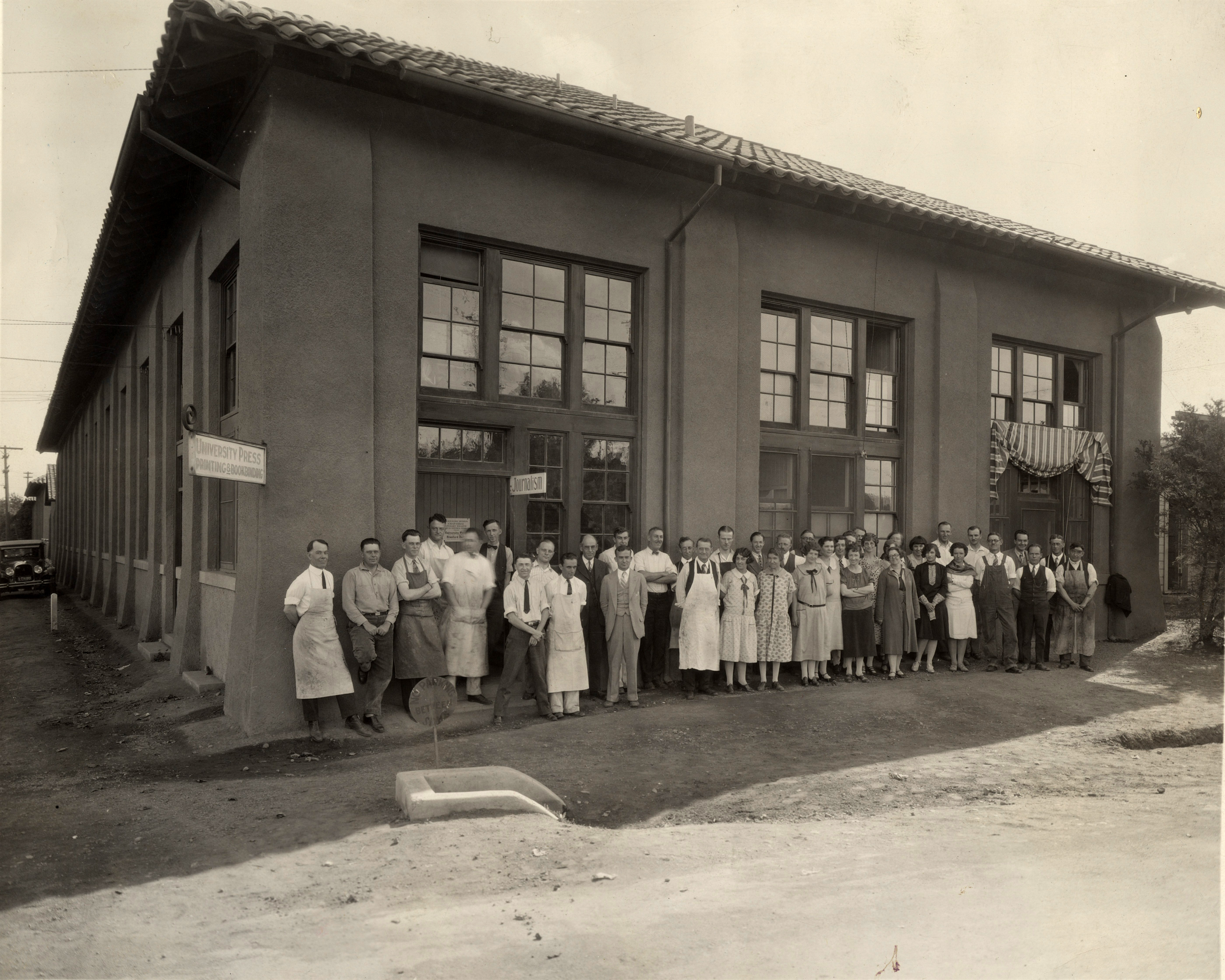
A 1929 photo of the Stanford University Press staff

In 1925, SUP hired William Hawley Davis, Professor of English, to be the inaugural general editor at the press. In the following year, SUP issued its first catalog, listing seventy-five published books. University President Ray Lyman Wilbur established a Special Committee in 1927 comprising the editor, the press manager, the sales manager, and the comptroller in service of the press, whose "principal object is to serve in the publication of University publications of all sorts and to promote human welfare generally."

The first press director, Donald P. Bean, was appointed in 1945. By the 1950s, the printing plant ranked seventh nationally among university presses with respect to title output. The head book designer in the late 1950s and 1960s was printer and typographer Jack Stauffacher, later an AIGA medalist.

In 1999, the press became a division of the Stanford University Libraries. It moved from its previous location adjacent to the Stanford campus to its current location, in Redwood City, in 2012–13.

Stanford Business Books, an imprint for professional titles in business, launched in 2000, with two publications about Silicon Valley. The press launched the Briefs imprint in 2012, featuring short-form publications across its entire list. With funding from the Andrew W. Mellon Foundation, SUP debuted a publishing program for born-digital interactive scholarly works in 2015. That same year, it launched its trade imprint, Redwood Press, with a novel by Bahiyyah Nakhjavani.

In April 2019, the provost of Stanford University announced plans to cease providing funds for the press, drawing widespread criticism. Following protests from Stanford faculty and students, as well as the wider academic and publishing community, the subsidy for the 2019–20 academic year was reinstated, with additional options for future fundraising on the press's part to be discussed.

== Imprints ==
=== Redwood Press ===
Redwood Press publishes books written for a trade audience, spanning a variety of topics, by both academics and non-academic writers.

=== Stanford Briefs ===
Stanford Briefs are essay-length works published across SUP's various disciplines.

=== Stanford Business Books ===
The Stanford Business Books imprint is home to academic trade books, professional titles, texts for course use, and monographs that explore the social science side of business.

== Digital publishing ==
SUP's digital projects initiative, funded by the Andrew W. Mellon Foundation, advances a formal channel for peer review and publication of born-digital scholarly works in the fields of digital humanities and computational social sciences.

== Notable series ==
- Asian America
- Cold War International History Project
- The Collected Poetry of Robinson Jeffers
- The Complete Works of Friedrich Nietzsche
- Cultural Lives of the Law
- Cultural Memory in the Present
- Innovation and Technology in the World Economy
- Meridian: Crossing Aesthetics, founded by Werner Hamacher
- Post*45
- South Asia in Motion
- Square One: First-Order Questions in the Humanities
- Stanford Studies in Comparative Race and Ethnicity
- Stanford Studies in Human Rights
- Stanford Studies in Jewish History and Culture
- Stanford Studies in Middle Eastern and Islamic Societies and Cultures
- Studies in Asian Security
- Studies in Social Inequality
- Studies of the Walter H. Shorenstein Asia-Pacific Research Center

== Notable publications ==
- The Tariff Controversy in the United States, 1789–1833, by Orrin Leslie Elliott
  - The first book published in the Leland Stanford Junior University Monographs series
- The Story of the Innumerable Company, by David Starr Jordan
  - The first book published with the Stanford University Press imprint
- Illustrated Flora of the Pacific States, by LeRoy Abrams
- Between Pacific Tides, by Ed Ricketts and Jack Calvin (1939)
  - The 1948 edition would feature a foreword by John Steinbeck
- The Art of Falconry, by Frederick II of Hohenstaufen, translated and edited by Casey A. Wood and F. Marjorie Fyfe
- The Ancient Maya, by Sylvanus Griswold Morley (1946)
- Radiographic Atlas of Skeletal Development of the Hand and Wrist, by William Walter Greulich and S. Idell Pyle
- The Complete Essays of Montaigne, translated by Donald M. Frame
- Pearl Harbor: Warning and Decision, by Roberta Wohlstetter (1962)
- Origins of the Chinese Revolution, 1915–1949, by Lucien Bianco
- The Many-Splendored Fishes of Hawaii, by Gar Goodson
- The Sexual Contract, by Carole Pateman (1988)
- The Collected Poetry of Robinson Jeffers, 5 vols., edited by Tim Hunt (1988–2002)
  - Stanford University Press would also publish The Collected Letters of Robinson Jeffers, 3 vols., edited by James Karman (2009–15)
- The Epic of Gilgamesh, translated with an introduction and notes by Maureen Gallery Kovacs (1989)
- Fiction in the Archives: Pardon Tales and their Tellers in Sixteenth Century France, by Natalie Zemon Davis (1990)
- A Preponderance of Power: National Security, the Truman Administration, and the Cold War, by Melvyn P. Leffler (1992)
- Homo Sacer: Sovereign Power and Bare Life, by Giorgio Agamben (1998)
- The Life and Times of Pancho Villa, by Friedrich Katz (1998)
- The Silicon Valley Edge: A Habitat for Innovation and Entrepreneurship, edited by Chong-Moon Lee, William F. Miller, Marguerite Gong Hancock, and Henry S. Rowan (2000)
  - The inaugural title in the Stanford Business Books imprint
- Dialectic of Enlightenment, by Max Horkheimer and Theodor W. Adorno (2002)
- The Zohar, 12 vols., translated with commentary by Daniel Matt (2003–17)
- The Physics of Business Growth, edited by Edward Hess and Jeanne Liedtka (2012)
  - The inaugural title in the Stanford Briefs imprint
- Common Knowledge? An Ethnography of Wikipedia, by Dariusz Jemielniak (2014)
- The Woman Who Read Too Much, by Bahiyyah Nakhjavani (2015)
  - The inaugural title in the Redwood Press imprint
- The Burnout Society, by Byung-Chul Han (Briefs, 2015)
- Enchanting the Desert, by Nicholas Bauch (2016)
  - The inaugural digital project published by supDigital
- Crook County: Racism and Injustice in America's Largest Criminal Court, by Nicole Gonzalez Van Cleve (2016)
- The Omnibus Homo Sacer, by Giorgio Agamben (2017)
- Enemies and Friends 1967

== Major awards ==
Major award won by the press and its publications are as follows:

- Bancroft Prize (1962): Pearl Harbor: Warning and Decision
- Bancroft Prize (1993): A Preponderance of Power: National Security, the Truman Administration, and the Cold War
- René Welleck Prize, American Comparative Literature Association (1996): The Problem of a Chinese Aesthetic
- Bryce Wood Book Award, Latin American Studies Association (2000); Albert J. Beveridge Award, American Historical Association (1999): The Life and Times of Pancho Villa
- Aldo and Jeanne Scaglione Prize for Comparative Literary Studies, Modern Language Association (2003): The Rhetoric of Romantic Prophecy
- Gold Medal, California Book Awards, Commonwealth Club of California (2009): Asian American Art: A History, 1850–1970
- Nautilus Book Award (2010): Companies on a Mission
- National Jewish Book Award, Jewish Book Council (2010): From Continuity to Contiguity: Toward a New Jewish Literary Thinking
- National Jewish Book Award in Women's Studies, Jewish Book Council (2010): Memoirs of a Grandmother: Scenes from the Cultural History of the Jews of Russia in the Nineteenth Century, Volume 1
- Yonatan Shapiro Book Prize, Association of Israel Studies (2011); National Jewish Book Award in Sephardic Culture, Jewish Book Council (2011): Ottoman Brothers: Muslims, Christians, and Jews in Early Twentieth-Century Palestine
- National Jewish Book Award in Sephardic Culture, Jewish Book Council (2014): Sephardi Lives: A Documentary History, 1700–1950
- National Jewish Book Award in Women's Studies, Jewish Book Council (2014); Fenia and Yaakov Leviant Memorial Prize, Modern Language Association (2015): A Question of Tradition: Women Poets in Yiddish, 1586–1987
- Prose Award for Excellence in Social Sciences (2017); American Sociological Association Distinguished Scholarly Book Award: Crook County: Racism and Injustice in America's Largest Criminal Court
- Independent Publisher Book Award (2018): Witnesses of the Unseen: Seven Years in Guantanamo
- Hayek Book Prize, Manhattan Institute for Policy Research (2018): The High Cost of Good Intentions: A History of U.S. Federal Entitlement Programs
- Palestine Book Award, Middle East Monitor (2018): Brothers Apart: Palestinian Citizens of Israel and the Arab World
- Gold in Success/Motivation/Coaching, Axiom Business Book Award (2019): Life Is a Startup: What What Founders Can Teach Us about Making Choices and Managing Change
- Gold in Autobiography/Memoir III (Personal Struggle/Health Issues), Independent Publisher Book Award: Nisei Naysayer: The Memoir of Militant Japanese American Journalist Jimmie Omura
- Joseph Levenson Pre-1900 Book Prize, Association for Asian Studies (2019): A World Trimmed with Fur: Wild Things, Pristine Places, and the Natural Fringes of Qing Rule
- The Hague Journal of Diplomacy Best Book Award (2026): China's Rising Foreign Ministry

== 1933 murder case ==
In 1933, David Lamson, a sales manager at SUP, was accused of murdering his wife, Allene, at their home on the Stanford campus. The novelist and poet Janet Lewis, campaigning for Lamson's acquittal, wrote a pamphlet emphasizing the dangers of using circumstantial evidence. Lamson was ultimately released after being tried four times.

== See also ==
- List of English-language book publishing companies
- List of university presses
