= China International Electronic Commerce Center =

China International Electron Commerce Center (CIECC) is a government agency operating under the Ministry of Commerce of the People's Republic of China, that develops {Electron} information projects.

CIECC also facilitates international cooperation and exchanges in the electronic commerce with other countries at the state level.

The CIECC's English translation website appears to be not maintained, however the website for native Chinese speakers is updated daily.

== M-Commerce Lab ==
The M-Commerce Laboratory is designed to bridge the gap among industry, government and academia to facilitate certain aspects in the M-Commerce environment such as research and commercialization of mobile applications, mobile payment and security, and enterprise mobile commerce application. By providing an environment to study, develop and promote projects in the mobile commerce domain, the laboratory helps to enhance end-to-end innovation capabilities.
