= Foreign policy of China =

The People's Republic of China emerged as a great power and one of the three big players in the tri-polar geopolitics (PRC-US-USSR) during the Cold War, after the Korean War in 1950–1953 and the Sino-Soviet split in the 1960s, with its status as a recognized nuclear weapons state. Currently, China has one of the world's largest populations, second largest GDP (nominal) and the largest economy in the world by PPP. By law, the Chinese Communist Party (CCP) has authority over the country's foreign policy.

In 1950–1953 it fought an undeclared war in Korea against the United States. Until the late 1950s it was allied with the Soviet Union but by 1960 they began a bitter contest for control over the local communist movement in many countries. It reached détente with the United States in 1972. After CCP chairman Mao Zedong died in 1976, Deng Xiaoping led a massive process of reform and opening up and emphasized trade relations with the world, while maintaining a less ideological foreign policy, widely described by the phrase "hide one's talent and bide one's time". The Chinese economy grew very rapidly giving it steadily increasing power and ambition.

Since Xi Jinping became general secretary of the Chinese Communist Party in 2012, China has expanded its foreign policy ambitions on the global scale, even as it retains an emphasis on 'periphery diplomacy' or its neighborhood. China is investing heavily in global infrastructure, citing a desire for economic integration. It is also investing in strategic locations to secure its trade and security interests. It calls these programs the Belt and Road Initiative (formerly "One Belt, One Road") and the "Maritime Silk Road", which it sees as part of its goal of self-sufficiency.

Since 2017 it has engaged in a large-scale trade war with the United States. It is also challenging U.S. dominance in the Pacific and Indian Ocean, expanding its military naval and diplomatic efforts. Part of this is the String of Pearls strategy securing strategic locations in the Indian Ocean and Strait of Malacca region.

== Foreign policy institutions ==
According to the Foreign Relations Law of the People's Republic of China, the Chinese Communist Party (CCP) leads the country's foreign policy. The main institutions of foreign policy are the CCP's Central Foreign Affairs Commission, Ministry of Foreign Affairs, the CCP International Liaison Department, and the CCP United Front Work Department. Generally, the head of the Foreign Affairs Commission's Office has greater authority than the Minister of Foreign Affairs.

Historically, the People's Liberation Army had greater influence in China's foreign affairs, particularly during the early years of the PRC. The influence of the Ministry of Foreign Affairs within China's foreign policy establishment has increased since 2009.

The Central Foreign Affairs Leadership Small Group (FALSG) has historically been a semi-institutional foreign policy coordination body. Created in 1958, it was disbanded during the Cultural Revolution and restored in 1981 as Deng Xiaoping increased the number of stakeholders involved in the development of foreign policy. It became a forum for the central leadership in charge of foreign policy to meet regularly with top bureaucrats to discuss priorities, achieve consensus, and prepare recommendations for the CCP Politburo. It was the only standing foreign policy coordination body until the aftermath of the United States bombing of the Chinese embassy in Belgrade, which prompted the creation of the Central National Security Leadership Small Group (NSLSG) in 2000 to coordinate national security crisis response. In 2018, the FALSG was renamed as the Central Foreign Affairs Commission, which was a politically significant move because a commission ranks higher than a leading small group.

China's media policy on foreign affairs issues is handled by the Central Leading Group for Propaganda, Ideology and Culture in consultation with the Central Foreign Affairs Commission. Long-term and medium-term media policies on foreign affairs matters are announced at the National Propaganda Thought Work Meetings and the annual National Conferences of Publicity Department Directors.

To address policy coordination on maritime issues, CCP general secretary Hu Jintao created The Protecting Maritime Rights and Interests LSG in 2012.

In his effort to build additional institutional capacity for foreign policy coordination, Xi Jinping created the National Security Commission (NSC), which absorbed the NSLG. The NSC's focus is holistic national security and it addresses both external and internal security matters. Xi introduced the holistic security concept in 2014, which he defined as taking "the security of the people as compass, political security as its roots, economic security as its pillar, military security, cultural security, and cultural security as its protections, and that relies on the promotion of international security."

Although various actors in the Chinese party-state contest foreign policy decision making, Chinese foreign policy is overwhelmingly top-down in decision-making and implementation.

China traditionally operates separate tracks of government-to-government and party-to-party relations, the latter for example via the CCP's International Liaison Department.

On security issues, China generally prioritizes military-to-military exchanges. China typically views military personnel as more effective interlocutors on security matters than civil personnel.

== International relations framework ==
Chinese scholars observe that the country's international relations differentiate between major powers, states on China's strategic periphery, developing countries, and multilateral international fora. These categorizations are not strict and multiple may apply. The major powers are the economically developed states, including the United States, Russia, Japan, United Kingdom, and various European Union states as well as the European Union as a whole. Strategic periphery countries are generally geographically proximate ones, traditionally including Russia, East Asia, Central Asia, South Asia, and Southeast Asia. China began increasing its focus on peripheral diplomacy during the Hu Jintao era. during the Xi Jinping era, the Belt and Road Initiative is closely associated with China's peripheral diplomacy.

Generally, China tends to take the side of developing countries. In the broader category of developing countries, China distinguishes between major developing states, newly emerging powers, and other developing states.

China establishes bilateral partnerships with other countries that range from broad strategic partnerships to those with more discrete areas of cooperation. "Comprehensive strategic partnerships" are the broadest, with "strategic partnerships" and "comprehensive cooperative partnerships" used to describe relations with less broad cooperation. China generally avoids signing formal alliances and bilateral treaties. It describes this position as "relationship based on partnership rather than alliance" (jieban bujiemeng).

Chinese foreign policy documents with countries it views as strategic partners frequently assert the concepts of the validity of different developmental paths, different understandings of democracy or human rights, and noninterference in domestic affairs. In its free trade agreements and global engagement on intellectual property issues, it takes a position of non-imposition on intellectual property matters. Although it is willing to accept increased standards itself, China does not generally seek to impose standards in excess of the TRIPS Agreement.

Within the Global South, China focuses particularly on countries it views as hub states in each region. Although Chinese diplomatic understandings change over time, hub states have often included Indonesia, Singapore, and Thailand (in Southeast Asia); India and Pakistan (in South Asia); Kazakhstan in Central Asia; Egypt, Ethiopia, and Nigeria (in Africa), Iran and Saudi Arabia (in the Middle East); and Argentina and Brazil (in Latin America). China conducts good relations including with hub states that are regional rivals with each other, often seeking to use summit diplomacy and regional cooperation forums in an effort to reduce tensions.

China provides foreign aid to advance both foreign policy objectives and foreign trade objectives. Since the 2018 creation of the China International Development Cooperation Agency to coordinate aid, China has placed greater emphasis on aid to facilitate foreign policy and a lesser emphasis on aid to advance foreign trade.

During the Xi Jinping administration, China seeks to shape international norms and rules in emerging policy areas where China has an advantage as an early participant. Xi describes such areas as "new frontiers," and they include policy areas such as space, deep sea, polar regions, the Internet, nuclear safety, anticorruption, and climate change. Scholars have also noted that China's Ministry of Foreign Affairs' influence and profile has grown under Xi.

=== Problems of translation ===
A 2022 study published by Leiden University found that almost half of the translated foreign-policy documents of the PRC from 2013 to 2019 had differences between the English and Chinese versions that might change how a reader views PRC intentions.

== Long-term goals ==
Since the late 1970s, China's primary foreign policy goals are safeguarding its independence, sovereignty, territorial integrity, and shaping an international environment favorable to its modernization and reform and opening up.

China uses the term core interests to define the primary goals that determine its foreign policy choices. This concept was developed by diplomat Dai Bingguo during Hu Jintao's administration. The core interests are: maintaining the power of the CCP, continuing China's social and economic growth, and preservation of China's sovereignty and territorial integrity. China also views these core interests as red lines that other countries' behavior should not cross. China's emphasis on national sovereignty arises from its historical experiences following the Opium Wars.

During the Xi Jinping era, the Community of Common Destiny has become China's most important foreign relations formulation.

Political scientist Dmitry Shlapentokh argues that Xi and his top leadership are developing plans for global predominance based on rapidly growing economic power. The ideological framework is a specialized blend of Marxism–Leninism, coupled with China's pre-1800 historic claims to world dominance. China's trade policy and drive for access to essential natural resources, such as gas, are articulated in terms of these ideological approaches. Beijing balances both purely economic goals with geopolitical strategies regarding the United States, Russia and other powers. According to Shlapentokh, balancing those two powers gives China a clear advantage, for its totalitarian government could plan for generations and could change course regardless of the wishes of the electorate or clearly defined interest groups, as is the case with the modern capitalist West.

Lowell Dittmer argues that in dealing with the goal of dominance over East Asia, Beijing has to juggle its relations with the United States, which has more military and economic power in the region because of close U.S. ties with Japan, South Korea, Taiwan, Vietnam, Australia and other countries.

Analysts argue that Beijing is not yet ready to become a major force in shaping regional politics in the Middle East. While China has major commercial interests in the Middle East and a long history of relations with Gulf Cooperation Council countries, its involvement in Gulf security affairs is relatively recent. China articulates a "zero-enemy policy" in the Gulf region, taking a balanced attitude towards both incumbent governments and opposition forces, Sunni and Shi'a, republics and monarchies, and Iran and the Arab countries. Some scholars suggest that China's diplomatic strategy in the Middle East is best understood through “role theory,” which frames Beijing's actions as a negotiated performance between its self-perception and the expectations of others. According to a 2025 review of China’s Changing Role in the Middle East: Filling a Power Vacuum?, China avoids military entanglements while expanding influence through infrastructure projects, symbolic neutrality, and adaptive diplomacy that balances ties between rival actors such as Iran and the Gulf States.

Since the late 1990s, China has articulated its new security concept, the overarching principle of which is that no single state, even the most powerful, is capable of coping with all security challenges alone.

China has shown a moderate interest in the Caribbean region in recent years, but not nearly on the same scale as its interest in Asia and Africa. It has been developing ties with Cuba, the Bahamas, Jamaica, the Dominican Republic and Haiti, as well as Colombia. These small countries have not by 2019 noticeably changed their foreign or domestic policies because of their new economic linkages with China. Nevertheless, the governments pay more attention to Beijing's views. On the other hand, China's push into the Caribbean is increasingly resented by the United States and further escalation between the two major powers is a possibility in the region.

In 2014, Xi announced the New Asian Security Concept at a summit of the Conference on Interaction and Confidence-Building in Asia (CICA). Implying that Asian countries can handle their security without the involvement of the United States, the core of the New Asian Security Concept is that "Asian issues should be taken care of by Asians, and Asian security should be maintained by Asians."

China is generally skeptical about the efficacy of sanctions, often characterizing them as a Western instrument of oppression that escalates tensions. China opposes the use of unilateral sanctions and trade discrimination to achieve foreign policy goals and has generally positioned itself as a proponent of global free trade. China contends that economic interdependence reduces the risk of conflict between countries. China advocates for the role of the WTO as the primary multilateral trade forum. The pace of China's bilateral free trade agreement negotiations has accelerated since 2007, when free trade agreements were identified as a national priority following the CCP's Seventeenth National Congress.

== Non-interventionism ==
In its foreign policy, China emphasizes the principle of non-interventionism. Its emphasis on non-intervention is based on the UN Charter-enshrined idea that of respect for the sovereignty of member states. China has articulated the principle of non-interventionism since the 1950 Sino-Soviet Treaty of Friendship, Alliance, and Mutual Assistance and made it central component of foreign policy after its inclusion in the 1953 Five Principles of Peaceful Coexistence. China's view is that international intervention, especially the use of force under Chapter IV of the UN Charter, is only legitimate with both authorization of the Security Council and the consent of the parties involved.

China also contends that many internal crises or conflicts are beyond the scope of the Security Council's mandate. Generally, it seeks to avoid siding with unilaterally with a particular camp in regional conflicts. As a corollary to China's principles of non-interventionism, China asserts that other countries must not involve themselves in matters that China deems as its own domestic affairs.

As part of its non-interventionism, China does not support opposition movements in other countries, particularly those advocating separatism.

When China provides debt relief, it generally does not require recipient countries to alter their domestic macroeconomic policy. China views its position in this regard as consistent with its non-interventionism.

China's approach to non-interventionism has been particularly well received in its relations with African countries. At the 2018 Forum on China-Africa Cooperation, Xi Jinping emphasized the "Five Nos" which guide its foreign policy in dealing with African countries and other developing countries: (1) non-interference in other countries' pursuit of development paths suitable to their national conditions, (2) non-interference in domestic affairs, (3) not imposing China's will on others, (4) not attaching political conditions to foreign aid, and (5) not seeking political self-interest in investment and financing.

At times, China has modified its approach to non-intervention, particularly because of political issues involving Africa. These changes began in 2006, when under pressure from Western governments and the 2008 Summer Olympics in Beijing, China altered its position on the Darfur conflict. Chinese leader Hu Jintao visited Sudan and met with Sudanese President Omar al-Bashir, who afterwards accepted the United Nations-Africa Union peacekeeping mission in Darfur.

China also modified its typically non-interventionist approach during the 2011 Libyan crisis, when pressure from the African Union and the Arab League prompted China to support an arms embargo, travel ban, and asset freeze and to abstain from voting on United Nations Security Council Resolution 1973, which established a no-fly zone. The necessity of evacuating over 35,000 Chinese citizens in a period of ten days during the crisis also shaped China's policy approach to conflict zones.

== South-South cooperation ==
China's emphasis on South-South cooperation developed from the 1955 Bandung Conference, where it cultivated ties with other developing countries as a hedge against the United States and the Soviet Union.

In 1971, China began expressing its view of international solidarity through the concept of "Chairman Mao's Revolutionary Diplomatic Line" (Mao zhuxi geming waijiao luxian). The concept included both efforts to engage with the peoples of Asia, Africa, and Latin America in opposition to imperialism, as well as China's view of solidarity with workers and oppressed peoples in the capitalist and imperialist countries. The idea largely reflected the principles developed at the Bandung Conference, but added an ideological framing for engaging with capitalist countries by distinguishing "the people" of these countries from the policies of their governments, which China continued to criticize.

During the administration of Hu Jintao between 2002 and 2012, China began to increase the importance it placed on relations with Global South countries. This trend has continued during the general secretaryship of Xi Jinping since 2012. As part of its view of South-South Cooperation, China often votes in the United Nations based on the position of regional groups like the African Union or the Arab League.

China has a major role in fostering cooperation among the global south countries in the area of climate change and clean energy. China engaged in South-South climate and clean energy cooperation through: (1) bilateral clean energy agreements, (2) multilateral clean energy cooperation, (3) expanding exports of its clean energy technology to other developing countries, and (4) foreign energy infrastructure development via the Belt and Road Initiative. Much of China's overall South-South Cooperation is now explicitly linked to the BRI. The BRI is likewise tied to the concepts of the Chinese dream and the Community of Common Destiny.

The "Ten, Hundred, Thousand" program is China's overarching initiative for South-South cooperation in addressing climate change. As of 2023, China had signed partnerships with at least 27 other developing countries as part of this initiative. Through framing BRI and other economic mechanisms as South-South cooperation, China seeks to position itself as a global South leader and draw a contrast with the global North countries.

BRICS is a further mechanism for China's cooperation with the global south and functions as a forum for policy coordination among its members.

Publishing in 2024, academics Xinru Ma and David C. Kang write that in its South-South relations, China does not attempt to export its ideology or leadership to other countries.

== Diplomatic style ==
The Chinese diplomatic style generally downplays the significance of individual diplomats and their personalities.

China has generally become more assertive in foreign affairs since 2008, particularly in its relations with the United States, Europe, and the Asia-Pacific countries. According to academic Suisheng Zhao, China is motivated in part by the desire to restore itself from a self-perceived state of victimhood in international affairs.

=== Wolf warrior diplomacy ===
Wolf warrior diplomacy is a confrontational form of public diplomacy adopted by diplomats of the People's Republic of China in the late 2010s and early 2020s. The phrase is derived from the Chinese action film franchise Wolf Warrior (2015) and its 2017 sequel. Analysts have characterized this style of diplomacy as coercive, and in contrast both to the narrative of "China's peaceful rise" and to diplomatic practices which emphasize the use of cooperative rhetoric and the avoidance of controversy (often termed Taoguang Yanghui), financial aid (checkbook diplomacy), the provision of medical supplies such as COVID-19 masks (medical diplomacy), and panda diplomacy.

== Status of Taiwan ==
The People's Republic of China (PRC) considers Taiwan area administered by Republic of China (ROC), part of its inviolable sovereign territory. The ROC was founded in mainland China in 1912 deposing the Chinese monarchy while Taiwan was under Japanese rule from 1895 and regained in 1945, but Taiwan became the seat of the ROC central government since 1949 and later lost its international representation as "China" in the United Nations in 1971 to the PRC.

Along with the ROC, in PRC's perspective, Taiwan is described a separatist, breakaway province that must be reunified, by force if necessary. The PRC considers territorial integrity and national unity as the central focus of its cross-strait policies. It has adjusted its cross-strait policies over time based on the economic and foreign policy environments, including domestic politics on Taiwan. The PRC engages more closely with Taiwan when the Kuomintang (which ostensibly supports Chinese unification and favors closer ties with the PRC) are in power in Taiwan, and is more hostile when the Democratic Progressive Party (which the PRC construes as independence minded and collaborating with foreign powers) is in power in Taiwan.

Under the One China policy, any polity exerts efforts for countries recognizing either the PRC or ROC to switch their recognition to the other.

In 2005, the PRC has passed the Anti-Secession Law authorizing the use of military force in the event of unilateral separatist activity.

== South China Sea ==
China has staked its territorial claims in the disputed South China Sea with the nine-dash line. Its claims are disputed by other countries. The contested area in the South China Sea includes the Paracel Islands, the Spratly Islands, and various other areas including Pratas Island and the Vereker Banks, the Macclesfield Bank and the Scarborough Shoal. The claim encompasses the area of Chinese land reclamation known as the "Great Wall of Sand".

The United States Navy has conducted freedom of navigation operations asserting its position that some waters claimed by China are international waters.

On July 12, 2016, an arbitral tribunal constituted under Annex VII to the 1982 United Nations Convention on the Law of the Sea ruled that China has no legal basis to claim "historic rights" within its nine-dash line in a case brought by the Philippines. The tribunal judged that there was no evidence that China had historically exercised exclusive control over the waters or resources within the Nine-Dash Line.

The ruling was rejected by both Taiwan and China. The People's Republic of China and the Republic of China (Taiwan) stated that they did not recognize the tribunal and insisted that the matter should be resolved through bilateral negotiations with other claimants. However, the tribunal did not rule on the ownership of the islands or delimit maritime boundaries.

Scholars have been probing the Chinese motivations and long-term expectations. One approach is to compare trends in multilateral Code of Conduct negotiations between 1992 and 2016. In general, the sovereignty issue regarding contested waters is no longer a central major concern. For three reasons: the inconsistency of China's official claims over time, China's increased bargaining power, and the importance of the shelved sovereignty axiom since the era of Deng Xiaoping.

== See also ==
- South China Sea disputes
- Maritime Silk Road
- String of Pearls (Indian Ocean)
- Political status of Taiwan
- History of foreign relations of China
- Old friends of the Chinese people
