= List of theaters built by China as aid =

The construction of theaters, opera houses, and other cultural facilities by China as gifts to foreign countries is a part of China's foreign aid program. In a white paper published by China in 2009 on its aid projects in the area of civil construction, the building of cultural facilities is one of the types identified among a total of 2,025 projects stated as built by a Chinese grant or no-interest loan to the recipient country.

Nelum Pokuna Mahinda Rajapaksa Theatre in Sri Lanka

- Algeria
  - A national opera house in Algiers is under construction as a US$40 million gift by China to Algeria. The foundation stone for the 1400-seat venue was laid in a ceremony in November 2012.
- Cameroon
  - The Palais des Congrès de Yaoundé was built by China and opened in 1982. The venue is a 1,500-seat multipurpose performance hall with "an ultra-modern stage boasting the country's best sound and lighting equipment."
- Cape Verde
  - National Auditorium
- Ghana
  - The National Theatre in Accra was opened in January 1993 after construction by China. The theatre is a gift as the loan from China funding the construction would later be cancelled in 2007. China granted a further US$2 million to refurbish the theatre for Ghana's golden jubilee celebrations.
  - The Drama Studio at the University of Ghana at Legon was built under the program as the original work on the National Theatre.
- Mauritius
  - The Plaza Theatre in Rose Hill was renovated in 2008 using funds provided by China in the form of a non-interest loan.
- Senegal
  - The Grand Theatre in Dakar was constructed from 2008 to 2011 by Complant as a gift. The six-storey, 1800-seat theatre was built at a cost of 16 billion CFA francs, of which China paid 14 billion CFA francs and Senegal contributed the rest.
  - Construction on a Museum of Black Civilization located in Dakar began in 2011, funded by a grant of $US30 million from China. The contractor for the project is the Shanghai Construction Group.
- Somalia
  - National Theatre of Somalia was built by China as a gift to Somalia in 1967.
- Sri Lanka
  - Nelum Pokuna Mahinda Rajapaksa Theatre is theatre in Colombo built in 2011 by China as gift to enhance ties with Sri Lanka. Construction of the 1288-seat venue was handled by the Yanjian Group.
- Trinidad and Tobago
  - National Academy for the Performing Arts in Port of Spain
