= Enemies and Friends =

1967 book by Lyman P. Van Slyke

Enemies and Friends: The United Front in Chinese Communist History is a 1967 book by Lyman P. Van Slyke, published by Stanford University Press. It discusses the Chinese Communist Party (CCP).

== Background ==
The author did much of his research towards this book at University of California, Berkeley. Van Slyke used documents, which originated from China, located in Taiwan as sources. Earl Browder of Princeton, New Jersey stated that not all of the sourcing available had been consulted for the work.

== Reception ==
Howard Boorman of Vanderbilt University stated that the work "adds an important stone on the path towards critical understanding of" the subject.

Browder stated in a book review that the author successfully showed justifications for his positions with the sourcing he used, and that the book is "formidable".
