= Chinese foreign aid =

Development assistance from China

Chinese foreign aid may be considered as both governmental (official) and private development aid and humanitarian aid originating from the People's Republic of China (PRC).

Chinese official aid - unlike most major nation-state sources of aid - is not regulated and measured under the OECD's protocols for official development assistance (ODA). According to OECD estimates, 2020 official development assistance from China increased to US$4.8 billion. In this respect, the program is similar in monetary size to those of Norway and Canada. China, however, provides a larger amount of development finance in the form of less-concessional loans. The Chinese government represents its aid as characterised by a framework of South-South cooperation and "not interfering in the internal affairs of the recipient countries".

In 2018, China established the China International Development Cooperation Agency (CIDCA) to have the main responsibility for coordinating the country's foreign aid. Other government bodies continue to have roles in administering foreign aid from China.

== History ==
China's approach to foreign aid has changed a number of times since the 1949 establishment of the PRC, often prompted by changing domestic circumstances and domestic politics.

During the Mao era, China focused on providing aid to other countries in support of socialist and anti-imperialist causes. An early instance was the donation of CHF 20 million to Egypt 1956 during the Suez Crisis. By the 1960s, China was more broadly providing aid to dozens of Third World countries in Asia and Africa. When China began its foreign aid program, it was the only poor country that was supplying outbound foreign aid, even providing assistance to countries that had a higher GDP per capita than China. Although China also received foreign aid, it was a net donor of foreign aid during this period.

During the Cold War, China's foreign aid was often motivated by geopolitics, particularly the issue of international recognition of the PRC (as opposed to the Republic of China government on Taiwan).

From 1956 to 1976, China provided $3.665 billion in foreign aid to the third world. China provided ten percent of these aid funds to Middle Eastern countries.

From 1970 and 1975, China helped finance and build the TAZARA Railway in East Africa, which cost about $500m, and as of 2012 was considered to be China's largest-ever single-item aid project. In 1974 (near the end of Mao Zedong's period as China's leader), aid reached the remarkably high proportion of 2% of gross national product. The proportion declined greatly thereafter although the absolute quantity of aid has risen with China's growing prosperity.

During the Reform and Opening Up era, China deemed revolutionary-oriented foreign aid no longer financially feasible. The motivation of aid became more pragmatic and less about promoting ideology. Outgoing aid was decreased and redirected towards smaller projects which were more likely to be sustainable. China also received increased amounts of development finance, including from Japan and the World Bank, and became a net recipient of foreign aid.

China again changed its foreign aid approach in the 1990s. Following the Cold War, China's participation in foreign aid was increasingly motivated by economic interests, especially resource security.

China again became a net provider of foreign development finance in 2005.

Since the mid-2010s, China has announced a series of large-scale foreign aid commitments. In September 2015, during the United Nations' 70th anniversary summit, China pledged the "Six 100s" （6个100）initiative, which included 100 projects each in poverty reduction, agriculture, trade, climate, healthcare, and education. It also established the South-South Cooperation Assistance Fund and the China-UN Peace and Development Fund, and expanded training and scholarship programs for developing countries.

In May 2017, at the first Belt and Road Forum for International Cooperation, China pledged RMB 60 billion in aid for livelihood projects and emergency food assistance, and increased funding for South-South cooperation.

The China International Development Cooperation Agency (CIDCA) was created in 2018 to help streamline the process of China's foreign aid, in which the ministries of commerce and foreign affairs and the State Council are also involved. Since 2018, it has had an increasingly significant role in coordinating aid and has done so with a greater focus on foreign policy objectives and opposed to foreign trade objectives.

In 2019, at the second Belt and Road Forum, China announced initiatives to deepen cooperation in agriculture, health, disaster reduction, and water resources, and launched a Belt and Road South-South Cooperation plan on climate change. It also pledged support for scholarship programs and invited 10,000 participants from partner countries for exchanges in China.

In May 2020, in response to the COVID-19 pandemic, China committed $2 billion in international assistance over two years, supported the creation of a UN humanitarian hub in China, strengthened medical cooperation with developing countries, and pledged to treat its COVID-19 vaccines as a global public good. Assistance was delivered to over 150 countries and international organizations.

In the 2020s, China increasingly framed its foreign aid as part of broader South-South cooperation, maintaining that it remains the world's largest developing country. Aid efforts have been more closely aligned with the Belt and Road Initiative, which is promoted as a global public good. In addition, China has emphasized supporting the implementation of the United Nations 2030 Agenda for Sustainable Development, especially in response to global challenges such as the COVID-19 pandemic.

A 2025 study identified that domestic political considerations mattered for Chinese foreign aid, as "the regime uses foreign aid projects to help maintain domestic stability: aid projects are awarded to state-owned firms in Chinese prefectures hit by social unrest, increasing employment and future political stability."

== Comparison with ODA ==
Chinese aid, unlike the aid provided by most developed countries, is not governed by the categories of the OECD's Development Assistance Committee, and is not counted in international statistics as Official Development Assistance (ODA). Because it does not operate within the OECD framework, China does not refer to its foreign aid as ODA, instead describing it as foreign aid/assistance (duiwai yuanzhu). Rather than being a "donor", China sees itself as working within a framework of South-South cooperation:

China adheres to the principles of not imposing any political conditions, not interfering in the internal affairs of the recipient countries and fully respecting their right to independently choosing their own paths and models of development. The basic principles China upholds in providing foreign assistance are mutual respect, equality, keeping promise, mutual benefits and win-win.

— White Paper: China's Foreign Aid (2014)

The founding declaration of the Forum on China-Africa Cooperation (FOCAC) makes explicit China's critique of the dominant global mode of foreign aid, which in the Chinese view results in the mistreatment of developing countries:

Each country has the right to choose, in its course of development, its own social system, development model and way of life in light of its national conditions. . . . Moreover, the politicization of human rights conditionalities on economic assistance should be vigorously opposed to as they constitute a violation of human rights.

In contrast to Western models of aid including the OECD model, China does not condition aid on political changes or market liberalization.

As Professor Dawn C. Murphy summarizes, "From China's perspective, it is not merely offering an alternative model of foreign aid; it is directly critiquing the current system and the mistreatment of developing countries in that system." The only political commitment China requires from aid recipients is that they adhere to the One China principle; China does not otherwise require concessions on issues of governance.

China's approach to financial aid has not changed over time, but the scope of its aid has grown as its own economic development needs have increased.

As of 2017, China does not provide comprehensive data on its foreign aid. The OECD has estimated that the quantity of China's ODA-like aid in 2018 was $4.4 billion. If counted as ODA, this would have placed China tenth in the list of donor states that year, between Norway and Canada, and far behind the United States which provided $34 billion. However, China provides a much higher volume of development financing that would not qualify as ODA because it lacks a sufficient concessional element and/or is linked to commercial transactions. A 2017 study by AidData, a research lab at the College of William & Mary, found that China's ODA-like aid was effective at producing economic growth in recipient countries.

A 2023 blog post from Brookings examines the impact of Chinese foreign aid on recipient countries based on a meta-regression analysis of 1,149 estimates from 29 studies. It finds that Chinese aid has a small, heterogeneous effect on development outcomes, with a slight positive impact on economic growth, somewhat consistent with the claim that Chinese government-financed transport projects contribute to closing developing countries' infrastructure gaps, but slight negative correlations with deforestation and public perception of China. Both Chinese and OECD aid show a slight positive impact on economic outcomes, suggesting that infrastructure projects funded by both contribute to development, though the effect is small. However, Chinese aid differs in its association with negative perceptions of China and adverse environmental impacts, such as deforestation, contrasting with the more positive soft power effects and mixed environmental results of OECD aid. Neither form of aid robustly affects governance or social outcomes, and Chinese aid does not significantly influence conflict or stability, unlike some findings on Western aid. The heterogeneity in Chinese aid's impact is influenced by the type of development outcome measured, variations in aid measurement, different estimation methods, geographic regions, and author affiliations, highlighting the complexity of assessing aid effectiveness across diverse contexts.

== Administration and budget ==
The Department of Foreign Aid (established in 1982) of the Ministry of Commerce (MOFCOM) became the primary government body responsible for coordinating and disbursing foreign aid until 2018. That department was incorporated into CIDCA in 2018, and CIDCA now has the primary role in this area. According to the December 2021 Measures for the Administration of Foreign Aid, (1) CIDCA is in charge of drafting aid policies, guidelines, annual plans, and budgets; (2) MOFCOM is in charge of implementing foreign aid projects and selecting the firms to undertake them; and (3) the Ministry of Foreign Affairs makes recommendations based on diplomatic needs and its consulates and embassies supervise overseas projects.

Numerous other government bodies also have roles in administering foreign aid and development assistance. The National Development and Reform Commission coordinates handles aid on climate cooperation issues. The Ministry of Finance makes donations to multilateral financial institutions. Humanitarian assistance is led by the Ministry of Foreign Affairs. The Ministry of Education provides government scholarships. The National Health Commission coordinates China's overseas medical teams.

The Export-Import Bank of China (China Exim), a policy bank, provides foreign assistance in the form of concessional loans.

Due to the secrecy of China's aid programme details (of how much is given, to whom and for what) are difficult to ascertain.

According to the 2021 white paper China's International Development Cooperation in the New Era, between 2013 and 2018, China allocated a total of RMB 270.2 billion in foreign aid, comprising grants, interest-free loans, and concessional loans. Of this, RMB 127.8 billion (47.3%) was provided as grants, RMB 11.3 billion (4.2%) as interest-free loans, and RMB 131.1 billion (48.5%) as concessional loans.

During this period, China extended aid to 122 countries across Asia (30), Africa (53), Latin America and the Caribbean (22), Oceania (9), and Europe (8), as well as to 20 international and regional organizations.

Official discourse and Chinese academic discourse on foreign aid do not typically describe China as a donor country, instead using terminology like mutual assistance, joint development, and South-South cooperation. In China's 2011 foreign aid white paper, foreign aid is characterized as a model which adheres to equality and mutual benefit which avoids attaching political conditions on recipient countries.

A RAND published study on "China's Foreign Aid and Government Sponsored Investment" estimates the amount of both traditional aid and much more broadly defined government sponsored investment that was pledged by China in 2011 was 189.3 billion US dollars.

According to a 2017 study, described as "The most detailed study so far of Chinese aid," by AidData, between 2000 and 2014 China gave about $75 billion, and lent about $275 billion — compared to $424 billion given by America during the same period. A fifth of this Chinese aid, $75 billion, was in the form of grants (about equivalent to Britain's), while the rest was concessional lending at below-market interest rates.

In 2019, China provided approximately $5.9 billion in foreign aid.

== Forms of aid and recipients ==
Official sources divide financial aid into three categories: grants, interest free loans, and concessional loans.

Concessional loans are subsidized by China's tax revenues and therefore inexpensive for borrowers. They are provided by the Export-Import Bank of China and are used for economically productive projects and large-scale infrastructure, with interest rates below domestic benchmarks and the difference subsidized by the state. As of 2009, China had offered such loans to 76 countries, funding 325 projects, primarily in transport, communications, and energy sectors.

Grants are primarily used to support small and medium-sized social welfare projects, such as schools, hospitals, low-cost housing, and water supply systems, as well as for technical cooperation, human resource development, and humanitarian aid. Interest-free loans are typically allocated to infrastructure and livelihood projects in developing countries with stable economic conditions, often with 20-year terms, including grace and repayment periods.

Deborah Bräutigam identifies nine types of aid from China including "medical teams, training and scholarships, humanitarian aid, youth volunteers, debt relief, budget support, turn-key or 'complete plant' projects [infrastructure, factories], aid-in-kind and technical assistance."

Grants or non-interest loans have funded 2,025 complete infrastructure project, from the start of aid efforts up to 2009, in the categories of farming, water distribution, conference buildings, education facilities, power supply, transport, industrial facilities, and other projects. Perhaps the famous type of project is a football stadium, which has been referred to as stadium diplomacy. A similar type of project that receives attention is the construction of theatres and opera houses.

China's infrastructure lending has increased the level of policy autonomy that the developing countries it lends to have at the World Bank. For example, a study by academic Diego Hernandez finds that countries which received loans from China had 15% conditions for every percentage point increase in Chinese development finance.

By 2019, China had provided more capital to emerging market and developing countries than all Western development institutions combined.

=== Examples ===
==== Africa ====
The most significant Chinese developmental aid project in Africa was the TAZARA railway connecting the copper mines of Zambia with ports in Tanzania, built in the early 1970s to circumvent white-minority ruled Rhodesia and South Africa. The Friendship Port of Nouakchott, an artificial deepwater port in the capital of Mauritania was completed in 1986. It was the second largest foreign aid project China had undertaken.

A report by AidData found that as of 2014 the majority of Chinese official development assistance went to Africa. The greatest recipients of Chinese aid in sub-Saharan Africa are, in descending order, Côte d'Ivoire, Ethiopia, Zimbabwe, Cameroon, Tanzania, Ghana, Mozambique, and Republic of Congo.

In December 2015, at the Forum on China-Africa Cooperation (FOCAC) summit in Johannesburg, Chinese leader Xi Jinping announced a package of "Ten Cooperation Plans" to be implemented over three years. These included support for industrialization, agricultural modernization, infrastructure, financial cooperation, green development, trade and investment facilitation, poverty reduction, public health, cultural exchanges, and peace and security.

In September 2018, during the FOCAC Beijing summit, China launched the "Eight Major Initiatives" to be carried out in the subsequent three years and beyond. These focused on industrial development, infrastructure connectivity, trade facilitation, green growth, capacity building, health, civilian exchanges, and security cooperation.

In June 2020, at the Extraordinary China-Africa Summit on Solidarity Against COVID-19, China reaffirmed its commitment to support African countries' pandemic response and pledged to prioritize cooperation in public health, economic recovery, and improving livelihoods. The summit emphasized building a closer China-Africa community with a shared future.

In response to health crises such as Ebola, yellow fever, Zika virus, and plague, China provided emergency humanitarian aid to affected countries. Following the Ebola outbreak in West Africa, China delivered five rounds of assistance totaling $120 million to 13 African countries, deployed nearly 1,200 medical personnel and public health experts, and supported the treatment and testing of thousands of cases. China also constructed laboratories and treatment centers, including a hospital in Liberia completed in just over 20 days. The China-Sierra Leone laboratory was later designated as a national reference lab and biosafety training center by the Sierra Leonean government.

In August 2022, the Ministry of Foreign Affairs of the People's Republic of China announced that it would forgive 23 interest-free loans that matured at the end of 2021 to 17 unspecified African countries.

==== Asia ====
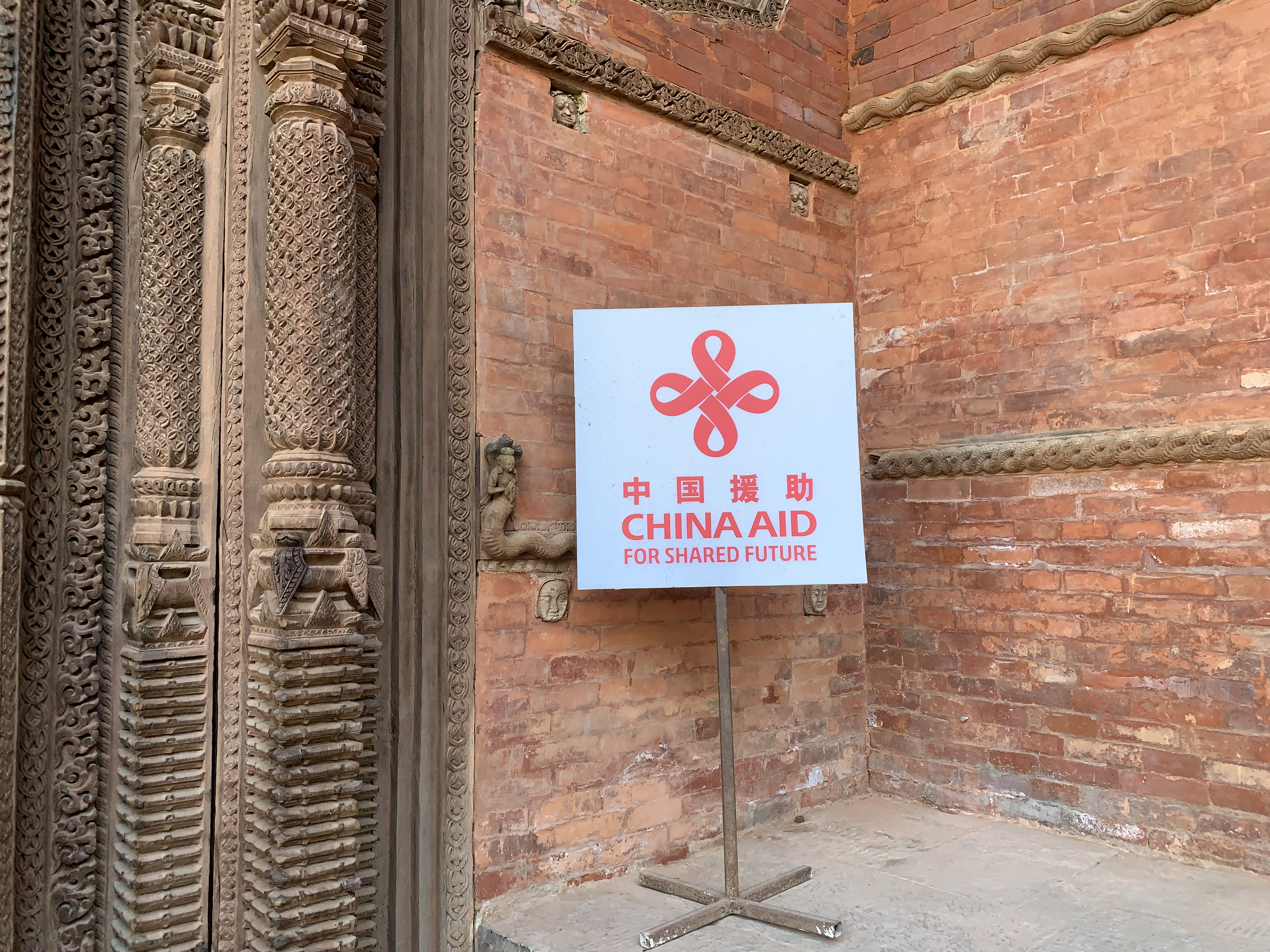
"CHINA AIDS FOR SHARED FUTURE" sign at Hanuman Dhoka, Kathmandu, Nepal (2023)

In December 2005, China donated $20 million to the Asian Development Bank for a regional poverty alleviation fund; it was China's first such fund set up at an international institution.

China's financial assistance for infrastructure development has significantly increased supply capacity in south Asia, particularly among the smaller south Asian countries, beginning in the mid-2000s. Nepal benefitted from increased Chinese aid, including Chinese financing for a railway from Kathmandu to Lhasa. China has been an important foreign aid contributor to Sri Lanka since the end of the Sri Lankan Civil War in 2009. In Bangladesh, Chinese foreign aid has also become increasingly important. China has built six major "friendship bridges" in Bangladesh, among other projects. Because China has trade surpluses with these countries, its providing of foreign aid is viewed by the smaller south Asian countries as a means of insuring their respective bilateral relationships with China are mutually beneficial.

From the 1970s up to 2022 China has reportedly implemented more than 100 aid projects in Pacific Island countries.

From 2000 to 2014, Cambodia received 132 projects financed by Chinese aid, a greater number of projects than any other recipient of Chinese aid.

China's role in the Armenian economy has been a major force for growth and development. Since the early 2000s, China has become Armenia's largest foreign donor, providing over $2 billion in foreign aid between 2000 and 2017.

== See also ==
- List of development aid agencies
- List of development aid country donors
- Foreign aid to China
- Belt and Road Initiative
- Foreign policy of China
