= History of foreign relations of China =

Foreign Relations of China

The history of foreign relations of China is the history of China's relations with other states.

For the history of foreign relations of China before 1800, see Foreign relations of imperial China. During the 19th century, the Qing dynasty faced increasing pressure from Western powers and Japan, resulting in the Opium Wars, the imposition of unequal treaties, and the weakening of Chinese sovereignty. Chinese foreign policy focused largely on resisting foreign encroachment and preserving territorial integrity.

In the early 20th century, Chinese foreign relations became increasingly shaped by nationalism, anti-imperialism, and efforts to reunify and modernize the country. Following the May Fourth Movement in 1919, both the Kuomintang and the Chinese Communist Party sought to end foreign domination while competing for control of China. The Second Sino-Japanese War brought China into the wider conflict of the Second World War and significantly altered its international position.

After the establishment of the People's Republic of China in 1949, China aligned closely with the Soviet Union before the Sino-Soviet split reshaped relations within the communist bloc during the 1960s. During the Cold War, China supported anti-colonial and revolutionary movements across Asia, Africa, and Latin America while seeking recognition as a major power. In 1971, the United Nations recognized the People's Republic of China as the representative government of China, replacing the Republic of China.

Under Deng Xiaoping, the Reform and opening up policies initiated in the late 1970s expanded China's engagement with the global economy and contributed to its emergence as a major economic power. Since the early 21st century, China has pursued a more assertive foreign policy through military modernization, expanded international initiatives including the Belt and Road Initiative, and increased competition with the United States.

== Qing Dynasty ==
By the mid 19th century, Chinese stability had come under increasing threat from both domestic and international sources. Social unrest and serious revolts became more common while the regular army was too weak to deal with foreign military forces. Chinese leaders increasingly feared the impact of Western ideas. John King Fairbank argued that from 1840 to 1895 China's response to the worsening relations with Western nations came in four phases. China's military weakness was interpreted in the 1840s and 1850s as a need for Western arms. Very little was achieved in this regard until the 1860s. Since the 1860s the Self-Strengthening Movement started and there was a focus on acquiring Western technology, similar to Japan. The 1870s to 1890s were characterized with efforts to reform and revitalize the Chinese political system more broadly. There was steady moderate progress, but efforts to leap forward such as the Hundred Days' Reform in 1898 roused the conservatives who stamped out the effort and executed its leaders. There was a rise in Chinese nationalism which led to a quick defeat in war with Japan in 1895. An intense reaction against modernization set in at the grassroots level in the Boxer Rebellion of 1900.

== Opium Wars ==
European commercial interests sought to end the trading barriers, but China fended off repeated efforts by Britain to reform the trading system. Increasing sales of Indian opium to China by British traders led to the First Opium War (1839–1842). The superiority of Western militaries and military technology like steamboats and Congreve rockets forced China to open trade with the West on Western terms.

The Second Opium War, also known as the Arrow War, (1856–60) saw a joint Anglo-French military mission including Great Britain and the French Empire win an easy victory. The agreements of the Convention of Peking led to the ceding of Kowloon Peninsula as part of Hong Kong.

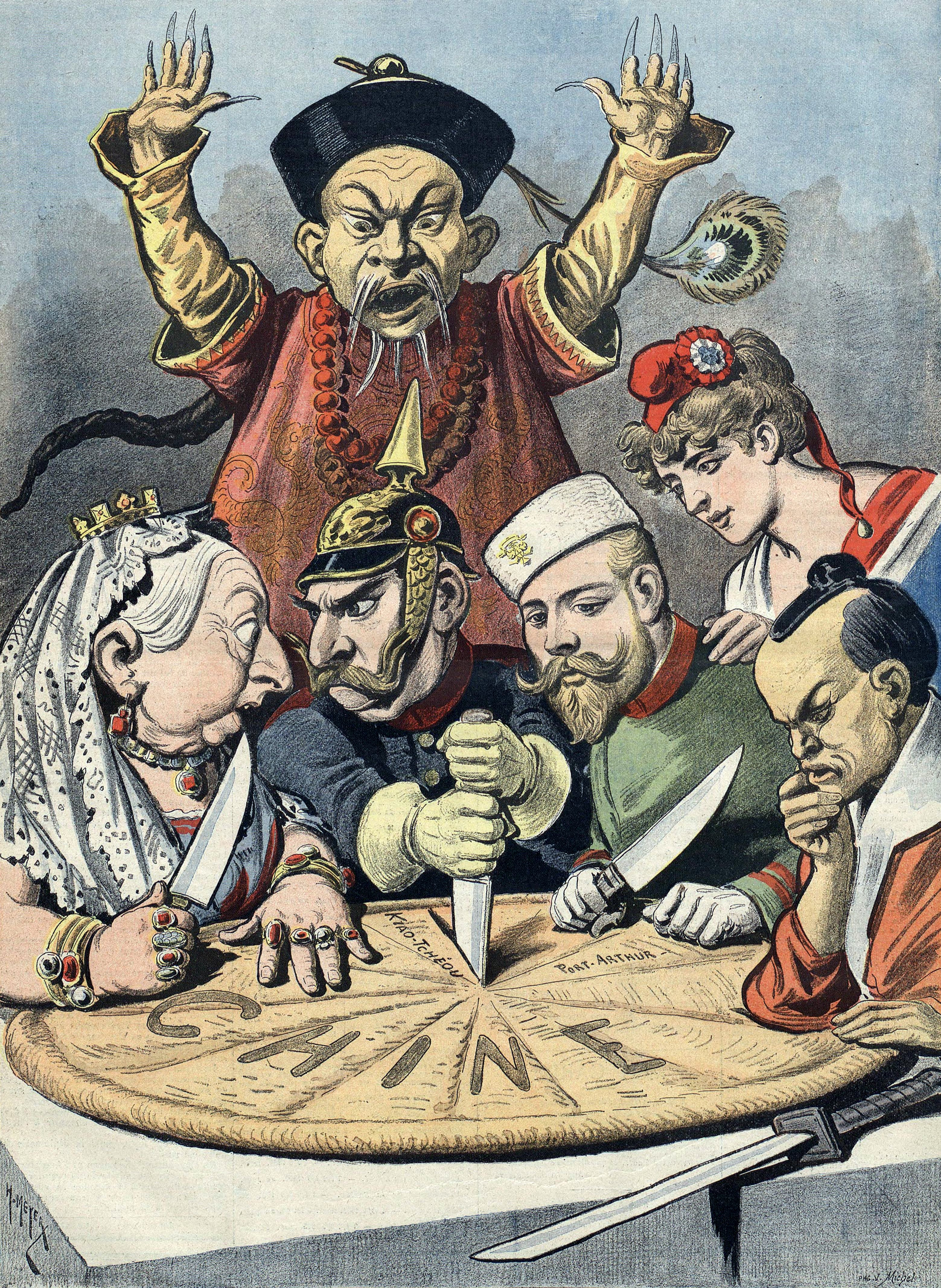
French political cartoon from 1898 depicts helpless China being carved up and divided among the great powers: Britain, Germany, Russia, France and Japan.

=== Unequal treaties ===
A series of "unequal treaties", including the Treaty of Nanking (1842), the treaties of Tianjin (1858), and the Beijing Conventions (1860), forced China to open new treaty ports, including Canton (Guangzhou), Amoy (Xiamen), and Shanghai. The treaties also allowed the British Empire to set up Hong Kong as a Crown colony and established international settlements in the treaty ports under the control of foreign diplomats. China was required to accept diplomats at the capital in Peking, provided for the free movement for foreign ships in Chinese rivers, kept its tariffs low, and opened the interior to Christian missionaries. Manchu leaders of the Qing government found the treaties useful, because they forced the foreigners into a few limited areas, so that the vast majority of Chinese had no contact whatsoever with them or their ideas. The missionaries, however, ventured more widely but were widely distrusted and made very few converts. Their main impact was setting up schools and hospitals. Since the 1920s, the "unequal treaties" have been a centerpiece of Chinese grievances against the West in general.

=== Suzerainty and tributaries ===
For centuries China had claimed suzerain authority over numerous adjacent areas. The areas had internal autonomy but were forced to give tribute to China while being theoretically under the protection of China in terms of foreign affairs. By the 19th century the relationships were nominal, and China exerted little or no actual control. The great powers did not recognize this system and gradually seized the supposed suzerain areas. Japan moved to dominate the Korean Empire (and annexed it in 1910) and seized the Ryukyu Islands; France took Vietnam; Britain took Burma and Nepal; Russia took parts of Siberia. Tibet was nominally left, but the Younghusband expedition and subsequent Qing attempt to reassert control led to the region's de facto independence in 1912.

China lost wars with Japan and gave up nominal control over the Ryukyu Islands in 1870 to Japan. After the Sino-French War of 1884–1885, France took control of Vietnam, another tributary state. After Britain took over Burma, as a show of good faith they maintained the sending of tribute to China, putting themselves in a lower status than in their previous relations. To affirm this, Britain agreed in the Burma convention in 1886 to continue the Burmese payments to China every 10 years, in return for which China would recognise Britain's occupation of Upper Burma. After the First Sino-Japanese War of 1894 it lost Formosa to Japan.

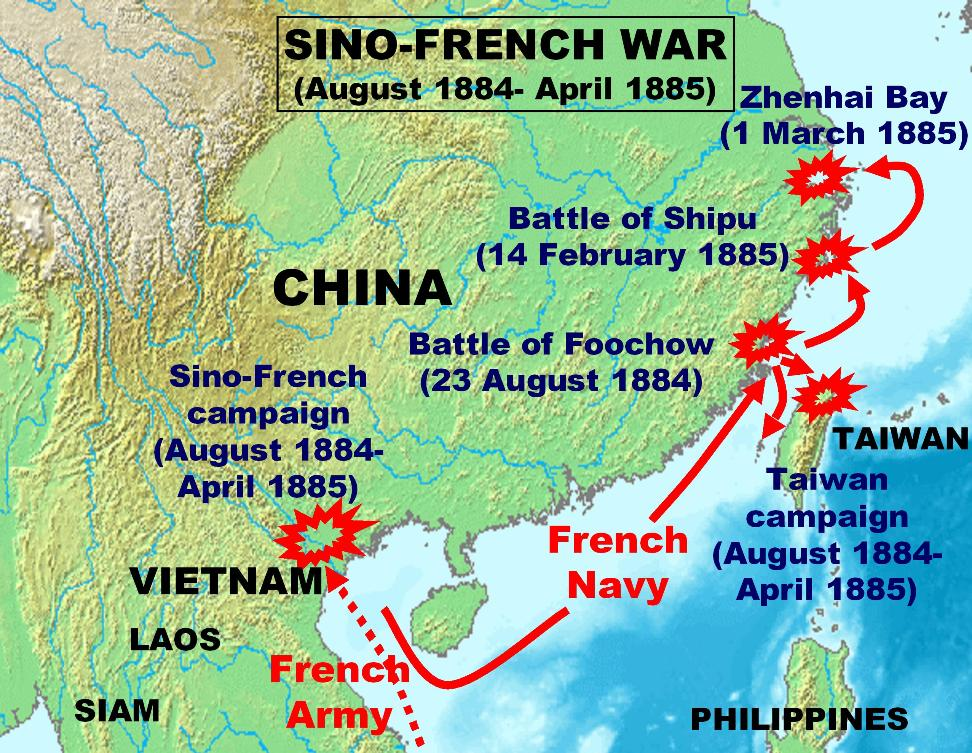
Sino-French War (1884–1885)

Manchuria was a contested zone between Russia and Japan, taking control away from China and in the process going to war themselves in 1904.

=== Christian missionaries ===
Catholic missions began with the Jesuit China missions from France and Italy in the 16th century. For a while they were highly successful in placing intellectuals and scientists in the royal court. The Pope, however, prohibited the priests from making accommodations for Confucianism or paganism. The Jesuits left, but returned in 1842. Converts were from the lower social strata, and numbered about 240,000 in 1840 and 720,000 in 1901. The Jesuits opened Aurora University in Shanghai in 1903 to reach an elite audience. German missionaries arrived in the late 19th century, and Americans arrived in the 1920s, largely to replace the French.

Protestant missionaries started to come, including thousands of men, their wives and children, and unmarried female missionaries. These were sponsored and financed by organized churches in their home countries. At first they were limited to the Canton area. In the 1842 treaty ending the First Opium War missionaries were granted the right to live and work in five coastal cities. In 1860, the treaties ending the Second Opium War opened up the entire country to missionary activity. Protestant missionary activity surged during the next few decades. From 50 missionaries in China in 1860, the number grew to 2,500 (counting wives and children) in 1900. 1,400 of the missionaries were British, 1,000 were Americans, and 100 were from Continental Europe, mostly Scandinavia. Protestant missionary activity peaked in the 1920s and thereafter declined due to war and unrest in China, as well as a sense of frustration among the missionaries themselves. By 1953, all Protestant missionaries had been expelled by the communist government of China.

In the long-term, the major impact of the missions was the introducing modern medical standards, and especially building schools for the few families eager to learn about the outside world. The hospitals both cured sick people and taught hygiene and care of children. These hospitals lessened the hostility of Chinese officials. The key leader of the 1911 Revolution, Sun Yat-sen, spent four years in exile in Hawaii, where he studied in Christian schools and eventually converted.

When missionaries returned home they typically preached a highly favorable view toward China, and a negative view toward Japan, helping promote public opinion in the West that increasingly supported China. At the local level across China, missionaries were the only foreigners the vast majority of the population ever saw. Outside the protected international centers, they came under frequent verbal attack, and sometimes violent episodes. This led the international community to threaten military action to protect missionaries, as their diplomats demanded the government provide more and more protection. Attacks reached a height during the Boxer Rebellion, which had a major anti-missionary component. The Boxers killed over 200 foreign missionaries and thousands of Chinese Christians, including Dr. Eleanor Chesnut, who was killed by a mob in 1905. Likewise nationalist movements in the 1920s and 1930s also had an anti-missionary component.

== First Sino-Japanese War (1894–1895) ==
After 1860, Japan modernized its military after Western models and was far stronger than China. The war, fought in 1894 and 1895, was fought to resolve the issue of control over Korea, which was yet another suzerain claimed by China and under the rule of the Joseon Dynasty. A peasant rebellion led to a request by the Korean government for China to send in troops to stabilize the country. The Empire of Japan responded by sending its own force to Korea and installing a puppet government in Seoul. China objected and war ensued. Japanese ground troops routed Chinese forces on the Liaodong Peninsula and nearly destroyed the Chinese navy in the Battle of the Yalu River.

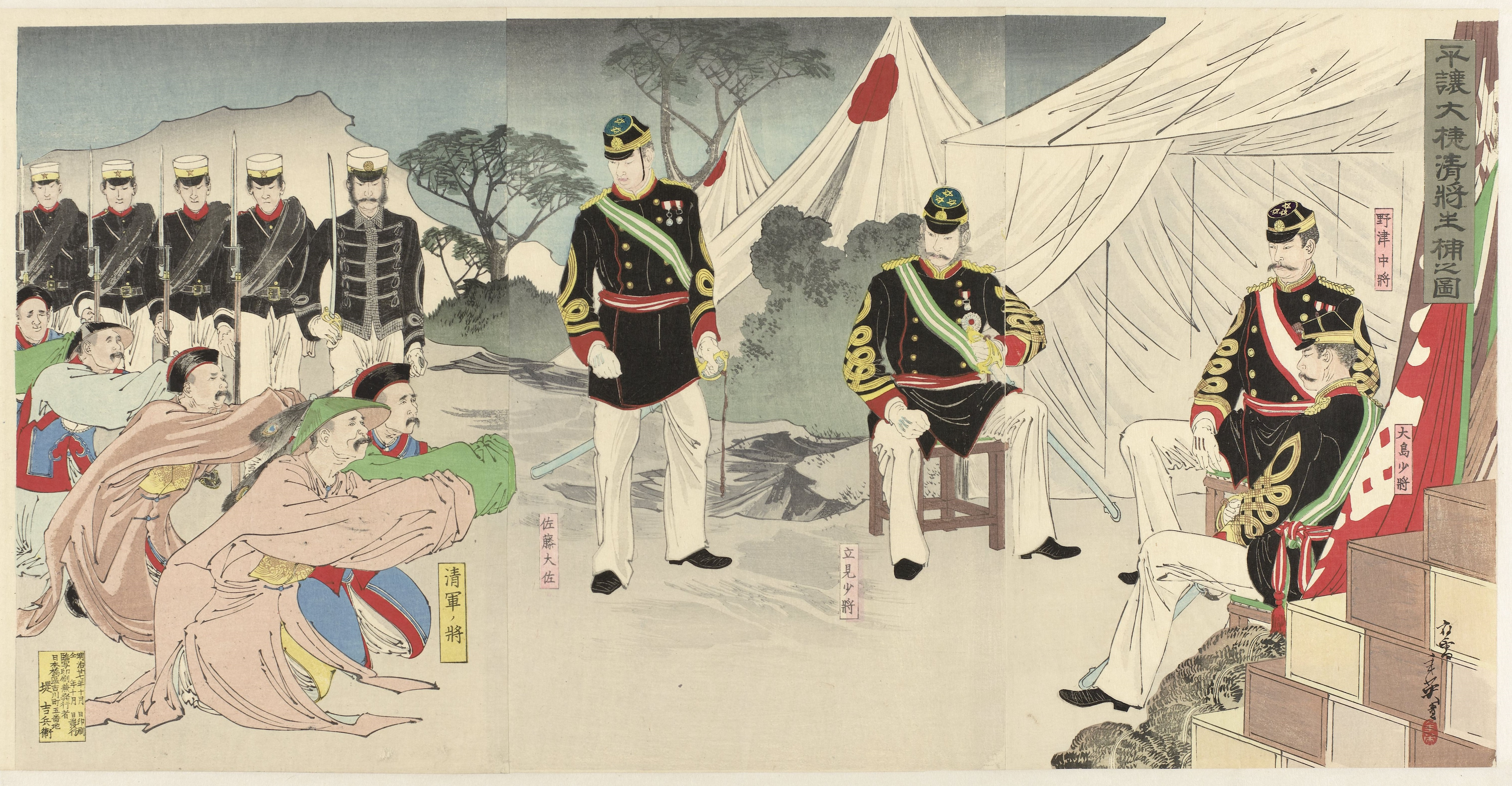
Chinese generals in Pyongyang surrender to the Japanese, October 1894.

=== Treaty of Shimonoseki ===
China, badly defeated, sued for peace and was forced to accept the harsh Treaty of Shimonoseki Signed on April 17, 1895. China became responsible for a financial indemnity of £30 million. It had to surrender to Japan the island of Taiwan and the Pescatore Islands. Japan received most favored nation status, like all the other powers and Korea became nominally independent, although the Empire of Japan and the Russian Empire were vying for control. The most controversial provision ceded the Liaodong Peninsula to Japan. However this was not acceptable to Russia, which took the self-appointed mantle of protector of China and worked with Germany and France to intervene and forced Japan to withdraw from the Liaodong Peninsula. To pay the indemnities, British, French and Russian banks loaned China the money, but they also gained other advantages. Russia in 1896 was given permission to extend its Trans-Siberian Railway across Manchuria to reach Vladivostok, a 350-mile shortcut. The new Chinese Eastern Railway was controlled by the Russians, and became a major military factor for them in controlling key parts of Manchuria. Later in 1896 Russia and China made a secret alliance, whereby Russia would work to prevent further Japanese expansion into China. In 1898 Russia obtained a 25-year lease over the Liadong Peninsula in southern Manchuria, including the ice free harbor of Port Arthur, their only such facility in the East. An extension of the Chinese Eastern Railway to Port Arthur greatly expanded Russian military capabilities in the Far East.

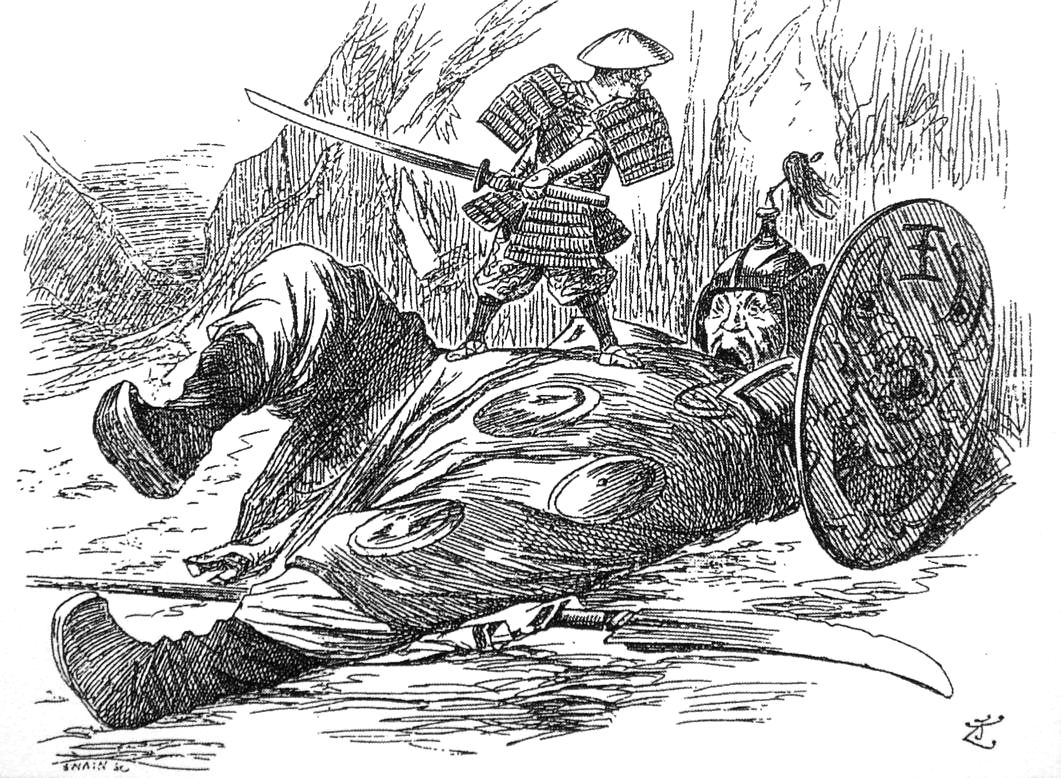
British cartoon shows the victory of "little" Japan over "large" China. in 1894.

== Reforms in 1890s ==
One of the government's main sources of income was a five percent tariff on imports. The government hired Robert Hart (1835–1911), a British diplomat, to run it from 1863. He set up an efficient system based in Canton that was largely free of corruption, and expanded it to other ports. The top echelon of the service was recruited from all the nations trading with China. Hart promoted numerous modernising programs, including a modern postal service and supervision of internal taxes on trade. Hart helped establish Chinese embassies in foreign countries. He helped set up the Tongwen Guan (School of Combined Learning) in Peking, with a branch in Canton, to teach foreign languages, culture and science. In 1902 the Tongwen Guan was absorbed into the Imperial University, now Peking University.

=== Hundred Days Reform ===
The Hundred Days Reform was a failed 103-day national, cultural, political, and educational reform movement from 11 June to 22 September 1898. It was undertaken by the young Guangxu Emperor and his reform-minded supporters. Following the issuing of over 100 reformative edicts, a coup d'état ("The Coup of 1898", Wuxu Coup) was perpetrated by powerful conservative opponents led by Empress Dowager Cixi (1835–1908). The Emperor was locked up until his death and key reformers were exiled or fled.

Empress Dowager Cixi was in control of imperial policy after 1861; she had remarkable political skills but historians consider her to be responsible for major policy failures and the growing weakness of China. Her reversal of reforms in 1898 and especially support for the Boxers caused all the powers to join against her. Late Qing China remains a symbol of national humiliation and weakness in Chinese and international historiography. Scholars attribute Cixi's "rule behind the curtains" responsible for the ultimate decline of the Qing dynasty and its capitulatory peace with foreign powers. Her failures hastened the revolution to overthrow the dynasty.

==== Boxer rebellion ====
The Boxer Rebellion (1897–1901) was an anti-foreigner movement by the Righteous Harmony Society in China between 1897 and 1901. They attacked and often killed missionaries, Christian converts, and foreigners. They held the international diplomats in Peking under siege. The ruler of China, the Dowager Empress Cixi, supported the Boxers. The uprising was crushed by the ad hoc Eight Nation Alliance of major powers. On top of all the damage, China was forced to pay annual installments of an indemnity of $333 million American dollars to all the victors. Actual total payments amounted to about $250 million. Robert Hart, the inspector general of the Imperial Maritime Customs Service, was the chief negotiator for the peace terms. The indemnity, despite some beneficial programs, was "nothing but bad" for China, as Hart had predicted at the beginning of the negotiations.

== Republican China ==
The Republican Revolution of 1911 overthrew the imperial court and brought an era of confused politics. Yuan Shikai became president in 1912 and, with support from regional war lords, tried to declare himself Emperor in 1915. He showed little interest in foreign affairs apart from obtaining loans from Europe. When he suddenly died in 1916 the national government was left in chaos.

When World War I broke out in 1914, China officially entered the war and played a small role. Japan seized the German possessions in China. In January 1915 Japan issued the Twenty-One Demands. The goal was to greatly extend Japanese control of Manchuria and of the Chinese economy. The Chinese public responded with a spontaneous nationwide boycott of Japanese goods; Japan's exports to China fell by forty percent. Britain was officially a military ally of Japan but was affronted and no longer trusted Japan. With the British focused on the Western Front against Germany, Japan's position was strong. Nevertheless, Britain and the United States forced Japan to drop the fifth set of demands that would have given Japan a large measure of control over the entire Chinese economy and ended the Open Door Policy. Japan and China reached a series of agreements which ratified the first four sets of goals on 25 May 1915. Japan gained a little at the expense of China, but Britain refused to renew the alliance and American opinion turned hostile. The Paris Peace Conference in 1919 resulted in the Versailles Treaty that allowed Japan to retain territories in Shandong that had been surrendered by Germany in 1914. Chinese students launched the May Fourth Movement in 1919, inspiring a nationwide nationalistic hostility against Japan and the other foreign powers.

After 1916 almost all of China was in the hands of regional warlords. Until 1929 the Nationalist government was a small rump establishment based in Beijing, with little or no control over most of China. However, it did control foreign affairs, and was recognized by foreign countries. It received the customs revenue; the money was largely used to pay off old debts, such as the indemnities for the Boxer Rebellion. It managed to negotiate an increase in the customs revenue, and represented China in international affairs such as the Paris peace conference. It tried with limited success to renegotiate the unequal treaties. Britain and the other powers continued to control Shanghai and the other port cities until the late 1920s.

In 1931, Japan seized control of Manchuria over the objections of the League of Nations. Japan quit the League, which was unable to respond. The most active Chinese diplomat was Wellington Koo.

In 1938, Chiang Kai-Shek's Ministry of Foreign Affairs published a "Map of National Shame" which listed Mongolia, parts of Siberia, and Indochina as "lost territories."

By 1943, The ROC government participated in the Moscow Conference, the Dumbarton Oaks Conference, and the United Nations Conference on International Organization and was a charter member of the United Nations after participating in the alliance that won World War II.

=== German role ===
The German military had a major role in Republican China. The Imperial German Navy was in charge of Germany's Jiaozhou Bay Leased Territory, and spent heavily to set up modern facilities that would be a showcase for Asia. Japan seized the German operations in 1914 after sharp battles. After World War I, the Weimar Republic provided extensive advisory services to the Republic of China, especially training for the Chinese army. Colonel General Hans von Seeckt, the former commander the German army, organized the training of China's elite National Revolutionary Army units and the fight against communists in 1933–1935. All military academies had German officers, as did most army units. In addition, German engineers provided expertise and bankers provided loans for China's railroad system.

Trade with Germany flourished in the 1920s, with Germany as China's largest supplier of government credit. The last major advisor left in 1938, after Nazi Germany had allied itself with Japan. Nevertheless, Chiang Kai-Shek continued to use Germany as a model for the nation, as his mentor Sun Yat-sen had recommended.

== Second Sino-Japanese War (1937–1945) ==
Japan invaded in 1937, launching the Second Sino-Japanese War. By 1938, the United States was a strong supporter of China. Michael Schaller says that during 1938:

China emerged as something of a symbol of American-sponsored resistance to Japanese aggression.... A new policy appeared, one predicated on the maintenance of a pro-American China which might be a bulwark against Japan. The United States hoped to use China as the weapon with which to contain Tokyo's larger imperialism. Economic assistance, Washington hoped, could achieve this result.

Chiang Kai-shek with U.S. President Franklin D. Roosevelt and British Prime Minister Winston Churchill at the Cairo Conference in 1943

Even the isolationists who opposed war in Europe supported a hard-line against Japan. American public sympathy for the Chinese, and hatred of Japan, was aroused by reports from missionaries, novelists such as Pearl Buck, and Time Magazine of Japanese brutality in China, including reports surrounding the Nanjing Massacre, called the 'Rape of Nanking'. By early 1941, the U.S. was preparing to send American planes flown by American pilots under American command, but wearing Chinese uniforms, to fight the Japanese invaders and even to bomb Japanese cities. There were delays and the "Flying Tigers" under Claire Lee Chennault finally became operational days after the attack on Pearl Harbor (December 7, 1941) brought the U.S. into the war officially. The Flying Tigers were soon incorporated into the United States Army Air Force, which made operations in China a high priority, and generated enormous favorable publicity for China in the U.S.

After Japan occupied Southeast Asia, American aid had to be routed through British India and over the Himalayan Mountains at enormous expense and delay. Chiang's beleaguered government was now headquartered in Chongqing. Roosevelt sent Joseph Stilwell to train Chinese troops and coordinate military strategy. He became the Chief of Staff to Generalissimo Chiang Kai-shek, served as U.S. commander in the China Burma India Theater, was responsible for all Lend-Lease supplies going to China, and was later Deputy Commander of South East Asia Command. Despite his status and position in China, he became involved in conflicts with other senior Allied officers over the distribution of Lend-Lease materiel, Chinese political sectarianism and proposals to incorporate Chinese and U.S. forces in the 11th Army Group (which was under British command). Chiang Kai-shek's wife Soong Mei-ling, who had been educated in the U.S., addressed the U.S. Congress and toured the country to rally support for China. Congress amended the Chinese Exclusion Act and Roosevelt moved to end the unequal treaties. Chiang and Soong met with Roosevelt and Churchill at the Cairo Conference of late 1943, but promises of major increases in aid did not materialize.

The perception grew that Chiang's government, with poorly equipped and ill-fed troops, was unable to effectively fight the Japanese or that he preferred to focus more on defeating the CCP. China Hands advising Stilwell argued that it was in American interest to establish communication with the Communists to prepare for a land-based counteroffensive invasion of Japan. The Dixie Mission, which began in 1943, was the first official American contact with the Communists. Other Americans, led by Chennault, argued for air power.

In 1944, Generalissimo Chiang acceded to Roosevelt's request that an American general take charge of all forces in the area, but demanded that Stilwell be recalled. General Albert Coady Wedemeyer replaced Stilwell, Patrick J. Hurley became ambassador, and Chinese-American relations became much smoother. The U.S. had included China in top-level diplomacy in the hope that large masses of Chinese troops would defeat Japan with minimal American casualties. When that hope was seen as illusory, and it was clear that B-29 bombers could not operate effectively from China, it became less important to Washington, but was promised a seat in the new UN Security Council, with veto power.

== Civil War ==
When civil war threatened, President Harry S. Truman sent General George Marshall to China at the end of 1945 to broker a compromise between the Nationalist government and the Communists, who had established control in much of northern China. Marshall hoped for a coalition government, and brought the two distrustful sides together. At home, many Americans saw China as a bulwark against the spread of communism, but some Americans hoped that the Communists would remain on friendly terms with the United States. CCP chairman Mao Zedong had long admired the U.S.—George Washington was a hero to him—and saw it as an ally in the Second World War. He was bitterly disappointed when the U.S. would not abandon the Nationalists, writing that "the imperialists who had always been hostile to the Chinese people will not change overnight to treat us on an equal level." His official policy was "wiping out the control of the imperialists in China completely." Truman and Marshall, while supplying military aid and advice, determined that American intervention could not save the Nationalist cause. One recent scholar argues that the Communists won the Civil War because Mao Zedong made fewer military mistakes and Chiang Kai-shek antagonized key interest groups. Furthermore, his armies had been weakened in the war against Japanese. Meanwhile, the Communists promised to improve the ways of life for groups such as farmers.

Soviet leader Joseph Stalin's policy was opportunistic and utilitarian. He offered official Soviet support only when the People's Liberation Army had virtually won the Civil War. Sergey Radchenko argues that "all the talk of proletarian internationalism in the Sino-Soviet alliance was but a cloak for Soviet expansionist ambitions in East Asia".

== People's Republic of China ==
Countries of the world indicating decade diplomatic relations commenced with the People's Republic of China: 1949/1950s (dark red), 1960s (red), 1970s (orange), 1980s (beige), 1990s/2000s (yellow) and 2010s/2020s (green). Countries not recognized by or not recognizing the PRC are in grey.

=== International recognition ===
Since its establishment in 1949, the People's Republic of China has worked vigorously to win international recognition and support for its position that it is the sole legitimate government of all China, including Tibet, Hong Kong, Macau, (Taiwan), the Senkaku/Diaoyu islands and islands in the South China Sea.

The early PRC operated under the principle of "cleaning the house before inviting guests," meaning that it would seek to "clean up" colonial influences before it sought recognition from states that it deemed as Western imperialists.

Upon its establishment in 1949, the People's Republic of China was recognized by Eastern Bloc countries. On 4 January 1950, Pakistan became the first Muslim country to recognize China. Among the first Western countries to recognize China were the United Kingdom (6 January 1950), Switzerland (17 January 1950) and Sweden (14 February 1950). The first Western country to establish diplomatic ties with China was Sweden (on 9 May 1950). Until the early 1970s, the Republic of China government in Taipei was recognized diplomatically by most world powers and held China's permanent seat in the UN Security Council, including its associated veto power. After the Beijing government assumed the China seat in 1971 (and the ROC government was expelled), the great majority of nations have switched diplomatic relations from the Republic of China to the People's Republic of China. Japan established diplomatic relations with the PRC in 1972, following the Joint Communiqué of the Government of Japan and the Government of the People's Republic of China, and the U.S. did so in 1979. In 2011, the number of countries that had established diplomatic relations with Beijing had risen to 171, while 23 maintained diplomatic relations with the Republic of China (or Taiwan). (See also: Political status of Taiwan).

=== People's diplomacy ===
Soon after its founding, the People's Republic of China institutionalized its view of people's diplomacy (renmin waijiao). People's diplomacy was expressed through the slogan, "influence the policy through the people." Pursuant to its people's diplomacy, China sent doctors, scientists, and athletes to developing countries in Asia to cultivate ties. This form of people's diplomacy was often executed through the communist party's International Liaison Department. People's diplomacy with the capitalist countries sought to cultivate informal, non-state ties in the hope of developing "foreign friends" who would lobby their governments to improve relations with China.

== Mao-era foreign policies ==
During the Mao era, China's foreign relations were rooted in Chinese leadership's perceptions of the international socialist movement's purpose. In their view, the primary concern of worldwide revolutionary activities should be anti-imperialism, and the economic development brought by socialism would result in a shift in the global balance of power.

Articles 54 and 56 of the Common Program stated that China's foreign relations would be based on respect for mutual sovereignty.

The terminology of "the Cold War" was not prominent in Chinese discourse during the Mao era. From the dominant Chinese view, the conflict between capitalism and socialism that existed from the late 1940s into the 1970s had not gone "cold."

In the 1947–1962 era, Mao emphasized the desire for international partnerships, on the one hand to more rapidly develop the economy, and on the other to protect against attacks, especially by the U.S. His numerous alliances, however, all fell apart, including the Soviet Union, North Vietnam, North Korea, and Albania. He was unable to organize an anti-American coalition. Furthermore, Mao was insensitive to the fears of alliance partners that China was so big, and so inwardly directed, that their needs would be ignored.

During the Mao era, China's foreign policy bureaucracy was small. Strategic decisions and security issues were handled in a top-down style. With Mao in overall control and making final decisions, Chinese Premier Zhou Enlai handled foreign-policy and developed a strong reputation for his diplomatic and negotiating skills. Zhou stressed discipline in the diplomatic corps, maintaining that "there is no small matter in diplomacy." Despite his diplomatic skills, Zhou's bargaining position was undercut by the domestic turmoil initiated by Mao.

The 1954 Geneva Conference, which sought to resolve issues from the Korean War and the Indochina War, was the PRC's first significant involvement in an international diplomatic event.

The Bandung Conference in 1955, at which Zhou led the Chinese delegation, was an important milestone for China's foreign relations. China developed its foreign relations with many newly independent and soon-to-be independent countries, including making the PRC's first contact with the Arab countries. China termed this cooperative approach the "Bandung Line." This was the beginning of China's official discourse of South-South cooperation. China's Five Principles of Peaceful Coexistence were incorporated into the Ten Principles of Bandung.

In 1971, China began expressing its view of international solidarity through the concept of "Chairman Mao's Revolutionary Diplomatic Line" (Mao zhuxi geming waijiao luxian). The concept included both efforts to engage with the peoples of Asia, Africa, and Latin America in opposition to imperialism, as well as China's view of solidarity with workers and oppressed peoples in the capitalist and imperialist countries. The idea largely reflected the principles developed at the Bandung Conference, but added an ideological framing for engaging with capitalist countries by distinguishing "the people" of these countries from the policies of their governments, which China continued to criticize.

China announced its Three Worlds Theory at the United Nations in 1974. China's focus on the Third World portrayed as the legitimate leader of the global battle against imperialism and capitalism. It urged Third World countries not to side with either the United States or the Soviet Union, viewing both of those count as coveting hegemony over the Third World. Mao described Africa and Latin America as the "First Intermediate Zone," in which China's status as a non-white power might enable it to compete with and supersede both United States and Soviet Union influence.

=== With the Middle Eastern countries ===
China's relations in the Middle East from the founding of the PRC until 1978 were shaped significantly by China's ideological stance. China emphasized its own semi-colonial history in an effort to build solidarity with the liberation movements in the Middle East. The Arab Liberation movements regarded China as a reliable and strong ally and China viewed the newly independent Middle Eastern countries as "friends standing on the same front".

From the 1950s through the 1970s, more than half the Middle Eastern countries established diplomatic relations with the PRC. In 1971, China established relations with the Middle Eastern countries it had previously deemed as reactionary, such as Kuwait, Iran, and Lebanon. When the United Nations admitted the PRC to the China seat in 1971, more than a third of the PRC's votes came from the Middle East. As part of its diplomatic commitments to the Arab countries, during this period China did not establish relations with Israel and favored the Arab positions on issues relating to the Arab-Israeli conflict.

== Soviet Union and Korean War ==
After its founding, the PRC's foreign policy initially focused on its solidarity with the Soviet Union, the Eastern Bloc nations, and other communist countries, sealed with, among other agreements, the Sino-Soviet Treaty of Friendship, Alliance and Mutual Assistance signed in 1950 to oppose China's chief antagonists, the West and in particular the U.S. The 1950–53 Korean War waged by China and its North Korea ally against the U.S., South Korea, and United Nations (UN) forces has long been a reason for bitter feelings. After the conclusion of the Korean War, China sought to balance its identification as a member of the Soviet bloc by establishing friendly relations with Pakistan and other Third World countries, particularly in Southeast Asia.

China's entry into the Korean War was the first of many "preemptive counterattacks". Chinese leaders decided to intervene when they saw their North Korean ally being overwhelmed and no guarantee American forces would stop at the Yalu River.

=== Break with Moscow ===
By the late 1950s, relations between China and the Soviet Union had become so divisive that in 1960, the Soviets unilaterally withdrew their advisers from China. The two then began to vie for allegiances among the developing world, for China saw itself as a natural champion through its role in the Non-Aligned Movement and its numerous bilateral and bi-party ties. In the 1960s, Beijing competed with Moscow for political influence among communist parties and in the developing world generally. In 1962, China had a brief war with India over a border dispute. By 1969, relations with Moscow were so tense that fighting erupted along their common border. Following the Warsaw Pact invasion of Czechoslovakia and clashes in 1969 on the Sino-Soviet border, Chinese competition with the Soviet Union increasingly reflected concern over China's own strategic position. China then lessened its anti-Western rhetoric and began developing formal diplomatic relations with West European nations.

In a March 22, 1969 meeting on the Sino-Soviet border clashes, Mao stated that in foreign relations, China was "now isolated" and "we need to relax a little". Later that year, China began to restore its embassies, which had been disrupted by the Cultural Revolution, to normal functioning.

== 1970s and 1980s ==
In October 1971, the United Nations expelled the Republic of China and admitted the People's Republic of China as the government of China. Between 1971 and 1972, twenty-five countries began diplomatic recognition of the PRC.

A visit by Japanese Prime Minister Kakuei Tanaka to Beijing culminated in the signing of a joint statement on September 29, 1972, and normalization of diplomatic relations between Japan and the PRC. Japan stated that it was aware of its responsibility for causing enormous damage to the Chinese people during World War II and China renounced its demand for war reparation from Japan. Avoiding political disputes over this traumatic history facilitated immediate strategic cooperation. The Japanese agreed with the Chinese view on the political status of Taiwan, namely "that Taiwan is an inalienable part of the territory of the People's Republic of China."

In the 1970s and 1980s, China sought to create a secure regional and global environment for itself and foster good relations with countries that could aid its economic development. During the time of Mao, China was a closed country. After his death, authorities led by Deng Xiaoping began initiating reforms. Along with Deng's policy of reform and opening up, Deng involved more parties in foreign policy decision-making, decentralizing the foreign policy bureaucracy. Deng's approach attempted to build broad consensus and required enormous efforts to achieve compromises acceptable to all relevant stakeholders on an issue. This decentralized approach led to consideration of a great number of interests and views, but also fragmentation of policy institutions and extensive bargaining between different bureaucratic units during the policy-making process.

Deng described anti-hegemonism as one of China's foreign policy priorities and emphasized that China should follow the Five Principles of Peaceful Coexistence in managing its foreign relations with countries that were organized according to different political beliefs and social systems. During the late 1970s and the 1980s, Deng's use of anti-hegemonism generally referred to the Soviet Union. Deng sought to improve relations with the United States, although it also criticized hegemonic actions of the country. While improving ties with the West, China continued to closely follow the political and economic positions of the Third World Non-Aligned Movement, although China was not a formal member.

China grew concerned about the strong Soviet influence in Vietnam, fearing that Vietnam could become a pseudo-protectorate of the Soviet Union. Vietnam's claim to be the world's third largest military power following its victory in the Vietnam War also increased Chinese apprehensions. In the Chinese view, Vietnam was pursuing a regional hegemonic policy in an attempt to control Indochina. On 25 December 1978, Vietnam invaded Democratic Kampuchea, overrunning most of the country, deposing the Khmer Rouge regime favored by China, and installing Heng Samrin as the head of the new Cambodian government. The move antagonized China, which now viewed the Soviet Union as capable of encircling its southern border. China launched an invasion of Vietnam in the Sino-Vietnamese war. On Match 6, 1979, China declared that its punitive mission had been achieved and withdrew.

Chinese anxiety about Soviet strategic advances was heightened following the Soviet Union's December 1979 invasion of Afghanistan. Sharp differences between China and the Soviet Union persisted over Soviet support for Vietnam's continued occupation of Cambodia, the Soviet invasion of Afghanistan, and Soviet troops along the Sino-Soviet border and in Mongolia—the so-called "three obstacles" to improved Sino-Soviet relations.

In 1983, 74-year-old Li Xiannian became President of China, nominal state representative of China under military leader Deng Xiaoping and one of the longest serving politicians in the leadership of China. He visited many countries and thus began opening China to the world. In 1985, Li Xiannian was the first president of China to visit the U.S. President Li also visited North Korea. 1986 saw the arrival of Queen Elizabeth II in an official visit. To this end, China looked to the West for assistance with its modernization drive and for help in countering Soviet expansionism, which it characterized as the greatest threat to its national security and to world peace.

Since the 1980s, China's foreign policy has been peace-seeking with a focus on optimizing mutual economic interests between states. It has generally sought to maintain good relationships with countries that may be opposed to each other, for example in its cultivation of relationships with both Israel and the Arab states. During the 1980s, Deng began formulating a good neighboring policy to capitalize on regional activism. Under this policy, China no longer considered a neighboring country's ideological tendencies as a critical factor in foreign policy, and instead focused on developing international relationships with its neighbors regardless of their respective ties to the United States or the Soviet Union. Thus, in 1988, China signed an agreement with Mongolia regarding borders, despite the fact that China's government had long viewed neighboring Mongolia as a Soviet satellite.

=== 1989 Tiananmen Square protests and massacre ===
In the immediate aftermath of the 1989 Tiananmen Square protests and massacre, various countries imposed sanctions, cancelled aid, banned sales of military equipment, or cut back diplomatic ties. In response to these efforts to isolate China, Deng articulated the "twenty-four character guidelines" for China to adopt in its international affairs: observe carefully (冷静观察), secure China's positions (稳住阵脚), calmly cope with the challenges (沉着应付), hide China's capacities and bide its time (韬光养晦), be good at maintaining a low profile (善于守拙), and never claim leadership (绝不当头). China's approach focused on learning to live with the fact of United States hegemony.

Although the crackdown hurt relations with Western countries, it had relatively little impact on China's relations with its Asian neighbors. Most of these neighboring countries did not have better human rights records than China and were generally sympathetic to China in light of the pressure it received from Western countries. Even in the wake of the crackdown, China's foreign relations with its neighbors generally improved.

== 1990s ==
In the 1990s, China adopted conservative negotiating tactics in its territorial disputes, deemphasizing the use of confrontation and instead relying on legal agreements and diplomatic measures.

Following the dissolution of the Soviet Union in late 1991, China also opened diplomatic relations with the republics of the former Soviet Union. In the post-Cold War environment, CCP general secretary Jiang Zemin continued Deng's good neighboring policy, under the principles of stabilizing the periphery, expanding diplomacy, and altering the situation. China had considered the Soviet Union its principal security threat, and its dissolution reduced the importance of security considerations in China's perceptions of South and Central Asian geo-politics. China began rebuilding relations with its Central Asian countries, with their economic ties growing during the 1990s and subsequently.

Beginning in 1992, China began to balance its relationships with North and South Korea. It normalized its diplomatic relations with South Korea in 1992 while continuing its strategic relationship with North Korea.

To combat the threat of militant Islam-fueled separatism in Xinjiang and to cement relations with the Central Asian states following the Soviet Union's dissolution, China signed the 1996 Treaty of Enhancing Military Mutual Trust in the Border Areas with nearby Kazakhstan, Tajikistan, Russia, and Kyrgyzstan at a meeting in Shanghai. The group of nations began meeting in 1997 as the "Shanghai Five" (and continuing into the 2000s as the Shanghai Cooperation Organisation).

China increased its reputation among its neighbors during the 1997 Asian financial crisis. Other Asian countries harshly affected by the crisis sought the United States or Japan to bail them out of the difficult economic conditions. As the United States and Japan moved slowly, China made a highly regarded symbolic gesture by refusing to devalue its own currency (which presumably would have touched off a series of competitive devaluations with serious consequences for the region). Instead, China contributed $4 billion to neighboring countries via a combination of bilateral bailouts and contributing to IMF bailout packages. In 1999, as a result of these actions, the World Bank described China as a "source of stability for the region" in one of its reports.

Beginning in the late 1990s, China began to articulate its new security concept: that no single state, even the most powerful, is capable of coping with all security challenges alone.

=== Relations with the United States in the 1990s ===
The 1990s presented several challenges in China-United States relations, although there were positive developments for China including the United States' de-linking of China's most favored nation status from its human rights record. In July 1993, the Yinhe incident prompted Jiang's adoption of the "sixteen-characters formula" for working with the United States: "enhancing confidence, reducing troubles, expanding cooperation, and avoiding confrontation." During the Yinhe incident, the United States Navy stopped a Chinese container ship, the Yinhe, based on incorrect suspicions that the ship contained chemical weapon precursors bound for Iran. Although China denied the allegation, the United States unilaterally cut off the Yinhe's GPS, causing it to lose direction and forcing it to anchor on the high seas for twenty-four days. The Yinhe ultimately agreed to an inspection which found no chemical weapon precursors. Despite China's request for a formal apology, the United States refused to apologize and refused to pay compensation. Despite the humiliation of the Yinhe incident, Jiang adopted a posture of diplomatic good will to the United States, including the sixteen-characters formula.

Tensions also followed the United States bombing of the Chinese embassy in Belgrade on May 7, 1999, which the United States claimed occurred by mistake. The bombing created outrage among Chinese people, who did not accept the United States claim that the bombing was accidental. For several days, Beijing was rocked by massive anti-US demonstrations. Deeming the importance of the bilateral relationship too great to be harmed by the embassy bombing, CCP general secretary Jiang Zemin sought to calm the Chinese public outrage.

== 21st century ==
Since its founding in 2000, the Forum on China-Africa Cooperation (FOCAC) is the primary multi-lateral coordination mechanism between China and the African states. Chinese foreign aid is a significant area of interaction within FOCAC. Through FOCAC, China provides aid in the forms of debt forgiveness, aid grants, concessional loans, and interest-free loans.

In 2001, China, Russia, Kazakhstan, Tajikistan, Kyrgyzstan, and Uzbekistan began regular meetings under the auspices of the Shanghai Cooperation Organisation. China takes a leadership role in the organization, which focuses on defeating the "three evils" of separatism, terrorism, and extremism.

China was active in the Six-Party talks in an effort to end North Korea's nuclear program in the early 2000s. China hoped to play a lead role in developing the Six-Party Talks into a lasting multilateral security mechanism for northeast Asia, but ultimately the talks failed. China's efforts in the unsuccessful tasks nonetheless raised its international standing.

Founded in 2004, the China-Arab States Cooperation Forum (CASCF) serves as the major multi-lateral cooperation mechanism between China and the Arab League states.

In 2008, China revised its policies towards pariah states, articulating a new view that it was willing to condition its diplomatic protection of pariah countries, forcing them to become more acceptable to the international community.

Under general secretaryship of Xi Jinping, China has adopted a new foreign policy doctrine called "Major Country Diplomacy" (Chinese: 大国外交) which has replaced the earlier Deng Xiaoping era slogan of "keep a low profile" (Chinese: 韬光养晦) and has legitimized a more active role for China on the world stage, particularly with regards to reform of the international order, engaging in open ideological competition with the West, and assuming a greater responsibility for global affairs in accordance with China's rising power and status. During the first five years of Chinese Communist Party general secretary Xi Jinping’s leadership the budget for diplomacy doubled.

The aggressive style of Chinese diplomacy which emerged in the 21st century has been termed “Wolf Warrior Diplomacy." The phrase is derived from the patriotic Chinese movie Wolf Warrior and its sequel Wolf Warrior 2, the film's tagline was "Even though a thousand miles away, anyone who affronts China will pay." Efforts aimed at incorporating Chinese diaspora into China's foreign policy have also intensified with an emphasis placed on ethnic loyalty over national loyalty.

During the COVID-19 pandemic, Xi kept an extensive schedule of phone and video foreign meetings as part of his "cloud diplomacy" (云外交), which received prominent attention in Chinese media, similar to in-person foreign visits.

China has been criticized for its aggressive diplomatic response to the COVID-19 outbreak which included spreading misinformation about how other countries were handling the outbreak.

=== Social media ===
Engagement on social media sites such as Facebook and Twitter has become an integral component of Chinese diplomacy. From April 2019 to April 2020 the output of Chinese diplomat's Twitter accounts increased fourfold.

== See also ==
- International relations (1814–1919)
  - Diplomatic history of World War I
  - International relations (1919–1939)
  - Diplomatic history of World War II
  - Cold War
- China–United States relations
- History of Sino-Russian relations
- Ten Major Relationships, Mao's policy speech of 1956
- Foreign relations of China
  - Foreign relations of Imperial China
  - Foreign relations of Hong Kong
  - Foreign relations of Macao
  - Foreign relations of Taiwan
