= Old friends of the Chinese people =

Diplomatic term used by Chinese authorities

- Simplified Chinese: 中国人民的老朋友
- Traditional Chinese: 中國人民的老朋友
Transcriptions
Standard Mandarin
- Hanyu Pinyin: Zhōngguó rénmín de lǎo péngyǒu

Old friends of the Chinese people (simplified Chinese: 中国人民的老朋友; traditional Chinese: 中國人民的老朋友), or Chinese people's old friends, is a special Chinese diplomatic term used by the Chinese Communist Party and the Chinese government and its main leaders to describe international friends who made contributions to China's construction. From 1949 to 2010, 601 foreigners, from 123 countries on five continents, were referred to as the "old friends" in the People's Daily. Among the first was James Gareth Endicott, a Canadian clergyman who supported the Chinese Communist Revolution. The first time the Chinese Communist Party publicly used "old friend of the Chinese people" was in 1956 when the term appeared in the People’s Daily to describe Endicott.

The number of nationalities of foreign friends described as "old friends of the Chinese people" has increased from 9 in the 1950s and 1960s to 24 in the 1990s, and again to 29 in the 21st century.

With the changes in China's foreign policy, the "old friends of the Chinese people" in different eras also point to different groups. The first batch of "old friends", represented by Edgar Snow and Ma Haide, were foreigners who had visited Yan'an during the Second Sino-Japanese War and assisted the Chinese Communist Revolution. The second batch of "old friends", represented by Norodom Sihanouk, were the leaders of the Third World and Eastern Bloc who had supported each other internationally after the establishment of the People's Republic of China in 1949. The third batch of "old friends", represented by Henry Kissinger and Richard Nixon, were the private individuals and foreign dignitaries who had contributed to the normalization of China's diplomacy in the 1970s. During a July 2023 meeting with Kissinger in Beijing, General Secretary of the Chinese Communist Party Xi Jinping said, “The Chinese people never forget their old friends, and Sino-U.S. relations will always be linked with the name of Henry Kissinger.” The fourth batch of "old friends", represented by George H. W. Bush and Jacques Chirac, are those who, after China's reform and opening up, have helped China to integrate into the world order and stand on the international stage.

In his foreign policy discourse, Xi Jinping cites the examples of "foreign friends of China" to acknowledge other countries' sacrifices to assist in China's national liberation, particularly with regard to the Second Sino-Japanese war. For example, during diplomatic visits to other countries, Xi has praised the contributions of people like Claire Lee Chennault, Norman Bethune, Dawarkanath Kotnis, and Soviet pilots.

== See also ==
- Hurting the feelings of the Chinese people
- International Department of the Chinese Communist Party
- State Administration of Foreign Experts Affairs
