= Trade policy of China =

Exports of China by product category (2019) Chemical products Transportation Machines Mineral products Plastics and rubbers Metals Foodstuffs Precious metals Textiles Instruments Animal products Vegetable products Paper goods Footwear and headwear Miscellaneous Stone and glass Wood products Animal and vegetable bi-products Animal hides Arts and antiques Weapons

China is the world's largest exporter, a position it has maintained continuously since 2010. It is the largest trading partner of over 120 countries, as of at least early 2024. As a member of the Regional Comprehensive Economic Partnership (RCEP), China is part of the world's largest trading bloc.

China began promoting overseas investment through the "Go Out policy", which General Secretary of the Chinese Communist Party Jiang Zemin formally announced as a national strategy in 2000. After its 2001 entry into the World Trade Organization (WTO), China focused on export-led growth and became a major link in global supply chains. Through this process, China developed large trade surpluses and foreign currency reserves.

== History ==
China resumed status as a member of the General Agreement on Tariffs and Trade (GATT) in 1987.

During Jiang Zemin's tenure, China adopted policies to expand foreign trade and economic relations with other countries through the Maritime Commerce Law (1993), Anti-Subsidy Rules (1997), and 2001 revisions to the Foreign Investment Law. In addition to Jiang, top officials like Zhu Rongji also prioritized integrating China more deeply into the global trading system.

In 1999, the Chinese Communist Party (CCP) began promoting investment abroad through the Go Out policy and CCP General Secretary Jiang Zemin formally announced it as a national strategy in March 2000. The policy was implemented top-down from central government leadership. During Jiang's tenure, the policy greatly expanded China's investment and influence in global South countries, especially those in Africa and Asia.

After its entry into the World Trade Organization (WTO) in 2001, China began pursuing export-led growth and became a key link in global supply chains. China formed the policy-based insurer Sinosure to support the exports and overseas business of domestic companies. Chinese businesses were encouraged to trade directly with foreign companies (instead of working through SOEs as previously). with the exception of certain state monopoly sectors deemed critical to national security. China's industrious and cheap labor also proved attractive to foreign investments. China's share of the global trade surplus increased rapidly after it joined the WTO. The country accumulated large trade surpluses and foreign currency reserves, which greatly increased government resources.

In 2016, China joined the Transports Internationaux Routiers Convention (TIR Convention), a multilateral treaty reducing administrative boundaries for international transportations of goods in customs-sealed containers. The majority of TIR members also participate in China's Belt and Road Initiative and membership significantly facilitates China's trade.

China is a member of the Regional Comprehensive Economic Partnership (RCEP). RCEP is the first trade agreement to include all three of China, Japan, and South Korea. In January 2022, RCEP became the world's largest trade bloc (in economic terms) and continues to be the world's largest as of at least early 2024.

China provides foreign aid to advance both foreign trade objectives and foreign policy objectives. Since the 2018 creation of the China International Development Cooperation Agency to coordinate aid, China has placed a lesser emphasis on aid to advance foreign trade and a greater emphasis on aid to advance foreign policy.

In 2020, China signed major free trade agreements with the European Union as well as fifteen different Asia-Pacific countries. As of at least 2023, China is the world's largest exporter, a status it has maintained continuously since 2010.

Effective 1 December 2024, China eliminated tariffs for goods imported from all of the countries that the United Nations categorizes as least developed and with which China has diplomatic relations. Thirty-three of the countries benefiting from the agreement are in Africa and the non-African countries receiving zero tariff treatment are Yemen, Kiribati, the Solomon Islands, Afghanistan, Bangladesh, Cambodia, Laos, Myanmar, Nepal, and East Timor.

== Impact ==
As of at least early 2024, China is the largest trading partner of over 120 countries. Given the scale of China and its economy, the country's impact on international trade flow is major. As of at least 2024, the global current account surplus is largely composed of China, Europe, and the Middle East.

== See also ==
- Economy of China
- Economic history of China 1949-present
- History of trade of the People's Republic of China
- China and the World Trade Organization
