= Foreign aid to China =

Overview of aid

Foreign aid to China since 1949 has taken the form of both bilateral and multilateral official development assistance (ODA) and other official aid. According to World Bank and OECD data, China’s net ODA received is negative, reflecting that it gives more than it receives.

== History ==
Japan's Official Development Assistance to China began in 1979, following China's initiation of economic reforms and the 1978 Treaty of Peace and Friendship between the two nations. The program consisted of three main components: yen loans (the largest element), grant aid, and technical cooperation, with the first round including six major infrastructure projects totaling 28.06 billion yen in loans plus 680 million yen in grants for projects such as the China-Japan Friendship Hospital. The aid program developed through four distinct periods, reaching its peak in the late 1980s when Prime Minister Takeshita Noboru visited China with a third round of yen loans totaling 810 billion yen for 42 construction projects, nearly doubling the previous amount. Japan's approach shifted in the 1990s with the introduction of its 1992 ODA Charter, which emphasized democratization and environmental protection as aid criteria, leading to tensions with Chinese leadership who rejected political conditions on economic assistance. The yen loan component officially ended in 2007, coinciding with the 2008 Beijing Olympics, after providing over 3 trillion yen in concessional loans with 20-40 year repayment terms over nearly three decades.

Since 1979, the World Food Programme operated a 25-year, nearly US$1 billion food aid program in China, providing grain and other assistance that reached more than 30 million people in poor rural regions. The program supported food-for-work schemes that built infrastructure such as roads, irrigation systems, and drinking water facilities, before officially concluding in 2005 as China transitioned from aid recipient to donor.

Up to the late 1990s and early 2000s, China was still a significant aid recipient. In 2001 China received approximately US$1.4 billion in foreign aid (about US$1.10 per capita), down from US$2.4 billion in 1999 (US$1.90 per capita). Some of this aid came through the United Nations system: the PRC received about US$113 million annually in UN assistance in 2001 and 2002, with the largest portion from the UNDP.

In the 2020s, China receives limited targeted aid from multilateral agencies and some bilateral partners, mainly for health, environment, and technical cooperation projects. During the COVID-19 pandemic, China briefly accepted international donations of medical supplies in early 2020. In fiscal year 2023, total U.S. foreign aid to China amounted to about US$12.2 million, mostly for health, environment, and governance programs. The largest single U.S. grant that year was to Creative Associates International for US$3.8 million.

== See also ==
- Foreign aid program of China
