= List of ambassadors of China to Albania =

The ambassador of China to Albania is the official representative of the People's Republic of China to the Republic of Albania.

== List of representatives ==
- September 1954 – May 1957: Xu Yixin
- June 1957 – July 1964: Luo Shigao
- September 1964 – January 1967: Xu Jianguo
- April–September 1967: Liu Xiao
- May 1969 – January 1971: Geng Biao
- February 1971 – May 1976: Liu Zhenhua
- September 1976 – May 1979: Liu Xinquan
- April 1979 – June 1983: Wen Ning
- September 1983 – July 1986: Xi Zhaoming
- September 1986 – October 1989: Fan Chengzuo
- November 1989 – November 1992: Gu Maoxuan
- May 1993 – February 1996: Tao Miaofa
- March 1996 – October 1999: Ma Weimao
- November 1999 – November 2001: Zuo Furong
- December 2001 – September 2007: Tian Changchun
- November 2007 – November 2011: Wang Junling
- December 2011 – March 2015: Ye Hao
- March 2015 – 2019: Jiang Yu
- May 2026: Pang Chunxue

== See also ==
- List of ambassadors of Albania to China
- Albanian–Chinese split
