= Hardial Bains =

Canadian communist leader (1939–1997)

- Bains in 1979

First Secretary of the Communist Party of Canada (Marxist–Leninist)
- In office 1970–1997
- Succeeded by: Sandra Smith

Personal details
- Born: 15 August 1939 Chak 6, Punjab, British India
- Died: 24 August 1997 (aged 58) Hull, Quebec, Canada
- Party: Communist Party of Canada (Marxist–Leninist)
- Spouse: Sandra L. Smith
- Education: University of British Columbia
- Profession: Lecturer of microbiology

Hardial Bains (15 August 1939 – 24 August 1997) was a Canadian communist leader who founded a number of leftist organizations, foremost of which was the Communist Party of Canada (Marxist–Leninist) (CPC(M-L)). Presenting himself as an anti-revisionist Marxist–Leninist until his death, Bains acted as the spokesperson and ideological leader of the CPC(M-L), known in elections as the Marxist–Leninist Party of Canada. During his lifetime, Bains's outlook was initially heavily influenced by Maoism until the Sino-Albanian split, where he then became closely aligned with Hoxhaism and the government of the People's Socialist Republic of Albania. Shortly before he died, while never having reneged on his anti-revisionist stance, Bains shifted his focus to issues of the "democratic renewal" of the Canadian electoral system. This perspective was shaped within the context of the Charlottetown Accord Referendum and Bains' perception of the "retreat of revolution" after the collapse of the Eastern Bloc states by the early 1990s. Spending most of his life in Canada, Bains was also politically active in England, Ireland, United States, and India. Initially, he was a lecturer of microbiology by profession.

== Biography ==
Bains was born in British-ruled India (in what is now Pakistan) to a communist Sikh family in the Punjab. Bains' family later moved to their ancestral village Mahilpur, India after the 1947 Partition of India. In India he became a member of the youth wing of the Communist Party of India (CPI). He was dismayed by what he saw as the revisionism of Nikita Khrushchev following the death of Joseph Stalin. He broke with the party when the CPI, during an underground period, supported Khrushchev's criticisms of Stalin. Shortly after, Bains immigrated to Canada and enrolled as a graduate student in microbiology at the University of British Columbia (UBC) from 1960 to 1965, where he was an elected student leader.

In 1963, he helped found "The Internationalists", which evolved from a UBC political discussion group into an anti-revisionist student organization influenced by Mao Zedong Thought. The Internationalists became the basis of CPC(M-L) with Bains as its founding leader.

In 1965, Bains founded the "Internationalists in Ireland", while he was working as a lecturer in microbiology at Trinity College, Dublin. In 1970, they renamed themselves the Communist Party of Ireland (Marxist–Leninist).

In 1967, Bains held a small conference of students in London with the express objective determining the future of the anti-revisionist movement, the "Necessity for Change" conference. While the Irish Communist Organisation disagreed with the other delegates and walked out of the meeting, Bains became known as a leader of the anti-revisionist movement internationally, and assisted in establishing Marxist–Leninist parties around the world.

In addition to founding the CPC(M-L) and CPI(ML), Bains is regarded as a major influence on the Revolutionary Communist Party of Britain (Marxist–Leninist), the Communist Party of Trinidad and Tobago, and the Communist Ghadar Party of India. Bains was also responsible for the founding of the Hindustani Ghadar Party (Organisation of Indian Marxist–Leninists Abroad). He held a leading influence in the Marxist–Leninist Party, USA in the 1970s, although it later split from the CPC(M-L) and dissolved in 1993. Some remnants of the MLP USA loyal to Bains formed the US Marxist–Leninist Organization in the 1980s. Left publications such as Modern Communism have written articles on his legacy.

=== Political affiliations ===
As a young man, Bains was a member of the Communist Party of India, but after the party accepted Nikita Khrushchev's speech, "On the Cult of Personality and Its Consequences", he apparently quit, adopting a pro-Stalinist viewpoint.

Later, following the Sino-Soviet split, Bains' groups and parties held a strident Maoist position from the 1960s and into the 1970s. This was in line with the broader New Communist Movement, which until 1976 universally viewed Mao Zedong as the primary alternative to the deemed revisionism of the USSR. CPC(M-L) was the first significant Maoist organization in Canada, although it was eventually joined by two other Maoist groups, In Struggle!, and Workers' Communist Party, in the mid-1970s. Each of the groups actively hostile to each other. Both In Struggle! and the Workers' Communist Party parties had collapsed by the early 1980s, leaving CPC(M-L) alone as the only major self-identified anti-revisionist party in Canada.

With Mao Zedong's death in 1976 and the subsequent Sino-Albanian split, Bains renounced Maoism. Following the leadership of Enver Hoxha and the Party of Labour of Albania (PLA), he became a prominent advocate of the PLA's line internationally, agreeing with the conclusion that Albania stood alone as the only socialist state in the world, with China, the Soviet Union, and all other self-identified socialist states falling into revisionism.

After the overturn of socialism in Albania, Bains again re-appraised his ideological outlook. He visited Cuba and announced he had changed his outlook towards the country and now viewed it as an example of socialism. The CPC(M-L) also re-appraised its view of North Korea into a positive light. By the end of his life, Bains' writings made fewer and fewer references to anti-revisionism, and developed the theme of democratic renewal and the self-empowerment of the people due to the perceived "world-wide retreat of revolution".

=== Death and legacy ===
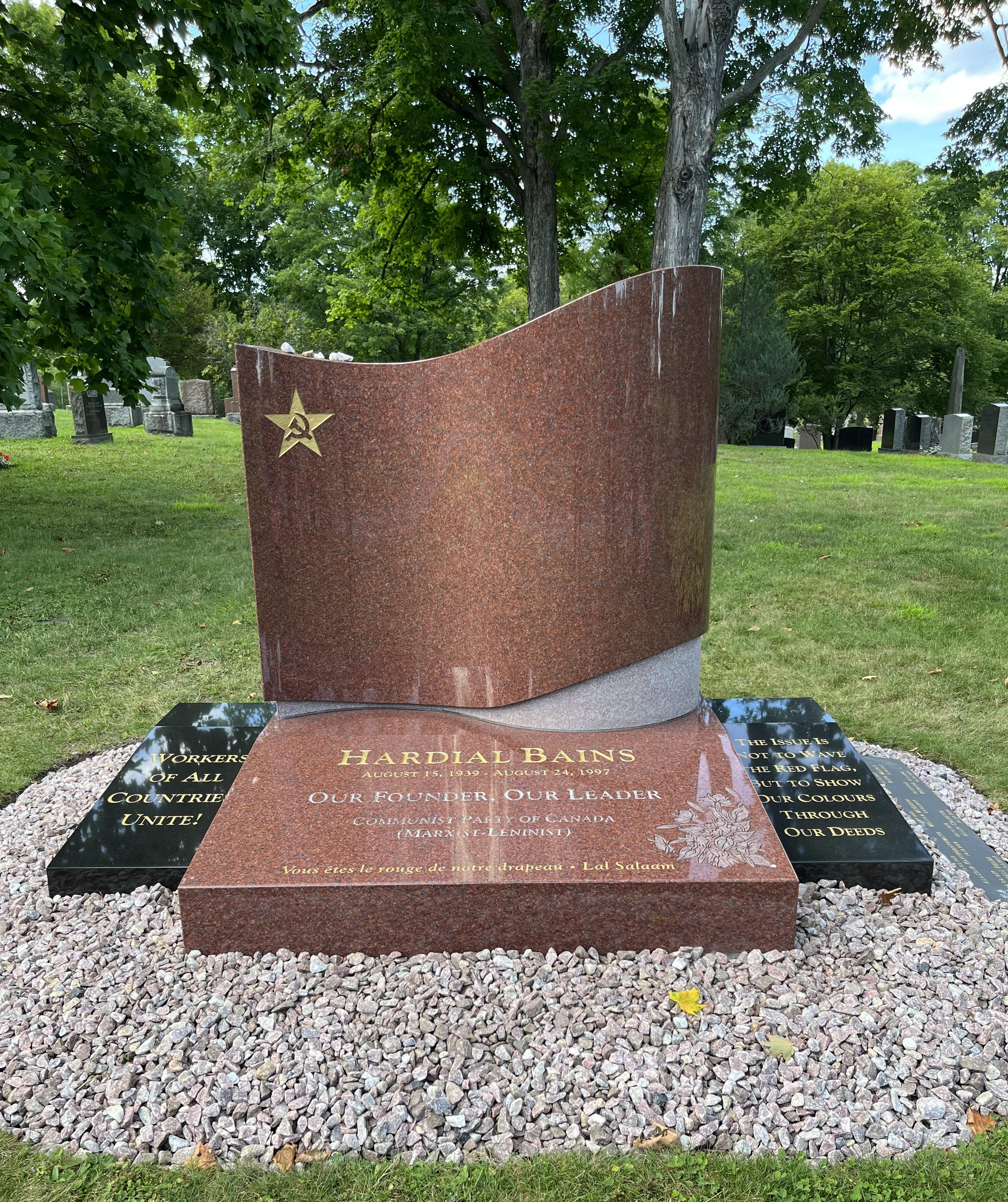
Bains's memorial in Beechwood Cemetery

Bains died after a prolonged battle with cancer in Hull, Quebec, on August 24, 1997.

After his death, a memorial was erected in honour of Bains and other CPC(M-L) "fallen comrades" in Ottawa's Beechwood Cemetery. Poet George Elliot Clarke published a poem titled "Homage to Hardial Bains" in 2000 in the Oyster Boy Review.

Bains wrote several books, including Necessity for Change!, Modern Communism, Visiting Cuba, If You Love Your Class and Thinking About the Sixties, as well as many articles, pamphlets and speeches.

Sandra L. Smith, his widow, also served as leader of the CPC(M-L).

== Publications ==
- Hardial Bains. The Question is Really One of Word and Deed (pamphlet), Progressive Cultural Association, 1997. ISBN 978-0-9530083-0-8.
- Hardial Bains. The Call of the Martyrs: On the Crisis in India and the Present Situation in the Punjab. National Publications Centre, 1985. ISBN 978-0-88803-133-4.
- Hardial Bains. Modern Communism (pamphlet), Communist Party of Canada (Marxist–Leninist), reprinted 1996. ISBN 0-920410-03-0, ISBN 978-0-920410-03-5.
- Hardial Bains. Communism 1989-1991, Ideological Studies Centre, 1991.
- Hardial Bains. Necessity for Change! The Dialectic Lives! (pamphlet), The Internationalists, 1967. Reprinted by Communist Party of Canada (Marxist–Leninist), 1998.
