= Communist Party of Canada (Marxist–Leninist) =

Federal political party

Communist Party of Canada (Marxist–Leninist) Parti communiste du Canada (marxiste–léniniste)
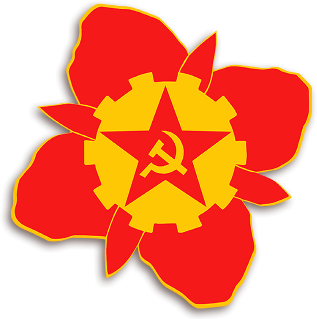
- Abbreviation: CPC(M-L)
- Leader: Anna Di Carlo
- President: Rolf Gerstenberger
- First Secretary: Sandra L. Smith
- Founder: Hardial Bains
- Founded: March 31, 1970; 56 years ago
- Headquarters: PO Box 666, Station C, Montreal, Quebec; H2L 4L5
- Newspaper: The Marxist–Leninist Monthly
- Youth wing: Communist Youth Union of Canada (Marxist-Leninist); Youth for Democratic Renewal
- Ideology: Communism; Marxism–Leninism; Anti-revisionism; Historical: Maoism (1970–1977); Hoxhaism (1977–1992)
- Political position: Far-left
- Colours: Red and yellow
- Senate: 0 / 105
- House of Commons: 0 / 343

Website
- www.cpcml.ca

The Communist Party of Canada (Marxist–Leninist) (abbr. CPC(M-L)) (Note: French: Parti communiste du Canada (marxiste–léniniste), PCC(M-L)) is an anti-revisionist, Marxist–Leninist communist party in Canada, founded in 1970 by Hardial Bains. It has been registered with Elections Canada as a federal political party under the name Marxist–Leninist Party of Canada (MLPC) since 1974. The party is not an offshoot of the Communist Party of Canada; its early membership came from student-led organizations active in the 1960s. After a period of alignment with Maoism and China, the CPC(M-L) pursued a Hoxhaist, pro-Albanian line until the early 1990s.

Bains led the CPC(M-L) from its founding in 1970 until his death in 1997. Bains' widow Sandra L. Smith succeeded her late husband as First Secretary following his death. Elections Canada lists Anna Di Carlo as the head of the electorally-registered organization. None of the party's candidates have been elected. Since the 1970s, the party has had a larger electoral campaign presence than the CPC. It ran its largest number of candidates in 1980 when it nominated 177 candidates, contesting 63 percent of the country's electoral districts.

The party publishes an online newspaper named The Marxist–Leninist Monthly.

== Origins ==
The CPC(M-L) developed from a progression of student-led organizations during the 1960s. It was created primarily as a result of the efforts of Marxist student activist Hardial Bains, who was the founder and national leader of the CPC(M-L) until his death in 1997. The CPC(M-L) was not created from a split from the Communist Party of Canada (CPC). The party emerged during a period of growing student and youth activism. At this time, the CPC was still struggling to break out of isolation it faced during the Cold War; it also suffered from a major rupture in the international communist movement between the People's Republic of China and the Soviet Union, the latter of which the CPC had traditionally supported.

=== Hardial Bains and the Sino-Soviet split ===
Bains came from Mahilpur in Hoshiarpur District of Punjab, India. His family were members or supporters of the Communist Party of India (CPI) and he joined its youth wing. The CPI that Bains knew as a teenager was a mass and militant party. Operating underground for part of the 1950s, the CPI won back its legality in time for the general elections of 1957, where it emerged as the largest opposition party in the country and held state government in Kerala. By this time, however, a young Bains had apparently quit the CPI in protest of its acceptance of Nikita Khrushchev's criticisms of Joseph Stalin. Bains, according to the CPC(M-L)'s official biography, immigrated to Canada from India two years later in 1959 at age nineteen. In Vancouver, he pursued post-graduate studies at the University of British Columbia from 1960 to 1965, in bacteriology.

During this time, the international communist movement went through a major internal crisis and upheaval with the Sino-Soviet split. Developing from 1960 on, sharp polemics over revolutionary strategy were exchanged between the two countries.

In Canada, the Sino-Soviet split was less sharply divisive than demoralizing for the communists. In the ensuing 15 years, the CPC had lost all of its limited gains in parliament under the pressure of the Cold War, and communist MP Fred Rose was jailed for sedition. Anti-communism in the labour movement resulted in the expulsion of all communist-led unions from the house of labour, and communists in general were treated as traitors. Following the 1956 revelations by Soviet premier Nikita Khrushchev ("On the Cult of Personality and Its Consequences") about the crimes of Joseph Stalin, the CPC suffered many resignations, and its youth organization, the National Federation of Labour Youth, fell apart briefly. By the time it was reorganized as the Socialist Youth League in the late 1950s, the CPC had lost much of its prior visibility on university campuses—including the University of British Columbia (UBC).

=== The Internationalists ===
Bains arrived at UBC in this vacuum of visible, public revolutionary politics on campus and just as a new generation of student activism was radicalizing. Mass student protests reacted to the Cuban Missile Crisis in October 1962. Bains became actively involved in the political movement of the time and was elected President of the BC Students' Federation in 1964. While he apparently applied to join the CPC during his time as a student activist, Bains never held membership in that party for unknown reasons. Soon after his ideological outlook would eventually harden into Maoism, directly opposed to the pro-Soviet line of the CPC.

Bains played a key role in founding the predecessor to the CPC(M-L) on March 13, 1963, as the "Internationalists", a student group at the UBC championing what they described as anti-revisionism. "If you like to talk, join the Internationalists", opined the UBC student newspaper under the headline "Hot air types form own group." But while co-organizer Mayling Weaver spoke of welcoming "students of any race, religion, or political beliefs", and both asserted that "the university is a coffee-shop", Bains was setting for itself much more adventurous goals than just "an extension to the extra-curricular programme" with "free-wheeling, year-round academic symposiums". Bains desired in The Internationalists to form a future communist movement, founded on what he considered orthodox Marxist revolutionary theory, including opposition to de-Stalinization.

Bains wrote what would become one of the main ideological texts of the CPC(M-L) at this time, The Necessity For Change, which developed from a speech and study guide into what the CPC(M-L) would term "NFC analysis". Summarizing the text, Irish author Connor McCabe notes that:

"The main thrust of Necessity for Change appears to be towards students and academics, in that its criticisms are of intellectual production, and the intellectual industry, in the Western world. The control of ideas, of history, of 'common sense' by the ruling class needs to be challenged, first by a cadre who have un-taught themselves the prevailing ideas and have begun to see the world based on reality rather than the dominant, right-wing, intellectual discourse; then by the working class who will benefit from the intellectual and individual gains made by the cadre once these new ideas, and this new way of thinking, make their way into the working class through the actions of the cadre itself."

These ideas became a foundation as the group developed into a party or, as Bains himself would later say, "the analysis that lays down ideological remoulding as the key to the uninterrupted advance and victory of revolution."

The CPC(M-L) was not therefore born from a fracture within the CPC by supposed "breakaway hardliners" but from the growing radical student movement in Canada of the mid-1960s. Within a few years Bain's group had succeeded in recruiting several hundred members across Canada, including Quebec, without the help of prominent former CPC leaders who had left the CPC and sided with China, such as former MP Dorise Nielsen or labour activist Jack Scott. Meanwhile, and throughout the 1960s, the CPC was struggling to make its presence felt and grasp what its General Secretary Leslie Morris called "the Challenge of the 60s". The CPC's youth organization experimented with a more decentralized model until the late 1960s when it reorganized. One of the few instances of CPC members quitting for the CPC(M-L) was that of a CPC youth activist from UBC who was accused of stealing a magazine subscription list and funds, and then joining the CPC(M-L). In many places, in size and particularly youthfulness, the CPC(M-L) rivalled CPC.

== Maoism ==
In 1968, the Internationalists renamed themselves the "Canadian Student Movement" and then the "Canadian Communist Movement (Marxist–Leninist)". On March 31, 1970, they declared themselves a formal political party, adopting the name "Communist Party of Canada (Marxist–Leninist)". After a legal challenge from the CPC because of confusion at the ballot, Elections Canada ruled that the party's preferred name was too close to that of the CPC, and since that time the party has been known electorally as the Marxist–Leninist Party. The party ran candidates for the House of Commons of Canada during the 1974 federal election under the name of the "Marxist–Leninist Party of Canada". Because of the upsurge of left nationalism in Quebec, two separate parties were maintained until 1974 when the PCQ (ML) was folded into the CPC(M-L).

Bains and the CPC(M-L) strongly criticized the Soviet Union and Cuba as "social imperialist". This stance led CPC(M-L) to support the forces of UNITA in Angola, a nominally socialist group who were fighting the Cuban expeditionary forces sent to Angola. Eventually it was revealed that UNITA was covertly supported by the United States and Apartheid South Africa. Projecting themselves as more militant, Marxist, revolutionary and youthful than the older CPC, the CPC(M-L) embraced a strident, "vigorous" or even righteous rhetoric, even arguing for a two-stage struggle for Canada's liberation from US imperialist domination and "self-determination for the Canadian people".

=== International relations ===
Despite the self-proclaimed allegiance of the CPC(M-L) to the People's Republic of China, the Chinese Communist Party never recognized the CPC(M-L) as its official representative in Canada. By the mid-1970s there were at least five anti-revisionist, pro-China parties in Canada which debated forcefully with each other and—in particular—strongly condemned the CPC. This included Quebec-based En lutte! and the Workers' Communist Party of Canada which also drew primarily from students (and not always from working-class backgrounds, such as Pierre Karl Péladeau). For a few years until this pro-Maoist wave of youthful political action fell apart in the early 1980s, the combined membership of pro-China communist parties also outnumbered the CPC.

While the CPC(M-L) was unsuccessful uniting these tendencies together, Bains was very active forming similar anti-revisionist ML groupings around the world which were influenced by his writings and theory. Pro-Chinese ML groups came together in Ireland, Britain, Trinidad and Tobago, India and the USA. In 1967, Bains' "Necessity for Change" conference in London saw most of the Irish delegation reportedly walk out. Those who stayed went on to form the Communist Party of Ireland (Marxist–Leninist) and the Revolutionary Communist Party of Britain (Marxist–Leninist). Bains was a friend of well-known avant garde British composer Cornelius Cardew, who was linked to the British party, and the CPC(M-L) hosted Cardew on tour in Canada with a youth concert and variety show. (Bains also contributed the lyrics to Cardew's signature song from his later period, "We Sing for the Future".)

In the United States, the CPC(M-L) likewise sought out fraternal allies. Bains helped found and work with a succession of variously named groups which evolved into the Marxist–Leninist Party, USA. Reflecting the divided political landscape characterizing many of the New Left groups, Bains's group did not work with similarly named Communist Party USA (Marxist–Leninist) of Michael Laski or Michael Klonsky's Communist Party (Marxist–Leninist) (United States).

But the CPC(M-L)'s efforts were perhaps most successful in India. Bains and the CPC(M-L) maintained close links with Indian politics through the growing Indian immigrant community in Canada. In 1970, the party helped found the Hindustani Ghadar Party – Organisation of Indian Marxist–Leninists Abroad group. Initially pro-Naxalite, the group later developed into an Indian-based political party over the course of the decade. Bains also founded a business enterprise in New Delhi.

== Turn to Albania ==
By 1976, CPC(M-L) began to support the criticisms of Chinese foreign policy and the "Theory of Three Worlds" made by the Party of Labour of Albania (PLA). By 1977, one year after the death of Mao Zedong, the CPC(M-L) declared that China had degenerated into revisionism, and later that Mao was not a Marxist–Leninist. Unlike the Chinese government, the government of Albania publicly recognized CPC(M-L) as the vanguard party in Canada, and delegations made many visits to Albania prior to the collapse of the PLA and the overturn of socialism in Albania. In 1978, the CPC(M-L) held a large international rally – a tactic popular with pro-Albania parties at the time – in Montreal that included a delegation from the PLA.

The following year the CPC(M-L) organized an international conference with a number of anti-revisionist forces, with the PLA holding a prominent position. Also in attendance were parties from Italy, France, Iran, India, Great Britain, Portugal, the United States, Chile, and Venezuela. These conferences firmly cemented the CPC(M-L)'s position as the official pro-Albania party in Canada and its bookshops all carried regular literature from the Albanian government.

Unlike the strategy of the CPC, which engaged itself with existing labour and people's movements including those were more inclined to support the New Democratic Party, the CPC(M-L) favoured forming front organizations which it fully controlled. This approach, and contrarian attitude to the position of most anti-war forces at the time, left the CPC(M-L) disconnected from the peace and labour movements as the party set up various rival committees. At times, other leftist groups accused the CPC(M-L) of attacking them in protests and rallies with sticks and bats.

The new party continued to fare much better among students, winning influence over the editorial boards of a number of student newspapers and organizing several campus groups which were subject to police surveillance, harassment and repression. The Ontarion at the University of Guelph and The Chevron at the University of Waterloo carried a pro-CPC(M-L) editorial line for a time during the 1970s. Over time, the CPC(M-L) was ousted from all of these student newspapers, as flamboyant leftist politics began to disappear from the Canadian campus landscape in the 1980s. The party also made gains in the Indo-Canadian community especially through the East Indian Defense Committee (EIDC). Also in 1980, the Canadian-based Hindustani Ghadar Party became the Communist Ghadar Party of India.

The CPC(M-L) continued to participate in most federal elections, following their entrance on the federal scene with 104 candidates in 1974. In the 31st general election held in May 1979, the party fielded 144 candidates. In the 32nd general election held in February 1980, there were 170 Marxist–Leninist candidates. In the 33rd general election held in September 1984, the Marxist–Leninist Party of Canada did not field any candidates.

=== Crisis of the anti-revisionist parties ===
By the early 1980s, many of the anti-revisionist parties of the 1960s and 1970s in Canada and internationally began to fade. Partly, the rigorous discipline demanded of members of these groups including tithes for membership dues, frequent long meetings, confrontation with the police and harassment, all took its toll and as young students became the parents of young families. As neo-conservatism rose, the revolutionary optimism which seemed justified a few years ago started to appear less realistic. Many of the smaller anti-revisionist groups simply folded. In 1983, Roger Rashi's Workers' Communist Party imploded over the question of Cambodia and Pol Pot as well as alleged internal party sexism within the leadership. In Struggle! (En Lutte!) had already suffered a similar fate in 1982.

The CPC(M-L), however, generally lasted through these ideological, political and organization crises. One guiding light was the party's relationship with the Party of Labour of Albania (PLA), the only party in North America to have an official relationship with the PLA as the Albanian government somewhat distanced itself from U.S. pro-Albanian groups fearing of "CIA infiltration". Another base was the parties work in the Indo-Canadian community and its anti-racist work.

=== East Indian Defence Committee ===
In addition to the East Indian Defence Committee (EIDC), founded to oppose "state-organized racist attacks", the CPC(M-L) also launched a West Indian Peoples' Organization (WIPO), Canadian Peoples' Defence Committee, and Peoples Front (PF) against racist and fascist violence. These organizations worked implement the slogans "an injury to one is an injury to all" and "an attack on one is an attack on all" and "all for one and one for all" and "self-defence is the only way". Active, popular and with a large following, these front groups were well known for their opposition to racism by the end of the 1970s.

By the 1980s, community centres for the EIDC had been established in Winnipeg, Toronto and Vancouver under the name "Desh Bhagat Temple" (DBT). Housed in relatively large buildings which were purchased with money contributed by ordinary people, mainly from the East Indian community, they were managed by the EIDC and owned by a trust set up by the EIDC. The centres were regularly used for CPC(M-L) meetings, and rented at cost for other social occasions.

=== Canadian Cultural Workers' Committee ===
As one of the many front organizations of the CPC(M-L), the Canadian Cultural Workers' Committee released an album, titled The Party is the Most Precious Thing. The albums had 10 songs, including "Here is the Rose," about the history of the CPC(M-L); "Oh Albania, Red Star that Burns Bright" about Albania and her government's anti-revisionist stance; and "Levesque Doesn't Wear His Specs," criticizing Quebec separatist René Lévesque following him accidentally running over a homeless man in the middle of the night because he was not wearing his glasses. The album was part of a greater attempt to use Canadian culture to rally support for the CPC(M-L).

== Shift to "democratic renewal" ==
Serious problems in the socialist movement, however, developed in the late 1980s with the crisis in and the dissolution of the Soviet Union. "Many [communist] parties, especially in the West, have gone over from 'because it is socialism it can have no problems' position to 'because so many problems emerged, it is socialism which does not work'!" Bains wrote. But soon it became clear that these developments were not only threatening the future of the Soviet Union. Almost immediately following Enver Hoxha's death in 1985, reform movements sprung up in Albania which was the last Eastern Bloc country to overturn socialism in 1992.

The overturn of socialism in Albania and the Soviet Union had negative impacts for the CPC(M-L). In the 34th General Election in November 1988, it fielded 58 candidates whose names appeared on the ballot as non-affiliated due to the party's failure to meet the time-line registration provisions of the Canada Elections Act at the time. During this time, the party began to liquidate the EIDC centres generating about $2 million in profit from the sales of the properties. There had already been considerable speculation about the CPC(M-L)'s high levels of funding for some time by other left groups. (Like all registered parties the MLPC's finances are available to the public and annually audited in accordance to Elections Canada regulations.)

In response, during the late 1980s, the CPC(M-L) adopted the slogan "We are our own models", and began to seek a new ideological approach, eventually talking less about socialism and taking a positive view of both Cuba and North Korea. Bains visited Cuba several times in the 1990s which led him (and the CPC(M-L)) to reconsider his earlier views of Cuba as revisionist.

The CPC(M-L) was closely aligned with the Canadian Party for Renewal in 1993. On January 1, 1995, the party put forward a broad program of work, which it named the Historic Initiative. This was further elaborated during its Seventh Congress.

During the 1990s, the party called for a popular referendum on the budget cuts initiated by the federal Liberal government of Jean Chrétien. The language of the CPC(M-L) has increasingly centred on its concept of "democratic renewal" oriented on electoral reform and "empowerment of the people", dropping its earlier sharp polemics against labour, social movements, and the Communist Party of Canada.

=== Canadian Renewal Party ===
Canadian Renewal Party
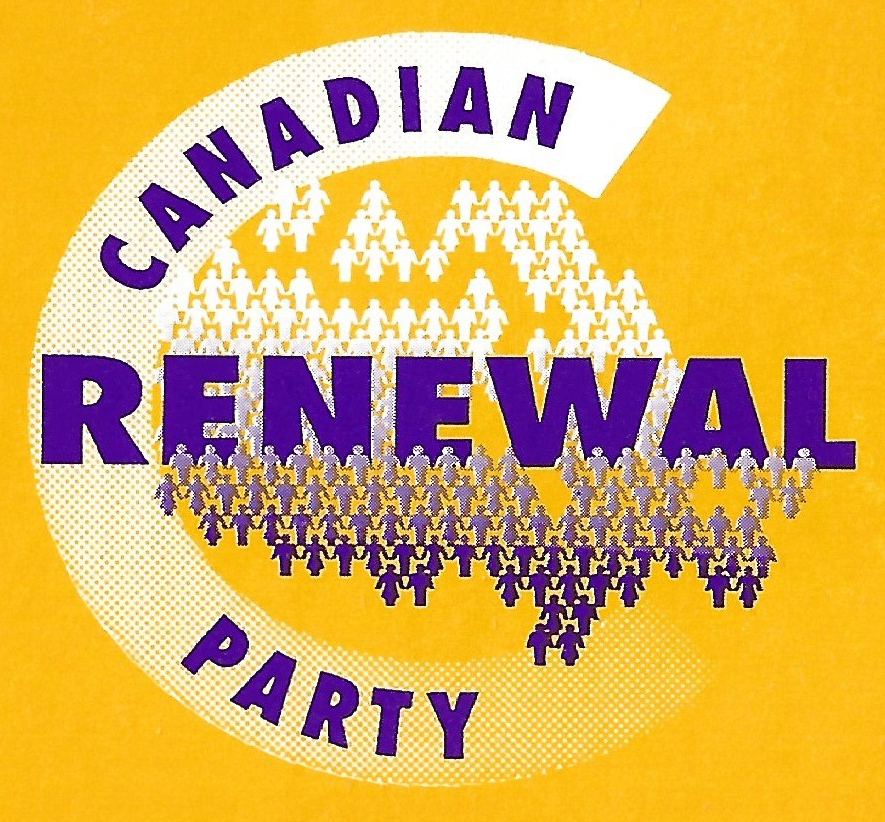
- Leader: Hardial Bains
- Founded: 1993
- Ideology: Direct democracy
- National affiliation: Communist Party of Canada (Marxist–Leninist)
- Slogan: "Accountability begins at home"

The Canadian Renewal Party was an unregistered political party in Canada, established in 1993. It was closely aligned with the Communist Party of Canada (Marxist–Leninist).

When the Renewal Party was launched in early 1993, supporter Robert Cruise described it as "a strictly non-partisan organization without ideological bias," whose purpose was to seek "broad unity around a minimum program of changing the political process so as to empower Canadians." He said that the party would give citizens control over the selection of parliamentarians, who could be recalled by the electorate if they did not act in the interest of the people. The Renewal Party also favoured direct democracy initiatives such as referendums and ballot propositions.

Cruise was himself a candidate of the Marxist–Leninist Party in 1993, and he launched his campaign in partnership with two Renewal candidates from neighbouring ridings (both of whom later officially registered as Marxist–Leninists). He denied that the Renewal Party was a front organization, however, and said that it was open for anyone to join. In the same period, Marxist–Leninist Party leader Hardial Bains said that his organization was the only political organization in Canada to put all of its resources at the disposal of the Renewal Party.

There are conflicting reports as to the identity of the Renewal Party's leader. A Windsor Star report from September 13, 1993, lists Jeffrey Goodman as having held this position. A report from the same newspaper later in the month indicates that Hardial Bains was the national leader of both parties.

The Renewal Party used the slogan, "Accountability begins at home," for the 1993 federal election. It did not run enough candidates to be recognized as an official party by Elections Canada, and its candidates appeared on the ballot as "non-affiliated". The Renewal Party appears to have been dissolved after this time, and several Renewal candidates from 1993 later ran as Marxist–Leninist Party candidates.

In Ontario, several candidates affiliated with the Marxist–Leninist Party ran for the Ontario Renewal Party in the 1995 provincial election. The Marxist–Leninists also endorsed ten independent Renewal candidates in 2003. The Marxist–Leninist Party is not registered provincially in Ontario.

=== Bains' death and legacy ===
Bains died in 1997; his widow, Sandra L. Smith, replaced him as the leader of the CPC(M-L). Bains' funeral was a significant occasion for the party who have held several memorials in his honour and, although he was cremated, purchased a grave plot in The National Cemetery of Canada in Ottawa, Canada's national cemetery. The party eulogy said:

"Comrade Bains, the twinkle in your eyes, your mischievous smile, your beautiful artistic hands, your fine mind, your tender love for all of us they all combined to work a magic. Who could resist your purity, your sincerity, your drive to bring out the best in everyone you met, in everyone you worked with, no matter what their age, what their standing in life, what their ideas or opinions? Meeting you was like falling in love at first sight, over and over and over again, just as you too fell in love with the best in everyone, bringing out whatever they had to offer to make this world, 'where tears are hung on every tree', a better place ..."

According to the CPC(M-L) website, the 8 by 5 1/2 foot memorial is made of granite quarried in Jhansi, India. The monument is emblazoned with a hammer and sickle and star of CPC(M-L) and inscribed with the slogan "Workers of All Countries Unite!" and, on the other side, the party's motto and a prominent plaque to Bains. Also carved on the monument are the lines "Vous êtes le rouge de notre drapeau – Lal Salaam" (You are the red of our flag – Red Salute) and the names of other past veteran members.

Following his death, the CPC(M-L) established the Hardial Bains Party School on Journalism. The party continues to reproduce his works on its website and honour his memory, and he is also remembered somewhat in India.

== Political positions ==
After Bains's death, the party shrunk considerably. The Manitoba wing of the CPC(M-L) has not run candidates in Manitoba for several years and is no longer a registered provincial party. In 2008, Anna Di Carlo became the leader of the party's electoral arm, the Marxist–Leninist Party of Canada (MLPC) while Smith remains First Secretary of the CPC(M-L) and president of the MLPC.

The CPC(M-L) currently sees as its immediate goal the "vesting of sovereignty in the people so that they can exercise control over their lives" and "organizing Canadians to empower themselves". The party's motto is, "The issue is not to wave the red flags, but to show our colours through our deeds."

Today, the CPC(M-L) tends to be supportive of North Korea's right to self-determination, although it does not promote Kim Il Sung and Kim Jong-il or juche in the manner that it promoted Enver Hoxha and Mao Zedong in previous years. However, it issued a statement mourning the death of Kim Jong-il. The CPC(M-L) has become strongly supportive of Cuba and the Cuban Revolution and now has close relations with the Cuban Embassy in Ottawa. It prints the English language edition of the Communist Party of Cuba's newspaper, Granma, for Canadian distribution.

CPC(M-L) members are active in several trade unions, particularly the Canadian Union of Postal Workers and the United Steelworkers of America whose Stelco local (Local 1005) in Hamilton, Ontario was led by party vice-president Rolf Gerstenberger, until he retired on May 5, 2015. Local 1005 is one of several USWA locals at Stelco.

CPC(M-L) members have also been active in the movement against the wars in Iraq and Afghanistan.

The party has adopted its own "Contemporary Marxist–Leninist Thought". Its Eighth Party Congress was to be held in 2005 with the theme "Laying the Foundations for the Mass Communist Party", but the congress was delayed because of the federal election. The congress was held in September 2008.

The CPC(M-L) has a news-sheet, The Marxist–Leninist Daily, and a youth wing, the Communist Youth Union of Canada (Marxist–Leninist). It operates the "Workers Centre" which helps educate and organize trade unionists through discussion groups, and a magazine, Worker's Forum. The party often conducts broader political activity under the name "People's Front" and uses that name for its provincial wing in British Columbia. In Ontario, CPC(M-L) supporters ran as Independent Renewal candidates in the 2003 provincial election.

== Party leaders ==
- Hardial Bains (1970–1997)
- Sandra L. Smith (1998–2008), widow of Bains
- Anna Di Carlo (2008–present)

== Election results ==
Election	Leader	Candidates	Seats won	Votes	Vote share	Vote share in ridings contested
1974	Hardial Bains	104 / 264	0	16,261	0.17%	[data missing]
1979	Hardial Bains	144 / 282	0	14,231	0.12%	[data missing]
1980	Hardial Bains	177 / 282	0	14,697	0.13%	[data missing]
1993	Hardial Bains	51 / 295	0	5,202	0.04%	0.214%
1997	Hardial Bains	65 / 301	0	11,468	0.09%	0.403%
2000	Sandra L. Smith	84 / 301	0	12,068	0.09%	0.319%
2004	Sandra L. Smith	76 / 308	0	8,696	0.06%	0.243%
2006	Sandra L. Smith	69 / 308	0	8,980	0.06%	0.253%
2008	Sandra L. Smith	59 / 308	0	8,565	0.06%	0.305%
2011	Anna Di Carlo	70 / 308	0	9,925	0.07%	0.278%
2015	Anna Di Carlo	70 / 338	0	9,105	0.05%	0.235%
2019	Anna Di Carlo	50 / 338	0	4,124	0.02%	0.154%
2021	Anna Di Carlo	36 / 338	0	4,532	0.03%	0.256%
2025	Anna Di Carlo	35 / 343	0	4,996	0.03%	0.284%

Average number of votes per candidate

== Publications ==
- Hardial Bains, A Power to Share: A Modern Definition of the Political Process and a Case for its Democratic Renewal, Ottawa: 1993.

== See also ==
- Revolutionary Communist Party of Britain (Marxist–Leninist)
- Communist Party of Ireland (Marxist–Leninist)
