= Communist Party of Ireland (Marxist–Leninist) =

Communist Party of Ireland (Marxist–Leninist) Páirtí Cumannach na hÉireann
- Founded: 1965
- Dissolved: 2003
- Newspaper: Red Patriot (1969-1984)
- Ideology: Communism; Marxism–Leninism; Irish republicanism; Anti-revisionism; Hoxhaism; Maoism (until 1978)
- Political position: Far-left

The Communist Party of Ireland (Marxist–Leninist) was an anti-revisionist political party based in Ireland. It had strong links to the Party of Labour of Albania, Communist Party of Canada (Marxist–Leninist) and Revolutionary Communist Party of Britain (Marxist–Leninist).

== History ==
=== Background ===
Proposed flag for a "New Democratic Ireland" envisioned by CPI(ML), based on the Chinese national flag

CPI (ML) originated from the "Internationalists in Ireland", a group started on 9 December 1965 by Hardial Bains, while he was working as a microbiologist at Trinity College, Dublin. His efforts culminated in the "Necessity for Change" conference, at which delegates from Canada, India, Ireland and Britain pledged to build Marxist–Leninist parties in their countries. They rejected Nikita Khrushchev's policies, which they regarded as revisionist, and followed a Marxist–Leninist course. In 1968, the Internationalists came to public attention as they organised a protest against the visit of King Baudouin of Belgium to Trinity College. In 1969, they renamed themselves the Irish Communist Movement (Marxist–Leninist). The ICM opposed the Warsaw Pact invasion of Czechoslovakia. On 4 July 1970 they relaunched themselves as the CPI (ML), with Michael Hehir named as the "leading national spokesman".

CPI (ML) participated in the 1974 UK parliamentary election. It had candidates in three constituencies in Northern Ireland. In total they got 540 votes, between 0.2%-0.5% in each constituency. CPI (ML) member David Vipond stood in the 1973 Monaghan by-election, receiving 157 first preference votes. Vipond later stood for election in Dublin along with other CPI (ML) members.

CPI (ML) ran a bookstore in Dublin called Progressive Books and Periodicals at 25 Essex St, Dublin 8. For a short period in 1970, CPI (ML) had bookshops in Limerick (11 Castle Parade, Nicholas Street, opposite King John's Castle) and Cork (1 Cattle Market Street (later Blarney Street), off Shandon Street). In the early 1970s, the group's General Secretary was Carole Reakes.

=== Hoxhaism ===
Red Patriot, CPI (ML) organ

CPI (ML) originally upheld Mao Zedong Thought - particularly in the 1970-71 period during which entire issues of Red Patriot were dedicated to Mao Zedong but they flatly rejected Mao Zedong after the Sino-Albanian split of 1978, after which they upheld the writings of Albanian leader Enver Hoxha. The CPI (ML) organised several delegations to Albania, beginning in June 1979, (when the delegation met Ramiz Alia); CPI (ML) delegations there continued during the 80s. The CPI (ML) also supported the communist movements of Vietnam and Cambodia. They also expressed some support for the Gang of Four faction in China.

=== The Troubles ===
The CPI (ML) were strongly critical of other Irish left-wing parties, including the Workers' Party, Irish Labour Party and the Communist Party of Ireland, whom the CPI (ML) accused of being "revisionist" and of not supporting the IRA's campaign in the North. They were especially hostile to Brendan Clifford and his British and Irish Communist Organisation, whose support for the Partition of Ireland and the British Army in Northern Ireland the CPI (ML) regarded as a complete betrayal of Maoism.

The CPI (ML) supported armed struggle for the reunification of Ireland and initiated the Spirit of Freedom Committee to work with Irish republicans. Other groups created by the party were the Workers and Unemployed Movement and the Communist Youth Union of Ireland (Marxist–Leninist).

In the early 1980s, the CPI (ML) was a major force in the students' union movement, with member Brendan Doris becoming president of the Union of Students in Ireland (USI), while member Tommy Graham became president of the College of Technology (Bolton Street) Students' Union. Tommy Graham is the current editor of History Ireland.

=== Later years ===
With the collapse of socialism in Albania, the CPI (ML) opened up relations with the Workers' Party of Korea and signed the 1992 Pyongyang Declaration. General Secretary Rod Eley visited North Korea in 1999. In 2003 CPI (ML) was disbanded, following a long period of passivity. Upon dissolution, the general secretary of CPI (ML) was Rod Eley. Following the group's dissolution, former leading member Brendan Doris stood in the 2011 Dublin West by-election for An Chomhdháil Phobail/The People's Convention (CPPC), achieving 95 first preference votes.

== See also ==
- List of anti-revisionist groups
