= Albania–China relations =

- Albania: China

Albania and the People's Republic of China established diplomatic relations on November 23, 1949. Albania has an embassy in Beijing and China has an embassy in Tirana.

== History ==
=== 1950s: Early stage of diplomatic relations ===
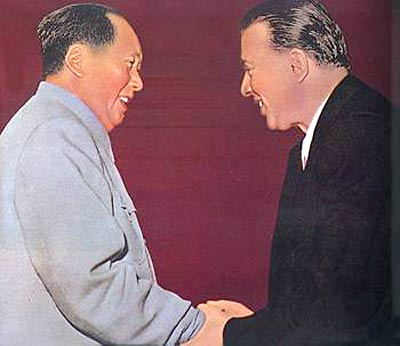
When the Eighth National Congress of the Chinese Communist Party was held in 1956, Mao Zedong met with Enver Hoxha.

The two countries established diplomatic relations on November 23, 1949. In 1954, they exchanged ambassadors. Starting that year, the People's Republic of China provided economic assistance to Albania. High level visits began in late 1956 with a visit to Albania by a Chinese delegation led by Peng Zhen.

Albania, which was weak in the socialist camp in Eastern Europe, leaned towards the Soviet Union after the conflict broke out between the Soviet Union and Yugoslavia, supported Joseph Stalin's policy, and was protected by the Soviet Union. However, after Stalin's death, Nikita Khrushchev, who succeeded as the first secretary of the CPSU Central Committee, completely rejected Stalin's policy and fixed relations with Yugoslavia. Albania opposed Khrushchev's approach for its own interests. During the same period, China also criticized the new soviet government of Khruschev and severed diplomatic relations with Yugoslavia.

According to Eugene K. Keefe et al.:

During the 1950s the Albanian leadership, coaxed by Moscow, made some attempts at restoring normal relations with Yugoslavia. After the riots in Poland and the revolt in Hungary in 1956, however, the Albanians raised strident voices against Yugoslavia's so-called revisionism--that is the alleged perversion of Marxism-Leninism--which they asserted was the basis for the troubles afflicting Eastern Europe. According to official Albanian dogma the two greatest evils in the world were revisionism and imperialism, personified, respectively, by Yugoslavia and the United States. Toward the end of the 1950s it became apparent to Hoxha and Shehu that they were closer ideologically to Peking than to Moscow, and only the latter's economic aid prevented an open break.
In 1960, as Khrushchev sought to line up Communist parties for a condemnation of Communist China, Albania refused to participate and, by the end of the year, the Soviet-Albanian dispute was made known openly. By the end of 1961 diplomatic relations between the two countries were severed, Soviet aid ceased, and Soviet advisers and technicians left Albania, to be replaced by those of Communist China. Although not formally breaking off diplomatic relations, the other Eastern European Communist countries also halted aid programs and withdrew advisers. Khrushchev then became the object of violent attacks in the Albanian press, being castigated as more of a revisionist than Tito. Khrushchev counterattacked to defend himself but, in addition, used Albania as a proxy for violent propaganda blasts that were obviously directed against the Chinese Communists.
After the final break with the Soviet Union, Albania entered the third stage of its Communist existence--the alliance with Communist China. Stages one and two had been as a satellite, first of Yugoslavia and then of the Soviet Union. In stage three, if not a satellite, it was a client of a powerful sponsor. Albania, throughout the 1960s and into 1970, continued to require the economic support of an outside power. Communist China has provided that support, though apparently on a much reduced scale.
In return for Chinese support the Albanians accept the Chinese view of world affairs and speak for their sponsor in Eastern Europe and in the United Nations. Albania successfully defied Moscow, but its internal and international positions remained weak. In 1968 Hoxha withdrew his country from the Warsaw Pact in protest against the invasion of Czechoslovakia, but this was primarily a symbolic move because Albania had not participated in Warsaw Pact affairs since 1961.

=== Building a close relationship ===
After the Sino-Soviet Split, Albania became one of China's closest partners.

At the Bucharest Conference held on June 20–25, 1960, the Communist Party of the Soviet Union and the Communist or Workers’ Party of pro-Soviet socialist countries launched an attack on China. The Party of Labour of Albania, which chose to stand on the same front with the Chinese Communist Party (CCP), was also criticized by the Soviet Union.

In early June before the meeting, when the leaders of the CCP met with the leaders of the Party of Labour of Albania, they explained the differences of opinion between the Chinese and Soviet Communist Parties and their own opinions. From June 5 to 9, the eleventh meeting of the Council of the World Federation of Trade Unions was held in Beijing. At the meeting, the Soviet Union and the Chinese Communist government had different opinions. On June 17, the delegation of the Council of the Chinese and Soviet Union of Trade Unions met. The representatives of the Soviet Union accused the Chinese Communist government and Albania of opening up the differences between the two parties and attempting to split the international communist movement.

At the Bucharest Conference on June 20, Khrushchev first attacked the policies of the CCP, including "supporting the policies of the Stalin era to subvert the Soviet Union" and "domestic policy errors such as the Great Leap Forward". After the Bulgarian participant's speech in support of the Soviet Union ended, the spokesperson of the Albanian Party stated that the differences between the Chinese and Soviet parties can be resolved in the discussion and should not be discussed in such a meeting. And in the discussion that followed, he clearly supported the CCP. From then on, Albania became more inclined to China. Therefore, the Soviet Union unilaterally tore up the economic and military assistance contract to Albania in 1961, refused its participation in the Warsaw Pact meeting and eventually broke off diplomatic relations with it. The diplomatic relations between China and Albania had been strengthened. When Premier Zhou Enlai visited Albania, Albania held a mass welcome rally of more than 100,000 people every time, and leaders often welcomed them all. When the Albanian leaders visited China, all party and state leaders except Chairman Mao Zedong of the Central Committee of the Chinese Communist Party greeted them at the airport. They also organized millions of people in Beijing to welcome them.

=== Start of large-scale economic and material assistance by China ===
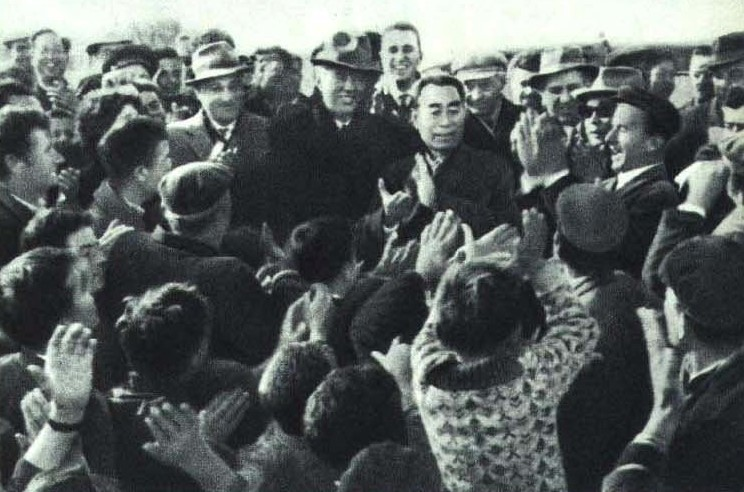
Zhou Enlai visiting Albania in 1963

After the Soviet Union stopped providing aid to Albania, Albania and China anticipated Chinese aid to fill the gap, with Mao stating to the Albanian side, "One good friend is just enough." Albania was a major recipient of Chinese aid during the 1960s. In 1961, during the Great Chinese Famine, China provided Albania with hundreds of thousands of tons of grain, 250 million yuan in foreign exchange aid, and 19 complete projects. At the request of the Albanian side, the Chinese Communist government ordered the shipment of grain from Canada to Albania. Albanian leadership was initially alarmed by the Cultural Revolution in China, with Enver Hoxha fearing that it would result in the liquidation of the CCP and that Albania could lose its good relationship with the country. China provided Albania with reassurances in late 1966, and the Party of Labour then took a favorable stance on China's Cultural Revolution.

In 1967, an Albanian delegation visited China to gain insight for editing the Albanian translation of Quotations from Chairman Mao Zedong. Mao described the text as a collection of materials with historical insights into China and that "China's experience may serve other countries, but they must judge this for themselves." Throughout the Cultural Revolution, Chinese experts and high level delegations visited Albania.

In 1967, China agreed to finance the Vau i Dejës Hydroelectric Power Station. At its completion in 1973, it provided more than half of Albania's electricity.

When Geng Biao was the ambassador to Albania (around 1969) China's economic and military assistance projects to Albania were worth nearly 9 billion yuan, and used inefficiently. The machinery and materials provided by China were used for non-production purposes (such as cement used to make a large number of monuments).

China assisted in the construction of chromium and nickel mining projects in Albania, and provided China with chromium, nickel and other strategic materials that were scarce at that time, but it also caused overproduction.

Albania advocated for China's positions at the United Nations and served as a proxy for Chinese criticisms of the Soviet Union.

=== From a rift to a break in the relationship ===
In 1969, Mao Zedong worried about the Soviet Union's invasion of China and began to ease the diplomacy of the United States. In Albania, the meeting between Chinese Premier Zhou Enlai and Chairman of the Council of Ministers of the Soviet Union Kosygin reduced the requirements for attending the celebration of the 20th anniversary of the founding of the People's Republic of China, which caused Mao Zedong's dissatisfaction. Relations between the two countries began to cool. During the discussion of the draft joint statement in 1969, the Albanian side did not approve of China's suggestion that the source of revisionism should be written in the statement. Regarding whether there was a class issue in socialist countries, the two sides had different views.

From 1970, the relationship between the CCP and the Albanian Party of Labour had gradually come to a standstill. When China broke its diplomatic isolation in the early 1970s, Mao Zedong, Chairman of the CCP, and other CCP leaders began to reconsider aid to Albania. The Chinese ambassador to Albania, Geng Biao, witnessed the current situation in Albania, and wrote about Albania's massive waste of aid to Qiao Guanhua, the Deputy Minister of European Affairs of the Ministry of Foreign Affairs, and Qiao forwarded it to Mao Zedong. Mao Zedong praised Geng Biao for reflecting the facts. However, the aid did not stop. In 1970, Albania asked China for 3.2 billion yuan in aid, and finally received 1.95 billion yuan in long-term low-interest loans. On the other hand, Tirana, under the leadership of Hoxha, the first secretary of the Albanian Party of Labour, began to improve its international status. Albania started trade negotiations with France, Italy and the newly independent Asian and African countries, and resumed normal relations with Yugoslavia and Greece in 1971. Albania actively reduced its dependence on China by decentralizing trade channels, improving diplomatic and cultural relations (especially with Western European countries). But Albania did not join the Organization for Security and Cooperation in Europe, and refused to participate in the Helsinki Conference held in July 1975.

Albanian leaders were dissatisfied that China resumed friendly relations with the United States in the early 1970s. The newspapers and radio stations in Tirana did not report Nixon's visit to China in 1972. However, Albania, which was still in the United Nations, submitted a draft resolution critical of the General Assembly, so that the People's Republic of China replaced the Republic of China to exercise power in the United Nations. In October 1974, Albania asked China to provide 5 billion yuan in loans, postpone the repayment of loans from 1976 to 1980, and asked China to provide grain and oil assistance. China was at the end of the Cultural Revolution at this time and only promised 1 billion yuan in loans. Albania set off a movement to condemn China and refused to provide the crude oil and asphalt that China needed. In 1975, the two countries signed a batch of long-term interest-free loan protocols.

After Mao Zedong's death in 1976, Hoxha remained optimistic about China-Albania relations. But in August 1977, the newly appointed Chairman of the Central Committee of the Chinese Communist Party and Premier of the State Council Hua Guofeng stated that he would use the Three World Theory as the basis for his new foreign policy. Hoxha regarded it as a way for China to unite with the United States to fight the Soviet Union and seek hegemony in the third world and non-aligned countries, and expressed firm opposition. From August 30 to September 7, 1977, Yugoslavian President Tito visited Beijing and was welcomed by the new leadership of the Chinese Communist Party. The Party of Labour of Albania immediately declared China a revisionist country similar to the Soviet Union and Yugoslavia. China also found it difficult to meet Albania's huge assistance request, and the relationship between the two sides fell to a freezing point. On July 13, 1978, China announced the cessation of aid to Albania. In 1978, in accordance with Deng Xiaoping's instructions, the Ministry of Foreign Affairs of China issued the "Notes of the Ministry of Foreign Affairs of China on Compulsory Suspension of Assistance to Albania and Reception of Experts", which formally terminated assistance to Albania. Enver Hoxha, the top leader of the Albanian government and the first secretary of the Party of Labour, fully opposed the Chinese government from that point on.

=== The new pattern of diplomacy ===
After 1979, Albania suspended all trade, cultural, educational, and technological relations with China, and only retained diplomatic relations at the ambassadorial level. This "hibernation" state of China-Albania relations lasted until 1983. On November 23, 1989, the two countries signed an agreement to establish a China-Albania Economic and Technical Cooperation Mixed Committee. In January 1991, Albanian Foreign Minister Malile visited China. This was the first senior official of the Albanian government to visit China since the deterioration of China-Albanian relations in 1978, but at that time the communist regime in Albania was facing disintegration.

=== Influence on China regarding its aid to Albania ===
According to Geng Biao's calculation in 1969, the CCP's economic and military assistance to Albania since 1954 was nearly 9 billion yuan. At that time, the total population of Albania was only 2 million, with an average of more than 4,000 yuan per person. At that time, the average annual income in China was only more than 200 yuan. The aid to Albania had actually placed a heavy burden on the government.

The breakdown of relations with China left Albania without foreign protection. Albania rejected efforts to restore normal diplomatic relations by the United States and the Soviet Union, but it expanded its diplomatic relations with Western Europe and developing countries, and it also began to adopt self-reliance as the basic strategy of national economic development. This turmoil and the debate on the three world theories divided the world anti-revisionist movement. Most anti-revisionist parties supported the Albanian Party of Labour, while other parties disputed this. This view and the theory which it is based upon were both called Hoxhaism. The Albanian Labour Party's allies were mainly distributed in Africa, Turkey and Latin America, and they included the Communist Party of Brazil and the Tigray Marxist Alliance.

=== Albania's diplomatic moves regarding the one China policy ===
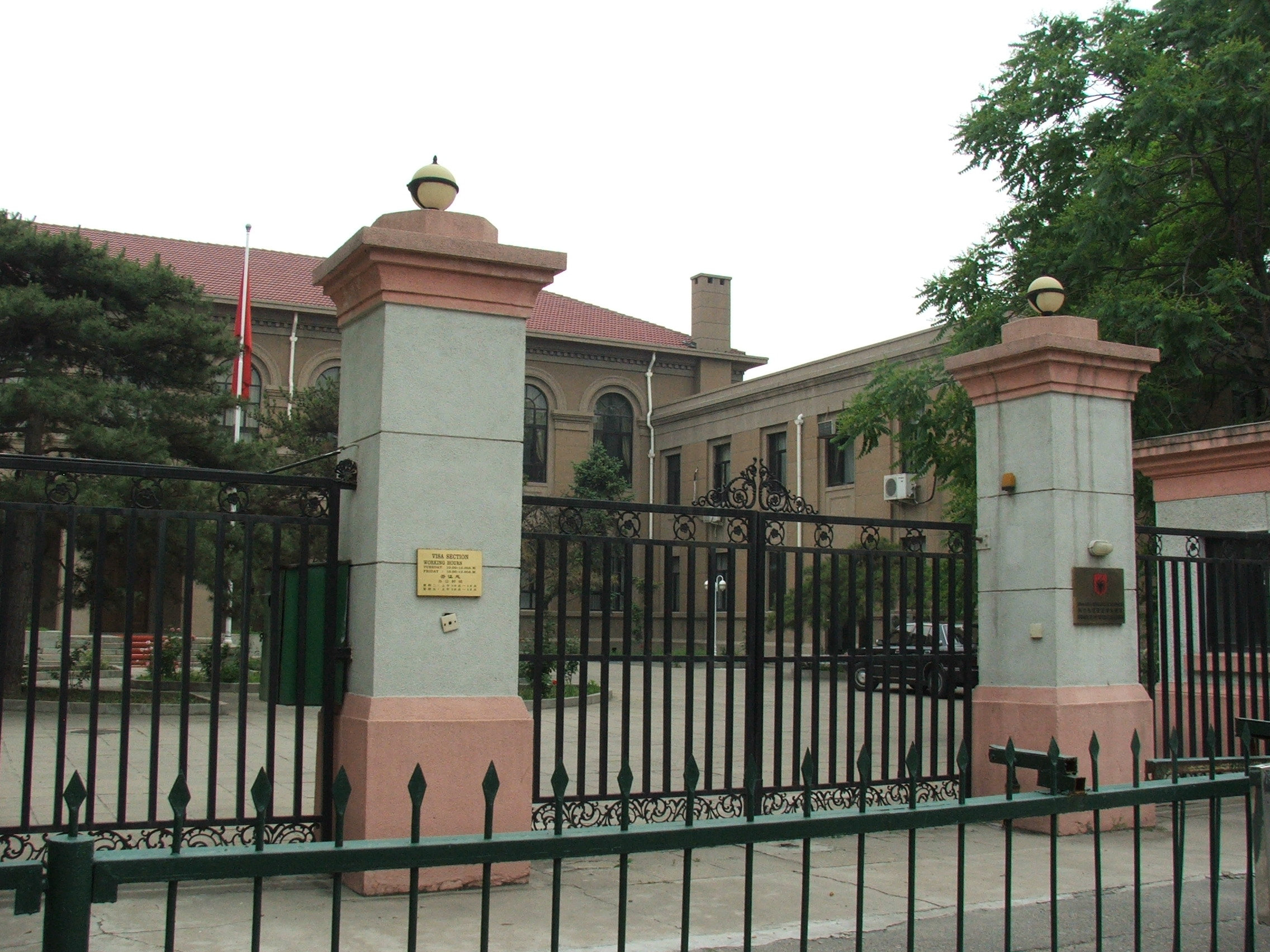
Embassy of Albania in China

From the 1960s onwards, the People's Republic of Albania under Enver Hoxha, moved an annual resolution in the General Assembly to transfer China's seat at the UN from the Republic of China to the People's Republic of China. On October 25, 1971, Resolution 2758, sponsored by Albania, was passed by the General Assembly, withdrawing recognition of the ROC as the legitimate government of China, and recognizing the PRC as the sole legitimate government of China. China considers Albania an important part of its Belt and Road Initiative.

=== Issues with regard to human rights in China ===
At the United Nations on 6 October 2020, Albania was one of a group of 39 signatory countries which released a statement in which it denounced China for its mistreatment of ethnic Uyghurs and other Muslim minorities in Xinjiang and its curtailing of freedoms in Hong Kong.

== Agreements ==
In 2001, the two countries signed three agreements covering financial, mortgage and technical aspects of constructing a new hydroelectric power facility —to be known as Hydro Central— in northern Albania. China also pledged US$126 million in credit to the project.

Albanian Prime Minister Sali Berisha visited Chinese Premier Wen Jiabao in April 2009. Wen put forth a four-point proposal to further cooperation with Albania. It urged both countries to:

- increase exchanges at all levels to cement political relations by using the opportunity of the 60th anniversary of China-Albanian ties;
- promote substantial cooperation based on equality and reciprocity and put more emphasis on information technology, energy, infrastructure, and mining exploration;
- expand cooperation in the areas of culture, public health, agriculture and tourism to enrich bilateral ties;
- strengthen coordination in the United Nations and other international organizations to safeguard the interests of developing nations and unity of the United Nations.

Albania joined the Belt and Road Initiative (BRI) in 2017.

== See also ==
- Foreign relations of Albania
- Foreign relations of China
- List of ambassadors of Albania to China
- Sino-Albanian split
