= Red Patriot =

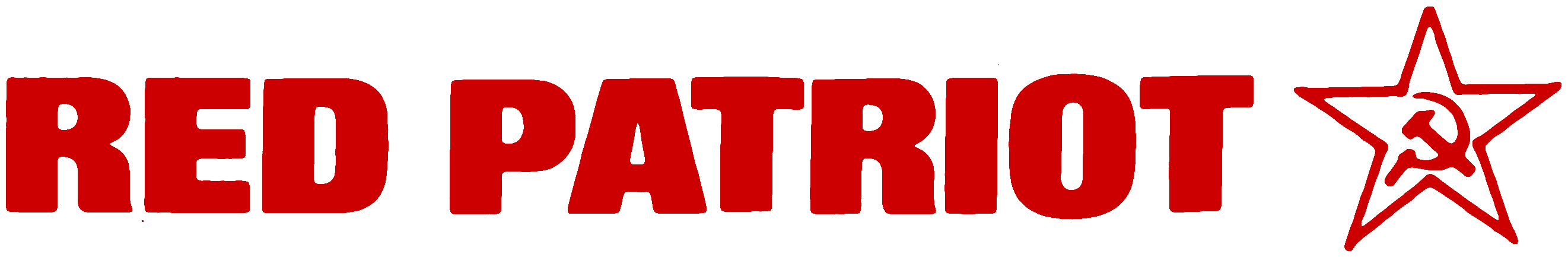
- Type: Weekly Newsletter
- Format: Newsletter
- Owner(s): Communist Party of Ireland (Marxist–Leninist)
- Founded: August 1969
- Political alignment: Marxist-Leninist; Maoist (1969-78); Hoxhaist (1978-84)
- Ceased publication: May 1984
- Relaunched: 1982
- Country: Ireland
- Free online archives: Archives at Marxist Internet Archive

Red Patriot was a publication by the Communist Party of Ireland (Marxist–Leninist), it articulated an anti-revisionist outlook on Irish politics with a Marxist-Leninist stance.

Initially Maoist, the CPI-ML moved away from Mao and sided with an Albanian articulation of Communism - Hoxhaism. Initially published by the forerunner to the CPI-ML, Irish Revolutionary Youth, and launched in 1969, it was produced irregularly throughout the party's history, sometimes as a weekly, sometimes monthly. It was relaunched in 1982 after two years unpublished on the party's twelfth anniversary.

It was replaced in 1984 by The Voice of Revolution, itself replaced by Marxist-Leninist Weekly in 1985.
