= Fighting with two fists =

Chinese government slogan

Fighting with two fists (Chinese: 两个拳头打人; pinyin: Liǎnggè quántóu dǎrén) was the foreign policy of the People's Republic of China from the end of the 1950s to the end of the 1960s, which was to confront both the United States and the Soviet Union at the same time. A similar propaganda slogan was "oppose both imperialism and revisionism". As a result, China became one of the very few countries in the world at that time to confront two superpowers at the same time.

== History ==
The term "two fists hitting people" originated in 1933 during the Chinese Civil War. At that time, the General Advisor of the Comintern Military Council conveyed instructions to the First Front Army of the Red Army, requiring it to fight in two parts. This instruction was thus called "fighting with two fists". From the end of the 1950s to the end of the 1960s, China followed a policy to confront both the United States and the Soviet Union at the same time. A similar propaganda slogan was "oppose both imperialism and revisionism". In the early 1970s, in order to unite with the United States against the Soviet Union, China began to change its policy of from "fighting with two fists" to "One Line, One Large Area".
