= List of ambassadors of Albania to China =

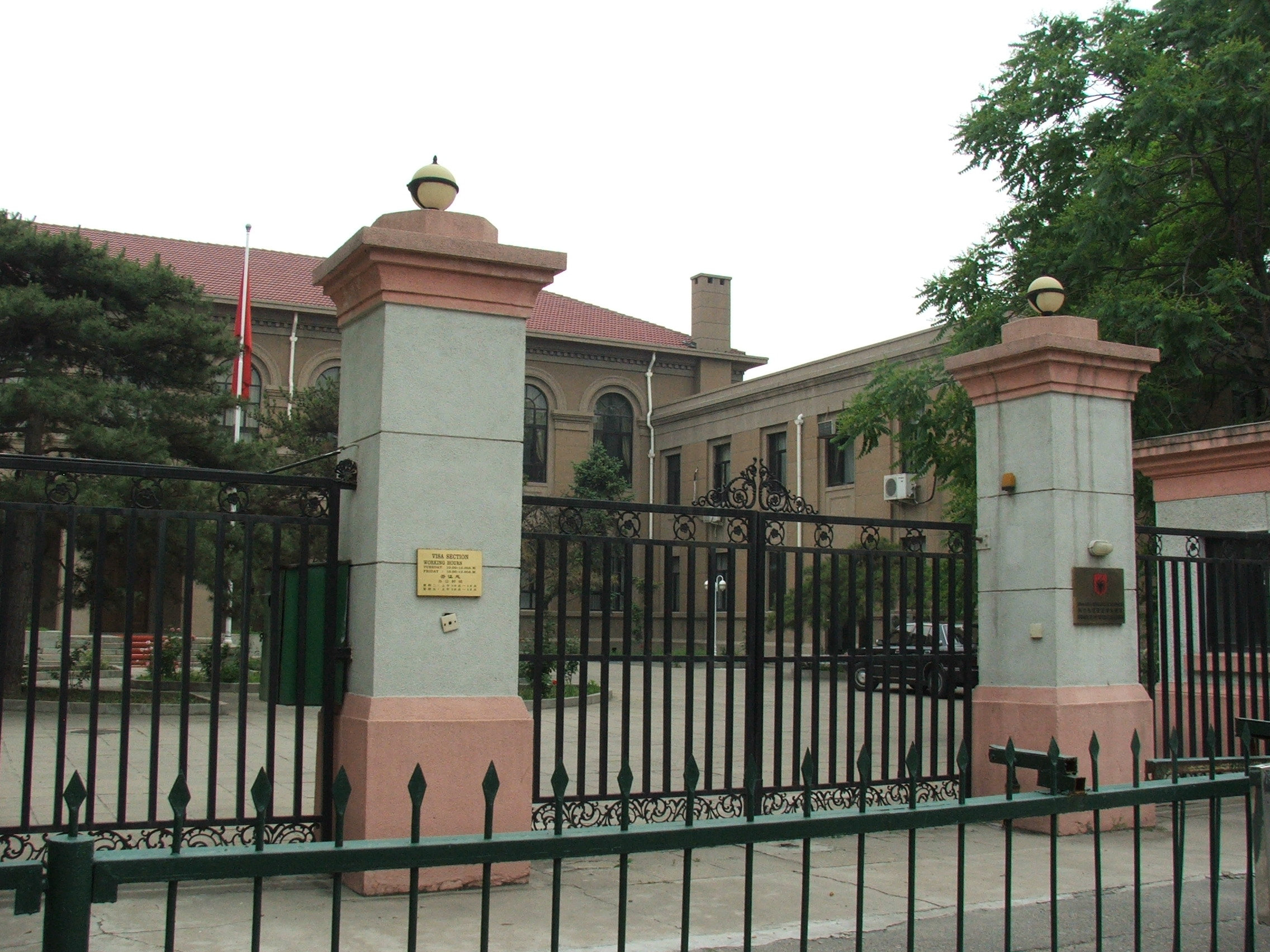
Embassy of Albania in Beijing

Albania established diplomatic relations with China on November 23, 1949. As a United Nations member state, in 1963, Albania proposed and supported diplomatically the readmission of China to this organization. On October 25, 1971, at the 26th session of the General Assembly, the People's Republic of China was fully admitted to the UN.

== List of diplomatic representatives of Albania to China (1954–present) ==
No.	Name	Title	Term served	
1	Nesti Nase	Ambassador	1954	1956
2	Delo Balili	Ambassador	1956	1959
3	Mihal Prifti	Ambassador	1959	1961
4	Reiz Malile	Ambassador	1961	1963
5	Nesti Nase	Ambassador	1963	1966
6	Vasil Nathanaili	Ambassador	1966	1969
7	Xhorxhi Robo	Ambassador	1969	1973
8	Behar Shtylla	Ambassador	1973	1979
9	Jonuz Mersini	Ambassador	1979	1982
10	Dhimitër Stamo	Ambassador	1983	1986
11	Justin Papajorgji	Ambassador	1986	1992
12	Tahir Elezi	Ambassador	1992	1997
13	Hajdar Muneka	Ambassador	1997	2000
14	Kujtim Xhani	Ambassador	2000	2006
15	Maxhun Peka	Ambassador	2006	2011
16	Kujtim Xhani	Ambassador	2011	2016
17	Selim Belortaja	Ambassador	2017	2024

== See also ==
- List of ambassadors of China to Albania
- Albanian–Chinese split
