= Xie Hangsheng =

Chinese diplomat

Xie Hangsheng (Chinese: 谢杭生; lit. 'Xie Hangzhou-born'; born 1955) was a Chinese diplomat. He was born in Hangzhou, Zhejiang. He was Ambassador of the People's Republic of China to Bulgaria (2003–2005) and Denmark (2007–2011). He was a vice-minister of the Ministry of Foreign Affairs of the People's Republic of China.

Preceded by Tao Miaofa	Ambassador of China to Bulgaria; 2003–2005	Succeeded by Yu Zhenqi
Preceded by Zhen Jianguo	Ambassador of China to Denmark; 2007–2011	Succeeded by Li Ruiyu
