= Marxist–Leninist Party, USA =

Marxist-Leninist Party, USA
- Abbreviation: MLP
- Founded: 1967
- Dissolved: 1993
- Succeeded by: Communist Voice Organization (unofficially)
- Ideology: Communism; Marxism–Leninism; Maoism (until 1978); Hoxhaism (until the mid-1980s); Anti-revisionism

The Marxist–Leninist Party, USA (MLP), not to be confused with the earlier “Marxist-Leninist Party”, was an anti-revisionist Marxist–Leninist communist party arising out of a series of communist and workers' groups that began in 1967 and lasted until 1993 when it dissolved. It was founded as the American Communist Workers Movement (Marxist–Leninist) in the 1960s as a Maoist organization allied with the Canadian Communist Party of Canada (Marxist–Leninist), CPC (M-L). During its history, it became a Hoxhaist group, before turning away from backing Albania, then rejecting Maoism and subsequently Stalinism as being revisionist. After its dissolution, the majority of its members who remained active formed the Communist Voice Organization. Its main publication was the paper Workers Advocate.

== History ==
The group's origins lie in a small, predominantly African American, group founded in early 1967 called the Cleveland Draft Resistance Union. In 1968, they reorganized as the Workers Action Committee and broadened their focus from anti-war activities to community organizing, strike support, and the study of Marxism. They embraced Maoism and developed a close relationship with the Canadian Communist Movement (Marxist–Leninist) led by Hardial Bains. In May 1969, the WAC attended a Marxist–Leninist conference in Regina, Canada and established the American Communist Workers' Movement (Marxist-Leninist). It has "just 100 members."

The ACWM emulated some of the strategy expounded by Communist Party of Canada (Marxist–Leninist) leader Hardial Bains, including attempting to launch a daily newspaper. This experiment — the only Maoist daily ever published in the United States — was the People's America Daily News which lasted for 77 issues.

In about 1973, the ACWM merged with several smaller parties, including the FBI front Red Star Cadre (Marxist-Leninist), to form the Central Organization of US Marxist–Leninists. and militantly opposed the police and fascism, as well as socialists and communists they considered "revisionist". The group continued to move with the CPC (M-L) from Maoism to Hoxhaism until in 1980 they adopted the name Marxist–Leninist Party USA and split with the Canadian group the following year after several years of internal issues between the CPC (M-L) and the COUSML. The break with the CPC (M-L) also lead to several other Marxist-Leninist parties breaking ties with the MLP-USA including the Revolutionary Communist Party of Britain (Marxist-Leninist). those who remained loyal to the CPC (M-L) split from the MLP-USA becoming the U.S. Marxist–Leninist Organization.

The break with the CPC (M-L) led to the MLP beginning a reassessment of its politics, partially in an attempt to draw other anti-revisionists towards it, as many groups claiming anti-revisionism were moving to the right-wing. By the late 1980s, the MLP had come to the conclusion that anti-revisionism meant that they had to reject the traditional support of the communist movement's positions from the time of the 1935 Congress of the Comintern onwards. This decision, however, led to an ideological impasse in the MLP, and at its fifth Congress in November 1993, it voted to dissolve itself. Some former party members in the MLP, led by former leading member Joseph Green, have continued work as the Communist Voice Organization.

== See also ==
- U.S. Marxist–Leninist Organization
- New Communist Movement
- List of anti-revisionist groups
