= Dhimitër Stamo =

Albanian diplomat (1931–2006)

Dhimitër Stamo (6 November 1931 – 11 November 2006) was an Albanian diplomat who served as Albanian ambassador to China during the 1980s.

== Mandates ==
He served as the Albanian Ambassador to Romania (1964–1970). Stamo served as Albanian charge d'affairs of Hungary from 1973 to 1975 Stamo served as Albanian Ambassador to China from 1983 to 1986.

== Time in Kampuchea ==
Stamo then transferred to Cambodia as the Albanian Ambassador to Democratic Kampuchea from 1975 to 1978. During this time he took residence in Phnom Penh during the brutal Khmer Rouge regime, which he later documented in his memoirs in Italian, "Tre Anni con i Khmer Rossi" (Three Years with the Khmer Rouge). He was the first European ambassador who personally met all of the Kampuchean leadership: Pol Pot, Khieu Sampham, Ieng Sary, Son Sen, Vorn Vet, So Phim, and Ieng Thirith.
