= Tao Miaofa =

Chinese diplomat

Tao Miaofa (Chinese: 陶苗发) was a Chinese diplomat. He was Ambassador of the People's Republic of China to Albania (1993–1996), Slovakia (1996–1999) and Bulgaria (1999–2003).

Diplomatic posts
| Preceded by Gu Maoxuan | Ambassador of China to Albania; 1993–1996 | Succeeded by Ma Weimao |
| Preceded by | Ambassador of China to Slovakia; 1996–1999 | Succeeded by Yuan Guisen |
| Preceded by Chen Delai | Ambassador of China to Bulgaria; 1999–2003 | Succeeded by Xie Hangsheng |
