= Luo Shigao =

Chinese diplomat

Luo Shigao (Chinese: 罗士高) (1905–1995) was a Chinese diplomat. He was born in Dabu County, Guangdong Province. After the founding of the People's Republic of China, he was made deputy mayor of Chongqing. He served as China's 2nd Ambassador to Albania from 1957 to 1964.

Preceded by Xu Yixin	Ambassador of China to Albania; 1957–1964	Succeeded by Xu Jianguo

== See also ==
- Chongqing Local Chronicles Compilation Committee, General Office of the Chongqing Municipal Government, Chongqing Branch of the Scientific and Technical Literature Publishing House. 1987: p. 18.
