= Ma Weimao =

Chinese diplomat

Ma Weimao (Chinese: 马维茂) is a Chinese diplomat. He was Ambassador of China to Albania from 1996 to 1999.

Diplomatic posts
Preceded by Tao Miaofa	Ambassador of China to Albania; 1996–1999	Succeeded by Zuo Furong
