= Liu Xiao (politician) =

Chinese diplomat

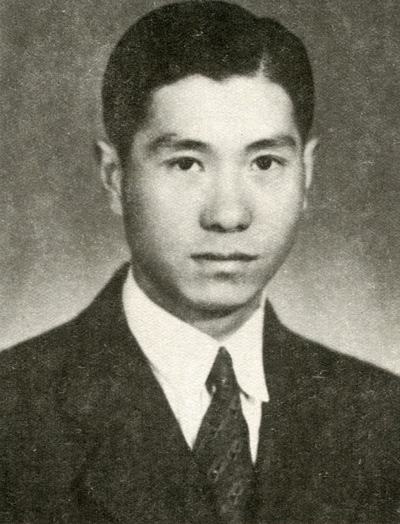
Liu Xiao

Liu Xiao (Chinese: 刘晓; 13 May 1908 – 11 June 1988) was a Chinese diplomat. He was born in Hunan. He joined the Chinese Communist Party in 1926. He was Ambassador of China to the Soviet Union (1955–1962) and Albania (April–September 1967).

Preceded by Zhang Wentian	Ambassador of China to the Soviet Union; 1955–1962	Succeeded by Pan Zili
Preceded by Xu Jianguo	Ambassador of China to Albania; April–September 1967	Succeeded by Geng Biao
