= Liu Xinquan =

Chinese diplomat and general

Liu Xinquan (Chinese: 刘新权) (1916–1994) was a People's Liberation Army major general and Chinese diplomat. He was born in Da County, Sichuan Province (modern Dachuan District, Dazhou). He was Ambassador of China to the Soviet Union (1970–1976) and Albania (1976–1979).

Diplomatic posts
Preceded by Pan Zili	Chinese Ambassador to the Soviet Union; 1970–1976	Succeeded by Wang Youping
Preceded by Liu Zhenhua	Chinese Ambassador to Albania; 1976–1979	Succeeded by Wen Ning
