= Xu Jianguo =

Chinese diplomat

Xu Jianguo (Chinese: 许建国; September 1903 – 4 October 1977) was a Chinese Communist politician, intelligence and security officer, public prosecutor and diplomat. He notably served as director of the Tianjin public security bureau (1949–1952), Chief Prosecutor of the Shanghai People's Prosecuracy and head of political and legal affairs at the East China Bureau of the CCP (1952–1959) and as China's ambassador to Romania (1959–1964) and Albania (1964–1967).

Preceded by	Ambassador of China to Romania; 1959–1964	Succeeded by
Preceded by Luo Shigao	Ambassador of China to Albania; 1964–1967	Succeeded by Liu Xiao
