= Wen Ning =

Chinese diplomat

Wen Ning (Chinese: 温宁) was a Chinese diplomat. He was Ambassador of the People's Republic of China to Albania (1979–1983).

Diplomatic posts
Preceded by Liu Xinquan	Ambassador of China to Albania; 1979–1983	Succeeded by Xi Zhaoming
