= Communist Ghadar Party of India =

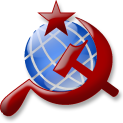
- General Secretary: Lal Singh
- Founded: 25 December 1980
- Headquarters: E-392, Sanjay Colony, Okhla Phase – II, New Delhi 110020
- Newspaper: Mazdoor Ekta Lehar
- Ideology: Communism; Marxism–Leninism; Revolutionary socialism Hoxhaism; Left-wing nationalism Anti-fascism; Anti-revisionism; Historical: Maoism; Naxalism
- Political position: Far-left

Website
- cgpi.org

The Communist Ghadar Party of India is a far-left political party that is committed to a communist revolution in India based on Marxism–Leninism.

== History ==
The party was founded on 25 December 1980, as a continuation of the Hindustani Ghadar Party – Organisation of Indian Marxist–Leninists Abroad founded in Canada in 1970. The group had established a presence in Punjab during the 1970s. Initially the group identified itself with the Naxalite movement in India, especially in Punjab. However, by the end of the 1970s the group rejected the Three Worlds Theory and sided with Albania in the Sino-Albanian split. The name of the party was inspired by the American-based Ghadar Party, formed by Indian revolutionaries in the early 1900s. Ghadar means revolt, a narrative abbreviation referring to Indian Revolt.

The party opposed the policies of the Communist Party of India (CPI) and the Communist Party of India (Marxist) (CPI(M)) at the time, which according to CGPI had both adopted a policy of parliamentarianism and support for the Soviet Union and the Naxalbari were fragmented. The party also adopted a policy of opposing 'national oppression', particularly in Punjab, Kashmir and Manipur and rejected defense of the centralised India state.

In December 1990 they held their first congress where they reflected upon the collapse of the Soviet Union, declaring "we are our own models". They concluded that "it is the workers and peasants, women and youth, organised in their collectives, who should rule". They recognised the communist movement as one, and rejected social-democracy as a compromise between right reaction and revolution and rejecting support for the Indian National Congress party against the Bharatiya Janata Party (BJP).

The Second Congress was held in 1999, and the Third Congress in January 2005. At the latter the Constitution of the Communist Ghadar Party of India was adopted. The Fourth Congress was held in October 2010. 25 December 2010 marked the 30th anniversary of the founding the Party.

The work of CGPI is based on the theoretical thinking of Marxism–Leninism and guided by contemporary Marxist–Leninist thought.

== Publications ==
- Mazdoor Ekta Lehar (MEL) (formerly known as People's Voice in its English version) is the organ of the Central Committee of the Communist Ghadar Party of India (CGPI). MEL is both a news-paper and internet newsletter, which serves as the print vehicle and electronic transmission for the dissemination of information to arm the active vanguard force of Indian communists, activists, journalists and other interested parties.

The party publishes Mazdoor Ekta Lehar in:

- English (formerly People's Voice)
- Hindi
- Punjabi
- Tamil

== See also ==
- Communist Party of India (Maoist)
- Communist Party of the Philippines
- List of anti-revisionist groups
- List of Naxalite and Maoist groups in India
- Shining Path
