= Fan Chengzuo =

Chinese diplomat

Fan Chengzuo (Chinese: 范承祚) was a Chinese diplomat. He was Ambassador of the People's Republic of China to Albania (1986–1989).

Diplomatic posts
Preceded by Xi Zhaoming	Ambassador of China to Albania; 1986–1989	Succeeded by Gu Maoxuan
