= Gu Maoxuan =

Chinese diplomat

Gu Maoxuan (Chinese: 顾懋萱) was a Chinese diplomat. He was Ambassador of the People's Republic of China to Albania (1989–1992).

Diplomatic posts
Preceded by Fan Chengzuo	Ambassador of China to Albania; 1989–1992	Succeeded by Tao Miaofa
