= Communist Party USA (Marxist–Leninist) =

Defunct American political party

Communist Party USA (Marxist-Leninist)
- General Secretary: Michael Laski
- Founder: Michael Laski
- Founded: 1965
- Split from: Provisional Organizing Committee to Reconstitute a Marxist–Leninist Party (POC)
- Succeeded by: Proletarian Revolutionary Party
- Ideology: Marxism-Leninism; Maoism

The Communist Party USA (Marxist–Leninist) was a small American Maoist group founded in 1965 by Los Angeles members of the Provisional Organizing Committee to Reconstitute a Marxist–Leninist Party (POC) around Michael Laski. Laski stated in a 1968 interview that this split was motivated by dissatisfaction with the POC's response to the Watts riots.

== History ==
In 1967 Detective James C. Harris of the Los Angeles district attorney's office testified before the House Un-American Activities Committee about the group. He stated that the "intent of the CPUSA-ML has been to aggravate" the African-American population in Los Angeles "to the point of civil disobedience and to attempt to condition their minds to respond in a rebellious way in the event of a contact with a police officer."

General Secretary Laski was expelled after gambling away nearly all of the party's funds in Nevada in an attempt to raise more funds. After the expulsion, two groups existed with the name Communist Party USA (Marxist–Leninist), one led by Arnold Hoffman, which continued to publish People's Voice; and one led by Laski, which started a new paper, The New Worker. In 1969, the Laski group merged with the Proletarian Revolutionary Party led by Jonathan Leake.

Laski was the subject of a 1967 essay by Joan Didion (later collected in Slouching Towards Bethlehem), entitled "Comrade Laski, C.P.U.S.A. (M.-L.)." She described him as having constructed a personal world "of labyrinthine intricacy and immaculate clarity, a world made meaningful not only by high purpose but by external and internal threats, intrigues and apparatus, an immutably ordered world in which things mattered."
