= One Line, One Large Area =

Chinese diplomatic slogan

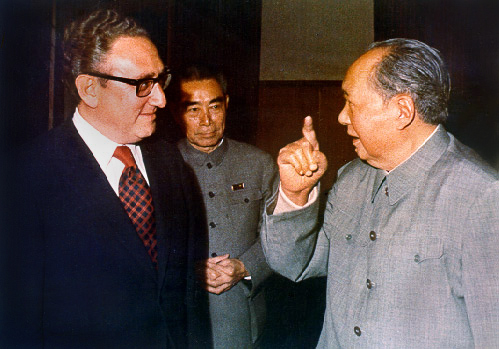
In 1973, when Mao Zedong met with United States presidential envoy Henry Kissinger, he proposed the "one-line" diplomatic strategy

One Line, One Large Area (Chinese: 一条线、一大片; pinyin: Yītiáo xiàn, yī dàpiàn) was a diplomatic strategy of the People's Republic of China from the early 1970s to the early 1980s. It was mainly proposed after the Sino-Soviet split, in response to the threat from the Soviet Union in the north. After this diplomatic strategy was put forward, China's foreign policy shifted from "anti-Soviet and anti-American" to "pro-American and anti-Soviet".

== Background ==
=== China's diplomacy and its surrounding situation ===
In the 1960s, Sino-Soviet relations deteriorated, and in 1969, the Zhenbao Island armed conflict broke out on the Sino-Soviet border, putting the two countries at the brink of a full-scale war. Against the backdrop of China's economic and military strength being far inferior to that of the Soviet Union, China's northern security faced a serious threat from the Soviet Union. At that time, Chinese leader Mao Zedong believed that "China's biggest problem is the Soviet Union, not the United States," and began to think about "using the United States as a card to deal with the Soviet Union". He gradually began to ease relations with the United States, and in 1972, Mao Zedong met with US president Richard Nixon.

=== United States diplomacy ===
Meanwhile, the United States was at a disadvantage in the Cold War. On the one hand, Soviet leaders actively pursued a global hegemonic strategy that posed a great "threat" to the United States. On the other hand, the United States itself was mired in the Vietnam War and its domestic economy was also affected by the economic crisis. The United States began to reassess its policy toward China.

== History ==
In 1973, Mao Zedong met with US president's special envoy Henry Kissinger and proposed a "one-line" diplomatic strategy to him. Mao Zedong said: "I said we should form a horizontal line, which is latitude, the United States, Japan, China, Pakistan, Iran, Turkey, and Europe." The so-called "one-line" diplomatic strategy was to unite the countries along this line from China and Japan through Pakistan, Iran, Turkey to Europe and then to the United States to resist the Soviet Union and form an international anti-hegemonic united front. In 1974, when Mao Zedong met with Japanese foreign minister Masayoshi Ohira in Beijing, he proposed a "large area" diplomatic concept, which mainly aimed to "unite all available forces in the country, including the United States and Japan, to jointly deal with the expansionist momentum of the Soviet Union. It can be seen that the purpose of all the surrounding countries in the "large area" and "one line" pointed out by Mao Zedong was to unite them to jointly deal with the Soviet Union.

== Aftermath ==
Under the guidance of the "one line, one area" diplomatic strategy, China gradually cooperated with the United States to jointly confront the Soviet Union starting in the 1970s, establishing an international anti-hegemonic united front that included the United States, Japan, and Europe. This effectively contained the Soviet Union's border threats against China and helped China escape its international isolation since the 1960s. The "one line, one area" strategy was maintained from the early 1970s until the 12th National Congress of the Chinese Communist Party in 1982, which formally established a new foreign policy, namely "independent and self-reliant foreign policy." From then on, the "one line, one area" strategy was gradually replaced by the "independent and self-reliant" diplomatic strategy.
