= Hoxhaism =

Variant of Marxism–Leninism

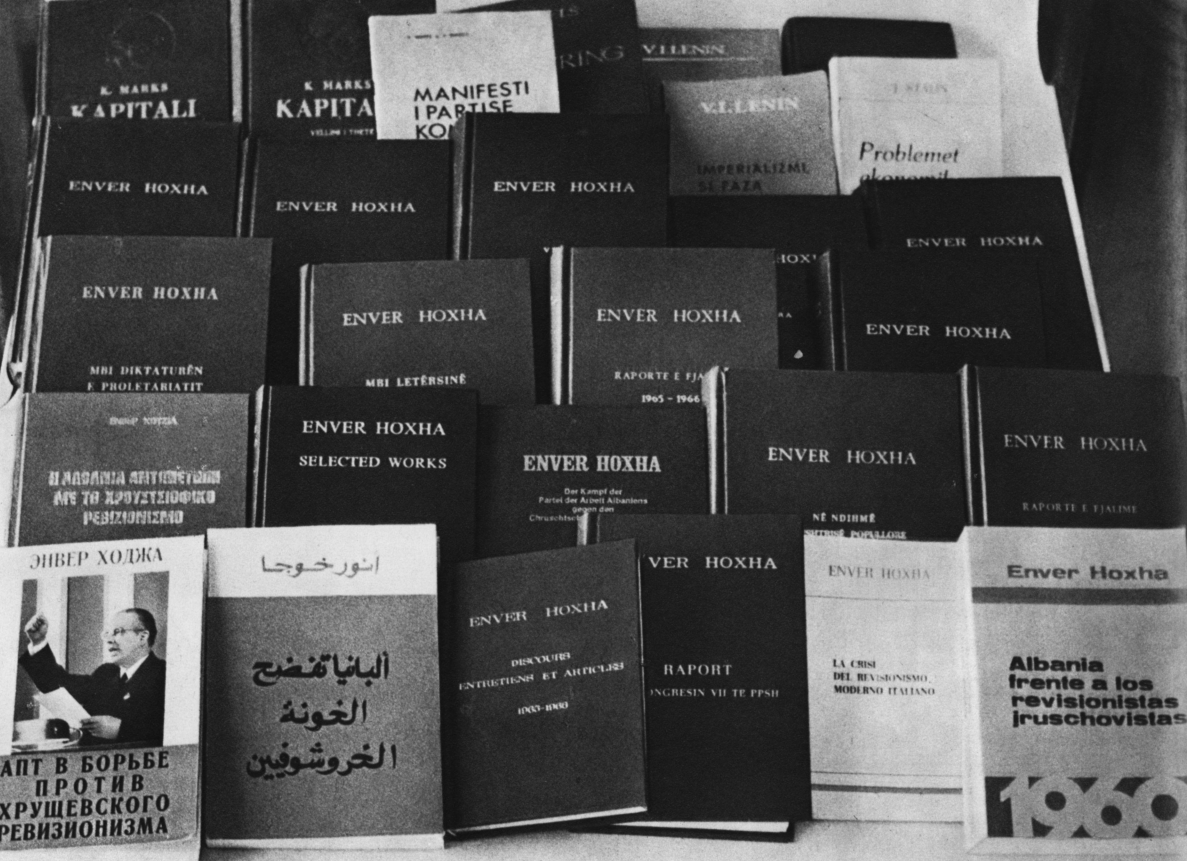
Translated works of Enver Hoxha, for whom the ideology is named.

Hoxhaism (UK: /ˈhɒdʒə.ɪzəm/ HOJ-ə-iz-əm, US: /ˈhɔːdʒ-/ HAWJ-) is a variant of Marxism–Leninism developed in the late 1970s as a result of a schism in the anti-revisionist movement, namely between the Chinese Communist Party and the Party of Labour of Albania. The ideological dispute between the two parties brought about the Sino-Albanian split. The ideology is named after Enver Hoxha, the first secretary of the Party of Labour from 1941 to his death in 1985 and leader of the People's Socialist Republic of Albania from 1944 to his death in 1985.

The term Hoxhaism is rarely used by the organizations associated with it, as they view Hoxha's theoretical contributions to Marxism–Leninism as an augmentation of anti-revisionism rather than a distinct ideology. Hoxhaists typically identify themselves with Marxism–Leninism or Stalinism.

== Overview ==
Hoxhaism demarcates itself by a strict defense of the legacy of Joseph Stalin, the organization of the Soviet Union under Stalin, and fierce criticism of virtually all other communist groupings as revisionist. Currents such as Eurocommunism are regarded as anti-communist movements.

Hoxha was critical of the United States and Yugoslavia, condemning the latter as social imperialist. After the death of Stalin and the Sino-Albanian split, he extended his social imperialist critique to the Soviet Union and China. Hoxha condemned the Warsaw Pact invasion of Czechoslovakia in 1968, before withdrawing Albania from the Warsaw Pact in response. Hoxhaism asserts the right of nations to pursue socialism by different paths dictated by the conditions in those countries, although Hoxha personally held the view that Titoism was "anti-Marxist" in overall practice.

Following the fall of communism in Albania in 1991, Hoxhaist parties formed the International Conference of Marxist–Leninist Parties and Organizations (Unity & Struggle) in 1994, and its publication Unity and Struggle.

== Affiliated groups and parties ==
The Communist Party of Brazil was Hoxhaist, as was the Tigray People's Liberation Front until 1991, when the Albanian Workers' Party was dissolved. In Nicaragua, the Marxist–Leninist Popular Action Movement split from the Sandinista National Liberation Front over differences in the Sino-Soviet split, and the group eventually adopted Hoxhaism after the Sino-Albanian split. The People's Movement of Kosovo remained Hoxhaist until 1990, and was active in a region long claimed by Hoxha to be part of Albania. The Communist Party of Germany/Marxists–Leninists was an anti-revisionist political party active in East Germany that closely followed the ideals of Hoxhaism following the Sino-Albanian split in 1978. In India, there have been two minor political parties affiliated to Hoxhaism, one of them being a Naxalite group called the Unity Centre of Communist Revolutionaries of India (Marxist–Leninist) (Harbhajan Sohi) established in 1979 over conflicts with the mainstream Naxalite movement over the Sino-Albanian split, and the other being the anti-revisionist Communist Ghadar Party of India, which is a legal political aprty. The Communist Party of Albania and the Reorganised Party of Labour of Albania are the two main communist political parties in post-communist Albania to carry forward the ideals of Enver Hoxha. The CPA had supported student protests in Albania against the government of Edi Rama in 2026. The Revolutionary Communist Party of Britain (Marxist–Leninist) follows Hoxhaism and its theory. Due to regional proximity, Hoxhaism gained support in Turkey, as shown in the Hoxhaist ideology of the Revolutionary Communist Party of Britain (Marxist–Leninist) and the Revolutionary Communist Party of Turkey. Hoxhaist line of thought in the United States is practicsed by two defunct political parties, the first one being the American Party of Labor, led by Jack Shulman, and the other being the former Marxist–Leninist Party, USA, which also replaced Maoism with Hoxhaism following the Sino-Albanian split.
