= Elections in Albania =

Elections in Albania consist of parliamentary elections and local elections for the mayors and municipal councils of Albania's 61 municipalities; they are mandated by the Constitution and legislation enacted by Parliament and operated by the Central Election Commission (KQZ). The Parliament (Kuvendi) has 140 members elected for four-year terms. The president is elected by parliament.

The Electoral Code (Albanian: Kodi Zgjedhor) is the primary law regulating both elections and referendums. It is adopted and amended by the parliament with a three-fifths supermajority. For general (parliamentary) elections, legislation currently makes provision for proportional representation with partially open lists. A national electoral threshold of 1% is applied. For the first time in 2025, the diaspora residing outside of Albania were allowed to vote by mail.

Albania has a multi-party system, with two or three strong parties and several other parties that are electorally successful. According to international observers, vote buying and institutional influence, among others, persist as problems in Albanian elections, despite improvements over the years.

== Current Electoral Code (2024) ==
On 26 July 2024, the Parliament of Albania approved a set of amendments to the country's Electoral Code, which were implemented in the 2025 parliamentary elections. The amendments were passed with 106 votes in favor, 2 against, and no abstentions, during the final session of the 2021–2025 legislature.

=== Mixed Electoral Lists ===
The reform introduced a hybrid electoral system combining closed and open lists:

- One-third (1/3) of each party’s candidate list will be closed—determined solely by party leadership and not subject to preferential voting.
- Two-thirds (2/3) of the list will be open, allowing voters to cast preferential votes for individual candidates.
- Parties are required to submit two separate lists to the Central Election Commission (CEC): a fixed list and an open list.

=== Diaspora Voting ===
For the first time, Albanian citizens residing abroad will be able to participate in parliamentary elections:

- Voting will take place by mail.
- Eligible voters must register electronically with the CEC and provide documentation confirming their residence outside Albania. They will be deregistered from the normal voting registry and added in another diaspora list.
- Returned ballots must arrive at the CEC no later than the close of polls on election day and will be counted toward the voter’s last place of residence in Albania.

=== Gender Quota ===
The amendments also reinforced gender representation rules:

- At least one in every three elected candidates must belong to the less-represented gender.
- This requirement applies to both the closed and open portions of the candidate lists.
- If the results of preferential voting do not meet the gender quota, candidate rankings may be adjusted during the mandate allocation process to ensure compliance.

=== Seat Distribution ===
The country is divided into 12 multi-member constituencies, corresponding to its administrative regions. Seats are allocated using the D'Hondt method, a highest averages method for allocating seats proportionally among party lists.

The D'Hondt method operates by dividing the number of votes each party receives by a series of divisors (1, 2, 3, etc.) to allocate seats in each constituency. While this system aims to reflect the proportion of votes received, it can result in a higher threshold for smaller parties to gain representation, especially in constituencies with fewer seats.

The 2024 amendments established a national electoral threshold of 1% for political parties to gain representation in the parliament, reducing it from a previous 3% for parties and 5% for coalitions. This means that political parties must secure at least 1% of the total national vote to be eligible for seat allocation. This adjustment aimed to enhance the inclusivity of the electoral system, allowing smaller parties a better chance to enter parliament.

=== Legal Challenge and Criticism ===
In May 2025, a group of smaller opposition parties filed a case with the Constitutional Court of Albania, challenging the constitutionality of the one-third closed list provision. They argued that the reform restricts electoral competitiveness and consolidates power within party leadership structures, allegedly violating constitutional guarantees of equal electoral participation.

Compared to the 2021 parliamentary elections, where only 3 out of 140 MPs were elected through preferential voting, the new system places an estimated 40 mandates (approximately 29% of total seats) in direct competition among candidates. However, in practice, the open list system primarily applies with larger parties.

Only parties that secure enough votes to elect more than one-third of their candidate list can effectively utilize the open list mechanism. This scenario predominantly applies to the ruling Socialist Party (PS) and, to a lesser extent, the main opposition Democratic Party (PD). Smaller parties do not meet this threshold, rendering the open list provision redundant for them. Some smaller parties are trying to sidestep this limitation by having only placeholder candidates in the closed lists who will resign their seats when elected, to pave the way for the open list candidates.

== History ==
On 31 March 1991, the first pluralist elections were held in the country. The elections were conducted with a clean majority system in 250 constituencies. 98.2% of voters took part in the voting. The participating parties registered a total of 1,074 candidates while 17 of the candidates were independent. The final election results declared the Labor Party the winner with 56.17% of the vote. The Democratic Party won 38.71% of the vote, the Republican Party 1.77%, the Omonia Organization 0.73%, the Agrarian Party 0.07% and the Veterans Committee 0.28%. With a 250-seat parliament, the results were translated into 169 deputies for the Labor Party, the Democratic Party 75 deputies, Omonia 5 deputies and the Veterans Committee 1 deputy. The Democratic Party achieved high results and received a larger number of deputies compared to the Labor Party in the main cities such as: Durrës (13 deputies out of 19 in total), Shkodër (16 out of 19 in total), Tirana (19 out of 29). Whereas in Krujë and Vlorë the number of deputies of the two major parties was equal. This was considered a great victory for the DP given that the communist party that had ruled the country for about 50 years still continued to have strong control over the population, especially in those living in rural areas and still doubting that the dictatorship would fall.

On 8 May 2000, the Albanian Parliament approved the Electoral Code only with the votes of the Socialists, which had an overwhelming majority in the assembly that emerged from the 1997 elections. The Democratic Party rejected the Electoral Code in its entirety due to the composition of the Central Election Commission (KQZ or CEC) of 6 members. They boycotted his approval in parliament even though he had attended most of the roundtables organized for the debate over the Electoral Code. According to the new Electoral Code, voting in Albania would be based on a mixed, majority-proportional electoral system. From where 100 deputies, in the 140-seat parliament, would be elected by majority vote from single-member constituencies, while 40 seats were filled by national multi-member lists of political parties in order to achieve a proportional approach between nationally received votes and deputies which represented a political party in the assembly. To win a proportional mandate, political parties had to cross the 2.5% electoral threshold, while coalitions had to cross the 4% threshold.

== Presidential elections ==
The election of the president of Albania is regulated by the constitution of Albania, particularly outlined in the fourth part, comprising articles 86 to 94. To be eligible for candidacy, individuals must fulfill several criteria as delineated in the constitution: they must be Albanian citizens by birth, have resided in Albania for no less than the past 10 years, be at least 40 years of age, and possess the right to vote. The constitution mandates that the president shall not occupy any other public office, be affiliated with any political party, or engage in private business activities. The electoral process commences with the parliament of Albania, which is responsible for scheduling elections at least 30 days prior to the expiration of the incumbent term of the president. Candidates are nominated through a formal process in which a group of at least 20 members of the total 140 members of the parliament may propose an individual for the presidency.

The election is conducted by the parliament through a secret ballot without debate, requiring a candidate to secure a majority of three-fifths of all members of the parliament. If this majority is not achieved in the first ballot, a second ballot is held within seven days, followed by a third ballot if necessary. If no candidate receives the required majority after the third ballot, a fourth ballot occurs within seven days, limited to the two candidates with the highest votes from the previous round. If neither candidate secures the necessary majority in the fourth ballot, a fifth ballot is conducted. If, after the fifth ballot, neither candidate achieves the required majority, the parliament is dissolved, necessitating subsequent parliamentary elections within 60 days. The successive elected parliament is then responsible for electing the president according to the procedures regulated in the constitution. Further, if the parliament fails to elect a president, it correspondingly will be dissolved, requiring another round of general elections within the same period.

The president begins their duties after taking an oath before the parliament, affirming their commitment to uphold the constitution and laws of Albania, respect the rights and freedoms of citizens, protect the independence of the nation, and serve the general interest and progress of the Albanians. The term of office for the president is defined at five years, with the possibility of re-election for a maximum of two consecutive terms. In the event that a president resigns before the end of their term, they are prohibited from being a candidate in the subsequent presidential election. When the president is temporarily unable to exercise their functions or if the office becomes vacant, the speaker of the parliament of Albania assumes the responsibilities of the president. If the president is unable to fulfill their duties for more than 60 days, the parliament must decide, by a two-thirds majority, whether to refer the issue to the constitutional court. The court determines the incapacity of the president, and if incapacity is confirmed, the election of a successive president must commence within 10 days of such determination.

=== Latest election ===
Results of the 2022 Albanian presidential election
Candidate	Party (Note: In accordance with Article 89 of the Albanian constitution, which was enacted in 1998, the president is prohibited from maintaining affiliation with any political party. Consequently, the individual elected to the presidency is required to renounce their party affiliations for the duration of their presidential term.)	First round		Second round		Third round		Fourth round	
Candidate	Party	Votes	%	Votes	%	Votes	%	Votes	%
Bajram Begaj	Independent	No candidates						78	95.12
Against		No candidates						4	4.88
Required majority		84 votes						71 votes	
Valid votes		—						82	98.8
Abstentions		—						1	1.2
Total								83	100
Absents		—						57	40.71
Registered voters		—						140	59.29

=== Previous elections ===
Election	Candidates	Winning candidate		Party		
Election	Candidates	1925	1	Party	Ahmet Zogu	Progressive Party
1991	1		Ramiz Alia	Party of Labor		
1992	1		Sali Berisha	Democratic Party		
2002	1		Alfred Moisiu	Independent		
2007	3		Bamir Topi	Democratic Party		
2012	7		Bujar Nishani	Democratic Party		
2017	1		Ilir Meta	LSI		
2022	1		Bajram Begaj	Independent		

== Parliamentary elections ==
=== Latest election ===
Party	Votes	%	Seats	+/–
Socialist Party of Albania	856,177	53.27	83	+9
Democratic Party – Alliance for a Greater Albania (Note: Of the 50 seats won by the alliance, the Democratic Party took 41, the Freedom Party 4, the Party for Justice, Integration and Unity 2 and the Republican Party, Environmentalist Agrarian Party and Unity for Human Rights Party took one seat each.)	529,354	32.93	50	–13
Albania Becomes Initiative (LSHB–NTH–LDPSH) (Note: The alliance's single seat was taken by Lëvizja Shqipëria Bëhet)	64,264	4.00	1	New
Social Democratic Party of Albania	49,890	3.10	3	0
Opportunity Party	48,995	3.05	2	New
Lëvizja Bashkë	24,616	1.53	1	New
Euroatlantic Democrats	20,863	1.30	0	New
Djathtas për Zhvillim (DJATHTAS–LZHK)	6,019	0.37	0	–1
Albanian National Alliance	3,787	0.24	0	New
Homeland Movement	2,255	0.14	0	New
New Democracy Alliance Party	1,127	0.07	0	0
Total	1,607,347	100.00	140	0
Valid votes	1,607,347	96.54		
Invalid/blank votes	57,526	3.46		
Total votes	1,664,873	100.00		
Registered voters/turnout	3,713,897	44.83		
Source: KQZ

=== List ===
This is a list of parliamentary elections in Albania from the year 1921 till present day. Direct presidential elections have not been held.

No.	Legislature	Date	Candidates	Registered voters	Turnout %
1	National Council	5 April 1921	65		
2	Constitutional Assembly	27 December 1923	95		
3	Deputies Chamber - Senate	17 May 1925	49/16		
4	Constituent Assembly/Parliament	17 August 1928	49		
5	Parliament	11 November 1932	54		
6	Parliament	31 January 1937	57		
7	National Assembly/Parliament	1 October 1943	193		
8	Constitutional Assembly/People's Assembly	2 December 1945	101	603,566	89.9
9	People's Assembly	28 May 1950	116	641,241	99.4
10	People's Assembly	30 May 1954	129	702,476	99.9
11	People's Assembly	1 June 1958	180	788,250	100
12	People's Assembly	3 June 1962	210	889,875	100
13	People's Assembly	10 July 1966	234	978,161	100
14	People's Assembly	20 September 1970	261	1,097,123	100
15	People's Assembly	6 October 1974	238	1,248,530	100
16	People's Assembly	12 November 1978	250	1,436,289	100
17	People's Assembly	14 November 1982	250	1,627,968	100
18	People's Assembly	1 February 1987	250	1,830,653	100
19	Constitutional Assembly	31 March 1991	250	1,977,516	98.6
20	People's Assembly	22 March 1992	130	2,021,169	90.4
21	People's Assembly	26 May 1996	140	2,204,002	89.1
22	Assembly	29 June 1997	150	1,947,235	72.6
23	Assembly	24 June 2001	135	2,499,238	53.6
24	Assembly	3 July 2005	140	2,850,821	48.0
25	Assembly	28 June 2009	140	3,084,946	50.8
26	Assembly	23 June 2013	140	3,271,885	53.5
27	Assembly	25 June 2017	140	3,452,324	46.8
28	Assembly	25 April 2021	140	3,588,869	46.3
29	Assembly	11 May 2025	140	3,713,897	44.8

== Local elections ==
The candidates column lists only the number of candidates for mayor of the municipality. It does not include candidates for member of the municipal council.

No.	Date	Candidates	Registered voters	Turnout %
1	26 July 1992	357	1,988,795	70.7
2	20, 27 October 1996	357		58.5
3	1, 15 October 2000	374	2,329,639	50.7
4	12 October 2003	373	2,703,608	45.7
5	18 February 2007	373	2,929,293	46.3
6	8 May 2011	373	3,166,279	50.9
7	21 June 2015	61	3,372,471	47.3
8	30 June 2019	61	812,249	22.9
9	14 May 2023	61	1,395,627	38.23
Partial elections were held on 1 September and 3 November 2013, 25 June 2017, 9 November 2025

== See also ==
- Electoral calendar
- Electoral system
