= Gjela Biba =

Albanian politician

Deputy Chairperson of the People's Assembly

Personal details
- Political party: Albanian Workers' Party

Gjela Marku Biba was a politician in the People's Socialist Republic of Albania. In 1982 she became Deputy Chairperson of the People's Assembly.

Biba was a member of the ruling single party, the Albanian Workers' Party (AWP). In June 1978 she became a member of the AWP Central Committee. She became Deputy Chairperson of the Albanian Democratic Front in 1979. In the 1982 Albanian parliamentary election she became Deputy for the Mirditë constituency district, and deputy chairperson of the People's Assembly. In May 1983 she became First Secretary of the AWP Committee for Mirditë District.
