= 1991 Albanian parliamentary election =

- 31 March 1991 (first round); 7 April 1991 (second round); 14 April 1991 (third round)
- All 250 seats to the People's Assembly
- Turnout: 98.66% (▼1.34pp)
Party	Leader	Vote %	Seats	+/–
PPSh	Ramiz Alia	56.17	169	−81
PD	Sali Berisha	38.71	75	New
Omonoia	Vasil Bollano	0.73	5	New
KKVLAPSH	Rustem Peçi	0.28	1	New
This lists parties that won seats. See the complete results below.
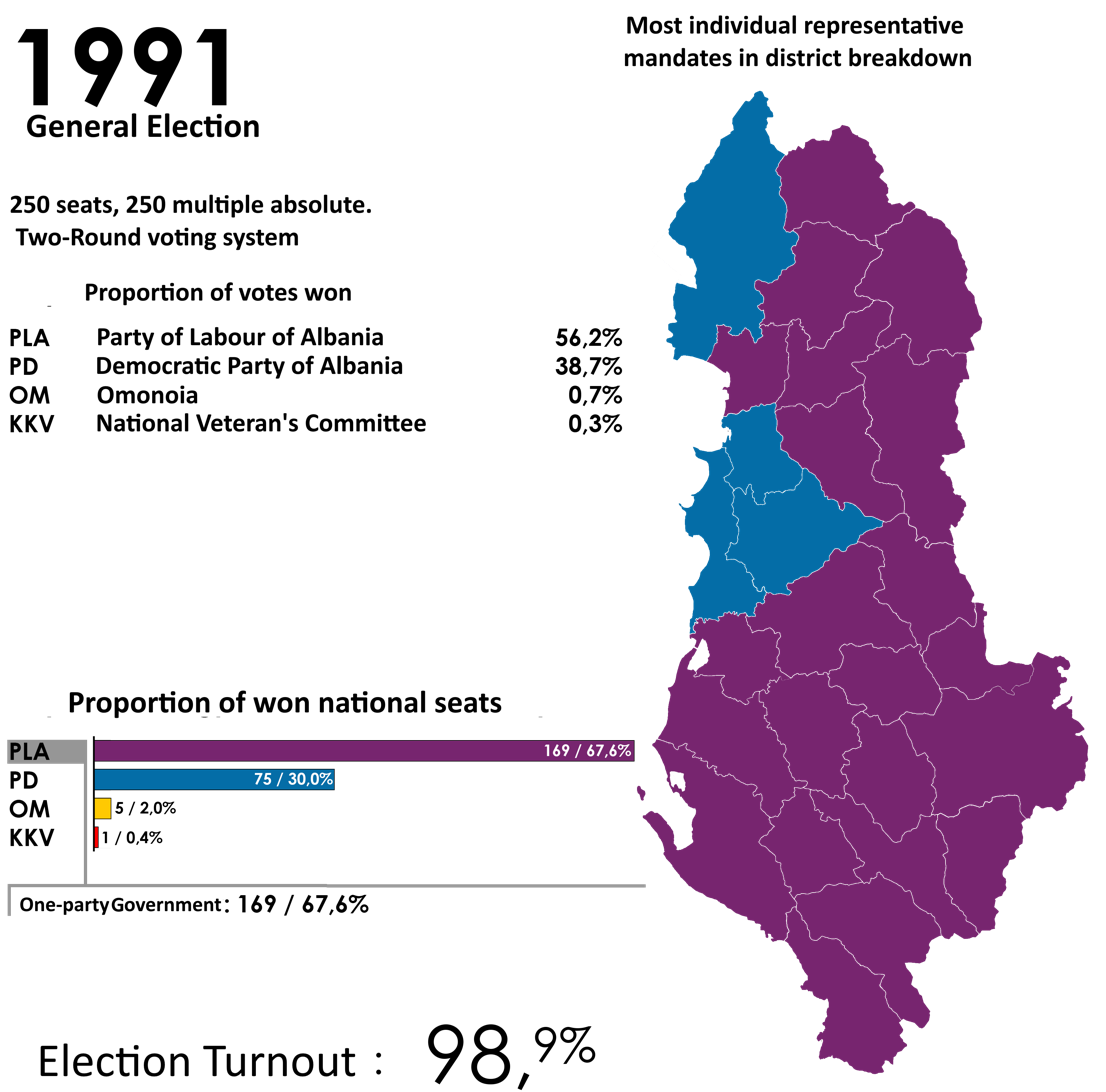
Prime Minister before	Prime Minister after
Fatos Nano; PPSh	Fatos Nano; PPSh

Parliamentary elections were held in Albania on 31 March 1991 to elect the 250 representatives of the People's Assembly. A second round was held on 7 April and a third round on 14 April. The elections represented a critical juncture in Albania's political evolution, transitioning from one party system to a multi-party liberal democratic system. Following the death of Enver Hoxha in 1985, his successor, Ramiz Alia encountered escalating economic difficulties and social unrest, which were intensified by the broader geopolitical transformations occurring during the Revolutions of 1989. The foundation of the Democratic Party in December 1990 served as a catalyst for legislative reforms aimed at dismantling the People's Socialist Republic.

The elections had a voter turnout of 99%, with 1,951,004 ballots cast to elect the representatives from 250 designated electoral districts. The ruling Party of Labour received 56% of the vote in the first round, going on to win 169 seats and securing the two-thirds majority necessary for constitutional amendments, while the Democratic Party garnered significant support, especially in urban areas. The electoral process comprised six recognised parties, including the Agrarian Party and Republican Party, along with various independent candidates, between democratic aspirations and residual communist elements. Tensions were heightened in the lead-up to the elections, as the Democrats organised several demonstrations demanding electoral integrity. Post-election, violent protests erupted in Shkodër, triggered by the unexpected electoral outcomes, resulting in significant civil unrest and fatalities, which underscored the prevailing political instability.

The inaugural session of the People's Assembly on 10 April 1991, was boycotted by Democrats in response to perceived governmental inadequacies in addressing the unrest. Subsequently, on 29 April, the parliament enacted a constitutional law establishing the Republic of Albania, which facilitated Alia's election as the second president of Albania.

== Background ==
Following the conclusion of World War II, Albania was transformed into a communist state under the leadership of Enver Hoxha. His regime exhibited a strict adherence to Marxist-Leninist ideology and intense nationalism that emphasized self-reliance and isolationism. Hoxha implemented agrarian reforms, nationalized the industry, and established a Stalinist command economy. These measures resulted in remarkable social changes, particularly in education and healthcare; however, pervasive state control led to the repression of political dissent, the suppression of civil liberties, and widespread human rights violations. The regime's isolationist policies rendered Albania increasingly detached from the international community. After a split with the Soviet Union in the early 1960s due to ideological differences, Albania sought assistance from China, while maintaining a non-aligned stance during the Cold War. This dependence on external powers further entrenched totalitarianism and suppressed potential reforms or liberalization. After Hoxha's death in 1985, Ramiz Alia succeeded him as the leader of the Party of Labour. His leadership, marked by a gradual recognition of the necessity for reform, remained constrained by the party's adherence to Marxist-Leninist principles. In the late 1980s, escalating economic difficulties, exacerbated by systemic inefficiencies and international isolation, began to undermine the ruling party's legitimacy. As the Eastern European landscape shifted with the Revolutions of 1989 in neighboring countries, public discontent in Albania intensified, leading to widespread student protests and demands for change.

=== Implementation of multi-party system ===
On 12 December 1990 a coalition of students and intellectuals, including notable figures such as Sali Berisha, Neritan Ceka, Azem Hajdari, Arben Imami, Aleksandër Meksi and Gramoz Pashko, founded the Democratic Party, marking the emergence of the first independent opposition party in Albania. Subsequently, the Presidium of the People's Assembly approved Decree No. 7443 on 18 December, establishing a multi-party system in the nation. This led to the formation of several political parties, including the Democratic Party, which became the largest opposition party, representing the younger generation with a nationwide presence in both northern and southern Albania. The Republican Party, established in January 1991, primarily comprised urban intellectuals, focusing mainly on the southern regions. The Agrarian Party, founded in Vlorë in February 1991, dedicated itself to rural issues and rapidly grew in membership, while the Ecology Party, the smallest of the new parties, emerged in January 1991, influenced by the European green movement but primarily active in Elbasan and Lushnjë. The Democrats organised mass meetings and demonstrations aimed at dismantling symbols of the communist regime. On 21 February 1991, approximately 100,000 individuals gathered at the Skanderbeg Square in Tirana, where they toppled Hoxha's statue. This act was emblematic of the broader democratic revolution, as similar demolitions occurred across the country, and Hoxha's books were publicly burned. The destruction of his monument designated not only the rejection of his authoritarian rule but also the culmination of the collective desire for political change and the end of the communist regime in the nation.

== Electoral system ==
The 250 members of the People's Assembly were elected from single-member constituencies. Candidates were mandated to secure a majority of 50% plus one vote to be elected to the parliament. If two candidates received over 25% but less than 50% of the votes, a runoff election was conducted on 7 April. If no candidate or only one candidate achieved at least 25%, parties were allowed to nominate additional candidates for elections scheduled on 14 April. The electoral process was overseen by three commissions, with the Central Election Commission (KQZ), chaired by Rexhep Meidani, assuming the most remarkable responsibility. The KQZ interpreted and implemented electoral laws, addressed grievances from opposition parties, and registered elected officials. Zone election commissions and local polling station commissions ensured compliance with these laws within their districts, managing candidate registration, vote counting, issuing election certificates, resolving complaints, and reporting final vote totals to the KQZ. Each district served approximately 12,000 to 13,000 residents, equating to about 7,000 to 8,000 eligible voters. To facilitate the voting process, 5,450 voting stations were formed across Albania, each designed to accommodate between 100 and 600 registered voters. These voting stations were responsible for ensuring adherence to electoral laws, counting votes, and reporting results to the respective zone commissions.

=== Election date ===
On 18 December 1990, the People's Assembly promulgated a decree to implement a multi-party system in response to advancing tensions from various factions. Elections were scheduled for 10 February 1991 but the opposition parties, particularly the Democratic Party, criticised this timeline and requested a postponement until May to enhance campaign preparations and amend the electoral law. First dismissive of these requests, the People's Assembly faced escalated tensions as the Democrats organised remarkable public protests and launched an independent press, coupled with threats to boycott the elections. Due to advancing tension, notably following a miners' strike that heightened demands for the postponement of elections, the government implemented the release of a remarkable number of political prisoners and subsequently adjusted the election date to March. This decision, communicated on 16 January, resulted from negotiations between Alia and Berisha, during which the Democratic Party advocated for the formation of an independent opposition press, the release of all prisoners, and amendments to the electoral law to ensure opposition representation in election commissions. The government conceded to many of these demands, facilitating elections scheduled for 31 March.

== Participating parties ==
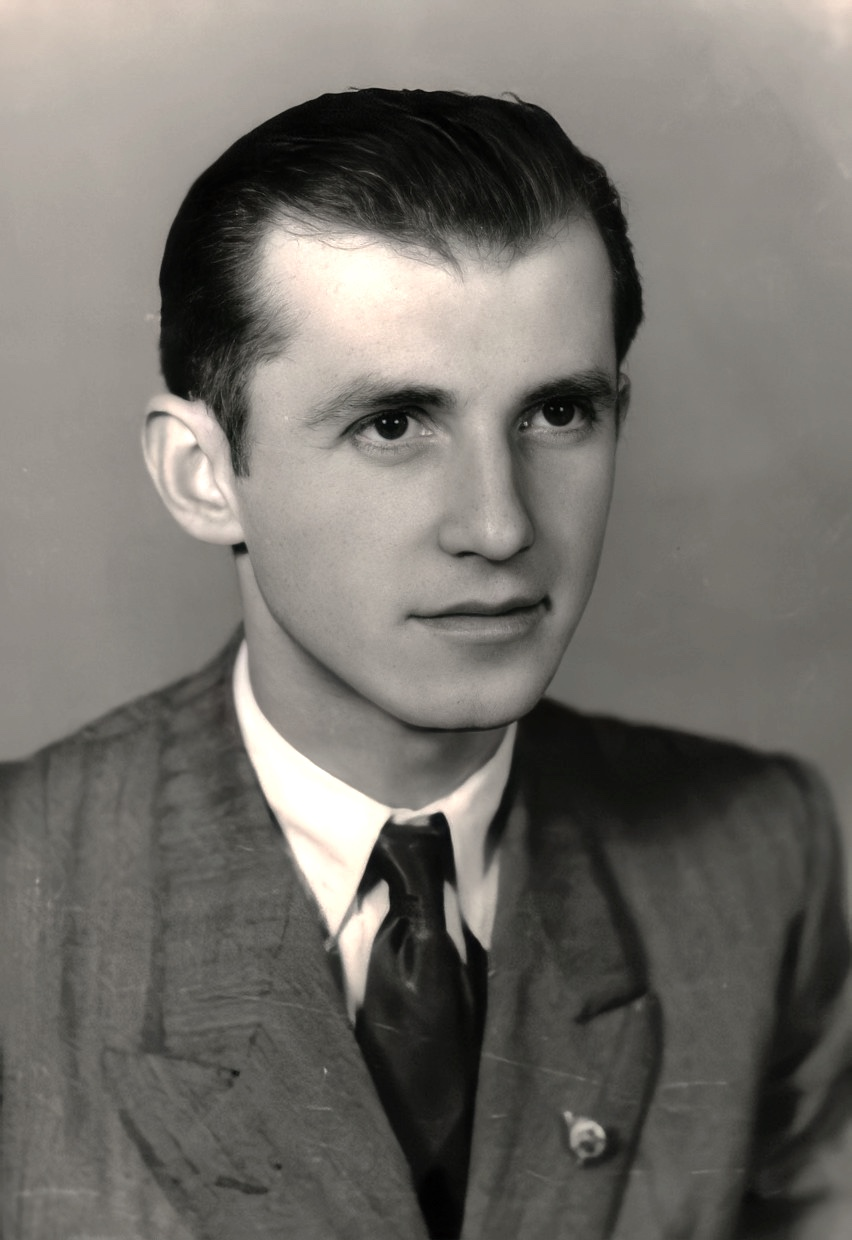
Ramiz Alia of the Party of Labour

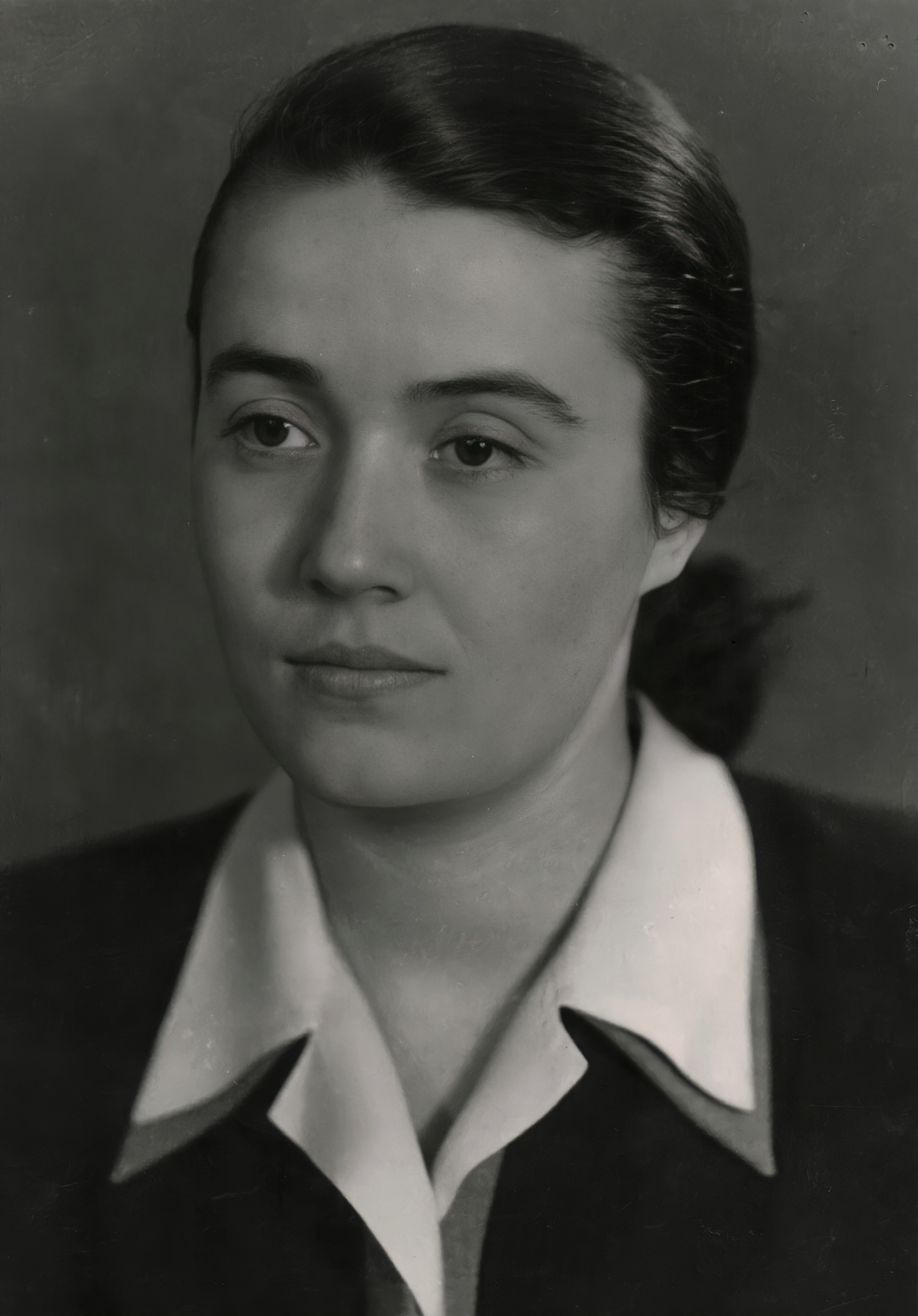
Nexhmije Hoxha of the Democratic Front

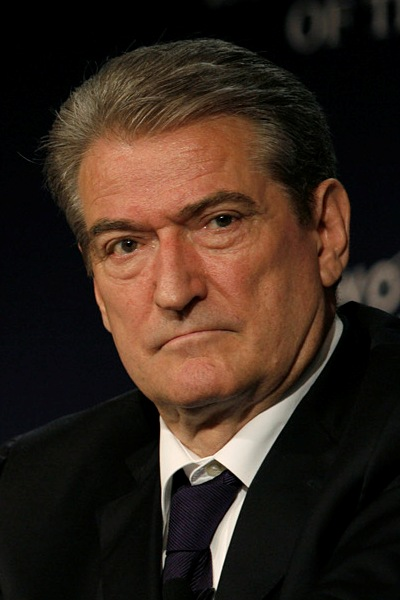
Sali Berisha of the Democratic Party

The 1991 elections were characterised by the participation of multiple political entities, comprising six recognised parties and five additional organisations, which encompessed the ruling party, front organisations, and opposition parties. The ruling Party of Labour maintained an authoritarian stance despite political changes. Key front organisations, such as the Democratic Front, the Union of Women, the Union of Youth, the Trade Unions, and the Veteran's Committee, previously facilitated the dissemination of Party of Labour ideology and mobilised support for the regime. Their candidates often appeared on ballots under various endorsements, reinforcing the perception of their role as extensions of the ruling party. The opposition parties comprised the Democratic Party, the Republican Party, the Agrarian Party, the Ecology Party, and Omonia, which represented the Greek minority in Albania. The Democratic Party emerged as the leading opposition force, emphasising democratic governance, economic reform, and integration with Western institutions. They employed symbolic gestures, notably the V sign, to display its commitment to democratic transformation.

Despite their differing platforms, both the ruling party and opposition parties committed to political, economic, and social reform, endorsing democratic principles, human rights, a market economy, and the rule of law. A shared aspiration for Kosovo reunification existed, although strategies for achieving this goal varied pronouncedly. The Republicans positioned themselves as a moderate alternative, advocating for a gradual transition to a market economy and cautious privatisation, arguing that the Albanians were unprepared for abrupt changes. The Trade Unions claimed independence from the ruling party, calling for better wages and working conditions while supporting government crackdowns on dissent. The status of Omonia sparked debate about its autonomy, with differing views on whether it was a legitimate force or an extension of the ruling party. The Ecology Party focused on environmental issues, particularly in industrial sectors, while the Agrarian Party sought to represent agricultural workers.

=== Candidates ===
The 1991 elections were contested by a total of 1,074 registered candidates. The Democratic Party fielded 250 candidates; the Party of Labour presented 243 candidates; the Republican Party nominated 165 candidates; the Democratic Front included 122 candidates; the Union of Women contributed 94 candidates; the Union of Youth also fielded 94 candidates; the Agrarian Party had 37 candidates; the Veteran's Committee nominated 7 candidates; and there were 17 independent candidates. Eligibility mandated that candidates be citizens permanently residing in Albania, with the only restriction was that individuals could contest for only one seat. Nominations could occur through three methods: first, endorsement by a registered party; second, running as independent candidates within a designated electoral zone, requiring the collection of 300 signatures from eligible voters; and third, the option for voters to write in names of candidates not formally listed on the ballot. Candidates were not required to reside in the zones they aspired to represent, reflecting characteristics similar in one-party communist structures. Local authorities were responsible for compiling voter registration lists, which were to be finalised and publicly accessible by 6 March. Candidates could register until 15 days prior to the election and withdraw their candidacy before voting began.

== Campaign ==
During the election campaign strict media restrictions posed remarkable challenges for the participating parties. The government maintained tight control over independent media, including print, television, and radio, which affected public discourse. The electoral law mandated parties to disclose their platforms while prohibiting ideologies regarded as fascist, racist, or associated to treason, thereby allowing for the potential disqualification of parties based on their ideological grounds. Candidates were prohibited from utilising foreign media for campaign purposes, but enforcement of this rule was inconsistent, allowing some candidates to receive coverage from international sources such as Voice of America. Further, the Decree 7048 of 31 July 1990 imposed stringent regulations on public gatherings. Organisers had to notify local authorities, and penalties for non-compliance included fines that reflected the average Albanian wage.

Enforcement of regulations varied considerably, many rallies and student protests experienced minimal interference, indicating a degree of tolerance for opposition activities, notably those organised by the Democrats. An instance involved their strategic relocation of a denied event by the Communists from the Skanderbeg Square to university facilities, attracting thousands of participants. Media control further intensified these challenges, as the Communists received disproportionate coverage that favored its narratives. Despite opposition efforts, coverage remained highly edited, undermining support for dissenting perspectives. Each party was allocated limited airtime, one hour followed by 45 minutes, yet coverage predominantly favoured the Party of Labour. Opposition complaints led to minor improvements, reports continued to diminish dissenting voices. Print media similarly exhibited bias, although the Democrats and Republicans managed to publish their own newspapers, Rilindja Demokratike and Republika.

== Conduct ==
Despite limitations on foreign assistance, international media played a key role in the 1991 elections. Around 300 journalists from 18 countries reported on the electoral process, which advanced scrutiny of the government and complicated the political dynamics. Opposition parties, particularly the Democrats and the Republicans, advocated for international observers to ensure the elections were fair and to prevent potential fraud by the ruling Communists. For instance, Jack Buechner, the President of the National Republican Institute for International Affairs (NRIIA), with Osman Osmani(NY) led a delegation to Tirana before the election. Furthermore, a delegation from the Commission on Security and Cooperation in Europe (CSCE) remained in Albania as election observers following a high-level visit led by Dennis DeConcini in late March.

== Results ==
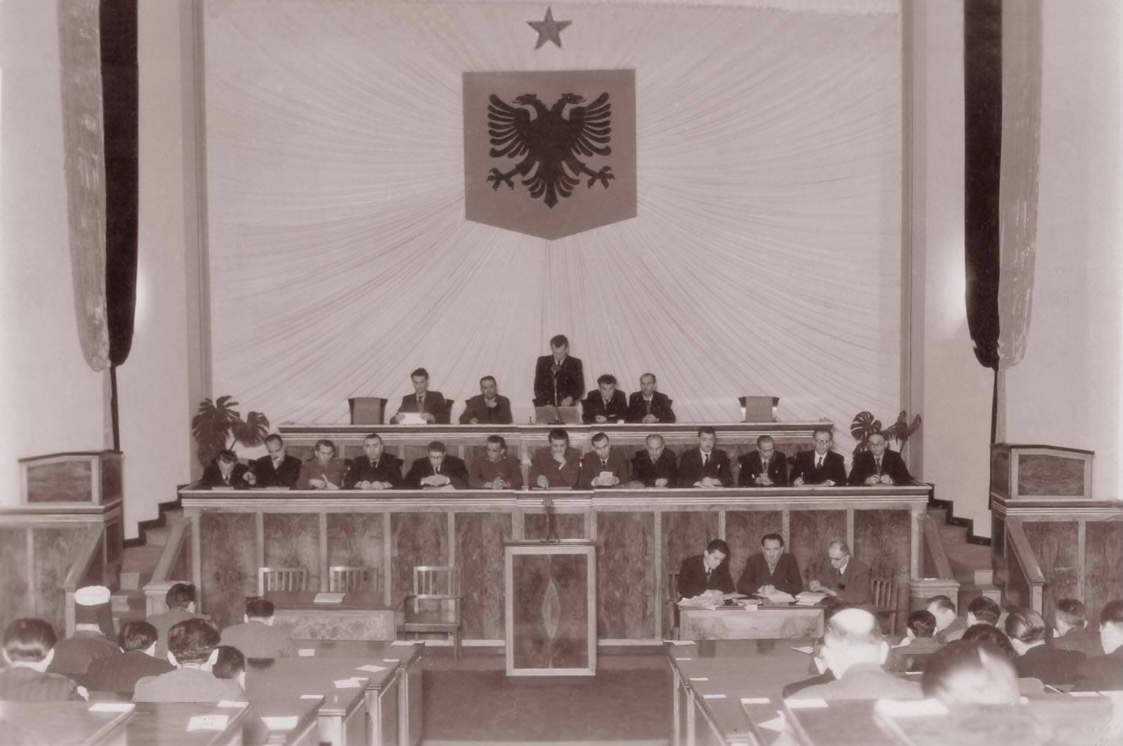
250 representatives were elected for the People's Assembly in the 1991 elections.

Elections occurred in 249 of the 250 electoral districts, resulting in the filling of 231 seats in the first round, with 17 seats requiring runoff elections, with Pogradec scheduled for a runoff on 7 April and Lushnjë on 14 April. Observers reported that the process demonstrated a high degree of organisation and compliance with established protocols. Polling committee members were sufficiently trained, and voters received essential information through various print media.

The Party of Labour sustained its dominance by securing 162 seats in the People's Assembly. This total was just short of the two-thirds majority necessary for constitutional amendments. In the second round of elections, the Communists gained an additional six seats. The electoral outcomes revealed a distinct urban-rural divide, while urban areas predominantly favored the Democrats, while rural regions remained loyal to the Communists. This loyalty was influenced by rural constituents' preference for stability in the face of proposed economic reforms. Notably, prominent Communist figures, including Alia and Kapllani, were unsuccessful in their electoral bids, whereas Fatos Nano retained his seat following a runoff election. Their influence was further demonstrated by the prevailing climate, marked by reports of voter intimidation that pronouncedly affected electoral dynamics in rural areas.

The opposition, particularly the Democratic Party, achieved notable success in the urban areas, with a landslide victory in Tirana, where Alia received only 32% of the vote and Muhamet Kapllani secured 33%. Berisha received 88% in Kavajë and Pashko obtained 64% in Vlorë. Eduard Selami received 47% in Korçë but lost to Communist Vasfi Sherifi, who garnered 52%. However, in rural districts such as Berat, Shkodër, and Elbasan, opposition candidates struggled to secure seats, ultimately gaining 65 seats in the People's Assembly. The Democrats gained an additional 10 seats in the runoff elections on 7 April in Pogradec and one more seat during the second round held on 14 April in Lushnjë. Conversely, the Republicans failed to win any seats, primarily due to a strategic misstep by Sabri Godo, whose endorsement of certain Communist candidates, which fostered perceptions of them as a front organisation. After the elections, protests erupted in Shkodër over unexpected results, escalating on 2 April with demonstrations outside Party of Labour headquarters, leading to violent clashes and the deaths of Arben Broci, Bujar Bishanaku, Besnik Ceka and Nazmi Kryeziu.

Party	Votes	%	Seats	+/–
Party of Labour	1,046,120	56.17	169	–81
Democratic Party	720,948	38.71	75	+75
Republican Party	27,393	1.47	0	0
Omonoia	13,538	0.73	5	+5
Veteran's Committee	5,241	0.28	1	+1
Agrarian Party	1,379	0.07	0	0
Ecology Party	65	0.00	0	0
Other parties	47,836	2.57	0	0
Total	1,862,520	100.00	250	0
Valid votes	1,862,520	95.46		
Invalid/blank votes	88,484	4.54		
Total votes	1,951,004	100.00		
Registered voters/turnout	1,977,516	98.66		
Source: Nohlen & Stöver, Dawisha & Parrott

== Aftermath ==
Following the elections, Albania remained in a protracted transitional period marked by multiple political changes, social unrest, and economic challenges in the subsequent months. The elections sparked widespread protests and strikes throughout Albania, resulting in significant unrest that exerted substantial pressure on Alia and the ruling Party of Labour to implement reforms. The inaugural session of the People's Assembly on 10 April, was marked by the absence of Democratic Party members, who chose to boycott the parliament in response to perceived inadequacies in the investigation of the unrest in Shkodër. In response to pressures for reform, the parliament adopted a provisional constitution on 29 April, aimed at constituting the foundational principles of democracy. The document comprised provisions for the separation of powers, the protection of human rights, and the formation of a multi-party system, thereby laying the foundation for the current republic of Albania. Further, it reintroduced the presidency as the head of state and led to the election of Alia on 30 April, who resigned as First Secretary of the Party of Labour to assume the office.

Nevertheless, the government by the prime minister Nano promptly confronted challenges as the "no-strike agreement" with opposition parties expired on 1 May. Shortly thereafter, on 16 May, the independent trade unions federation advocated for a general strike, demanding a 50% wage increase, a reduction in the working week, a ban on women working night shifts, and the resignation of the communist government. By late May, reports indicated that 70% of the urban workforce participated in the strike, resulting in the shutdown of approximately 90% of enterprises. Confronted with this untenable situation, Nano announced his resignation as the prime minister on 4 June 1991. This event facilitated the formation of a stability government under Ylli Bufi. However, on 3 December, his acknowledgment of severe food shortages ignited widespread unrest throughout Albania. This revelation led to panic buying and looting, resulting in casualties and underscoring the government's failure to address basic needs.

== See also ==
- Elections in Albania
- Politics of Albania
- 1991 Albanian presidential election
