= 1925 Albanian presidential election =

- 31 January 1925
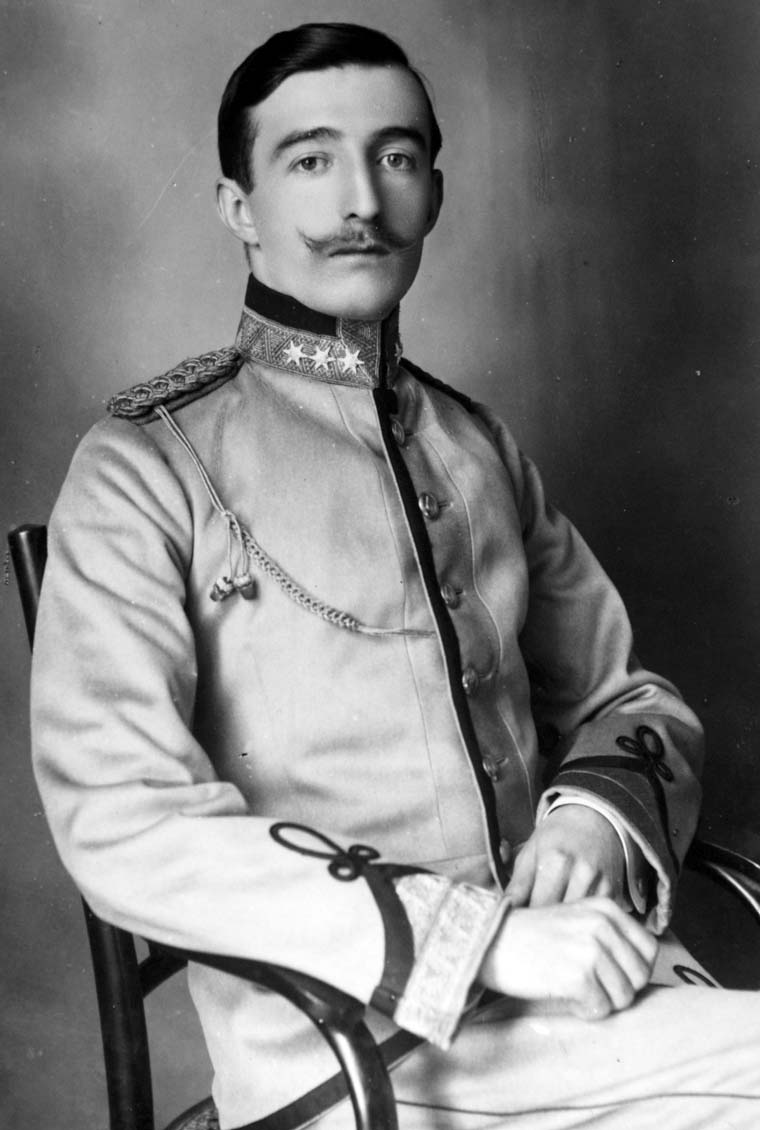
Candidate	Ahmet Zogu
Party	Independent
Electoral vote	100% (de facto)
Prime Minister (de facto leader) before election
Ahmet Zogu
President after election
Ahmet Zogu

The 1925 Albanian presidential election marked the first presidential election held on 31 January 1925 in Albania, electing the first president of Albania. The incumbent prime minister Ahmet Zogu won the election in a vote conducted by the parliament of Albania. Zogu was sworn in for his first seven-year term on 1 February 1925. It marked the first and last presidential election before Zogu was proclaimed the King of Albania on 1 September 1928. A second presidential election in Albania wouldn't occur until the fall of communism in Albania in 1991.

== Background ==
Following centuries of Ottoman domination beginning in the late 14th century, the Albanian Renaissance emerged in the 19th century, catalysed by broader European nationalist movements. Key intellectuals and political figures, particularly members of the League of Prizren, advocated for national unity and sovereignty. Amid the Balkan Wars, leaders declared independence from the Ottoman Empire on 28 November 1912, in Vlorë of southern Albania. The subsequent Conference of London recognised this independence but controversially limited territorial integrity, igniting tensions with Greece and Serbia, which sought to expand their borders at Albania's expense. Despite these challenges, the nation was acknowledged as an independent principality; however, it faced instability characterised by frequent governmental changes and political factionalism, often influenced by external powers. The Congress of Lushnjë in 1921 represented a pivotal step toward political stability, as representatives aimed to address national concerns and unify the fragmented political landscape. During this period, Ahmet Zogu emerged as a prominent political and military figure, gradually consolidating power. His influence increased as he navigated the complexities of governance, culminating in his election as president in 1925.

=== Constitutional development ===
The aftermath of the Congress of Lushnjë marked the beginning of a significant era in Albania's constitutional evolution, initiating the establishment of the nation as a parliamentary republic. This initial framework established essential governmental institutions, which included the high state council, a bicameral legislature, and an elected collegiate head of state. A subsequent phase in this constitutional development was heralded by the enactment of the basic statute in 1925 by the national assembly, which reaffirmed Albania's designation as a parliamentary republic. During this period, a critical event unfolded with the emergence of Fan Noli's government, which represented a liberal coalition that successfully displaced Ahmet Zogu's administration in June 1924. Noli's administration sought to implement democratic reforms but encountered considerable resistance from various factions. Within a matter of months, Zogu orchestrated a coup d'état, effectively restoring his authority over the government. In the wake of his reinstatement, Zogu convened a constitutional assembly, which formally declared Albania a republic on 21 January 1925. The drafted constitution was informed by contemporary democratic principles and reinstated the presidency, alongside a bicameral legislative body composed of the senate and the chamber of deputies, as well as independent judicial institutions. This governance framework was significantly influenced by modern democratic models, particularly the American system.

== See also ==
- President of Albania
- Politics of Albania
- 1925 Albanian parliamentary election
