= Party of Labour of Albania =

Ruling party of Albania from 1945 to 1991

Party of Labour of Albania Partia e Punës e Shqipërisë
- Governing body: Politburo of the PPSh
- First Secretary: Enver Hoxha, (Note: (From 8 November 1941 – 11 April 1985)) Ramiz Alia (Note: (From 13 April 1985 – 13 June 1991))
- Founded: 8 November 1941; 85 years ago
- Dissolved: 13 June 1991; 35 years ago
- Succeeded by: Socialist Party of Albania
- Headquarters: Tirana, Albania (Note: Specifically Dëshmorët e Kombit Boulevard)
- Newspaper: Zëri i Popullit (press organ)
- Youth wing: Labour Youth Union of Albania
- Pioneer wing: Pioneers of Enver
- Military wing: Albanian People's Army
- Membership: approx. 147,000 (1986 est.)
- Ideology: Communism; Marxism–Leninism (Note: The party was committed to Marxism–Leninism throughout its existence, with Stalinism exerted as the dominant form of Marxism–Leninism, accompanied in later years by Hoxhaism, an anti-revisionist variant of Marxism–Leninism developed in the late 1970s.)
- Political position: Far-left
- Colours: Red (official)
- Anthem: "Internacionale" (lit. 'The Internationale')
- Part of: National Liberation Front; Cominform (1947–1956); Democratic Front of Albania

The Party of Labour of Albania (Albanian: Partia e Punës e Shqipërisë, PPSh), was the ruling and sole legal party of Albania during the communist period (1944–1991). It was founded on 8 November 1941 as the Communist Party of Albania (Partia Komuniste e Shqipërisë, PKSh) but changed its name in 1948 following a recommendation by Joseph Stalin. The party dissolved on 13 June 1991 and refounded itself as the Socialist Party of Albania. For most of its existence, the party was dominated by its first leader, Enver Hoxha, who was also the leader of Albania from 1944 until his death in 1985.

== Background ==
In the 1920s, Albania was the only Balkan country without a communist party. The first Albanian communists emerged from the followers of Albanian clergyman and politician Fan S. Noli; having arrived in Moscow, these formed the National Revolutionary Committee and became affiliated with the Comintern. In August 1928, the first Albanian Communist Party was formed in the Soviet Union. The most prominent figure of the party was Ali Kelmendi, who left Albania in 1936 to fight in the Spanish Civil War. He was later regarded as the leader of a small group of Albanian Communists in France. However, no unified organization existed in Albania until 1941.

== History ==
=== World War II ===
Following the German attack on the Soviet Union in June 1941, Yugoslav leader Josip Broz Tito, under Comintern directives, sent two Yugoslav delegates, Miladin Popović and Dušan Mugoša, to Albania. These two helped unite the Albanian communist groups in 1941. After intensive work, the Albanian Communist Party was formed on 8 November 1941 by a delegation from Shkodër, with Enver Hoxha from the Korça branch as its leader.

The PKSh was the dominant element of the National Liberation Movement (LNC), formed in 1942. The LNC drove out the German occupiers (who had taken over from the Italians in 1943) on 29 November 1944. From that day onward, Albania was a full-fledged Communist state. In every other Eastern European country, the Communists were at least nominally part of a coalition government for a few years before seizing power at the helm of out-and-out Communist regimes. King Zog was barred from ever returning to Albania, though the monarchy was not formally abolished until January 1946.

In the elections for the Constituent Assembly held on 2 December 1945, voters were presented with a single list from the Democratic Front, organized and led by the PKSh. The Front received 93.7% of the vote.

=== Hoxha era (1945–1985) ===
In a meeting with Hoxha in July 1947, Joseph Stalin suggested the party be renamed to the "Party of Labour of Albania" because peasants were a majority in the country. Hoxha accepted this suggestion, and the party was renamed in 1948. During the period from 1947 to 1953, relations between the Party of Labour of Albania and the Soviet Union were close, as Hoxha steered the party towards a firm Stalinist line. For their part, the Soviets gave significant technological and economical aid to Albania, and also stationed military forces on the Adriatic sea with Hoxha's blessing.

However, following Stalin's death, the party became the most rigidly anti-revisionist party in the Soviet Bloc. In 1961, Hoxha broke with Moscow over Nikita Khrushchev's supposed deviations from fundamental principles of Marxism-Leninism, though relations between Tirana and Moscow had begun to chill as early as 1955. During this time, pro-Moscow elements of the party were purged, including Liri Belishova and Koço Tashko. Having once again eliminated his rivals, Hoxha opted instead to align his party with the People's Republic of China under Mao Zedong. In 1968, Albania formally withdrew from the Warsaw Pact. The party even went as far as to engineer an Albanian version of China's Cultural Revolution.

After Mao's death, the PKSh distanced itself from China as Mao's successors reformed and opened up the economy. In 1978, Hoxha declared that Albania would blaze its own trail to a socialist society. Hoxha led the party and state more or less without resistance until his death in 1985.

=== Post-Hoxha (1985–1991) ===
Hoxha's successor, Ramiz Alia, was forced to initiate gradual reforms in order to end the country's economic stagnation. However, in late 1989, various elements of society began to speak out against the restrictions still in place. The execution of Romanian dictator Nicolae Ceauşescu led Alia to fear he would be next. In response, he allowed Albanians to travel abroad, ended the regime's longstanding policy of state atheism, and slightly loosened government control of the economy. However, these measures only served to buy Alia more time. Finally, bowing to the inevitable, on 11 December 1990, Alia announced that the PPSh had abandoned its monopoly of power, effectively ending Communist rule in Albania. PPSh won the subsequent elections of 1991, the first contested election held in the country in decades. However, by then it was no longer a Marxist-Leninist party, and an interim basic law adopted that September formally stripped it of its monopoly of power.

In 1991, the PPSh dissolved and refounded itself as the social-democratic Socialist Party of Albania, which is now one of the two major political parties in Albania.

== Structure ==
The ideology of the PPSh was an anti-revisionist variant of Marxism–Leninism known as Hoxhaism. The party organisation was built up following democratic centralist principles, with Hoxha as its First Secretary. Article 3 of Albania's 1976 Constitution identified the Party as the "leading political force of the state and of the society". To help carry out its ideological activities it had an associated mass organization known as the Democratic Front. Its daily publication was Zëri i Popullit (Voice of the People) and its monthly theoretical journal was Rruga e Partisë (Road of the Party).

The highest organ of the Party, according to the Party statutes, was the Party Congress, which met for a few days every five years. Delegates to the Congress were elected at conferences held at the regional, district, and city levels. The Congress examined and approved reports submitted by the Central Committee, discussed general Party policies, and elected the Central Committee. The latter was the next-highest level in the Party hierarchy and generally included all key officials in the government, as well as prominent members of the Sigurimi. The Central Committee directed Party activities between Party Congresses and met approximately three times a year.

As in the Soviet Union, the Central Committee elected a Politburo and a Secretariat. The Politburo, which usually included key government ministers and Central Committee secretaries, was the main administrative and policy-making body and convened on a weekly basis. Generally, the Central Committee approved Politburo reports and policy decisions. The Secretariat was responsible for guiding the day-to-day affairs of the Party, in particular for organising the execution of Politburo decisions and for selecting Party and government cadres.

== First Secretaries of the Party of Labour of Albania ==
- Enver Hoxha (8 November 1941 – 11 April 1985)
- Ramiz Alia (13 April 1985 – 13 June 1991)

== Electoral history ==
=== Parliamentary elections ===
Election	Party leader	Votes	%	Seats	+/–	Position	Government
1945	Enver Hoxha	as part of Democratic Front of Albania		82 / 82	▲82	▲1st	Sole legal party
1950	Enver Hoxha	as part of Democratic Front of Albania		121 / 121	▲39	1st	Sole legal party
1954	Enver Hoxha	as part of Democratic Front of Albania		134 / 134	▲13	1st	Sole legal party
1958	Enver Hoxha	as part of Democratic Front of Albania		188 / 188	▲54	1st	Sole legal party
1962	Enver Hoxha	as part of Democratic Front of Albania		214 / 214	▲26	1st	Sole legal party
1966	Enver Hoxha	as part of Democratic Front of Albania		240 / 240	▲26	1st	Sole legal party
1970	Enver Hoxha	as part of Democratic Front of Albania		264 / 264	▲24	1st	Sole legal party
1974	Enver Hoxha	as part of Democratic Front of Albania		250 / 250	▼14	1st	Sole legal party
1978	Enver Hoxha	as part of Democratic Front of Albania		250 / 250	Steady	1st	Sole legal party
1982	Enver Hoxha	as part of Democratic Front of Albania		250 / 250	Steady	1st	Sole legal party
1987	Ramiz Alia	as part of Democratic Front of Albania		250 / 250	Steady	1st	Sole legal party
1991	Ramiz Alia	1,046,120	56.17 (#1)	169 / 250	▼81	1st	Majority

== See also ==
- Democratic Front of Albania
- History of Albania
- Fall of communism in Albania
- Eastern Bloc politics
- Politburo of the Party of Labour of Albania
