= National Veteran's Committee =

Pro-communist political party in Albania

The National Committee of Anti-Fascist War Veterans of the Albanian People (Albanian: Komiteti Kombëtar i Veteranëve të Luftës Antifashiste të Popullit Shqiptar) was a pro-communist political party in Albania.

== History ==
The party contested the Constituent Assembly elections in 1991, the first multi-party elections held since World War II. It received just 0.3% of the vote, but won a single seat in the 250-seat Assembly. However, it did not contest any subsequent elections.
