= 1991 Albanian presidential election =

- 30 April 1991
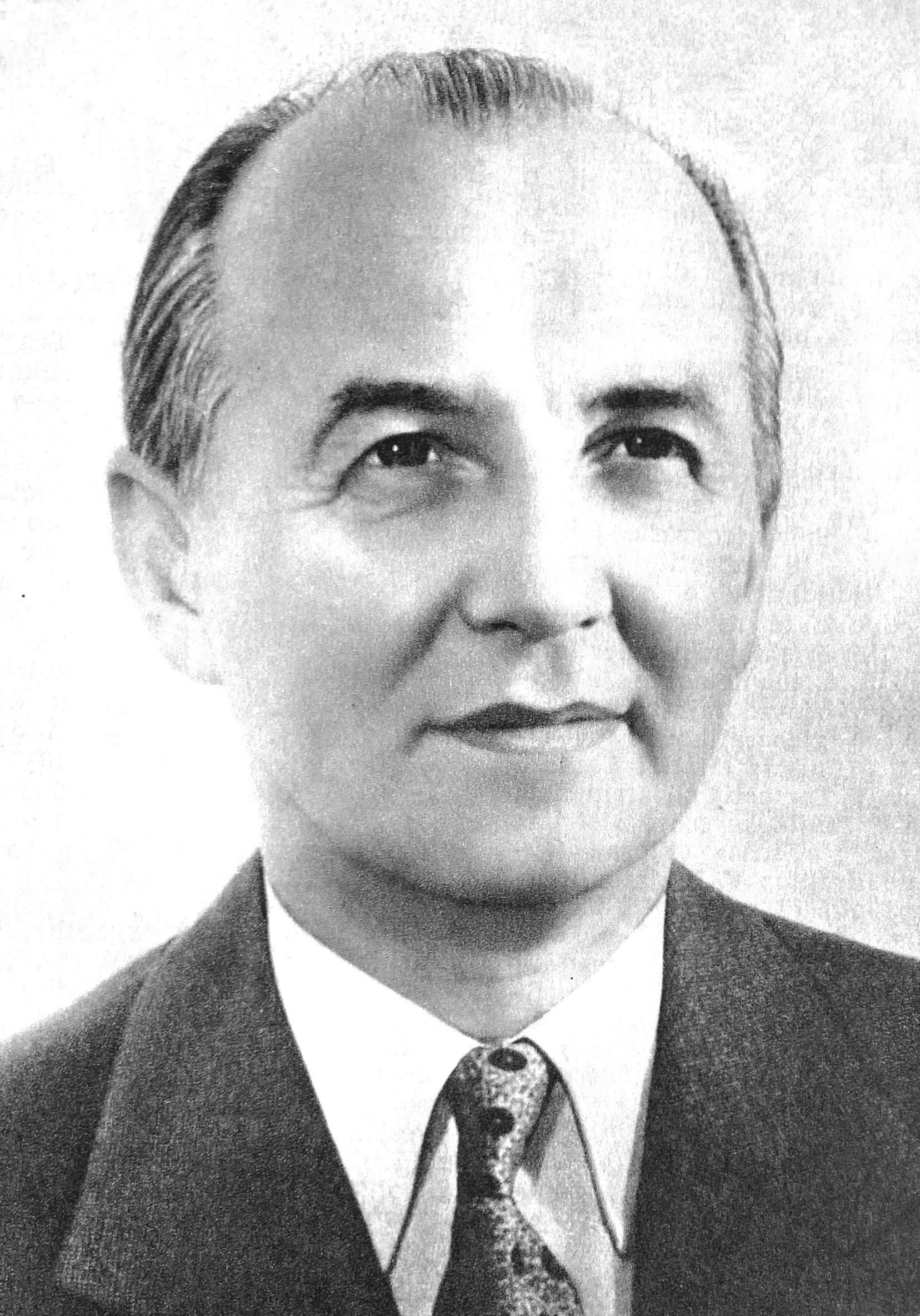
Candidate	Ramiz Alia
President before election
Ramiz Alia as Chairman of the Presidium of the People's Assembly
PPSh
Elected President
Ramiz Alia
PPSh

The 1991 Albanian presidential election marked the second presidential election held on 30 April 1991 in Albania. The transition from the communist regime to a multi-party democracy culminated in the 1991 parliamentary elections, following the death of Enver Hoxha and growing discontent under his successor, Ramiz Alia. The Democratic Party's emergence and subsequent electoral success, alongside protests in response to the results, led to the adoption of a provisional constitution on 29 April 1991, establishing Albania as a parliamentary republic and reintroducing the presidency one day before Alia was elected. Following the elections, Albania experienced significant political upheaval, social unrest, and economic hardship under President Alia, culminating in widespread strikes led by independent trade unions demanding better wages and conditions. The resignation of prime minister Fatos Nano on 4 June, and subsequent government failures, including a severe food shortage that sparked panic and looting, fueled mass emigration as discontent grew, ultimately leading to the Democratic Party's decisive victory in the 1992 elections and Alia's resignation.

== Background and history ==
The transition from a communist regime in Albania, marked by Enver Hoxha's stringent adherence to Marxist-Leninist principles and authoritarian governance, to a multi-party democratic system reached a pivotal phase during the 1991 parliamentary elections. Following Hoxha's death in 1985, his successor, Ramiz Alia, encountered escalating economic difficulties and widespread social discontent, particularly in the context of significant political changes across Eastern Europe resulting from the Revolutions of 1989. In December 1990, the Democratic Party was founded, signaling the beginning of legislative reforms that dismantled the entrenched one-party system. This development facilitated the collapse of communism in Albania. In the elections, the Party of Labor secured 162 seats in the Kuvendi Popullor, falling just short of the two-thirds majority required for constitutional amendments. Conversely, the Democratic Party garnered substantial support in urban regions, whereas rural constituencies exhibited a tendency to remain loyal to the Party of Labour. Following the elections, significant protests erupted in Shkodër in response to the unexpected electoral outcomes, resulting in violent confrontations that led to multiple fatalities and underscoring the fraught political climate of the period. During the inaugural session of the Kuvendi Popullor on 10 April 1991, members of the Democratic Party boycotted proceedings, protesting the lack of thorough investigations into the unrest in Shkodër. Subsequently, on 29 April, the parliament adopted a provisional constitution that encompassed the Basic Constitutional Provisions. This act established the parliamentary republic of Albania and reintroduced the presidency as the head of state. Significantly, this development took place one day prior to the official announcement of Alia's election to the presidency.

== Election process ==
The constitution of 29 April marked the first formal foundation of the presidency in Albania following the collapse of the communist regime. The president was elected by the Kuvendi Popullor from at least two candidates for a term of five years. The election process began with the parliament conducting a secret ballot, where a two-thirds majority of all deputies was required in the first round. If no candidate secured this majority, a second round was held in which the two candidates with the highest votes from the first round competed, and an absolute majority was needed to win. Candidates for the presidency had to be proposed by a group of at least 30 deputies. To be eligible, a candidate had to be an Albanian citizen, at least 40 years old, and meet the qualifications necessary to be elected as a deputy. The election of the president had to take place no later than 30 days before the end of the outgoing president's term, and an individual could not serve as president for more than two consecutive terms. If a deputy was elected president, they had to resign from their legislative role. The mandates of the president included ensuring compliance with the constitution and other laws, convening the first session of the newly elected parliamenty, and setting dates for general and local elections. Additionally, the president had the authority to promulgate laws and referendums passed by the parliament, return laws for reconsideration within 15 days of their adoption, and appoint or accept the resignation of the prime minister. In cases where the parliament could not convene, the president could declare states of emergency or war and mobilise national defense efforts. Moreover, the president could issue individual decrees and, in urgent situations, normative decrees that required subsequent approval from the parliament. The president enjoyed immunity for actions taken while in office, except in cases of treason or violation of the constitution, where accountability could be sought from the parliament.

== Aftermath ==
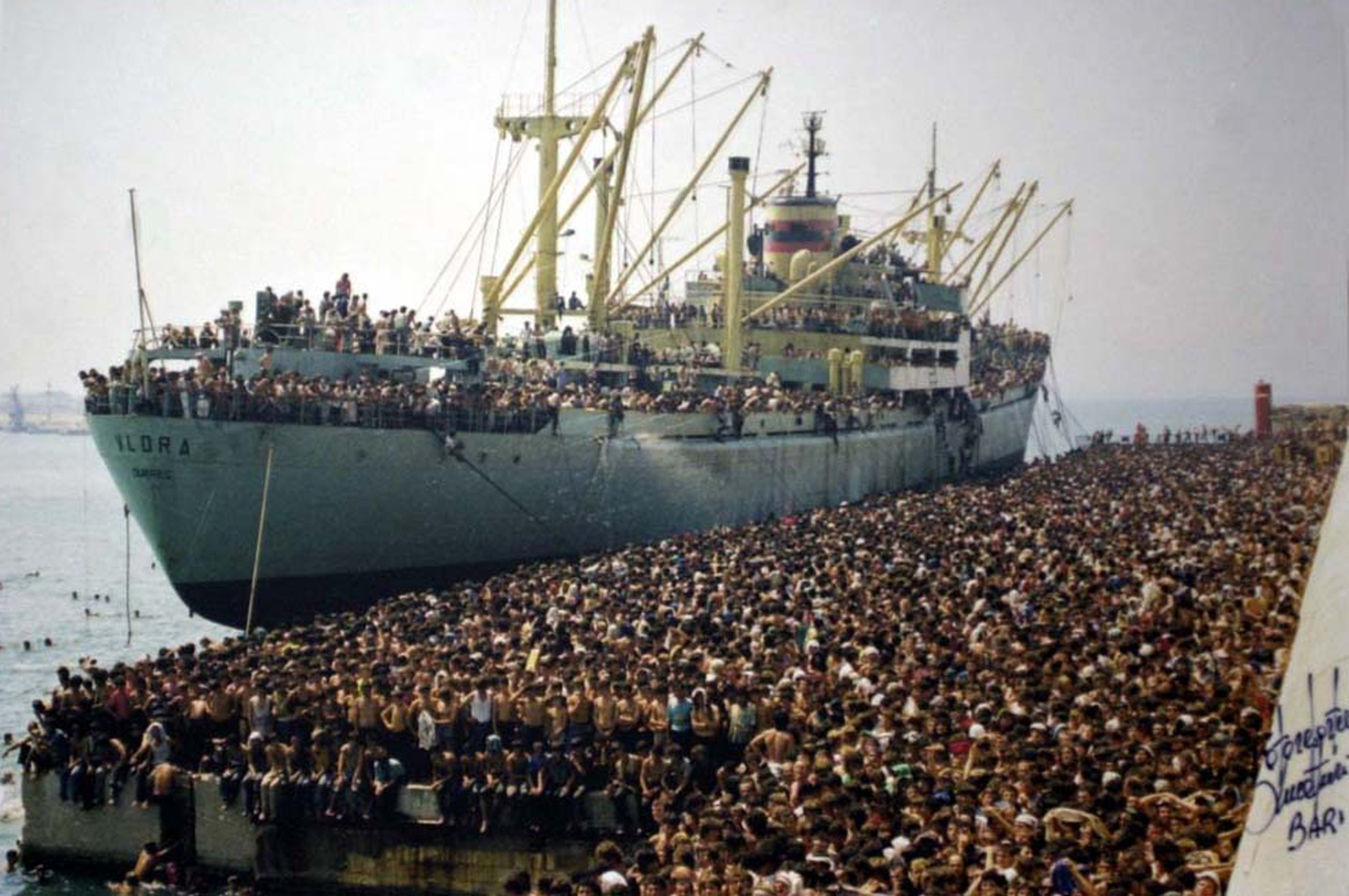
The Vlora ship of 1991 was a passenger ferry that symbolised mass emigration from Albania as thousands sought refuge in Italy amidst political upheaval.

Following the 1991 elections, Albania underwent a tumultuous transition characterised by several political shifts, social unrest, and economic difficulties under the presidency of Alia. The government led by the prime minister Fatos Nano promptly confronted challenges as the "no-strike agreement" with non-communist parties expired on 1 May. Shortly thereafter, on 16 May, the independent trade unions federation advocated for a general strike, demanding a 50% wage increase, a reduction in the working week, a ban on women working night shifts, and the resignation of thecommunist government. By late May, reports indicated that 70% of the urban workforce participated in the strike, resulting in the shutdown of approximately 90% of enterprises. Confronted with this untenable situation, Nano announced his resignation as the prime minister on 4 June 1991. This event facilitated the formation of a stability government under Ylli Bufi. However, on 3 December, his acknowledgment of severe food shortages ignited widespread unrest throughout Albania. This revelation led to panic buying and looting, resulting in casualties and underscoring the government's failure to address basic needs. Throughout 1991, widespread economic and social collapse deeply unsettled the Albanian population, prompting many to seek escape. Approximately 20,000 Albanians fled by boat to Brindisi, followed by another 12,500 arriving in Bari by August. Concurrently, a significant number crossed the land border into Greece, drawing international attention to the ongoing crisis in Albania. As political and economic turmoil increased, discontent with the ruling Party of Labor intensified. By early 1992, widespread protests and advocated for reform culminated in the 1992 elections, during which the Democratic Party achieved a decisive victory, leading to the resignation of Alia.

== See also ==
- Elections in Albania
- Politics of Albania
- President of Albania
- 1991 Albanian parliamentary election
