= Bashkimi (Democratic Front newspaper) =

Albanian newspaper

- Founded: 1943
- Language: Albanian
- Headquarters: Tirana

Bashkimi is a newspaper published in Albania. Its name is derived from the Albanian word for "unity".

== History and profile ==
Bashkimi was established in 1943. Its headquarters is in Tirana. It used to be the organ of the Democratic Front.

As of 1995, it was published biweekly and had 5,000 readers.
