= 1987 Albanian parliamentary election =

- 1 February, 1987
- All 250 seats in the People's Assembly
- Turnout: 100%
Party	Leader	Vote %	Seats	+/–
Democratic Front	Ramiz Alia	100.00	250	0
This lists parties that won seats. See the complete results below.

Parliamentary elections were held in Albania on 1 February 1987. The Democratic Front, a mass organization of the Party of Labour of Albania, was the only political force able to contest the elections, and subsequently won all 250 seats. Voter turnout was reported to be 100%, with all registered voters voting. A single ballot, which was characterised by The Guardian's Simon Tisdall as belonging to "a lone voice of protest", was voided: the Albanian Telegraphic Agency stated that it was invalid and made no further comment.

== Results ==
Party	Votes	%	Seats	+/–
Democratic Front	1,830,652	100.00	250	0
Total	1,830,652	100.00	250	0
Valid votes	1,830,652	100.00		
Invalid/blank votes	1	0.00		
Total votes	1,830,653	100.00		
Registered voters/turnout	1,830,653	100.00		
Source: Nohlen & Stöver
