= 1958 Albanian parliamentary election =

Albanian parliamentary election

- 1 June 1958
- All 188 seats in the People's Assembly
- Turnout: 100%
Party	Leader	Vote %	Seats	+/–
Democratic Front	Enver Hoxha	98.82	188	+54
This lists parties that won seats. See the complete results below.

Parliamentary elections were held in the People's Republic of Albania on 1 June 1958. The Democratic Front, dominated by the Communist Party of Labour of Albania, was the only organization able to contest the elections, and subsequently won all 188 seats. Voter turnout was reported to be 99.82 percent, with only 127 registered voters failing to carry out their civic duty.

== Results ==
Party	Votes	%	Seats	+/–
Democratic Front	778,812	98.82	188	+54
Non-Front	9,311	1.18	–	–
Total	788,123	100.00	188	+54
Total votes	788,123	–		
Registered voters/turnout	788,250	99.98		
Source: Nohlen & Stöver
