= Republika (Albanian newspaper) =

- Format: Tabloid
- Owner: Part of R Group.Al Society Ltd.
- Founded: 1991; 34 years ago
- Language: Albanian
- Headquarters: Tirana
- Website: www.gazetarepublika.al

Republika (English: Republic) is a newspaper published in Tirana, Albania.

== History and profile ==
Republika was established in 1991. The paper has its headquarters in Tirana. It was owned by the Republican Party in the early 2000s. It is part of R Group.al Society Ltd. The paper is published six times a week in tabloid format.

=== Sections ===
The newspaper is organized in three sections, including the magazine.

1. News: Includes International, National, Tirana, Politics, Business, Technology, Science, Health, Sports, Education.
2. Opinion: Includes Editorials, Op-Eds and Letters to the Editor.
3. Features: Includes Arts, Movies, Theatre, and Sport.

Republika has had a web presence since 2007, accessing articles requires no registration.
