= 1996 Albanian local elections =

1996 Albanian Local Elections
- 20 October 1996; 27 October 1996

The Albanian local elections in 1996 was the second local election held in Albania. The elections were held on 20 and 27 October 1996 and the winner was the Democratic Party of Albania.

== Results ==
Party name	Result	Mayors	Head of Commune
Democratic Party of Albania	52,5%	58	267
Socialist Party of Albania	31,2%	4	15
Republican Party of Albania	3,5%	—N/a	—N/a
Social Democratic Party + Democratic Alliance Party	3,1%	—N/a	—N/a
Balli Kombëtar	2,4%	0	1
Unity for Human Rights Party	2,3%	0	9
Union of Social Democrats	1,0%	—N/a	—N/a
Other Parties	4,0%	1	5
