= 1945 Albanian parliamentary election =

Albanian parliamentary election

- 2 December 1945
- All 82 seats in the People's Assembly
- Turnout: 100%
Party	Leader	Vote %	Seats	+/–
Democratic Front	Enver Hoxha	93.18	82	0
Against all		6.77	0	0
Non-Front		0.05	0	0
This lists parties that won seats. See the complete results below.

Parliamentary elections for a Constituent Assembly were held in Albania on 2 December 1945. They were the first elections since the country was liberated by the Communist-dominated National Liberation Movement (LANÇ) a year earlier.

As would be the case for all elections in Albania through 1990, voters were presented with a single list from the LANÇ's successor, the Democratic Front, organized and led by the Communist Party of Albania. A small number of independent candidates also participated. The Front won all 82 seats.

== Background ==
As the Albanian National Liberation War of 1941-1944 came to a close, an interim Democratic Government of Albania was established on 20 October 1944 by a second meeting of the Anti-Fascist National Liberation Council (which had been established in Përmet in May that year) Its Prime Minister was Enver Hoxha, Secretary-General of the Communist Party of Albania.

During the National Liberation War the Communist Party was the only consistent anti-fascist political and military force. Two rival organizations, the Balli Kombëtar and the Legaliteti, had their prestige amongst the populace tarnished through collaboration with the German occupiers against the partisan forces led by the Communists. By the end of the war both organizations had been defeated.

The Democratic Front, which succeeded the wartime National Liberation Front in August 1945, had no other political parties within it besides the Communist Party of Albania, although the Front did have non-Party members.

In September 1945 a third meeting of the Anti-Fascist National Liberation Council was held, resulting in the adoption of a law on the formation of a Constituent Assembly as well as laws on the election of representatives to this Assembly and on the list of candidates on the basis of "general, equal, direct and secret ballot, and the necessary guarantees for the free exercise of the citizens' electoral rights." At this meeting, however, the liberal Education Minister, Gjergj Kokoshi, criticized the electoral law, calling it anti-democratic and calling for the Communist Party to play a secondary rather than primary role in the affairs of the Front. Hoxha responded to these criticisms saying: "The people organized in the Democratic Front, present their own candidates to the Assembly in the lists of the Front. If those who are outside the Front desire to be elected, let them present their candidatures individually. The draft law recognizes them this right and, indeed, will defend it." Kokoshi replied that independent candidates "are doomed to failure, because these elements are not organized in political parties and do not have their own press or propaganda. On the other hand, the men of the state power are all in the Front, thus no guarantees are given that other candidates will be elected." Kokoshi and a number of other non-communist Front members would later be accused of attempting to set up illegal opposition to the government with the assistance of the British Military Mission in Albania. The United Kingdom had called on the government to allow foreign election observers to observe the electoral process as a precondition for diplomatic recognition.

During the electoral campaign all Albanian citizens aged 18 and older, male and female alike, could vote, although collaborators, political fugitives, war criminals, and those deemed "enemies of the people" were deprived of this right. The Front presented its own list during the election in opposition to "some separate candidates who represented the bourgeois circles, but [who] failed completely from lack of support among the people." The Palm Beach Post noted that there were eighteen such candidates. Due to the overwhelming illiteracy of the population, voting was conducted by a small rubber ball stamped with a black eagle dropped either into a red ballot box for Front candidates or a black one for independents, with the voter putting his or her hand into both boxes to avoid others knowing who they had voted for.

American and British diplomatic observers concluded that the election had been fairly conducted and reflected the popularity of the Democratic Front. This opinion was also shared by foreign press correspondents who had visited the country to observe the elections. This was despite the Communists resorting to terror and propaganda to cow their opponents.

== Results ==
Party	Votes	%	Seats
Democratic Front	506,319	93.18	82
Independents	277	0.05	0
Against all	36,758	6.77	–
Total	543,354	100.00	82
Total votes	543,354	–	
Registered voters/turnout	603,566	90.02	
Source: Gazeta Liberale

== Aftermath ==
The representatives elected were, with few exceptions, members of the Communist Party. The Constituent Assembly was first convened on 10 January 1946. At 12.00 AM on 11 January, during its second session, the Assembly unanimously proclaimed Albania a People's Republic at the proposal of Hysni Kapo, formally abolishing the prewar monarchy and forbidding King Zog and his heirs from reentering the country. On 12 January the Presidium of the Assembly was elected after some opposition from liberal and conservative deputies, with Omer Nishani being elected Chairman of the Presidium and the Presidium itself comprising Enver Hoxha, Myslim Peza, Nako Spiru, Medar Shtylla, Sami Baholli, Ramadan Çitaku, Qirjako Harito and others. After a period of public debate and discussion on the constitutional draft, Albania's first postwar Constitution was enacted on 14 March and the Constituent Assembly was then turned into the People's Assembly. On 18 March Hoxha was tasked by this Assembly on its first meeting with forming a new government, which was approved on 22 March and sworn in on 24 March with Hoxha as Chairman of the Council of Ministers (prime minister).

This election set the tone for all elections held in Albania until 1990. At all other elections during the Communist era, the Democratic Front would claim at least 98 percent of the vote.
