= 1950 Albanian parliamentary election =

- 28 May 1950
- All 121 seats in the People's Assembly
- Turnout: 100%
Party	Leader	Vote %	Seats	+/–
Democratic Front	Enver Hoxha	98.18	121	+39
This lists parties that won seats. See the complete results below.

Parliamentary elections were held in the People's Republic of Albania on 28 May 1950. Candidates were nominated by the Democratic Front, which was an organization subservient to the ruling Albanian Party of Labour. The Front won all 121 seats, with voter turnout reported to be 99.4%.

== Results ==
Party	Votes	%	Seats	+/–
Democratic Front	626,005	98.18	121	+39
Non-Front	11,573	1.82	–	–
Total	637,578	100.00	121	+39
Total votes	637,578	–		
Registered voters/turnout	641,241	99.43		
Source: Nohlen & Stöver
