= Labour Youth Union of Albania =

Youth wings of political parties in Albania

Labour Youth Union of Albania Albanian: Bashkimi i Rinisë së Punës së Shqipërisë
- Founded: November 23, 1941
- Dissolved: 1991
- Headquarters: Tirana, People's Socialist Republic of Albania
- Membership: 200.000
- Ideology: Communism; Marxism–Leninism; Stalinism; Hoxhaism; Anti-revisionism
- Mother party: Party of Labour of Albania
- National affiliation: Democratic Front (1945–1991)
- International affiliation: WFDY

The Labour Youth Union of Albania (Albanian: Bashkimi i Rinisë së Punës së Shqipërisë) was the youth organization of the Party of Labour of Albania. Founded on November 23, 1941 as the Communist Youth it was officially described as the "greatest revolutionary force of inexhaustible strength" and a "strong fighting reserve of the party" it was a key organization for political socialization in socialist Albania. It was affiliated with the Democratic Front.

== Organization ==
The union operated directly under the Party of Labour of Albania, with its local organs supervised by the relevant district or city party committees. Founded in 1941, the union was considered one of the most important auxiliaries of the party. Organized in the same way as the party, the union had city and district committees, and higher organs, including the politburo and Central Committee. It was patterned after All-Union Leninist Communist Youth League, known as Komsomol, in the Soviet Union.

=== Membership ===
The more than 200,000 members of the union ranged in age from fifteen to twenty-five. The union was responsible for controlling all Pioneer organizations, which embraced children from seven to fourteen years of age; for implementing party directives among youth; and for mobilizing so-called volunteer labor brigades to work on special economic projects. Membership in the union was a prerequisite for those aspiring to a career in the party or state apparatus.

== Pioneer of Albania ==
The union had under its wing the Pioneers of Enver, formerly known simply as the pioneer movement, which had started in World War II, with the Debatik, a youth scout movement, created in 1942.
