= Democratic Front of Albania =

Democratic Front of Albania Fronti Demokratik i Shqipërisë
- Abbreviation: FDSH
- First leader: Enver Hoxha
- Last leader: Adil Çarçani
- Founded: August 5, 1945
- Dissolved: 1992
- Headquarters: Tirana
- Newspaper: Bashkimi
- Ideology: Communism; Marxism–Leninism (Note: The organization was committed to Marxism–Leninism throughout its existence, with Stalinism exerted as the dominant form of Marxism–Leninism, accompanied in later years by Hoxhaism, an anti-revisionist variant of Marxism–Leninism developed in the late 1970s.); Socialist patriotism

The Democratic Front of Albania (FDSH) (Albanian: Fronti Demokratik i Shqipërisë) was the largest mass organization of the Party of Labour of Albania (known between 1941 and 1948 as the Communist Party of Albania), which united all other mass organizations of the Party within it. The party was responsible for carrying out the Party's cultural and social programs to the masses, and was in charge of nominating candidates in elections.

== History ==
On September 16, 1942, the National Liberation Front was established at the initiative of the Communist Party of Albania and with the aim of uniting all Albanians in a national liberation war against the Italian (and later Nazi German) occupiers. On November 29, 1944 the country was liberated, and the NLF began its First Congress on August 5, 1945. It elected Enver Hoxha Chairman, renamed itself the Democratic Front, and oriented its work "against the manoeuvres of reaction, its organizational consolidation, the activization of the masses in concrete actions, the political mobilization of the whole people to wipe out the remnants of fascism in the political, economic and cultural fields." Subsequent Congresses were held in May 1950, June 1955, September 1967, June 1979 and June 1989. The Front gained official recognition alongside labor unions, cooperatives, and other mass organizations of the Party of Labour in July 1950 following amendments to the Constitution.

Party historiography summed up the early work of the Front as follows: "The front was to be the mainstay of the people's power in its struggle to safeguard freedom and national independence, to reconstruct the country, to achieve its economic, social and cultural development on the road to socialism. The role of the front was the mobilization and political education of the broad masses of the people and the strengthening of the political unity of the Albanian people around the CPA.... The leading force in the front was the working class, to which were now opened wide vistas of increasing in numbers and becoming an industrial working class of a high socialist consciousness... The laboring peasantry, which had borne the brunt of battle in the National-liberation War, remained the broadest base of the Democratic Front."

At the 7th Congress of the Party of Labour in 1976 Hoxha referred to the Front as a "great political organization which realizes the unity of the Albanian people under the leadership of the Party, has wide scope of action in this field." Continuing, he stated that, "In cooperation with the other social organizations, the Front is called upon to carry out all-round work with the urban and rural masses to make the policy, orientations and directives of the Party clear to them, to educate them in the spirit of socialist patriotism, revolutionary vigilance, combat readiness and irreconcilability towards all alien manifestations, to constantly strengthen and temper the unity of the people. The Democratic Front has been and remains a great tribune of the revolutionary opinion of the masses, a powerful lever of the Party to draw the working people into governing the country and solving problems of the socialist construction and the defence of the homeland."

Following the death of Hoxha, his wife Nexhmije served as Chairwoman of the Front from 1986 until being replaced by Adil Çarçani in 1990. The famous writer Ismail Kadare was the deputy chairman of the organization during those years. As a result of the 12th Plenum of the Central Committee of the Party of Labour in November 1990 the Front as well as other mass organizations were given the ability to put forward multiple candidates in elections to the People's Assembly independently of the PLA. In the 1991-1992 period the Front was disbanded.

== Functions ==
The Democratic Front was open to all Albanians aged eighteen and older excepting the former bourgeoisie, kulaks, and other perceived anti-state elements. Albanian author Anton Logoreci writes that, "Without a Democratic Front card [a person] cannot obtain work, get a ration book (when one is required), make a purchase at government stores and so on." Its newspaper was titled Bashkimi, which with the Party daily Zëri i Popullit constituted the main political news organs. The Front also had a semiweekly newspaper titled Laiko Vima for the Greek minority.

In Albania's first post war election held in December 1945 the Front submitted its own list of candidates, winning over 93% of the vote. Hoxha later recalled that, "The list of the Front found the approval of the masses everywhere, and this fact was so evident that reaction did not even attempt to organize itself and to come out with a list of its own." During the subsequent period in Albanian history no electoral list opposite that of the Front was tolerated. In these elections the Front and the mass organizations united within it nominated members of electoral committees and presented candidates. Unlike other states in Eastern Europe, the Party of Labour's official History noted that "there have never been other political parties in the country [which] has been a very favorable phenomenon for the working class, the people, for the revolution and socialism in Albania."

In general practice it was tasked with "enlist[ing] the widest possible support for the party's programme and its revolutionary enterprises... disseminat[ing] the teachings of Marxist-Leninist ideology beyond the narrow circle of the communist élite, it campaigns against political, social and other attitudes regarded as harmful or reactionary by the party leadership." It united all "organizations of trade unions, of the youth and students, of women, of veterans from the national liberation struggle and of pioneers" such as the Trade Unions of Albania, the Union of Albanian Women, the League of Writers and Artists of Albania, the Labour Youth Union of Albania, and other mass organizations. The Party's History notes that, "The PLA has always regarded the unity of the people in the Democratic Front as a unity of classes, strata and people who have no antagonistic contradictions, who are linked by common interests and aims for one or more definite historical stages."

In relations among the people the Front sought to expand the practice of criticism; at the Fourth Congress of the Front Hoxha stated that, "The idea that 'there are special people to supervise the activity of government employees' should be discarded as a erroneous idea which hampers the initiative of the masses and that of the organizations of the Democratic Front to organize and encourage worker supervision.... The organizations of the Front should be more active and combative as rostrums whence the powerful voice of criticism by the masses should be heard about every shortcoming and weakness in the work of state organs and of persons employed in them. They should show more courage and severity towards every one who looks down upon and smothers their voice. State problems are the concern of the working people as a whole... a major role belongs to the organization of the Democratic Front to increase the participation of the masses in the study and solution of major problems of state, to make the masses fully aware of the duty to take active work in running the affairs of the country. Without this we cannot speak of enforcing further democratization of the people's power, of fighting bureaucratism." According to a 1982 government work, "The Democratic Front has played and still plays an important role in the struggle against bureaucracy... encourag[ing] the control of the masses over the state organs and the persons working there.... At their meetings, the organizations of the Democratic Front encourage the broad and free debating of problems which concern and preoccupy them. In particular, they stimulate open and unrestricted criticism by the masses of shortcomings and errors."

The Front and its organizations were also tasked with "transmitting the Party line to the people, in educating them in political unity around the Party and the socialist state and also in providing organised attendance to what the masses in the countryside and cities have to say so that they can participate actively in solving social and state problems and in struggling against regressive habits and tendencies inimical the building of socialism." Together with other mass organizations the Front also played a role in the struggle against religion, patriarchy and other customs deemed backward, as well as promote in the countryside a better quality of life through improved hygiene, communal and educational services, and greater access to culture. At the Sixth Congress of the Front in 1989 Nexhmije Hoxha noted that, "The Democratic Front has always been in the front lines to free the people from the chains of religion and the savage laws of the unwritten code of the mountains."

== Electoral history ==
=== Parliamentary elections ===
Election	Party leader	Votes	%	Seats	+/–	Position	Government
1945	Enver Hoxha	505,304	93.7%	82 / 82	▲82	▲1st	Sole legal coalition
1950	Enver Hoxha	626,005	98.2%	121 / 121	▲39	1st	Sole legal coalition
1954	Enver Hoxha	701,942	99.9%	134 / 134	▲13	1st	Sole legal coalition
1958	Enver Hoxha	778,812	98.82%	188 / 188	▲54	1st	Sole legal coalition
1962	Enver Hoxha	889,828	100%	214 / 214	▲26	1st	Sole legal coalition
1966	Enver Hoxha	978,114	100%	240 / 240	▲26	1st	Sole legal coalition
1970	Enver Hoxha	1,097,122	100%	264 / 264	▲24	1st	Sole legal coalition
1974	Enver Hoxha	1,248,528	100%	250 / 250	▼14	1st	Sole legal coalition
1978	Enver Hoxha	1,436,285	100%	250 / 250	Steady	1st	Sole legal coalition
1982	Enver Hoxha	1,627,959	100%	250 / 250	Steady	1st	Sole legal coalition
1987	Nexhmije Hoxha	1,830,652	100%	250 / 250	Steady	1st	Sole legal coalition
