= Zëri i Popullit =

Albanian daily newspaper

Zëri i Popullit The Voice of People

- Headquarters of Zëri i Popullit in the 1980s.
- Type: Daily newspaper
- Format: Broadsheet
- Owner(s): Party of Labour of Albania (1944–1992), Socialist Party of Albania (1992–2015)
- Editor-in-chief: Aldrin Dalipi
- Founded: 25 August 1942; 84 years ago
- Ceased publication: 13 November 2015 (print)
- Political alignment: Marxism–Leninism (historically); Social democracy (currently)
- Language: Albanian
- Headquarters: Tirana
- Circulation: 5,167 (2002)
- Website: zeripopullit.al

Zëri i Popullit (English: Voice of the People) is an Albanian online newspaper. It was the official press organ of the Party of Labour and, later, of the Socialist Party of Albania, but it later ceased print publication and became an independent online publication.

== History and profile ==
Zëri i Popullit was established on 25 August 1942 and originally edited by Enver Hoxha. It became the official newspaper of Albania and was the news and propaganda organ of the Party of Labour. After 1991 the paper continued to be published as the press organ of the same party that in June 1991 changed its name to Socialist Party of Albania.

The last page of Zëri i Popullit is published in English.

At the beginning of the 1990s the circulation of Zëri i Popullit was 20,000 and it was the second best-selling paper in the country. In 2002 the paper had a circulation of 5,167 copies. Its 2005 circulation was 35,000 copies, making it the most read daily in the country. It reached the peak of its circulation in 2005, with 35.000 copies.

Zëri i Popullit stopped print publications in November 2015, following a decision by the PS leader Edi Rama. It persists as an online information website.

Today Zëri i Popullit is a news website independent from all political parties.
