= 1966 Albanian parliamentary election =

- 10 July 1966

All 240 seats in the People's Assembly
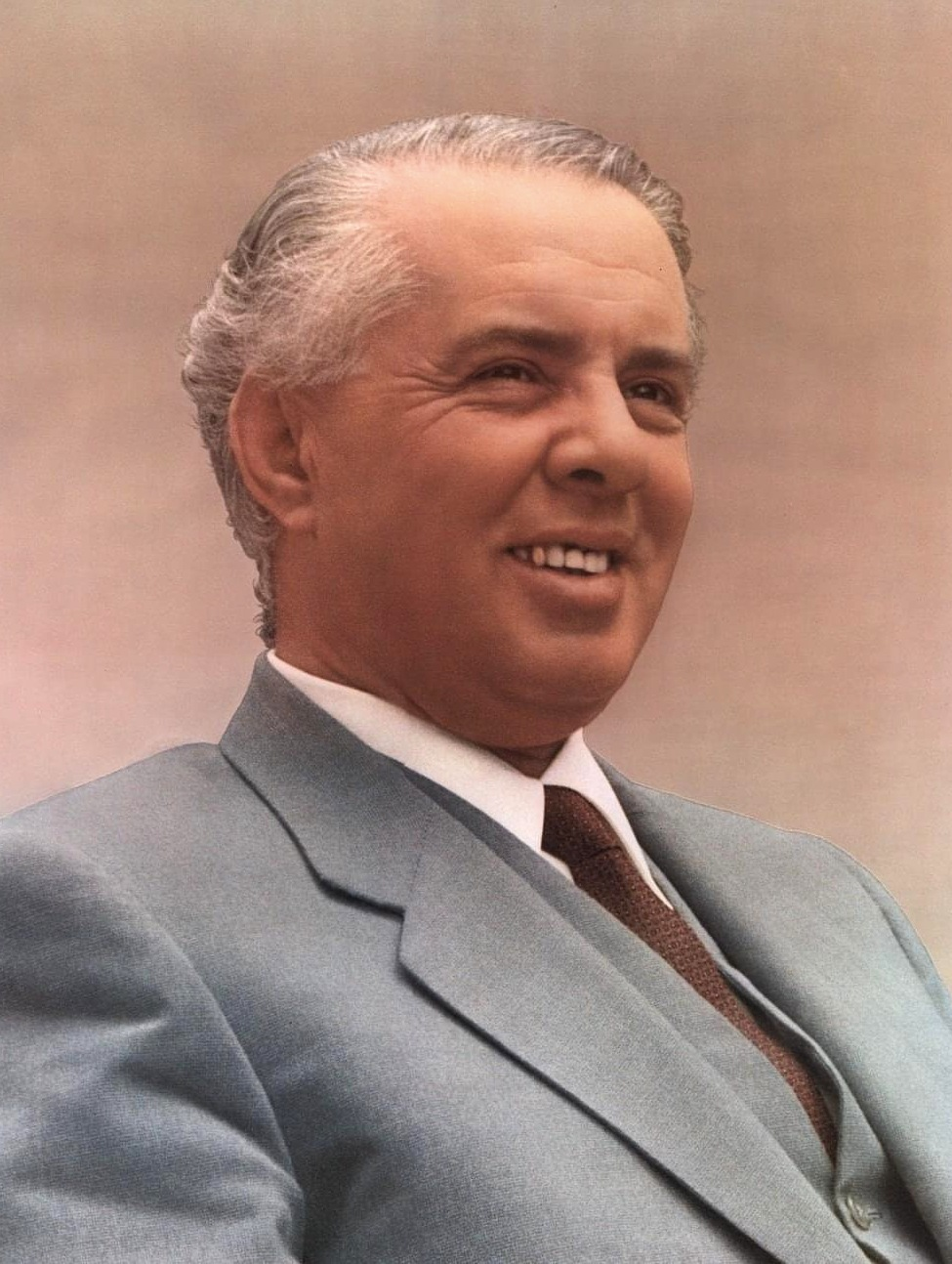
	Majority party
Leader	Enver Hoxha
Party	PPSh
Alliance	Democratic Front
Seats won	240
Seat change	▲26
Popular vote	978,114
Percentage	100.00%

Parliamentary elections were held in the People's Republic of Albania on 10 July 1966. The Democratic Front was the only party able to contest the elections, and subsequently won all 240 seats. Voter turnout was reported to be 100%, with only four registered voters not voting, a reported turnout of 99.9996 percent.

== Results ==
Party	Votes	%	Seats	+/–
Democratic Front	978,114	100.00	240	+26
Non-Front	3	0.00	–	–
Total	978,117	100.00	240	+26
Valid votes	978,117	100.00		
Invalid/blank votes	40	0.00		
Total votes	978,157	100.00		
Registered voters/turnout	978,161	100.00		
Source: Sternberger et al.
