= 1954 Albanian parliamentary election =

Albanian parliamentary election

- 28 May 1954
- All 134 seats in the People's Assembly
- Turnout: 100%
Party	Leader	Vote %	Seats	+/–
Democratic Front	Enver Hoxha	99.86	134	+13
This lists parties that won seats. See the complete results below.

Parliamentary elections were held in the People's Republic of Albania on 28 May 1954. The Democratic Front, dominated by the Communist Party of Labour of Albania, was the only organization able to contest the elections, and subsequently won all 134 seats. Voter turnout was reported to be 99.9%.

== Results ==
Party	Votes	%	Seats	+/–
Democratic Front	700,983	99.86	134	+13
Non-Front	959	0.14	–	–
Total	701,942	100.00	134	+13
Total votes	701,942	–		
Registered voters/turnout	702,476	99.92		
Source: Nohlen & Stöver
