= 1978 Albanian parliamentary election =

- 12 November 1978
- All 250 seats in the People's Assembly
- Turnout: 100%
Party	Leader	Vote %	Seats	+/–
Democratic Front	Enver Hoxha	100	250	0
This lists parties that won seats. See the complete results below.

Parliamentary elections were held in the People's Socialist Republic of Albania on 12 November 1978. The Democratic Front was the only party able to contest the elections, and subsequently won all 250 seats. Voter turnout was reported to be 100%, with all but one of the country's 1,436,289 registered voters casting votes, resulting in a turnout of 99.99993 percent.

== Results ==
Party	Votes	%	Seats	+/–
Democratic Front	1,436,285	100.00	250	0
Total	1,436,285	100.00	250	0
Valid votes	1,436,285	100.00		
Invalid/blank votes	3	0.00		
Total votes	1,436,288	100.00		
Registered voters/turnout	1,436,289	100.00		
Source: IPU
