= 1925 Albanian parliamentary election =

Parliamentary elections were held in Albania between 17 April and 17 May 1925.

== Background ==
Following the June Revolution in 1924, its leader Fan Noli became prime minister. With his government struggling to retain power, on 13 November he issued a decree for fresh elections to be held between 20 December 1924 and 20 January 1925. However, when Ahmet Zogu returned to the country in December, Noli fled and was replaced as prime minister by Iliaz Vrioni.

On 21 January Albania was declared a republic, and on 31 January Zogu was chosen as the president.

== Electoral system ==
The new republic had a bicameral parliament, consisting of an 18-member Senate and a 57-member Chamber of Deputies. The Senate was to have twelve members elected by the public and six appointed by the president.

A new electoral law was passed on 14 March. The elections remained on an indirect basis, with one elector nominated for every 500 registered voters. Those electors then elected the Deputies.

== Results ==
The election of the electors began on 17 April, with the electors voting on 17 May. As most opposition leaders had gone into exile, government candidates largely ran unopposed. As a result, voter turnout was very low.
