= 1974 Albanian parliamentary election =

Albanian parliamentary election

- 6 October 1974
- All 250 seats in the People's Assembly
- Turnout: 100%
Party	Leader	Vote %	Seats	+/–
Democratic Front	Enver Hoxha	100	250	−14
This lists parties that won seats. See the complete results below.

Parliamentary elections were held in the People's Republic of Albania on 6 October 1974. The Democratic Front was the only party able to contest the elections, and subsequently won all 250 seats. Voter turnout was reported to be 100%, with all registered voters voting.

== Results ==
Party	Votes	%	Seats	+/–
Democratic Front	1,248,528	100.00	250	–14
Total	1,248,528	100.00	250	–14
Valid votes	1,248,528	100.00		
Invalid/blank votes	2	0.00		
Total votes	1,248,530	100.00		
Registered voters/turnout	1,248,530	100.00		
Source: Nohlen & Stöver
