= 1962 Albanian parliamentary election =

Albanian parliamentary election

- 3 June 1962
- All 214 seats in the People's Assembly
- Turnout: 100%
Party	Leader	Vote %	Seats	+/–
Democratic Front	Enver Hoxha	100	214	+26
This lists parties that won seats. See the complete results below.

Parliamentary elections were held in the People's Republic of Albania on 3 June 1962. The Democratic Front was the only party able to contest the elections, and subsequently won all 214 seats. Voter turnout was reported to be 100%, with only seven registered voters not voting, equivalent to a 99.9992 percent rate of participation.

== Results ==
Party	Votes	%	Seats	+/–
Democratic Front	889,828	100.00	214	+26
Non-Front	40	0.00	–	–
Total	889,868	100.00	214	+26
Total votes	889,868	–		
Registered voters/turnout	889,875	100.00		
Source: Nohlen & Stöver
