= 1970 Albanian parliamentary election =

Albanian parliamentary election

- 20 September 1970
- All 264 seats in the People's Assembly
- Turnout: 100%
Party	Leader	Vote %	Seats	+/–
Democratic Front	Enver Hoxha	100	264	+24
This lists parties that won seats. See the complete results below.

Parliamentary elections were held in the People's Republic of Albania on 20 September 1970. The Democratic Front was the only party allowed to contest the elections, winning all 264 seats with 100% of the vote. Voter turnout was reported to be 100%, with all registered voters participating.

== Results ==
Party	Votes	%	Seats	+/–
Democratic Front	1,097,122	100.00	264	+24
Total	1,097,122	100.00	264	+24
Valid votes	1,097,122	100.00		
Invalid/blank votes	1	0.00		
Total votes	1,097,123	100.00		
Registered voters/turnout	1,097,123	100.00		
Source: Nohlen & Stöver
