= 1982 Albanian parliamentary election =

- 14 November 1982
- All 250 seats in the People's Assembly
- Turnout: 100%
Party	Leader	Vote %	Seats	+/–
Democratic Front	Enver Hoxha	100	250	0
This lists parties that won seats. See the complete results below.

Parliamentary elections were held in the People's Socialist Republic of Albania on 14 November 1982. The Democratic Front was the only party able to contest the elections, and subsequently won all 250 seats. Voter turnout was reported to be 100%.

== Results ==
Party	Votes	%	Seats	+/–
Democratic Front	1,627,959	100.00	250	0
Total	1,627,959	100.00	250	0
Valid votes	1,627,959	100.00		
Invalid/blank votes	9	0.00		
Total votes	1,627,968	100.00		
Registered voters/turnout	1,627,968	100.00		
Source: IPU
